= 2017 Mongolian presidential election =

- 26 June 2017 (first round); 7 July 2017 (second round)
- Turnout: 68.27% (first round) ▲1.77pp 60.67% (second round) ▼7.60pp
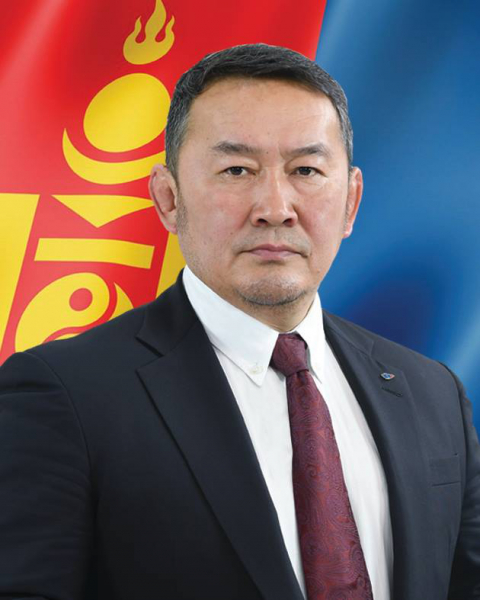

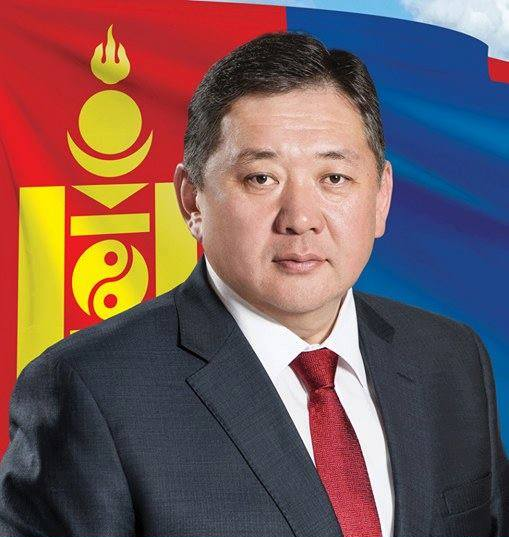
Nominee	Khaltmaagiin Battulga	Miyeegombyn Enkhbold
Party	Democratic	MPP
Popular vote	611,226	497,067
Percentage	50.61%	41.16%
President before election
Tsakhiagiin Elbegdorj
Democratic
Elected President
Khaltmaagiin Battulga
Democratic

Presidential elections were held in Mongolia on 26 June 2017. Incumbent president Tsakhiagiin Elbegdorj, first elected in 2009 and re-elected in 2013, was constitutionally barred from running for a third term.

For the first time, no candidate received a majority vote in the first round, forcing a run-off between the Democratic Party (DP) candidate Khaltmaagiin Battulga and the Mongolian People's Party (MPP) candidate Miyeegombyn Enkhbold on 7 July, brought forward from 9 July. The third-placed Mongolian People's Revolutionary Party (MPRP) candidate Sainkhuugiin Ganbaatar refused to recognise the results after he missed out on the second round, due to finishing 1,849 votes behind Enkhbold. Ganbaatar claimed fraud and that an additional 35,000 votes had been added to the total. The MPRP demanded a recount of votes in Bayan-Ölgii Province.

In the second round, Battulga was narrowly elected with 50.61% of the valid votes, or 55% of the votes cast for a candidate, while Enkhbold received 44.85% of the votes cast. Battulga was officially inaugurated as the fifth president of Mongolia on 10 July 2017.

== Background ==
=== 2016 parliamentary election ===
In the 2016 parliamentary election, the then-governing Democratic Party (DP) faced a major electoral defeat, maintaining only 9 of its previous 35 seats in the State Great Khural. The MPP, in comparison, won a supermajority of 65 seats. Alongside the two dominant parties, the MPRP and an independent candidate, respectively, won a single seat.

Despite the landslide victory, Enkhbold, as chairperson of the MPP, decided not to assume the role of prime minister and instead became speaker of parliament. Jargaltulgyn Erdenebat was nominated and appointed as the next prime minister, which became a setback for Enkhbold's personal popularity. The 2016 local elections in October saw the MPP win another landslide victory in all of the provincial, district, and capital governorships and legislatures, all except Zavkhan Province.

Prior to the 2017 presidential election, the Erdenebat cabinet's decisions to increase seven types of taxes, cut social care, and extend the retirement age all faced public outcry. A range of public opinion surveys conducted before or during the election established that these decisions led to a disillusionment with the MPP.

== Electoral system ==
The President of Mongolia is elected using the two-round system. Mongolian electoral law considers the blank votes casts in presidential elections as valid votes. The General Election Commission (GEC) thus includes blank votes in its calculations of the proportion of the vote won by each candidate; as a result, it is possible for no candidate to receive a majority of the vote in the second round. If this happens, the entire election is annulled and fresh elections would be held with new candidates.

== Nominees ==
Three political parties with seats in the State Great Khural were eligible to nominate a presidential candidate; the Mongolian People's Party (MPP), the Democratic Party (DP) and the Mongolian People's Revolutionary Party (MPRP).

=== Mongolian People's Party ===
Candidates for the MPP presidential bid were selected from a party public survey on 2 May 2017. About 50,000 people participated in the sociological survey. The top five most favoured politicians — Miyeegombyn Enkhbold, Tsendiin Nyamdorj, Ölziisaikhany Enkhtüvshin, Ukhnaagiin Khürelsükh, Badmaanyambuugiin Bat-Erdene — were proposed and discussed as potential primary candidates. During the party board meeting on 2 May, Enkhtüvshin, Khürelsükh and Bat-Erdene withdrew their names to support the party policy.

Enkhbold and Nyamdorj ran for the MPP presidential nomination on 3 May 2017, during a party conference. Out of the 259 governing board members, Enkhbold received 85% of the total vote and was chosen as the MPP pick for the 2017 presidential election. Nyamdorj was eliminated from the primary with 14.3%

_{1}

Mongolian People's Party Nominee
Miyeegombyn Enkhbold
for President
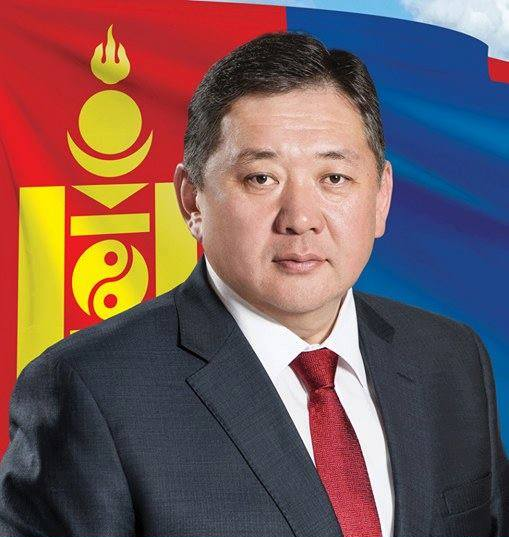
Chairman of the Mongolian People's Party

(2013–2017)

==== Withdrawn or eliminated candidates ====
Candidates in this section are sorted by date of withdrawal from the primaries
Tsendiin Nyamdorj	Ölziisaikhany Enkhtüvshin	Ukhnaagiin Khürelsükh	Badmaanyambuugiin Bat-Erdene
Minister of Justice and Internal Affairs (2008–2012)	Chairman of the Mongolian People's Party (2012–2013)	Deputy Prime Minister of Mongolia (2016–2017)	Minister of Defense (2016–2017); Bökh, sambo, judo wrestler
Eliminated: May 3 37 votes (14.3%)	Withdrew: May 2 Did not participate in primary	Withdrew: May 2 Did not participate in primary	Withdrew: May 2 Did not participate in primary

The VII Mongolian People's Party General Assembly Vote on 3 May 2017
Candidate	Results	Votes	%
Miyeegombyn Enkhbold	Nominated	222	85.71
Tsendiin Nyamdorj	Eliminated	37	14.28

=== Democratic Party ===
A total of eight people from the Democratic Party announced their bid for the presidential race as of 28 April. Presidential hopefuls included former prime minister Norovyn Altankhuyag, Rinchinnyamyn Amarjargal, former party chairman Dambiin Dorligjav, former Ulaanbaatar mayor Erdeniin Bat-Üül, historian Bat-Erdeniin Batbayar (colloquially known as Baabar), and Khaltmaagiin Battulga. Out of the eight nominees, six people registered to compete in the primaries on 2 May.

The DP chose Battulga as its nominee for the 2017 presidential election during its VIII Convention, which took place from 2nd to 4th of May. The DP candidate was picked via a poll held during the convention; Battulga, who had the highest score, was chosen.

_{2}

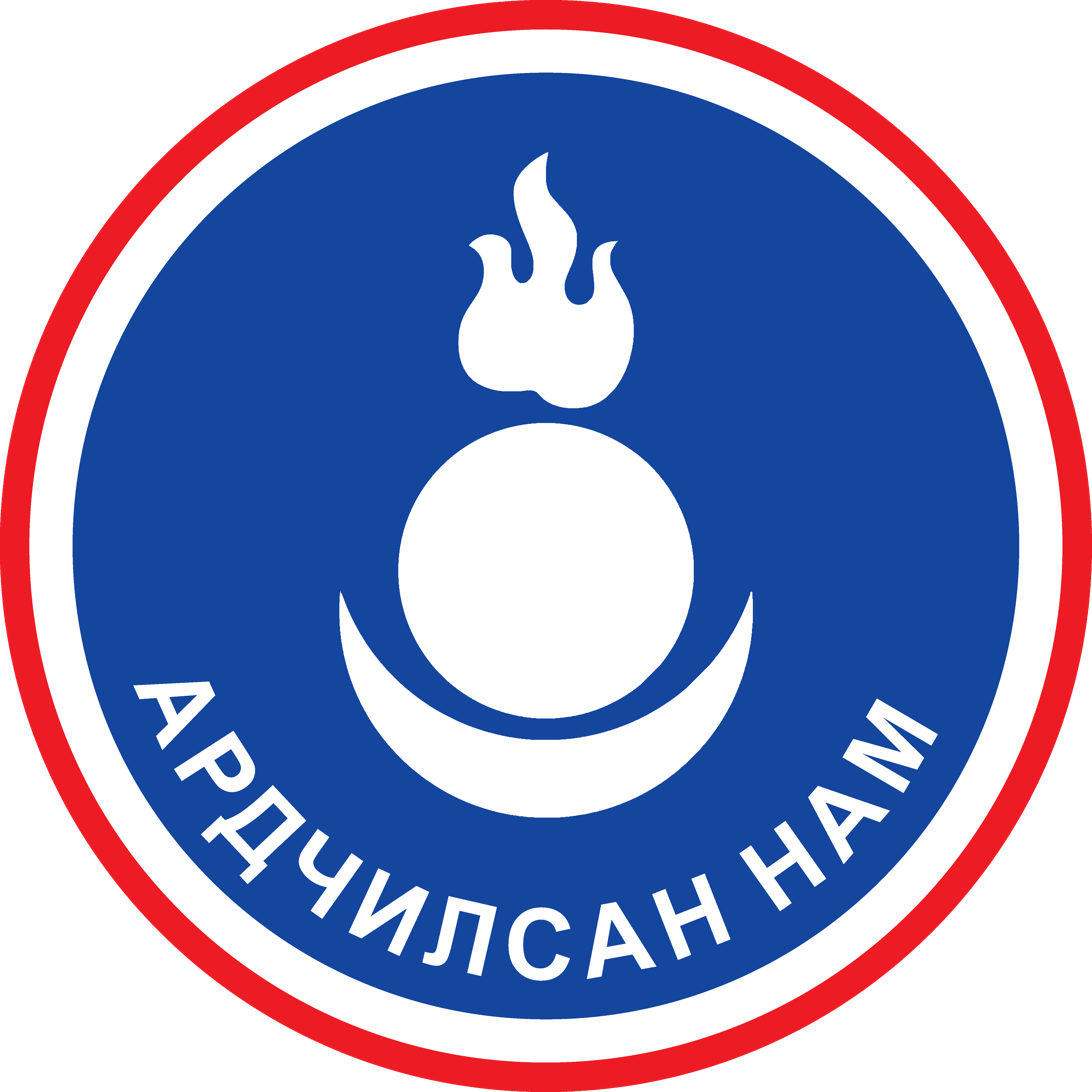

Democratic Party Nominee
Khaltmaagiin Battulga
for President
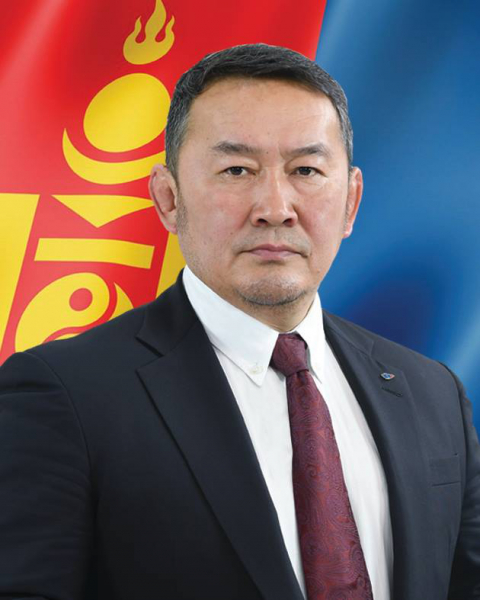
Sambo wrestling Champion
Member of the State Great Khural

(2004–2016)

==== Withdrawn or eliminated candidates ====
Candidates in this section are sorted by date of withdrawal from the primaries
Rinchinnyamyn Amarjargal	Dambiin Dorligjav	Norovyn Altankhuyag	Luvsanvandangiin Bold	Bazarsadyn Jargalsaikhan	Erdeniin Bat-Üül	Bat-Erdeniin Batbayar
Prime Minister of Mongolia (1999–2000)	Chairman of the Democratic Party (2000–2002)	Prime Minister of Mongolia (2012–2014)	Minister of Foreign Affairs (2012–2014)	Businessman and chairman of the Republican Party	Mayor of Ulaanbaatar (2012–2016)	Essayist, political analyst
Eliminated: May 4 2,374.85 score	Eliminated: May 4 1,058.64 score	Eliminated: May 4 1,044.20 score	Eliminated: May 4 917.30 score	Eliminated: May 4 213.66 score	Withdrew: May 2 Did not register for the primary	Withdrew: May 2 Did not register for the primary

Erdeniin Bat-Üül, former mayor of Ulaanbaatar and key figure of the 1990 Democratic Revolution, did not register for the 3-4 May primary. Instead, he called upon fellow DP members to boycott the 2017 presidential election to "prevent the MPP from once again stealing an election, illegally and unconstitutionally."

The VIII Democratic Party Convention Primary on 3 May 2017
Candidate	Results	Points
Khaltmaagiin Battulga	Nominated	2,740.94
Rinchinnyamyn Amarjargal	Eliminated	2,374.85
Dambiin Dorligjav	Eliminated	1,058.64
Norovyn Altankhuyag	Eliminated	1,044.20
Luvsanvandangiin Bold	Eliminated	917.30
Bazarsadyn Jargalsaikhan	Eliminated	213.66

=== Mongolian People's Revolutionary Party ===
The MPRP had originally selected former president Nambaryn Enkhbayar as its candidate at the MPRP's XVI party conference on 5 May. However, the GEC refused to allow Enkhbayar to run as a candidate as he had an outstanding criminal record and had not spent the last five years in the country, having lived abroad from August 2013 until October 2014. As a result, the party selected a non-MPRP member and former chairperson of the National Labour Party, Sainkhuugiin Ganbaatar, as its candidate on 16 May. Prior on 6 May, Ganbaatar did not rule out the possibility of running as the MPRP candidate on a TV9 broadcast. The party's sole MP, Oktyabriin Baasankhüü, opposed Ganbaatar's nomination and left the party on 17 May.

_{3}

Mongolian People's Revolutionary Party Nominee
Sainkhuugiin Ganbaatar
for President
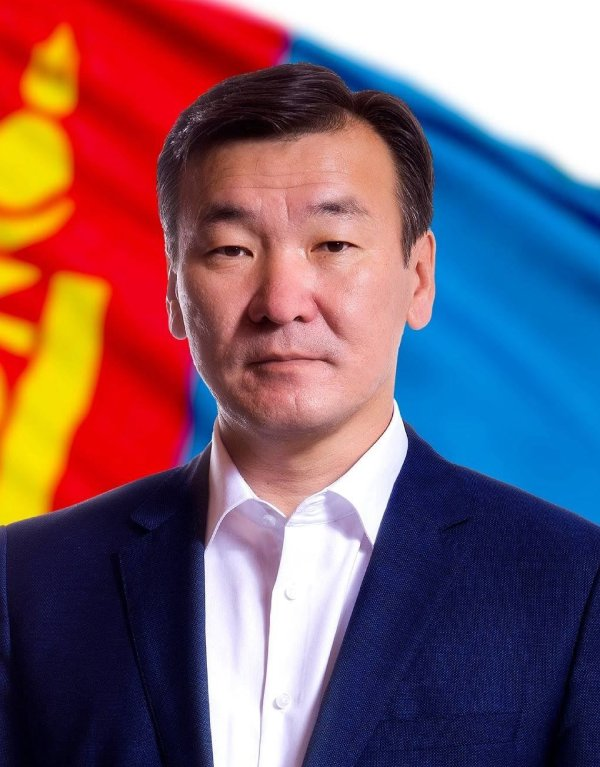
Member of the State Great Khural

(2012–2016)

==== Rejected candidates ====
Candidates in this section are sorted by date of withdrawal
Nambaryn Enkhbayar

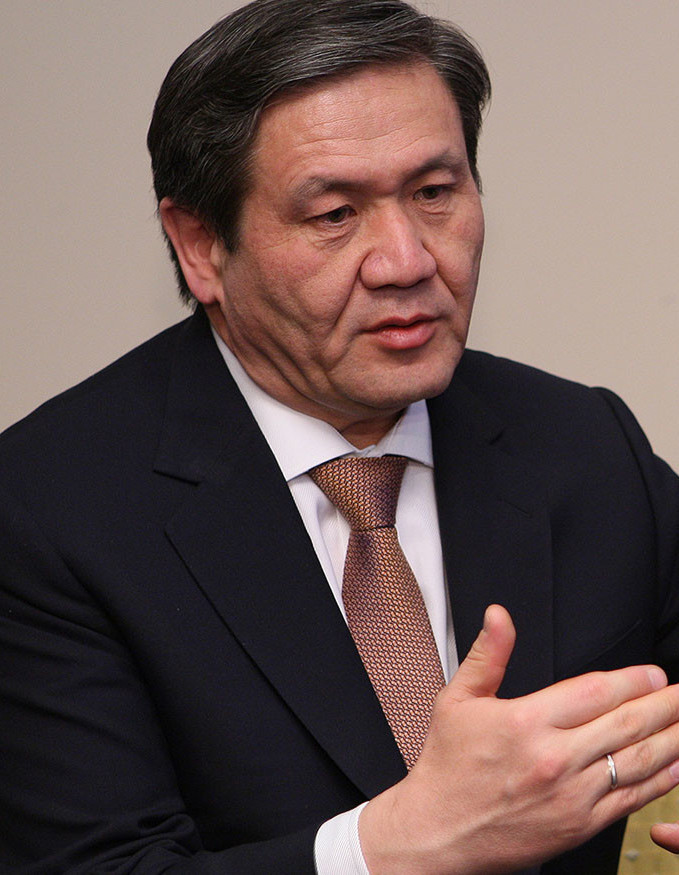

3rd President of Mongolia

(2005–2009)

Rejected by the GEC: May 14

== Registered candidates ==
On 11 May, the GEC received all the registration documents from the three nominees — Enkhbold (MPP), Battulga (DP), and Enkhbayar (MPRP). The GEC announced its decision to register Enkhbold and Battulga and reject Enkhbayar's registration on 14 May. Subsequently, after the MPRP nominated Ganbaatar on 16 May, the GEC officially registered Ganbaatar's candidacy on 18 May. The candidate's orders were ordered according to the amount of party seats in parliament.

Names	Born	Slogan	Last position	Party
Miyeegombyn Enkhbold	19 July 1964 (52); Ulaanbaatar, Mongolia	Эвтэй Монгол, Ээлтэй Төр (lit. 'Harmonious Mongolia, Well-willed Government')	Chairman of the State Great Khural (2016–2019); Chairman of the MPP (2013–2017); Prime Minister of Mongolia (2006–2007)	Mongolian People's Party
Khaltmaagiin Battulga	3 March 1963 (54); Ulaanbaatar, Mongolia	Монгол ялна (lit. 'Mongolia will win')	President of the Mongolian Judo Association (since 2006); Member of the State Great Khural (2004–2016)	Democratic Party of Mongolia
Sainkhüügiin Ganbaatar	30 July 1970 (46); Bayankhongor, Mongolia	Өөр гарц байна. Бидэнд итгэ (lit. 'There's another way out. Trust us.')	Member of the State Great Khural (2012–2016)	Mongolian People's Revolutionary Party

== Campaign ==
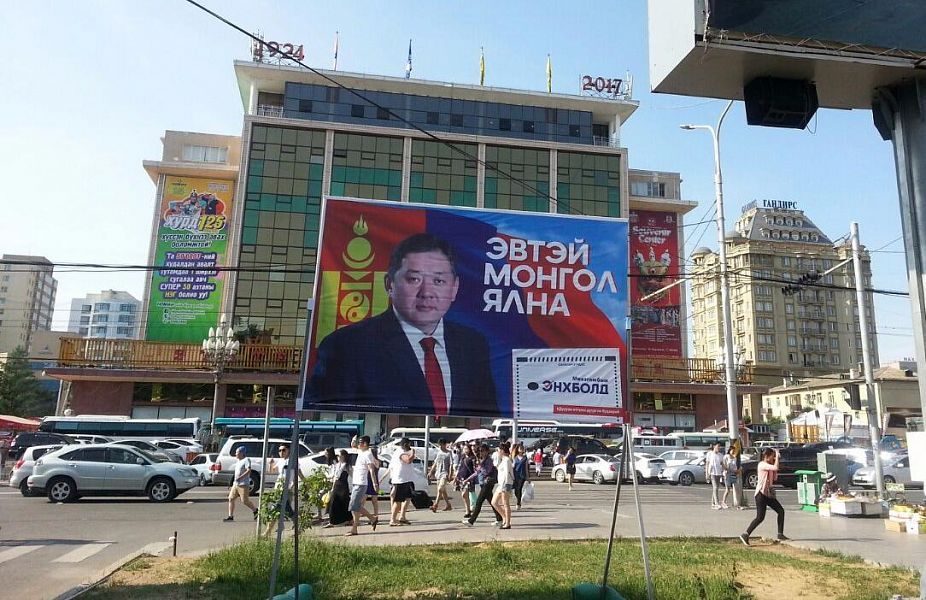
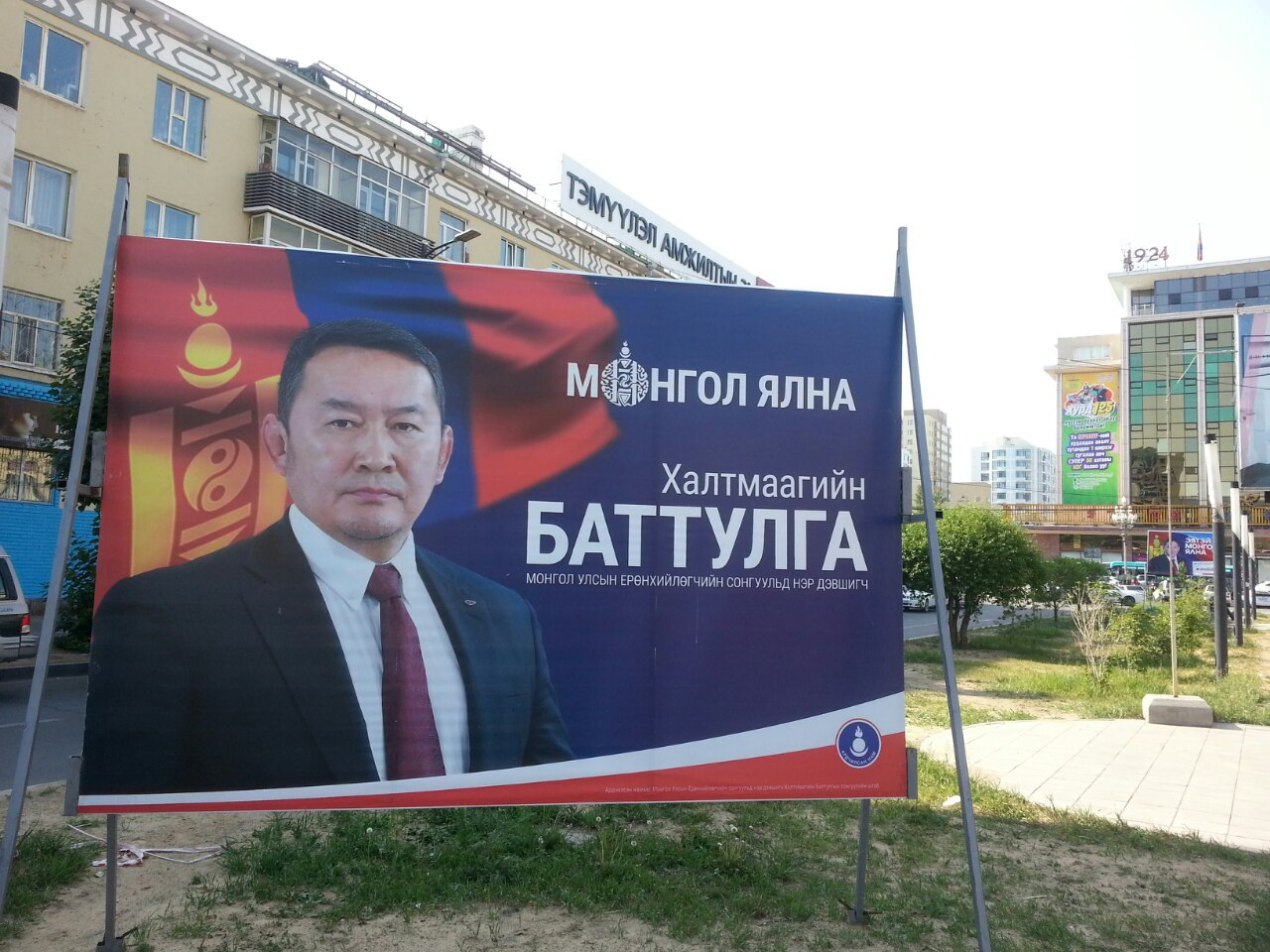
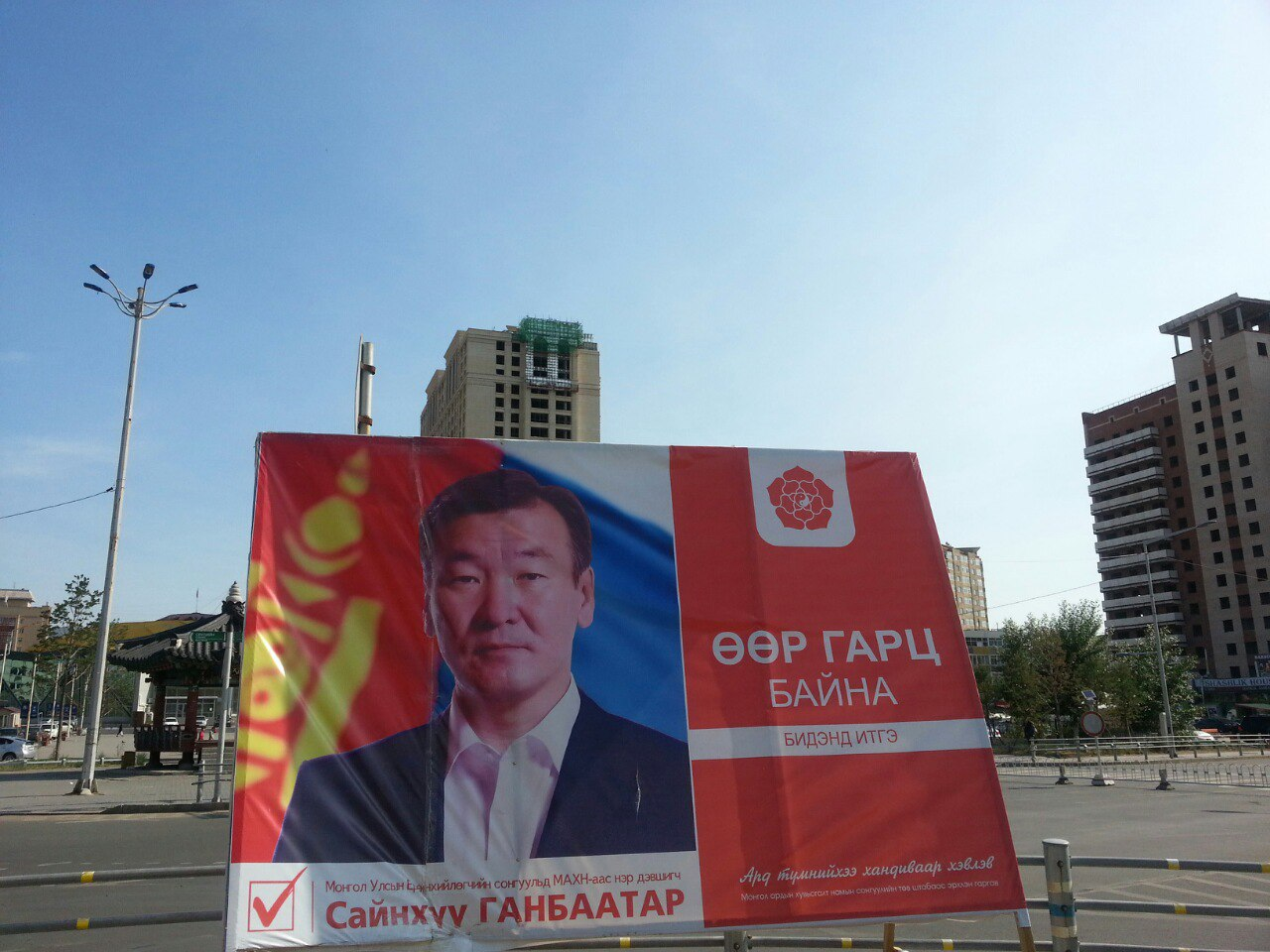
Campaign posters of Miyeegombyn Enkhbold (top left), Khaltmaagiin Battulga (top right), and Sainkhuugiin Ganbaatar (bottom) in Ulaanbaatar

Candidates for the election had 18 days, 24 hours before the election was conducted on 26 June, to campaign after being registered by the GEC. Campaigning officially started on 27 May when all three candidates received their candidate ID cards from the GEC.

Battulga, a judoka and businessman, campaigned on a "Mongolia First" policy. Political analysts drew similarities between Battulga's populist campaign and U.S. President Donald Trump's 2016 campaign.

Ganbaatar, meanwhile, campaigned on resource nationalism. Prior to and during his presidential candidacy, he strongly positioned himself against the current establishment politics and alleged MPP-DP cabal.

On 23 May, a video of Ganbaatar receiving a 50 million KRW (equivalent to 100 million MNT) donation from a South Korean citizen was uploaded anonymously and spread across social media. According to the Law on Election, a candidate is prohibited from receiving donations from a foreign country, company, or citizen. The National Police Agency confirmed the recording as real and transferred the case to the court of Bayanzurkh District the following day, on 22 June. The court, without enough time, allowed Ganbaatar to remain on the ballot and later finalized the case after the election in October 2017.

=== Debates ===
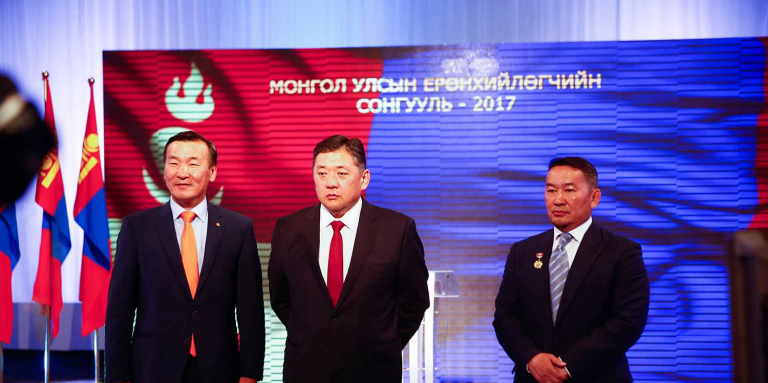
Left to right: Sainkhuugiin Ganbaatar (MPRP), Miyeegombyn Enkhbold (MPP), Khaltmaagiin Battulga (DP) during the 2017 presidential debate

The three candidates agreed to participate in a two-hour-long debate on the last day of campaigning. The presidential debate was conducted and broadcast by the Mongolian National Broadcaster (MNB) on 24 June at 21:00 PM, four days before the election. Prior to the 2017 presidential debate, the MNB received the debate questions from the public via an online portal from 22 June 9:00 AM to 23 June 24:00 AM.

Battulga and Enkhbold advanced to the second round, with Battulga overperforming both Enkhbold and Ganbaatar by around 8 per cent. On June 28, the GEC announced that the second round will be held on the 7th of July, before the traditional Naadam festival.

== Opinion polls ==
Opinion polls conducted by MEC Barometer and MMCG Research Centre prior to 28 June showed Battulga leading the other candidates by a relatively small margin.

Polling firm	Fieldwork date	Sample size	Enkhbold MPP	Battulga DP	Ganbaatar MPRP	None	Und./NA/ DK
MEC	17 May 2017	–	11.0	29.0	14.0	13.0	33.0
MMCG Research Centre	24 May 2017	–	27.7	35.6	30.5	–	–
MEC	10 June 2017	1,099	15.0	31.0	15.0	11.0	28.0
MMCG Research Centre	11 June 2017	–	29.9	31.1	31.8	–	–
MMCG Research Centre	18 June 2017	–	27.6	34.0	32.4	–	–

== Blank vote as strategic voting ==
With the election being the first time a second round was needed, it became apparent that the electoral law was imprecise on the rules of campaigning in between the two rounds. The lack of a clear rule was interpreted by the General Election Commission (GEC) as an interdiction on political campaign. Sainkhuugiin Ganbaatar, who narrowly missed the second round, began a "White Choice" (Mongolian: Цагаан сонголт) campaign calling to cast a blank vote, so as to have none of the remaining candidates reach the 50% threshold needed, leading to a new election. During a press conference on 30 June, Ganbaatar stated that if new elections are held, the MPRP leadership will nominate new candidates. While not a campaign for a candidate per se, this was nonetheless ruled by the GEC as an electoral campaign, and thus forbidden.

In the second round, 99,494 blank votes were gathered, totalling 8.24% of the total of valid votes, falling close to the intended result by a few thousand votes. The share of blank votes rose by around 7% in the second round of voting.

== Conduct ==
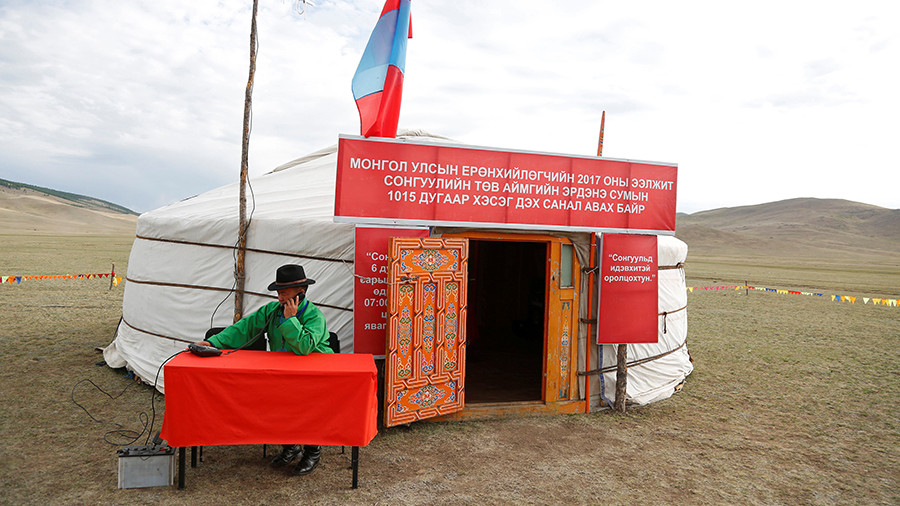
Ger poll station in the countryside

The first round of voting was held on June 26. The polling stations were open from 7.00 AM to 10.00 PM. The voting day was designated as a non-working day.

== Results ==
Candidate	Party	First round		Second round	
Candidate	Party	Votes	%	Votes	%
Khaltmaagiin Battulga	Democratic Party	517,478	38.11	611,226	50.61
Miyeegombyn Enkhbold	Mongolian People's Party	411,748	30.32	497,067	41.16
Sainkhüügiin Ganbaatar	Mongolian People's Revolutionary Party	409,899	30.19		
Blank votes		18,663	1.37	99,494	8.24
Total		1,357,788	100.00	1,207,787	100.00
Total votes		1,357,788	–	1,207,787	–
Registered voters/turnout		1,988,891	68.27	1,990,797	60.67
Source: General Election Commission

Vote share
Second round
Battulga	50.61%
Enkhbold	41.16%
Blank votes	8.24%
First round
Battulga	38.11%
Enkhbold	30.32%
Ganbaatar	30.19%
Blank votes	1.37%

=== First round ===

Results of Battulga by administrative divisions

Results of Enkhbold by administrative divisions

Results of Ganbaatar by administrative divisions

Subdivision	Khaltmaagiin Battulga DP		Miyeegombyn Enkhbold MPP		Sainkhüügiin Ganbaatar MPRP	
Subdivision	Votes	%	Votes	%	Votes	%
Aimags of Mongolia
Arkhangai	12,398	31.47%	12,059	30.61%	14,932	37.90%
Bayan-Ölgii	14,218	36.68%	19,332	49.88%	5,205	13.43%
Bayankhongor	23,886	60.44%	11,497	29.09%	4,137	10.46%
Bulgan	8,585	32.23%	7,782	29.22%	10,263	38.53%
Govi-Altai	6,565	27.06%	9,592	39.54%	8,101	33.39%
Dornogovi	9,206	32.44%	9,535	33.60%	9,635	33.95%
Govisümber	2,414	34.47%	2,031	29.00%	2,557	36.51%
Dornod	10,288	33.94%	8,092	26.70%	11,924	39.34%
Dundgovi	5,414	27.67%	5,142	26.28%	9,004	46.03%
Zavkhan	12,022	38.46%	12,505	40.01%	6,726	21.52%
Övörkhangai	14,624	31.50%	17,908	38.58%	13,883	29.91%
Ömnögovi	8,087	30.16%	7,238	26.99%	11,484	42.83%
Sükhbaatar	9,320	33.58%	10,023	36.11%	8,411	30.30%
Selenge	14,844	32.28%	15,619	33.96%	15,519	33.75%
Töv	11,253	27.67%	16,546	40.69%	12,855	31.62%
Uvs	10,355	30.67%	16,698	49.46%	6,703	19.85%
Khovd	10,060	29.58%	13,724	40.35%	10,221	30.05%
Khövsgöl	17,420	32.24%	18,802	34.80%	17,804	32.95%
Khentii	11,253	36.04%	7,804	24.99%	12,162	38.95%
Darkhan-Uul	12,427	30.05%	12,565	30.39%	16,351	39.54%
Orkhon	14,771	34.28%	9,863	22.89%	18,451	42.82%
Düüregs of Ulaanbaatar
Khan-Uul	34,595	46.50%	21,027	28.26%	18,761	25.22%
Baganuur	4,275	35.34%	4,077	33.71%	3,742	30.94%
Bagakhangai	509	25.94%	1,104	56.26%	349	17.78%
Bayanzürkh	67,336	45.21%	37,911	25.45%	43,661	29.32%
Nalaikh	5,542	34.28%	4,172	25.81%	6,450	39.90%
Sükhbaatar	29,407	46.50%	18,303	28.94%	15,524	24.55%
Chingeltei	31,065	43.39%	17,591	24.57%	22,923	32.02%
Bayangol	48,314	50.59%	25,831	27.04%	21,350	22.35%
Songino Khairkhan	63,978	38.47%	36,286	25.86%	50,022	35.65%
Overseas	2,979	63.19%	995	21.10%	740	15.69%
Total	517,478	38.10%	411,748	30.30%	409,899	30.19%

=== Second round ===
Subdivision	Khaltmaagiin Battulga DP		Miyeegombyn Enkhbold MPP	
Subdivision	Votes	%	Votes	%
Aimags of Mongolia
Arkhangai	16,763	47.43%	15,559	43.91%
Bayan-Ölgii	16,201	42.11%	21,306	55.38%
Bayankhongor	23,085	64.65%	11,944	33.45%
Bulgan	11,568	49.95%	9,360	40.42%
Govi-Altai	8,334	40.51%	10,793	52.46%
Dornogovi	11,657	44.86%	12,456	47.93%
Govisümber	2,764	42.13%	3,331	50.77%
Dornod	13,535	51.52%	10,271	39.09%
Dundgovi	6,420	36.93%	8,243	47.42%
Zavkhan	14,632	48.99%	13,993	46.85%
Övörkhangai	20,209	48.46%	19,001	45.57%
Ömnögovi	10,258	48.14%	8,412	39.48%
Sükhbaatar	11,628	48.51%	10,860	45.31%
Selenge	18,381	44.16%	20,032	48.12%
Töv	14,562	40.22%	19,192	53.01%
Uvs	12,172	39.23%	17,367	55.97%
Khovd	13,135	44.10%	14,451	48.52%
Khövsgöl	24,135	49.20%	21,550	43.93%
Khentii	14,452	53.75%	9,658	35.92%
Darkhan-Uul	16,496	45.54%	16,154	44.59%
Orkhon	20,042	53.78%	12,452	33.41%
Düüregs of Ulaanbaatar
Khan-Uul	38,047	56.19%	23,476	34.67%
Baganuur	5,193	47.71%	4,791	44.02%
Bagakhangai	682	36.73%	1,108	59.67%
Bayanzürkh	75,765	55.11%	49,030	35.66%
Nalaikh	6,979	45.52%	7,068	46.10%
Sükhbaatar	32,634	55.60%	20,717	35.30%
Chingeltei	34,807	54.02%	23,382	36.29%
Bayangol	51,596	58.63%	29,102	33.07%
Songino Khairkhan	64,272	50.87%	50,343	39.85%
Overseas	2,030	75.86%	497	18.57%
Total	611,226	50.61%	497,067	41.16%

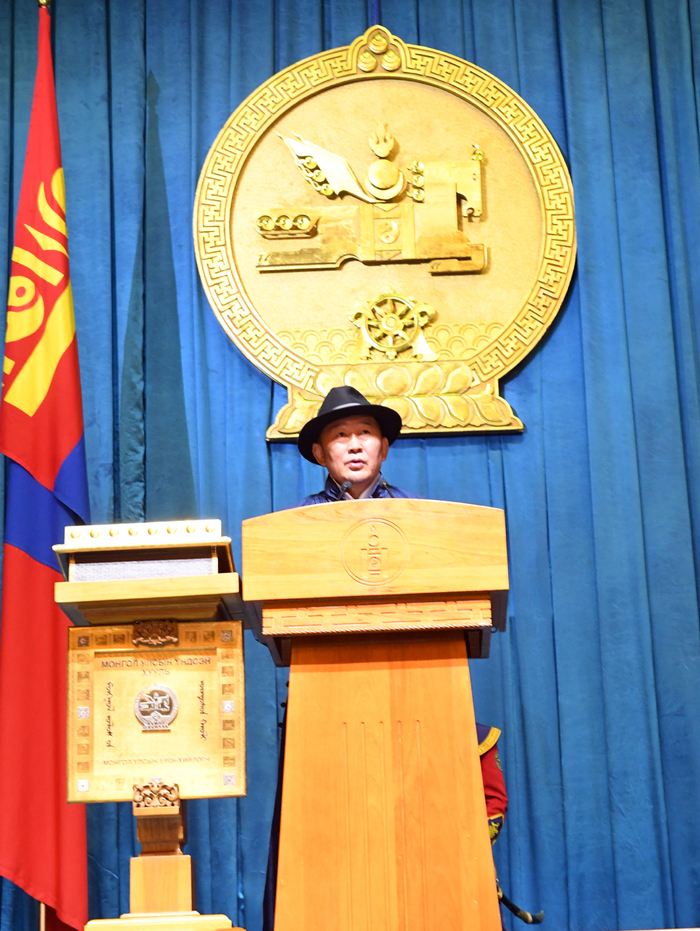
President-elect Battulga during a presidential inauguration ceremony on 10 July 2017

== Aftermath ==
On 8 July, before the official final results came out, MPP candidate Enkhbold, MPP secretary general Dashzegviin Amarbayasgalan, and MPP caucus chairman Damdiny Khayankhyarvaa conceded victory to Battulga during a press conference. Enkhbold, as chairman of the State Great Khural, noted that when the GEC presents the final results to parliament, he will convene an extraordinary session to quickly organize the presidential inauguration ceremony. He also thanked his voters, supporters, and party workers at the end of the press conference.

The inauguration ceremony of Khaltmaagiin Battulga as the fifth president of Mongolia was held at the Government Palace on 10 July 2017. During the ceremony, the extraordinary session of the State Great Khural, chaired by Enkhbold, also took place. Battulga took the presidential oath of office in front of the State Great Khural and received the State seal of Mongolia from the outgoing fourth president, Tsakhiagiin Elbegdorj.
