= Khishgeegiin Nyambaatar =

Mongolian politician (born 1978)

- Хишгээгийн Нямбаатар
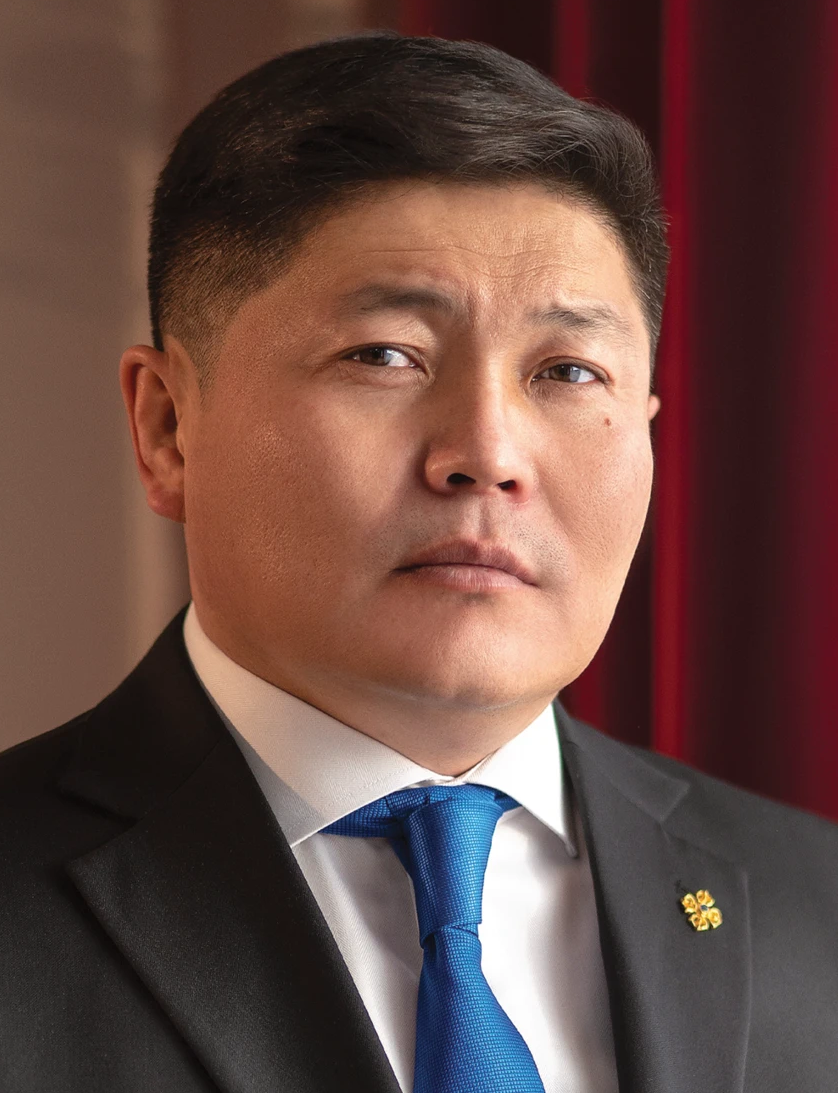

36th Mayor of Ulaanbaatar
- In office 12 October 2023 – 16 May 2026
- Preceded by: Dolgorsürengiin Sumyaabazar
- Succeeded by: Byaruuzanyn Pürevdagva

Minister of Justice and Internal Affairs
- In office 8 July 2020 – 12 October 2023
- Prime Minister: Ukhnaagiin Khürelsükh; Luvsannamsrain Oyun-Erdene
- Preceded by: Tsendiin Nyamdorj
- Succeeded by: Battumuriin Enkhbayar

Member of the State Great Khural
- In office 5 July 2016 – 12 October 2023
- Constituency: 27th, Songinokhairkhan (2020–2023); 76th, Songinokhairkhan (2016–2020)

Personal details
- Born: 4 June 1978 (age 48) Ulaanbaatar, Mongolia
- Party: Mongolian People's Party
- Education: Orkhon University; National Academy of Governance; University of Internal Affairs of Mongolia

Khishgeegiin Nyambaatar (Mongolian: Хишгээгийн Нямбаатар, born 4 June 1978) is a Mongolian politician who served as the 36th Mayor of Ulaanbaatar from October 2023 to May 2026, previously having been Minister of Justice and Internal Affairs from 2020 to 2023. He was elected as a member of the State Great Khural in 2016 and 2020. Following his appointment as mayor, he was relieved from his ministerial and parliamentary duties on 12 October 2023.

In December 2023, as the Mayor of Ulaanbaatar, Nyambaatar was tasked with overseeing the construction and completion of the city's metro system, originally planned for completion by 2020.

== Early life and education ==
Nyambaatar was born in Ulaanbaatar, the capital of the Mongolian People's Republic, on 4 June 1978. He graduated from the 48th Secondary School in 1996.

He graduated from Orkhon University with a Bachelor's degree in legal studies in 2000 and a Master's degree in pedagogy in 2002.

== Political career ==
In 2009, he was the legal advisor in Songinokhairkhan District, one of the 9 municipal districts of Ulaanbaatar. From 2012 to 2016, he served as the chairman of the Citizens' Representatives Leaders' Khural in Songinokhairkhan.

=== Member of parliament ===
In the 2016 parliamentary election, he was elected as a member of the State Great Khural from the 76th constituency in Songinokhairkhan. The Mongolian People's Party (MPP) won 65 seats out of 76 in the State Great Khural.

In late December 2018, a corruption scandal and escalating MPP factionalism kick-started the 2018 anti-corruption protests, led by Nyambaatar and other 4 lawmakers. The protests demanded the resignation of MPP parliamentary speaker Miyeegombyn Enkhbold, who previously served as party chairman conspired to raise 60 billion MNT (approximately US$23 million) by selling off state positions for the 2016 election. Nyambaatar, along with MP Luvsannamsrain Oyun-Erdene (MPP), Tumurbaataryn Ayuursaikhan (MPP), Luvsanvandangiin Bold (DP), and Jalbasurengiin Batzandan (DP), organized mass protests against Enkhbold on 27 December 2018 and 10 January 2019. The cross-party group of politicians became informally known as the "Fair Five" (Mongolian: Шударга Тав). After a month-long political gridlock, Enkhbold was officially dismissed by parliament on 29 January 2019; with it his political career and his party prominence diminished. The downfall of Enkhbold restored party unity under chairman and PM Ukhnaagiin Khürelsükh, and in a wider sense, enabled the Fair Five to ascend to higher government positions.

Nyambaatar was re-elected to parliament from the same municipal district in the 2020 parliamentary election. The MPP yet again won a supermajority, where the party controlled 62 out of 76 seats in the State Great Khural. After the 2020 elections, he was appointed to prime minister Khürelsükh's second cabinet as the Minister of Justice and Internal Affairs on 8 July 2020. He served in this position until the January 2021 COVID-19 protests, which called for accountability and resignation of the government. Khürelsükh resigned after 2 days of protests, a move widely seen by as a motive to seek the presidency. He was succeeded by Nyambaatar's long-time political ally, Oyun-Erdene.

=== Mayor of Ulaanbaatar ===
On 12 October 2023, Nyambaatar was appointed by prime minister Oyun-Erdene to become the 36th Mayor of Ulaanbaatar after the previous mayor, Dolgorsürengiin Sumyaabazar, resigned from his position due to a scandal involving the reform of the Ulaanbaatar public transport fleet that was exposed as embezzling public funds. Prior to the 2024 parliamentary election in May 2024, Nyambaatar was elected to succeed former mayor Sumyaabazar as the next chairman of the MPP in Ulaanbaatar during the Capital's Party Congress. He was reappointed as Mayor of Ulaanbaatar after the MPP declared a decisive victory in the 2024 local elections, winning 40 of 45 seats in the Citizens' Representatives Khural of the Capital City.

However, Nyambaatar's tenure came to an end on 16 May 2026, when prime minister Nyam-Osoryn Uchral officially dismissed him from his post as the Mayor of Ulaanbaatar. The dismissal followed intense pressure, including a petition signed by over 37,000 citizens, and sudden government scrutiny regarding budget transparency and the failure to regulate escalating meat prices and reserves in the capital. He was succeeded by Byaruuzanyn Pürevdagva, president of the MPP's youth wing and ex-son-in-law of now president Khürelsükh, on 16 May 2026.

Political offices
Preceded by Dolgorsürengiin Sumyaabazar	Mayor of Ulaanbaatar; 2023–2026	Succeeded by Byaruuzanyn Pürevdagva
Preceded by Tsendiin Nyamdorj	Minister of Justice and Internal Affairs; 2020–2023	Succeeded by Battumuriin Enkhbayar
