= Citizens' Representatives Khurals of Mongolia =

The Citizens' Representatives Khurals (Note: Mongolian: Иргэдийн Төлөөлөгчдийн Хурал, ИТХ, romanized: Irgediin Toloologchdiin Khural, ITKh, lit. 'Citizens' Representatives Council' Mongolian script: ᠢᠷᢉᠡᠳ ᠦ᠋ᠨ ᠲᠥᠯᠦᢉᠡᠯᠡᢉᠴᠢᠳ ᠦ᠋ᠨ ᠬᠤᠷᠠᠯ) of Mongolia are the regional and local governments in the administrative divisions of Mongolia (aimags, sums, düüregs, and the capital city).

The structure of Mongolia includes 21 provincial khurals and 1 municipal khural. Out of the first-level division khurals, the largest council is the Citizens' Representatives Khural of the Capital City, which consists of 45 deputies, while the smallest one is the Citizens' Representatives Khural of Dundgovi Province and Govisümber Province, which each consists of 25 deputies. Currently, members of the regional khurals are elected for four-year terms.

Title	Number
First-level
Provincial	21
Capital	1
Second-level
District	330
Municipal district	9

== Parties in each khural ==
Data is current as of March 2026. Data is up-to-date if the last election year has been underlined.

Division	Seats	Voting System	MPP	DP	HUN	CWGP	NC	Other parties	Independent	Last Election	Next election	Website
Aimags												
Arkhangai	41	BV	28	12	1	0	0	0	0	2024	2028	Website
Bayan-Ölgii	41	BV	18	23	0	0	0	0	0	2024	2028	Website
Bayankhongor	35	BV	23	12	0	0	0	0	0	2024	2028	Website
Bulgan	29	BV	15	14	0	0	0	0	0	2024	2028	Website
Govi-Altai	29	BV	11	18	0	0	0	0	0	2024	2028	Website
Govisümber	25	BV	21	4	0	0	0	0	0	2024	2028	Website
Darkhan-Uul	41	BV	24	16	0	0	0	0	1	2024	2028	Website
Dornogovi	35	BV	27	8	0	0	0	0	0	2024	2028	Website
Dornod	35	BV	20	14	1	0	0	0	0	2024	2028	Website
Dundgovi	25	BV	16	9	0	0	0	0	0	2024	2028	Website
Zavkhan	35	BV	19	15	0	0	0	0	1	2024	2028	Website
Orkhon	41	BV	21	20	0	0	0	0	0	2024	2028	Website
Övörkhangai	41	BV	29	12	0	0	0	0	0	2024	2028	Website
Ömnögovi	35	BV	13	21	0	0	0	0	1	2024	2028	Website
Sükhbaatar	29	BV	9	20	0	0	0	0	0	2024	2028	Website
Selenge	41	BV	21	19	1	0	0	0	0	2024	2028	Website
Töv	41	BV	20	21	0	0	0	0	0	2024	2028	Website
Uvs	35	BV	18	15	0	0	0	0	2	2024	2028	Website
Khovd	41	BV	14	27	0	0	0	0	0	2024	2028	Website
Khövsgöl	41	BV	26	15	0	0	0	0	0	2024	2028	Website
Khentii	35	BV	17	18	0	0	0	0	0	2024	2028	Website
Capital city
Ulaanbaatar	45	BV	40	5	0	0	0	0	0	2024	2028	Website
Total	796		450	338	3	0	0	0	5			

== See also ==
- Politics of Mongolia
- Administrative divisions of Mongolia
