= Amarsaikhan Sainbuyan =

Mongolian politician (born 1973)

Sainbuyangiin Amarsaikhan
- Сайнбуянгийн Амарсайхан
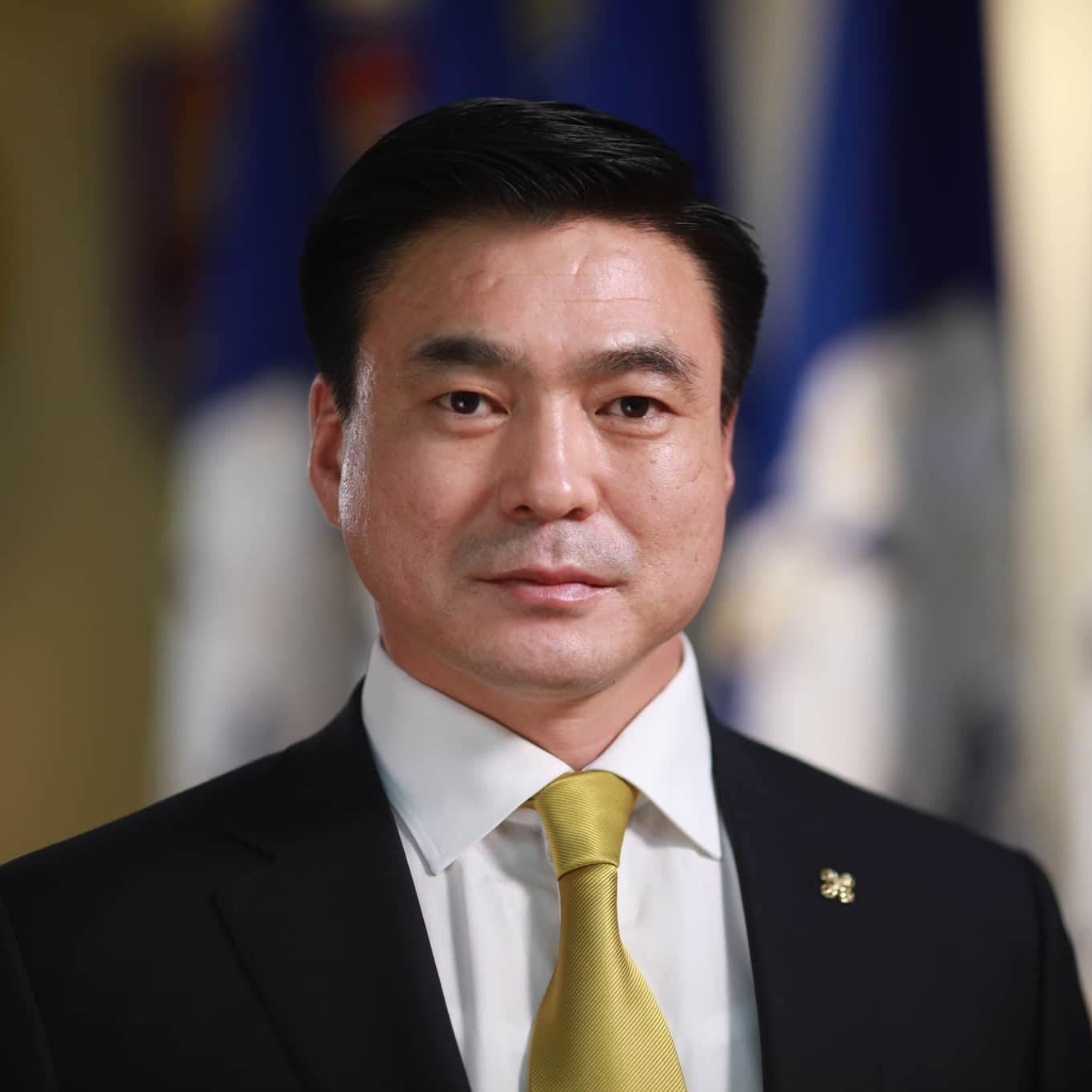
- Amarsaikhan in 2020

Deputy Prime Minister of Mongolia
- In office 29 January 2021 – 12 November 2025
- Prime Minister: Luvsannamsrain Oyun-Erdene; Gombojavyn Zandanshatar
- Preceded by: Yangugiin Sodbaatar
- Succeeded by: Khassuuriin Gankhuyag

34th Mayor of Ulaanbaatar
- In office 26 February 2019 – 1 July 2020
- Preceded by: Sunduin Batbold
- Succeeded by: Dolgorsürengiin Sumyaabazar

Member of the Great State Khural
- Incumbent
- Assumed office 2 July 2024
- Constituency: 13th, Bagakhangai, Baganuur, Nalaikh district
- In office 30 June 2020 – 2 July 2024
- Constituency: 21st, Bagakhangai, Baganuur, Nalaikh district
Municipal offices
Member of the Ulaanbaatar City Council
In office 2012 – 1 July 2020
Constituency	Nalaikh District (2012–2020)
Chairman of the Ulaanbaatar City Council
In office 2017–2019
Preceded by	Tsendiin Sandui
Succeeded by	Rentsendagvyn Dagva

Personal details
- Born: 13 June 1973 (age 53) Nalaikh, Ulaanbaatar, Mongolia
- Party: Mongolian People's Party
- Spouse: Ichinkhorloo Chimeddamba
- Children: 3
- Education: Fresno City College; Southwestern University (LLM)
- Website: amarsaikhan.mn

Sainbuyangiin Amarsaikhan (Mongolian: Сайнбуянгийн Амарсайхан; born 13 June 1973) is a Mongolian businessman and politician who served as the Deputy Prime Minister of Mongolia from 2021 to 2025 and Mayor and Governor of Ulaanbaatar from 2019 to 2020. A member of the Mongolian People's Party, he was elected to the Ulaanbaatar City Council in 2012 and 2016; and to the State Great Khural in 2020 and 2024.

Amarsaikhan has served as the Deputy Prime Minister since 2021, with reappointment following a cabinet reshuffle in 2022, and again in 2024 after parliamentary elections. During his tenure, he oversaw multiple critical areas of national importance, including his roles as Head of the National Emergency Management Agency, Chairman of the National Committee for Regional Development, and Chairman of the National Committee for Climate Change.

== Early life and education ==
Amarsaikhan was born in Nalaikh district of Ulaanbaatar, the capital of the Mongolian People's Republic, on 13 June 1973. He was the second youngest of nine children and spent most of his childhood in Nalaikh.

From 1981 to 1991, he completed his secondary education at "Erdmiin Orgil" secondary school in his home district. He studied at Fresno City College from 1994 to 1996 and at a college in Utah from 1996 to 1998. He graduated with a Master of Laws after two years at Southwestern University in 2000.

From 2000 until 2004, he served as attaché at the Mongolian embassy to the People's Republic of China.

== Political career ==
=== Ulaanbaatar City Council ===
As a member of the Mongolian People's Party (MPP), Amarsaikhan was elected as a member of the Citizens' Representatives Khural of the Capital City, also known as the Ulaanbaatar City Council, from Nalaikh in the 2012 local elections. He was re-elected to the city council from his constituency in 2016. During his second term, he was nominated (21-20) as the chairman of the Ulaanbaatar city council on 9 October 2017. Subsequently, he was elected (25-19) Mayor of Ulaanbaatar by the legislature on 27 February 2019.

=== Member of Parliament ===
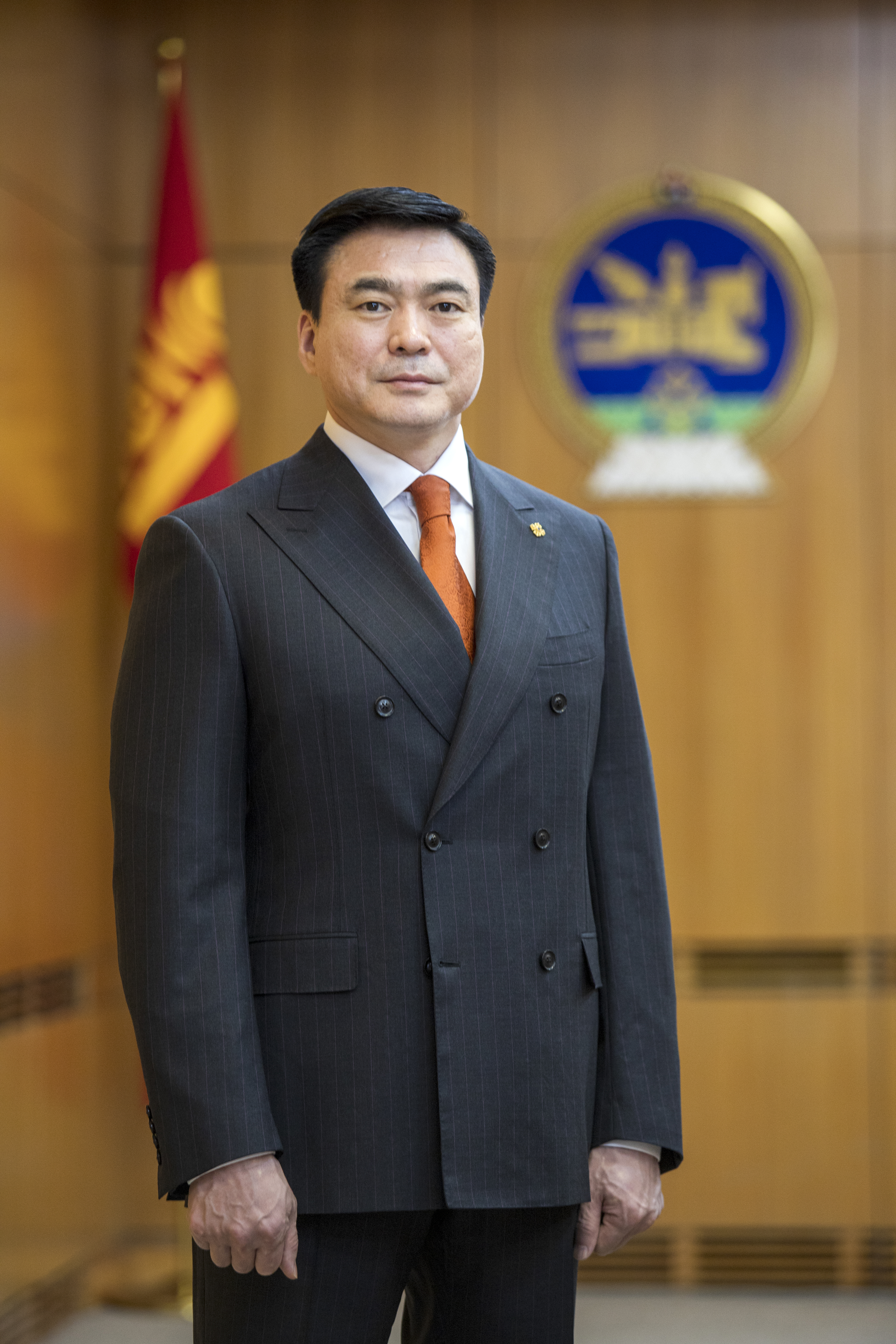
Official portrait, 2025

In the 2020 parliamentary election, Amarsaikhan was elected a member of the State Great Khural from the 21st constituency in Bagakhangai, Baganuur, and Nalaikh. Following his election, he resigned as mayor of Ulaanbaatar and handed over his duties to his deputy, Jantsangiin Batbayasgalan, on 1 July 2020. Batbayasgalan served as acting mayor until 23 October 2020, when Dolgorsürengiin Sumyaabazar was appointed as the next mayor. In January 2021, Prime Minister Ukhnaagiin Khürelsükh and his cabinet resigned following mass protests over his handling of the pandemic. His successor, Luvsannamsrain Oyun-Erdene, formed a new cabinet on 29 January 2021. Amarsaikhan was appointed Deputy Prime Minister of Mongolia and Head of the National Emergency Management Agency. He remained as deputy amidst a cabinet reshuffle in August 2022.

Amarsaikhan was re-elected as MP in the 2024 parliamentary election and was reappointed as deputy prime minister of the second Oyun-Erdene cabinet, alongside Luvsannyamyn Gantömör and Togmidyn Dorjkhand. However, Prime Minister Oyun-Erdene himself was forced to resign after mass protests in mid-2025. Gombojavyn Zandanshatar replaced Oyun-Erdene in June 2025 and formed a government with Nyam-Osoryn Uchral, Dorjkhand, and Amarsaikhan as his deputies. In the aftermath of a month-long leadership feud within the MPP, Amarsaikhan was dismissed by Zandanshatar in late October and succeeded by Khassuuriin Gankhuyag on 12 November 2025.

=== International cooperation ===
In the realm of international cooperation, Amarsaikhan has co-chaired several high-profile international bodies. These include the Mongolia-European Union Cooperation Committee, the Mongolia-U.S. Chamber of Commerce and Investment, and the Mongolia-India Intergovernmental Commission. Additionally, he currently co-chairs Mongolia's roundtable meetings with the United Kingdom and Canada, as well as the Intergovernmental Commissions of Mongolia with Russia, Uzbekistan, and Kyrgyzstan.

== List of positions ==
- Deputy Prime Minister of Mongolia (2021–2025)
- Head of the National Emergency Management Agency (2021–2025)
- Deputy chairman of the Mongolian People's Party parliamentary caucus (2020–2021)
- Member of the State Great Khural (2020–present)
- Mayor of Ulaanbaatar (2019–2020)
- Chairman of the Ulaanbaatar City Council (2017–2019)
- Member of the Ulaanbaatar City Council (2012–2020)

== Personal life ==
Amarsaikhan is married to Chimeddambyn Ichinkhorloo, a broadcaster, and has three children.

== Awards ==
- Order of the Polar Star (2014)

Political offices
Preceded by Yangugiin Sodbaatar	Deputy Prime Minister of Mongolia; 2021–2025	Succeeded by Khassuuriin Gankhuyag
