= Tuyaa =

Tuyaa is a Mongolian female given name. Notable people with the name include:

- Yadamsürengiin Tuyaa (born 1947), Mongolian Olympic gymnast
- Nyam-Osoryn Tuyaa (born 1958), Mongolian politician
