= Byaruuzanyn Pürevdagva =

37th Mayor of Ulaanbaatar

- Бяруузанын Пүрэвдагва ᠪᠢᠷᠠᠭᠤᠵᠠᠨ᠎ᠤ ᠫᠦᠷᠪᠥᠳᠠᠭᠪᠠ

37th Mayor of Ulaanbaatar
- Incumbent
- Assumed office 26 May 2026
- Preceded by: Khishgeegiin Nyambaatar

Personal details
- Born: 12 April 1990 (age 36) Khentii Province, Mongolia
- Party: Mongolian People's Party
- Children: 3
- Education: National University of Mongolia

Byaruuzanyn Pürevdagva (Mongolian: Бяруузанын Пүрэвдагва, born 12 April 1990) is a Mongolian politician currently serving as the 37th Mayor of Ulaanbaatar since May 2026.

== Early life and education ==
Pürevdagva was born on 12 April 1990 in Khentii Province, Mongolia. He attended secondary school at Capital City School No. 45, graduating in 2008. He pursued his higher education at the National University of Mongolia, earning a bachelor's degree in Political science in 2012. He later studied abroad at the University of Newcastle in Australia, where he completed his master's degree in Sustainable Development in 2017. In 2019, he completed specialized training in the United Nations Sustainable Development Programme.

== Political career ==
Pürevdagva joined the Mongolian People's Party (MPP) in 2008. From 2010 to 2011, he worked as a MPP regional coordinator, and from 2011 to 2012, he worked as an assistant to the party's General Secretary. Between 2012 and 2013, he was a staff clerk for the parliament's secretariat. After studying abroad in Australia, he advised the MPP General Secretary from 2017 to 2018, and headed the Local and Party Development Department from 2018 to 2020. In 2020, he was elected to the Ulaanbaatar City Council (НИТХ) and served as General Secretary of the Social Democratic Youth Association until 2021. He became Head of the MPP's Party Organization Department in 2021 and has presided over the youth association since 2024.

=== Mayor of Ulaanbaatar ===
On 25 May 2026, the local MPP committee voted unanimously to nominate Pürevdagva for mayor. The next day, his nomination was approved by the Ulaanbaatar City Council, with 80% of the representatives voting in his favor. He was officially appointed by Prime Minister Nyam-Osoryn Uchral later that day, making him the 37th Governor of the Capital City and Mayor of Ulaanbaatar.

== Personal life ==
Pürevdagva has two children with his current partner. He also has a child from a previous relationship with the eldest daughter of former President Ukhnaagiin Khürelsükh, which happened around 2013.
