= Khassuuriin Gankhuyag =

Mongolian politician (born 1977)

- Хассуурийн Ганхуяг
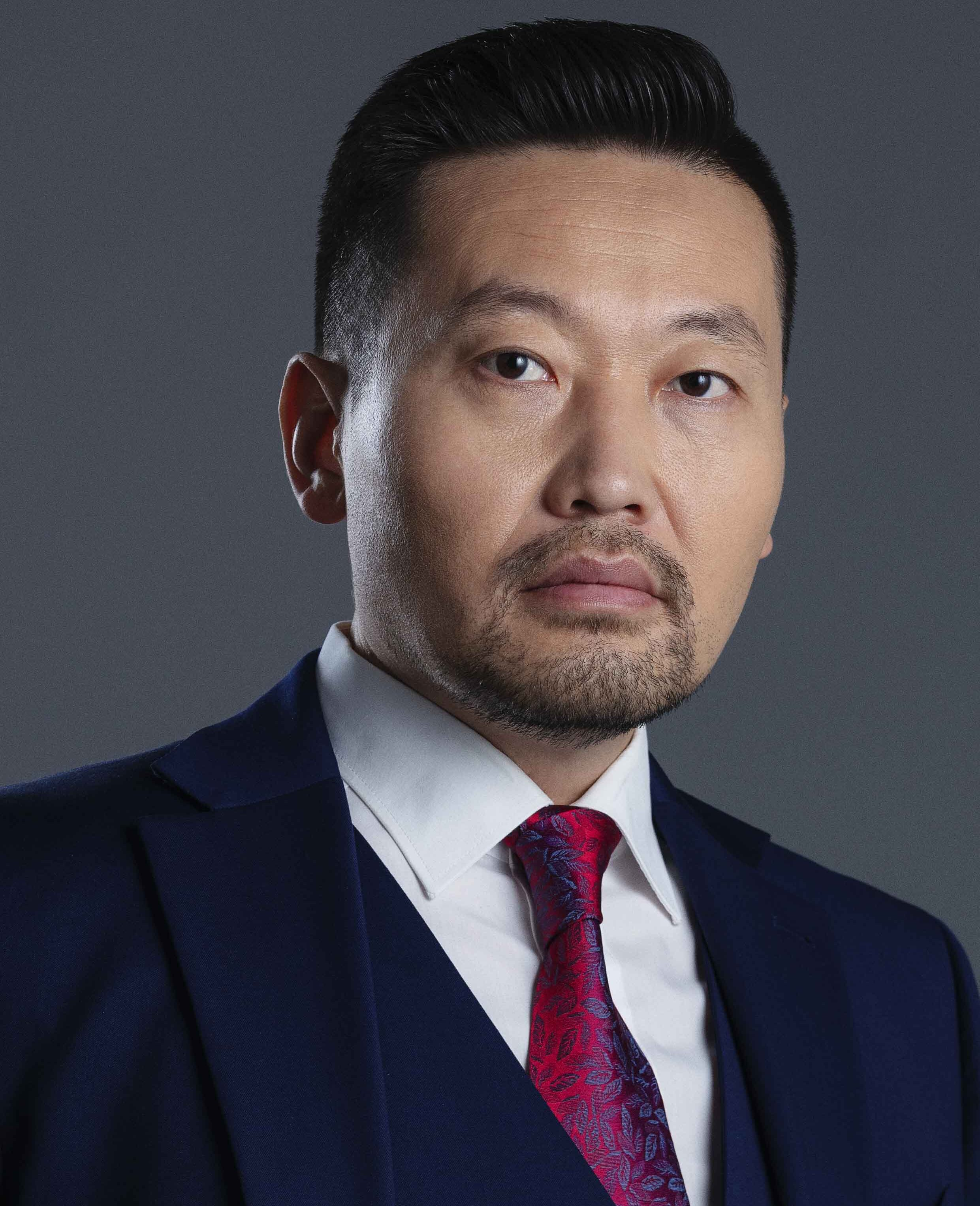
- Gankhuyag in 2020

Deputy Prime Minister of Mongolia
- In office 12 November 2025 – 4 April 2026 Serving with Togmidyn Dorjkhand
- Prime Minister: Gombojavyn Zandanshatar
- Preceded by: Amarsaikhan Sainbuyan
- Succeeded by: Nyamtaishiryn Nomtoibayar

Member of the State Great Khural
- Incumbent
- Assumed office 30 June 2020
- Constituency: 9th, Bayangol district (2024–2028); 26th, Bayangol district (2020–2024)

Personal details
- Born: 19 June 1977 (age 49) Ulaanbaatar, Mongolia
- Party: Mongolian People's Party (since 2017)
- Education: National University of Mongolia; Harvard University; University of British Columbia

Khassuuriin Gankhuyag (Mongolian: Хассуурийн Ганхуяг; born 19 June 1977) is a Mongolian businessman and politician who served as Deputy Prime Minister of Mongolia from 2025 to 2026. He has been a member of the State Great Khural since 2020.

== Career ==
Despite being a member of the National Labour Party, Gankhuyag ran as an independent in Bayangol district during the 2016 parliamentary election. With around 5000 votes, he lost in the 70th constituency, where speaker Zandaakhüügiin Enkhbold and senior member of parliament Danzangiin Lündeejantsan also ran. On 10 May 2017, Gankhuyag joined the Mongolian People's Party (MPP), which won a supermajority in 2016.
