= Ministry of Emergency Situations =

Ministry of Emergency Situations is a ministry tasked with firefighting, civil defence and occupational safety in several countries:

- Ministry of Emergency Situations (Armenia)
- Ministry of Emergency Situations (Azerbaijan)
- Ministry of Emergency Situations (Belarus)
- Ministry of Emergency Management of the People's Republic of China
- Ministry of Emergency Situations (Kazakhstan)
- Ministry of Emergency Situations (Kyrgyzstan)
- Ministry of Emergency Situations (Russia)
- Committee of Emergency Situations and Civil Defense of Tajikistan
- State Emergency Service of Ukraine
- Ministry of Emergency Situations (Uzbekistan)

== See also ==
- Federal Emergency Management Agency in the United States
- National Emergency Management Agency (disambiguation)
