= Orkhon University =

University in Khan-Uul, Ulaanbaatar, Mongolia

- Former names: Orkhon Institute of Foreign Languages and Secretarial Training
- Type: private
- Established: 1992; 34 years ago
- Founder: Khajidsuren Nyamaa
- Affiliations: Consortium of Universities and Colleges of Mongolia
- Chairman: Mijid Yagaan
- President: Dr. Dawn Dekle
- Faculty: 60
- Administrative staff: 30
- Students: 1100
- Location: Khan Uul, Ulaanbaatar, Mongolia; 47°53′39.9″N 106°54′5.4″E
- Campus: Urban
- Colors: Blue and white
- Nickname: OU
- Mascot: Sharks
- Website: http://www.orkhon.edu.mn

Orkhon University is nonprofit private university in Khan Uul, Ulaanbaatar, Mongolia. Founder Khajidsuren Nyamaa established the university in 1992 as Orkhon Institute of Foreign Languages and Secretarial Training. A branch of the school was founded in Zavkhan Province in 1998. The postgraduate program was opened in 2002. The language of instruction is Mongolian, but there is a strategic plan to shift to bilingual education, Mongolian and English, in the near future.

== Campus ==
Orkhon University is in the Khan Uul district of Ulaanbaatar and includes an academic building, cafeteria, multipurpose auditorium, classroom building, library, computer lab, and residence halls for students and full-time faculty and staff.

== Organization ==
The university has a volunteer Board of Directors composed of prominent Mongolian leaders from a wide range of sectors, including government, business, nonprofit and education. The board of directors is the fiduciary of Orkhon University and is an autonomous group that establishes its own policies.

== Academic programs ==
Orkhon University is organized into three schools: 1) School of Humanities, 2) School of Law, and 3) School of Economics and Business Management. The university offers more than 20 undergraduate degrees, as well as master's degrees in accounting, linguistics, education, business, law, social work, and public administration, and doctoral programs in education, linguistics, and accounting.

== Secondary school ==
Orkhon University manages an affiliated K-12 school, the Orkhon School, which currently has 350 full-time students enrolled. The school is Cambridge International Examinations (CIE) qualified at the primary and secondary levels.

== International partnerships ==
Orkhon University has international partnerships with a number of institutions, including Gimcheon University, Daegu University, the American University in Bulgaria, Otani University, Tokyo University of Social Welfare, the Soros Foundation, and the USA Peace Corps.

== Affiliation and accreditation ==
Orkhon University serves as vice president for international affairs for the Consortium of Universities and Colleges of Mongolia and is accredited by the Mongolian National Council for Education Accreditation.

== Notable alumni ==
- Khishgeegiin Nyambaatar, mayor of Ulaanbaatar

== External sources ==
- Orkhon University - Official Website
- Orkhon School - Official Website
- Orkhon University Facebook Page
