= Janlavyn Narantsatsralt =

Mongolian Prime Minister (1957–2007)

- Жанлавын Наранцацралт
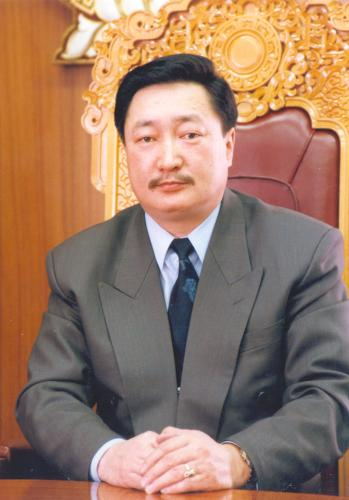
- Narantsatsralt in the late 1990s

20th Prime Minister of Mongolia
- In office 9 December 1998 – 22 July 1999
- President: Natsagiin Bagabandi
- Preceded by: Tsakhiagiin Elbegdorj
- Succeeded by: Nyam-Osoryn Tuyaa (acting)

Member of the State Great Khural
- In office 2000 – 12 November 2007

Mayor of Ulaanbaatar
- In office 1996 – December 1998
- Preceded by: Enebish Lhamsuren (Note: Office vacant between 1992 and 1996.)
- Succeeded by: Miyeegombyn Enkhbold (Note: Office vacant between December, 1998 and 1999.)

Personal details
- Born: 10 June 1957 Ulaanbaatar, Mongolia
- Died: 12 November 2007 (aged 50) Dundgovi, Mongolia
- Resting place: Altan-Ölgii National Cemetery
- Party: New National Party (2006–2007); Democratic Party (until 2006)
- Education: Belarusian State University; State University of Land Use Planning; National University of Mongolia
- Profession: Politician, lawyer, geodetic engineer

Janlavyn Narantsatsralt (Mongolian: Жанлавын Наранцацралт; 10 June 1957 – 12 November 2007) was a Mongolian politician who served as Prime Minister of Mongolia from December 1998 to July 1999 and Mayor of Ulaanbaatar from 1996 to 1998.

== Life ==
Narantsatsralt was born in 1957 in Ulaanbaatar. He was married with two children. He spoke Russian and Mongolian fluently.

=== Education and early years ===
He studied at the Belarusian State University and the State University of Land Use Planning in Moscow, graduating in 1981. Then he continued his studies at Moscow State University, earning a PhD in geographic sciences in 1990. Later, he visited a research institute in India and attended courses for urban and economic development in Japan and South Korea.

On returning from Moscow, he worked as an engineer and executive officer at the Institute of Soil Management. From 1989 to 1991, he was a scientist and head of department at the Institute of Soil Policy of the Ministry of Environment. Then he served as an expert and head of department in the municipal Office of Urban Design and Planning of Ulaanbaatar.

== Political career ==
Narantsatsralt was elected the mayor of Ulaanbaatar in 1996. His successful work in this position contributed to his appointment as the prime minister of Mongolia in December 1998. He was forced to resign eight months after the opposition Mongolian People's Revolutionary Party (MPRP) boycotted the State Great Khural over the privatization of a state bank.

=== Further career ===
From 1999 to 2000, Narantsatsralt worked as a lecturer and guest professor at the National University of Mongolia, in the faculty of geography and soil management. In the 2000 parliamentary elections, he won a seat in the State Great Khural. From 2006 until his death, he was a member of the parliament's permanent committee. From 2004, he also worked as the Chairperson of the Standing Committee of the Parliament for Infrastructure, and Minister of Construction and Urban Development.

In January 2006, he broke with his Democratic Party colleagues and voted with MPRP members against his own party's coalition government led by Tsakhiagiin Elbegdorj. Narantsatsralt then became minister of construction and urban development in the Miyeegombyn Enkhbold cabinet that followed. He and several other DP lawmakers who served in the MPRP government, including former prime minister Mendsaikhany Enkhsaikhan, were subsequently expelled from the DP and went on to form the splinter New National Party (NNP). Narantsatsralt was named chairman of the NNP in March 2007.

== Death ==
Narantsatsralt died on November 12, 2007, in a road accident while returning to Ulaanbaatar from Dundgovi Province after taking part in a youth forum.

== Notes ==
Political offices
Preceded by Tsakhiagiin Elbegdorj	Prime Minister of Mongolia; 1998-12-09 – 1999-07-22	Succeeded by Nyam-Osoryn Tuyaa
