= Malchin, Uvs =

District in Uvs Province, Mongolia

Coordinates: 49°43′39″N 93°16′07″E

Malchin District Малчин сум ᠮᠠᠯᠴᠢᠨᠰᠤᠮᠤ
- District
- Interactive map of Malchin District
- Country: Mongolia
- Province: Uvs Province
- Time zone: UTC+7 (UTC + 7)

Malchin (Mongolian: Малчин, herder) is a sum (district) of Uvs Province in western Mongolia.

== Administrative divisions ==
The district is divided into four bags, which are:

- Bayan-Erdene
- Bayankhairkhan
- Bayanmandal
- Tsalgar

== Notable natives ==
- Tsendiin Nyamdorj, politician
