= Dawn Dekle =

American international educator

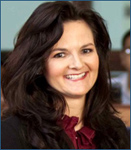

President and Dean Thomas Jefferson School of Law
- In office August 2024 – May 2025
- Preceded by: Kenneth Vandevelde

Personal details
- Born: January 2, 1967 Austin, Texas
- Died: May 27, 2025 (aged 58) San Diego, California

Dawn Dekle was an American international educator who served as the President and Dean of Thomas Jefferson School of Law

== Education ==
Dawn Dekle completed her undergraduate studies at Texas A&M University, going on to earn a Ph.D. in Experimental Psychology from Dartmouth College, and a J.D. from Stanford Law School.

== Work history ==
After earning her doctorate from Dartmouth, Dekle continued to serve as a visiting faculty member before accepting the position of assistant professor at James Madison University in Harrisonburg, Virginia. She has also served as an assistant professor at the National University of Singapore. When Singapore launched a new institution, Singapore Management University, Dekle became one of 12 pioneer professors to join the new university. She then became dean of the S P Jain School of Global Management and was instrumental in helping strengthen the curriculum, start an undergraduate program, and increase international recruiting for the school. In 2011 she was named provost of the American University of Afghanistan in Kabul, where she worked to expand program offerings and to increase recruitment and scholarship opportunities for female students. In 2013 she was named president of the American University of Iraq, Sulaimani, where she was the first female president of an Iraqi university. A lawyer by training, Dekle worked in both Afghanistan and Iraq to help bring Western-style law programs into the university curricula. She also led efforts at both institutions to obtain US accreditation. In July 2015 she became president of Orkhon University in Mongolia, where she led efforts to increase enrollment from across the nation, increase ties between the university and the international business community, and move the university toward implementing an all-English curriculum. She served at Orkhon until her appointment as president of the American University of Nigeria (AUN). In addition to her work in higher education, she has also worked McKinsey & Company, and was a council member for the Singapore Institute of International Affairs. Dekle served in her final post as the President and Dean at Thomas Jefferson School of Law in San Diego, California.
