= National Emergency Management Agency (Mongolia) =

Government agency of Mongolia

- Онцгой Байдлын Ерөнхий Газар
- Emblem of the Mongolian Emergency Management organization

Agency overview
- Formed: 7 January 2004; 22 years ago
- Preceding agencies: National Fire Department; National Civil Defence Department; State Reserve Department
- Jurisdiction: Government of Mongolia
- Headquarters: Ulaanbaatar, Mongolia
- Minister responsible: Deputy Prime Minister of Mongolia Khassuuriin Gankhuyag
- Agency executive: Gombojavyn Ariunbuyan, Major General, Chief of the NEMA
- Child agencies: Local Emergency Management Departments; National Rescue Brigade; Disaster Research Institute
- Website: nema.gov.mn

The National Emergency Management Agency (Mongolian: Онцгой байдлын ерөнхий газар, romanized: Ontsgoi Baidlyn yerönkhii gazar) or NEMA (ОБЕГ, OBYeG) is a paramilitary government agency overseeing emergency services in Mongolia. It was established with the duty to conduct nationwide post-disaster activities. Similar to the Russian Ministry of Emergency Situations in its mandate, it is responsible for developing environmental legislation as well as managing the fallout from natural disasters and conducting rescue work.

The Civil Defense Directorate of the Mongolian Armed Forces is the main executive body responsible for implementing civil defense measures, functioning under the direct authority of the Minister of Defense.

== History ==
The first civil defense in the country was established in 1964 as an affiliated service to the Mongolian People's Army. Emergency services in the country date back to 1922, when they were first formed at the initiative of the partisan leader Damdin Sükhbaatar. The unit established in the 1960s was known as the 122nd Civil Defense Battalion of the MPA as part of the expansion of the army. All citizens were obliged to participate in civil defense training organized by the Civil Defense Office of the Ministry of Defense. In 1982, there were 600 civil defense units in Mongolia. Since the 1980s, civil defense exercises have been directed toward the improvement of the operational stability of organizations and enterprises. The Law on the Civil Defense of Mongolia, adopted by the State Great Hural in 1994, stated that "civil defense is a complex of measures aimed at the prevention, protection, and rescue of the population and their property from afflictions caused by mass destruction weapons". In 1997, the Mongolian Armed Forces had 20,000 military personnel, 500 of whom were part of the civil defense forces. NEMA was established by the State Great Khural in January 2004 and is currently part of the Government of Mongolia. In 2017, a chemical branch was formed.

== Organization ==
=== General leadership and organizational structure ===
The Prime Minister of Mongolia is assigned as the head of the civil defense while the defense minister as the Chairman of the State Permanent Emergency Commission. The governors of administrative areas (provinces, capital city, soums, and districts), in their capacity as heads of local civil defense, are part of the civil defense system. It has branches in all 21 Aimags as well as the capital of Ulaanbaatar, which serves as a NEMA division and the national headquarters.

=== Units/Departments ===
- Western Region
  - Emergency Department of Khovd aimag
  - Emergency Department of Uvs aimag
  - Emergency Department of Bayan-Ulgii aimag
  - Emergency Department of Zavkhan aimag
  - Emergency Department of Govi-Altai aimag
- Northern Region
  - Emergency Department of Orkhon aimag
  - Emergency Department of Khuvsgul aimag
  - Emergency Department of Darkhan-Uul aimag
  - Emergency Department of Selenge aimag
  - Emergency Department of Arkhangai aimag
  - Emergency Department of Bulgan aimag
  - Emergency Department of Tuv aimag
- Eastern Region
  - Emergency Department of Dornod aimag
  - Emergency Department of Khentii aimag
  - Emergency Department of Sukhbaatar aimag
- Southern Region
  - Emergency Department of Umnugovi aimag
  - Emergency Department of Bayankhongor aimag
  - Emergency Department of Uvurkhangai aimag
  - Emergency Department of Dundgovi aimag
  - Emergency Department of Govisumber aimag
  - Emergency Department of Dornogovi aimag
- Ulaanbaatar Region
  - Capital City Emergency Department
  - Emergency Department of Baganuur District
  - Emergency Department of Bagakhangai District
  - Emergency Department of Bayangol District
  - Emergency Department of Bayanzurkh District
  - Emergency Department of Nalaikh District
  - Emergency Department of Songinokhairkhan District
  - Emergency Department of Sukhbaatar District
  - Emergency Department of Khan-Uul District
  - Emergency Department of Chingeltei District
- NEMA Units
  - National Rescue Brigade
  - Institute for Disasters
  - Training Center
  - Physical Sports and Technical Committee

== Activities ==
The Law on the Defense of Mongolia permits the Mongolian Armed Forces to be involved in civil defense activities. During the steppe fires in 1996, contingents of the armed forces participated in civil defense activities in 5-8 provinces. In the late 1960s, the Minister of Defense organized the Music Group of the Civil Defense, which has since 2009 been known as the Emergency Services Band and has provided military music at the emergency department level, as well as promoting NEMA in community, representing it at cultural events.

== Heads ==
- Ukhnaagiin Khürelsükh (2004–2006)
- P. Dash (30 May-24 June 2007)
- B. Jargalsaikhan (24 June 2007-?)
- Brigadier General T. Badral (2015–18 July 2020)
- Brigadier General Gombojavyn Ariunbuyan (since 18 July 2020)

== See also ==
- Civil defense by country
- National Emergency Management Agency (disambiguation)
