= National Emergency Management Agency =

National Emergency Management Agency may refer to multiple management agencies at the national level in different countries:

- National Emergency Management Agency (Australia)
- National Emergency Management Agency (South Korea)
- National Emergency Management Agency (Mongolia)
- National Emergency Management Agency (Nigeria)
- National Emergency Management Agency (New Zealand)

== See also ==
- Federal Emergency Management Agency, in the United States
- Ministry of Emergency Situations (disambiguation), in former Soviet countries
