= Mayor of Ulaanbaatar =

Head of the executive of the city of Ulaanbaatar, Mongolia

Governor of the Capital city and Mayor of Ulaanbaatar
- Нийслэлийн Засаг дарга бөгөөд Улаанбаатар хотын Захирагч
- Coat of arms of Ulaanbaatar
- Incumbent; Byaruuzanyn Pürevdagva since 26 May 2026
- Nominator: Citizens' Representatives Khural of the Capital City
- Appointer: Prime Minister of Mongolia
- Term length: 4 years
- Precursor: Chairperson of Executive administration of Ulaanbaatar city People's deputies Khural
- Inaugural holder: Moonongiin Bayar (1924-1926, as chairperson of provisional administration)
- Formation: 1924 (as chair of provisional administration); 1992 (current form)
- Website: ulaanbaatar.mn
- According to the Law on the legal status of Ulaanbaatar, the Capital city of Mongolia, the Governor of the Capital city holds the office of the Mayor of Ulaanbaatar.

The Mayor of Ulaanbaatar, (Note: Mongolian: Улаанбаатар хотын захирагч, or commonly referred to as Улаанбаатар хотын дарга) officially known as the Governor of the Capital city and Mayor of Ulaanbaatar, (Note: Mongolian: Нийслэлийн Засаг дарга бөгөөд Улаанбаатар хотын Захирагч) is the head of the executive branch of Ulaanbaatar, the capital city of Mongolia. The mayor's office administers all city services and public agencies, and enforces all city laws. The mayor is appointed to a four-year term by the Prime Minister of Mongolia and nominated by the Citizens' Representatives Khural of the Capital City, the city council of Ulaanbaatar.

As of May 2026, there have been 37 mayors of Ulaanbaatar since 1924. The incumbent mayor is Byaruuzanyn Pürevdagva.

== Mayor's Office ==
The Mayor's Office provides professional advice to the City Council and the Mayor of Ulaanbaatar. It also implements the Mayor's platform. It has the following structure:

- State Administrative Department
- Legal Department
- Social Policy Department
- Finance and Treasury Department
- Policy and Planning Department
- Foreign Relations Department
- Media and Public Relations Department
- Monitoring and Evaluation Department
- Military Staff

== List of mayors ==
- Moonongiin Bayar (1924–1926)
- Batsukh B (1926–1927)
- Gombojav Dulamjav (1927–1929, 1930–1931, 1936–1939)
- Mijiddorj Lkhamjav (1929–1930)
- Tsedendamba Badam (1931–1932)
- Ravdan Ulzii (July to August 1932)
- Dansranbilegiin Dogsom (1932–1933)
- Chimeddavaa Damdin (1933–1936)
- Tavkhai Lodoi (May 1939)
- Majig Ulziitsogt (1940–1941)
- Damdin Lombodonoi (July to August 1941)
- Luvsannavaan Erendoo (September to November 1941)
- Shagdar Sodnom (1942–1944)
- Bagaa Gund (1944–1956)
- Lamzav Badrakh (1956)
- Budiin Batjargal (1956–1959)
- Sanjiin Bataa (1959–1962)
- Luvsanchoimbol Mangaljav (1962–1965)
- Tsedev Dogsom (1965–1971)
- Sonomyn Luvsangombo (1971–1972)
- Balbar Surenjav (1972–1976)
- Tsend Ochir (1976–1978)
- Munkhjargal Sambuu (1978–1990)
- Enebish Lhamsuren (1990–1992)
- Baasanjav Tserendemberel (1992–1996)
- Janlavyn Narantsatsralt (1996–1998)
- Miyeegombyn Enkhbold (1999–2005)
- Tsogtyn Batbayar (2005–2007)
- Bilegt Tudev (2007–2008)
- Erdeniin Bat-Üül (7 August 2012 – 6 July 2016)
- Sunduin Batbold (6 July 2016 – 10 December 2018)
- Jantsangiin Batbayasgalan (Acting) (10 December 2018 – 27 February 2019)
- Sainbuyangiin Amarsaikhan (27 February 2019 – 1 July 2020)
- Jantsangiin Batbayasgalan (Acting) (1 July 2020 – 23 October 2020)
- Dolgorsürengiin Sumyaabazar (23 October 2020 – 12 October 2023)
- Khishgeegiin Nyambaatar (12 October 2023 - 16 May 2026)
- Byaruuzanyn Pürevdagva (since 26 May 2026)

== See also ==
- Ulaanbaatar
  - Citizens' Representatives Khural of the Capital City
- Politics of Mongolia
- President of Mongolia
