= Dolgorsürengiin Sumyaabazar =

Mongolian politician and athlete

Sumiyabazar Dolgorsüren
- Долгорсүрэнгийн Сумъяабазар
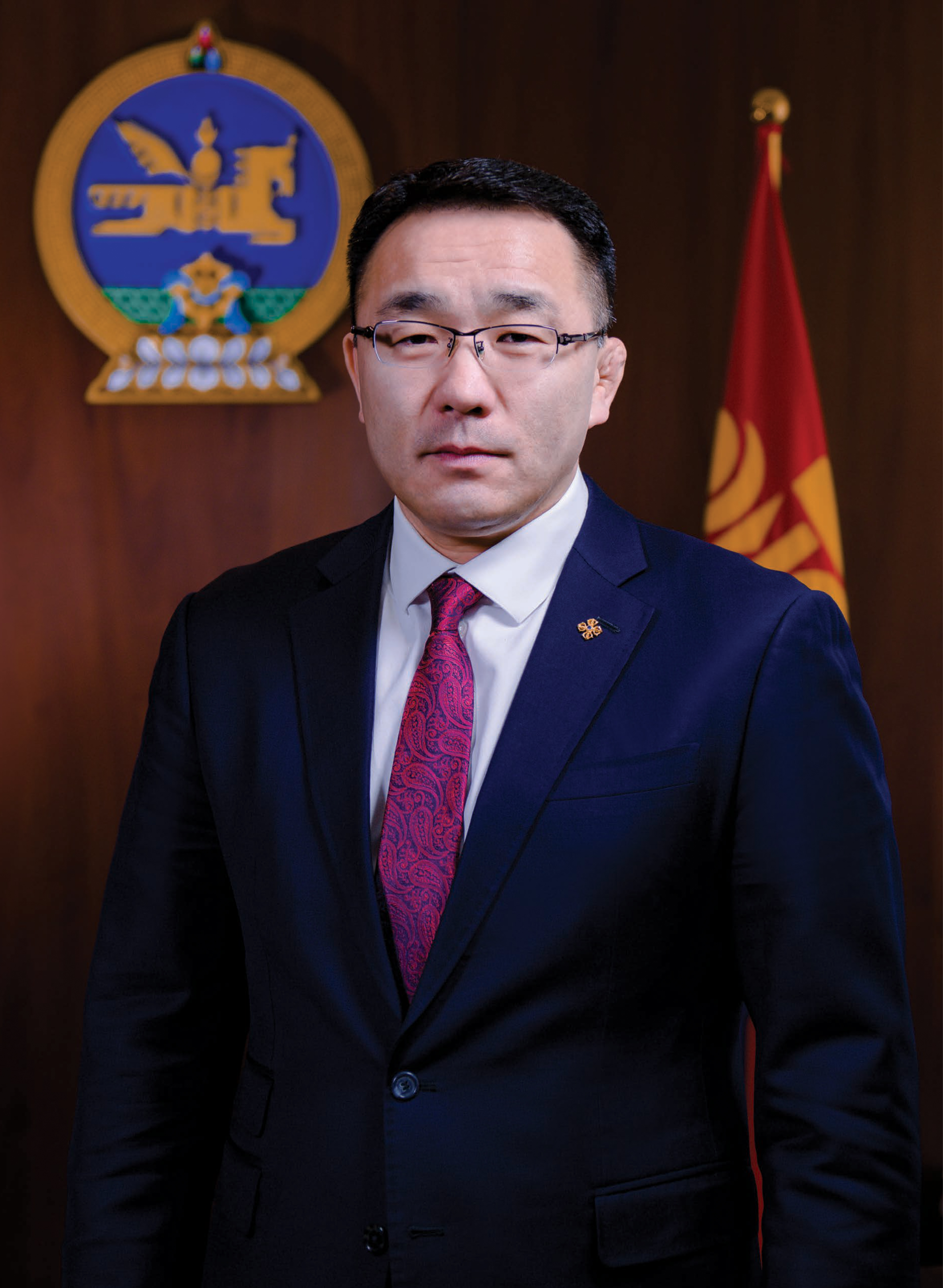

35th Mayor of Ulaanbaatar
- In office 23 October 2020 – 4 October 2023
- Preceded by: Jantsan Batbaysgalan (Acting)
- Succeeded by: Khishgeegiin Nyambaatar

Minister of Mining and Heavy Industry
- In office 17 October 2017 – 23 October 2020
- President: Khaltmaagiin Battulga
- Prime Minister: Ukhnaagiin Khürelsükh
- Preceded by: Tsedeviin Dashdorj
- Succeeded by: Gelengiin Yondon

Member of the State Great Khural
- In office 2013 – 23 October 2020
- Succeeded by: Batshugar Enkhbayar

Personal details
- Born: 7 January 1974 (age 52) Ulaanbaatar, Mongolia
- Party: Mongolian People's Party
- Height: 5 ft 10 in (178 cm)
- Spouse: Michidmaa Chuvaamid
- Children: 2
- Education: Mongolian University of Science and Technology

Sumiyabazar Dolgorsüren (Mongolian: Долгорсүрэнгийн Сумъяабазар, Sumiyabazar Dolgorsuren, [tɔːɮɢɔrsureːŋgiːŋ sʊmiaːpat͡sar]; also referred to as Sumiyabazar Dolgorsuren; born 7 January 1974) is a Mongolian politician and former freestyle wrestler. He is former Governor of the Capital City and Mayor of Ulaanbaatar and the Chairman of the Capital City MPP Committee. He was elected to the Parliament of Mongolia three times, served as a Member of Cabinet and Minister of Mining and Heavy Industry once.

In freestyle wrestling, he represented Mongolia in the Olympic Games and was a Mongolian national Bökh (wrestling) champion. In the 2020 local elections, Sumiyabazar led the Capital City MPP Committee to a landslide victory, after which he decided to resign from his position as a third-time Member of Parliament to lead the capital city as Governor and Mayor of Ulaanbaatar. Thus, he is one of few Mongolian politicians who has made non-standard decisions in terms of resigning from his MP position to become Mayor of the capital city. This resulted in him giving up his MP protection whilst taking up more political risks and responsibilities. He is the first Mongolian politician in history to relinquish his parliamentary privileges to take over an executive branch, working under the slogan “Towards the development of the new Ulaanbaatar City”.

== Early life and sports career ==
Sumiyabazar was born in the family of Dolgorsuren Donrov, on 7 October 1974. He has three brothers, all were successful wrestlers. Sumiyabazar's childhood was filled with athletic success. His father, Dolgorsuren Donrov is also a Mongolian national Bökh (wrestler) with the national zaan (elephant, Semi-final in National Naadam Wrestling) rank. Sumiyabazar finished 77th Secondary School of the Capital City in 1991. Afterwards, he graduated from the Mongolian University of Science and Technology with a bachelor's degree in Business Administration in 2005.

He is a national wrestling champion (Avarga title from National Naadam Wrestling), Asian Games silver medalist, Asian Championship silver medalist, East Asian Games gold medalist, and international master of freestyle wrestling. One of the significant highlights of Mongolian wrestling history is the wrestling match of the Naadam of 1997 where Sumiyabazar along with his brothers Sugarragchaa Dolgorsuren (the father of yokozuna sumo wrestler Byambasüren Sugarragchaa, known as Hōshōryū Tomokatsu), nachin rank wrestler Serjbudee Dolgorsuren, Dagvadorj Dolgorsuren (retired Yokozuna in sumo who used the name Asashōryū Akinori) and father Dolgorsuren Donrov all wrestled together.

Furthermore, he was elected as the Vice President of the Mongolian Freestyle Wrestling Federation and represented Mongolia at the Atlanta and Sydney Olympic Games.

=== Freestyle Wrestling ===
From 1987 to 1988, Sumiyabazar started training at the children's sport center “Soyol”, located in Bayangol District formerly known as Okyabriyn neighborhood, where his teachers where the People's Teacher and freestyle wrestling coach Mr. Damdinsharav Ch. and Mr. Ganbaatar N. Talking about his coach Ganbaatar, Sumiyabazar has said “Coach Damdinsharav left to work in Inner Mongolia and thus handed me over to coach Ganbaatar. In September of that year, when I joined the youth wrestling team, the foundation for my wrestling career formed. Initially, I used to wrestle standing on my right side but coach Ganbaatar changed it to my left side thus changing my wrestling technique 100%”.

1996-2000 – National freestyle wrestling champion and gold medalist/champion in the “Mongolgobi” international competition,

1996 – Silver medalist in the Asian division of the Freestyle Wrestling Championship Games,

1997 - East Asian Games gold medalist,

1996, 2000 – Participated in the Atlanta and Sydney Olympic Games,

1998 – Successfully participated in the World Freestyle Wrestling Championships and was name of the top 10 wrestlers in the world,

1998 – Award-winning place in the multiple World Championships,

1998 – Silver medalist in the Asian Games in addition to winning silver and bronze from international competitions in Turkey, Iran, Germany, Bulgaria, and Greece.

=== Mongolian National Wrestling ===
Sumiyabazar Dolgorsuren, after hearing advice from his coaches who said, “You don't need to rush into national wrestling”, did not start his national wrestling career until 1994 which was considered late compared to others. He later recalled “I would get caught wrestling in secret somewhere and would be scolded by my teachers. But until 1994, I consistently practiced my wrestling spending nearly 7 years in the yellow sports ground to the point where I could intuitively feel most of my opponent’s wrestling moves”. After 12 years, in 2006 During the Naadam festivities for the 800th anniversary of the Mongolian Empire, 85th anniversary of the People's Revolution, where 1024 wrestlers participated in the national wrestling match, Sumiyabazar won 10 rounds and was named a national wrestling champion.

== Business career ==
In 2003 Sumiyabazar appointed as the General Director of “ABC Development” LLC. Afterwards in 2006 he is appointed as the chairman of the board of directors for the National Investment Bank of Mongolia. National Investment Bank of Mongolia (NIBank) provides comprehensive services of a commercial bank and contributes to the economic stability in a way of participating in foreign and domestic financial markets to establish capital sources and finance large scale projects. In 2013 he nominated from the Mongolian People's Party (MPP) in the 26th parliamentary constituency and elected as a Member of Parliament and ended his business career.

== Political career ==
After receiving the national wrestling champion title in 2006, Sumiyabazar Dolgorsuren ended his sports career and officially began his political career in 2008. Subsequently, in 2008, he was elected to the City Council from the MPP giving him the chance to represent Songinokhairkhan District in the city council. Additionally, for the first time ever the MPP Steering Committee established the role of Secretary in Charge of the Capital City and appointed Sumiyabazar, which distinguishes his career from the rest. Thus in 2013, this became the starting point for taking a leadership role in the Capital City MPP Committee.

=== Political appointments ===
August 26, 2008 - Sumiyabazar joined the then Mongolia People's Revolutionary Party cell No.45 in the 6th Khoroo of Songinokhairkhan District and was elected Chairman of the cell and became a member of the MPP Conference,

2008-2012 – Elected as a Representative to the Capital City Council,

2012-2018 - Chairman of the Songinokhairkhan District MPP Committee,

2013-2017 - MPP's Secretary in Charge of the Capital City,

2013-2017 & 2019 - Member of the MPP Steering Committee,

September 22, 2018 - Sumiyabazar assumed the role of Chairman of the Capital City MPP Committee with a 50.4%

== Legislative career ==
Sumiyabazar was elected to the Parliament three times, in 2013, 2016, and 2020. Sumiyabazar Dolgorsuren was sworn in as a Member of Parliament on May 10, 2013, after winning 53.3% of the votes in the 26th constituency in the 2012 Parliamentary election.

During the 2016 Parliamentary election, in the 73rd constituency, Sumiyabazar ran for the MPP winning 52.5% of the vote and was re-elected as a Member of Parliament for the second time. In the 2020 Parliamentary election, Sumiyabazar was a candidate for the 26th constituency for MPP and was elected as a Member of Parliament for the third time. Subsequently, by the decision of the MPP Steering Committee, he resigned from his duties as a Member of Parliament on October 23, 2020, and was appointed as the Governor of the Capital City and Mayor of Ulaanbaatar.

=== Laws drafted and approved ===
2013: Amendments to the Law on Tobacco Control Draft

2014: Amendments to the Law on Corporate Income Tax Draft

2015: Amendments to the Law on the Parliamentary Elections of Mongolia Draft,

Amendments to the Law on Corporate Income Tax Draft,

Amendments to the Law on Energy and other related draft laws,

Draft Law on the Organization of Medical Care,

Draft Parliamentary Resolution on Organizing a referendum,

2016: Amendments to the Law on Pensions and Benefits from the Social Insurance Fund Draft,

Draft Parliamentary Resolution on Approving the Medium-term Program for the Development of Mongolia's Statistical Sector for 2016–2020,

2017: Amendments to the Law on the State-Church Relations Draft,

Draft Parliamentary Resolution on the Measures to Implement the Amendments to the Law on State-Church Relations,

Amendments to the Law on Central Bank Draft,

2018: Amendments to the Law on Education Draft

2019: Amendments to the Minerals Law,

Amendments to the Law on Minerals, Petroleum,

Amendments to the Law on Petroleum Products and Other Laws Draft,

Amendments to the Law on the Legal Status of the Industrial Technology Parks Draft,

=== Representing Songinokhairkhan district ===
Sumiyabazar Dolgorsuren was elected for the third time from the Songinokhairkhan District of the capital city which is home to around 10% of the country's total population and 30% of the capital city's total population. His vision was to develop the district into an industrial and business hub. In this context, the following activities have been implemented between 2016 and 2020, in which Sumiyabazar Dolgorsuren revealed his aim to develop the district region into a SMEs hub following large manufacturing plants.

From the 15,380 requests and petitions submitted 13,953 have been resolved.

He tripled his district's investment budget to MNT 82 billion.

By commissioning 7 kindergartens with 1,300 beds and 2 kindergartens with 240 beds, around 86% of the kindergarten age children in the Songinokhairkhan district were enrolled in kindergartens.

The initiative to build and hand over 4 schools with 2,240 seats, 2 dormitories with 170 beds and 2 gymnasiums, put an end to the practice of attending school in 3 shifts in the Songinokhairakhan District.

A total of 1 billion 750 million MNT was invested in scholarships for 58 college students in the district to study in foreign and domestic universities including language courses.

Within the district, 10.6 km of paved roads were commissioned.

More than 7,000 senior citizens were included in preventative health check-ups.

The “Worker’s green building”, previously burnt down, was rebuilt and put into operation.

Around 1.5 billion MNT was invested in providing street lights for Songinokhairkhan District.

== Minister of Mining and Heavy Industry ==
Sumiyabazar Dolgorsuren was appointed as a Cabinet Member and Minister of Mining and Heavy Industry of Mongolia during the Parliamentary plenary session on October 19, 2017, with an 89.6% vote. During his tenure as Minister, Sumiyabazar initiated the goal that “Mongolian citizens should be owners of their wealth” and thus in addition to implementing various major mining sector infrastructure projects, sourcing funding and organizing the transfer to state control, he was able to bring ownership to the 1072 shares of “Erdenes Tavantolgoi” JSC and reaffirm the decision to pay dividends which had been in discussion for nearly a decade.

He led the preparation completion of Tavantolgoi’s initial public offering on the international markets and the decision to pay dividends of MNT 96,480 for the 1072 shares.

As part of the goal of “For responsible mining”, 420 mining licenses were revoked, and 650 hectares of land were rehabilitated.

Through several negotiations, Minister Sumiyabazar, reduced the prices of gasoline and diesel fuel by 300-400 MNT per liter.

During his appointment, he was able to drastically increase mining sector revenues collected to the state budget which reached MNT 1.9 trillion in 2017, MNT 2.4 trillion in 2018 and MNT 2.92 trillion in 2019.

Pension loans of up to MNT 6 million were written off for nearly 229,400 senior citizens through the issuance of securities which will be repaid with revenues from the Salkhit silver deposit.

The Ministry of Mining and Heavy Industry led the launch of the “Tavantolgoi Tulsh” LLC and the commissioning of the first refined fuel plant which was critical in significantly reducing Ulaanbaatar's air pollution.

Furthermore, Minister Sumiyabazar also started the implementation of the Tavantolgoi-Zuunbayan 414 km railroad.

The construction works related to the infrastructure of the oil refinery to be built in the Altanshiree soum of Dornogobi aimag which includes railways, roads and power transmission lines were completed in October 2019.

The Ministry of Mining and Heavy Industry supported the formation of a research unit to investigate the establishment of an industrial and technological park based on the Tavan Tolgoi deposit including coal-chemical, coal-energy and methane gas production plants. The Ministry produced recommendations on the proposal to establish an industrial and technological park and supported this proposal at the policy level.

Based on the Erdenet Mining Corporation, a working group was formed to conduct research on the establishment of a mining-metallurgical-chemical industrial and technological park and a draft project proposal was created.

== Governor of the Capital City and Mayor of Ulaanbaatar ==
Sumiyabazar Dolgorsuren is the 34th Governor of the Capital City and Mayor of Ulaanbaatar. Since his appointment his has focused on implementing the Development of the New Ulaanbaatar program. As the Chairman of the Capital City MPP Committee, in the 2020 local elections, his team won 34 out of 45 seats in the Capital City Council. During his term in office, his administration will have the advantage of implementing the newly amended Law on Administrative and Territorial Units and their Management which will be followed by amendments to nearly 30 other related laws. In this regard, he has stated to become a Mayor that is committed to investment and development and that the future development of Ulaanbaatar city would be based on the following five key concepts, including:

1. City for Children and Youth

2. Green City

3. Safe City

4. City Without Traffic Congestion

5. Productive City

Following heavy flooding in Ulaanbaatar in early July 2023, Dolgorsuren was forced to resign as Mayor of Ulaanbaatar after widespread backlash across government officials and general anger amongst the public due to his handling of the crisis.

== Mongolian wrestling career record ==
Year	Level	Participants	Rank	Wins	Earned title	Notes
2008	State	512	State Champion	6		
2007	State	512	State Champion	6		
2006	State	1024	State Garuda	10	State Champion	
2005	State	512	State Garuda	8		
2004	State	512	State Garuda	7		
2003	State	512	State Elephant	8	State Garuda	
2002	State	512	State Elephant	6		
2001	State	1024	State Elephant	6		
2000	State	512	State Elephant	6		
1999	State	512	State Elephant	8		
1998	State	512	State Elephant	8		
1997	State	512	State Falcon	4		
1996	State	512	State Falcon	7	State Elephant	
1995	State	512	State Falcon	5		
1994	State	768	Unranked	5	State Falcon	
State Naadam Winner Won at least 5 rounds in State Naadam Aimag/Sum Naadam Promotion

== Mixed martial arts record ==
Professional record breakdown
3 matches	1 win	2 losses
By knockout	1	2

Res.	Record	Opponent	Method	Event	Date	Round	Time	Location	Notes
Win	1–2	Takeshi Tosa	TKO (punches)	Kokoro: Kill Or Be Killed	August 15, 2006	1	1:58	Tokyo, Japan	
Loss	0–2	Bob Sapp	TKO (foot injury)	K-1 Beast 2004 in Niigata	March 14, 2004	1	5:00	Niigata, Japan	
Loss	0–1	Tsuyoshi Kosaka	TKO (doctor stoppage)	NJPW: Ultimate Crush 1	May 2, 2003	1	2:58	Tokyo, Japan	

== Family and personal life ==
Sumiyabazar met Michidmaa Chuvaamed when they were students and in 1998 they got married. Michidmaa Chuvaamed, who was once crowned as the most beautiful woman of Mongolia (1991) and is the daughter of the People's Artist and Honorary Cultural Meritorious Person Chuvaamed L. They have two sons.
