= Social Democratic Youth (Mongolia) =

Mongolian youth wing

Social Democratic Youth Социал Демократ Монголын залуучуудын холбоо
- President: Byaruuzanyn Pürevdagva
- Secretary General: Boldbaataryn Galsan
- Founded: 5 April 1997
- Headquarters: Independence Palace, Ulaanbaatar
- Ideology: Social democracy (since 2010); Democratic socialism (1997–2010)
- Colours: Red
- Mother party: Mongolian People's Party
- International affiliation: International Union of Socialist Youth
- Website: sdy.mn

The Social Democratic Youth (Mongolian: Социал Демократ Монголын залуучуудын холбоо, СДМЗХ) is the national youth wing of the Mongolian People's Party (MPP), founded in 1997.

== History ==
The organization was established on 5 April 1997 to organize and represent politically active youth aligned with the ideologies of the Mongolian People's Revolutionary Party. It was originally founded as the "Mongolian Democratic Socialist Youth Federation" (Монголын Ардчилсан Социалист Залуучуудын Холбоо, МАСЗХ).

The organization was later renamed as the "Social Democracy–Mongolian Youth Association" (Нийгмийн Ардчилал–Монголын Залуучуудын Холбоо, НАМЗХ) on 17 September 2010, following the rebranding of the mother party's modern social democratic framework. The group serves as a training ground for future Mongolian leaders. Prominent politicians, including cabinet ministers or members of the State Great Khural, have previously served within its executive ranks.

== Activities ==
The Social Democratic Youth focuses on civic education, public policy advocacy, and increasing youth voter turnout in Mongolia. Domestically across the provinces (aimags), it organizes annual leadership camps and regional youth forums.

== Structure and leadership ==
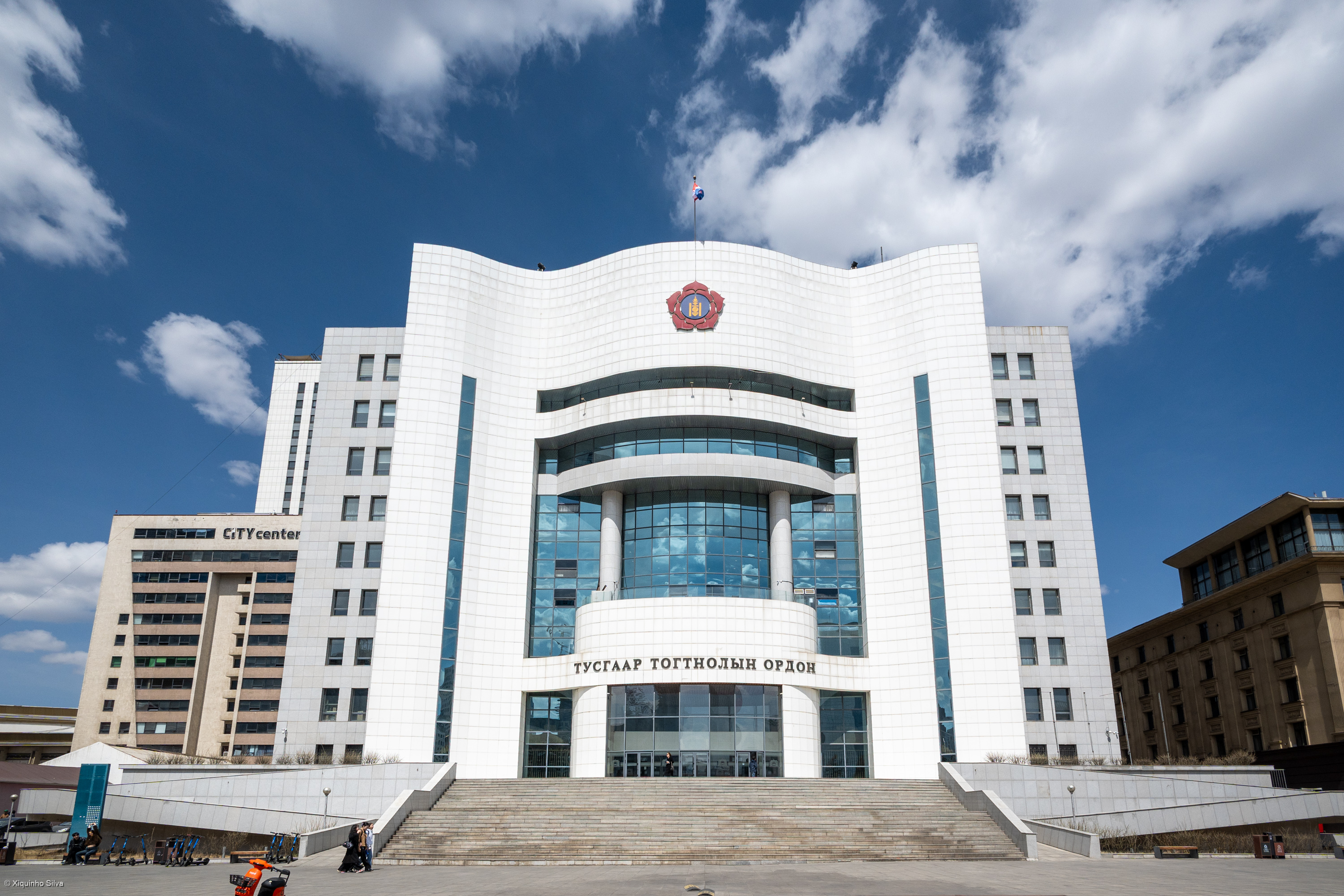
Independence Palace, the headquarters of the Mongolian People's Party since 2011

The organization is headquartered at the Independence Palace in Ulaanbaatar, where the daily administration of the association is directed by a President and Secretary General, who work with a national board.

- President: Byaruuzanyn Pürevdagva
- Secretary General: Boldbaataryn Galsan

This board includes several vice presidents and regional secretaries who manage specific areas such as youth employment, foreign relations, and regional chapters. The leadership features prominent national figures, including members of the State Great Khural serving as vice presidents.

=== Presidents ===
- Ukhnaagiin Khürelsükh (1997–1998; 2000–2005)
- U.Ulambayar (1998–2000)
- Gombojavyn Zandanshatar (October 2005–2010)
- Luvsannamsrain Oyun-Erdene (17 September 2010–21 June 2015)
- Nyamtaishiryn Nomtoibayar (2013–2015) (acting)
- Ganzorigiin Temüülen (21 June 2015–8 July 2019)
- Nyam-Osoryn Uchral (8 July 2019–15 September 2024)
- Byaruuzanyn Pürevdagva (15 September 2024–present)

== See also ==
- Mongolian People's Party
- Politics of Mongolia
