= Danzangiin Lündeejantsan =

Mongolian politician

Danzangiin Lundeejantsan
- Данзангийн Лүндээжанцан

Chairman of the State Great Khural
- In office June 2007 – August 2008
- Preceded by: Tsendiin Nyamdorj
- Succeeded by: Damdiny Demberel

Personal details
- Born: 25 November 1957 (age 68) Ulaanbaatar, Mongolia
- Party: Mongolian People's Party

Danzangiin Lundeejantsan (Mongolian: Данзангийн Лүндээжанцан, Danzangiin Lundeejantsan; born 25 November 1957) is a Mongolian politician who was Chairman of the State Great Khural from January 2007 to November 2008 and Vice Chairman of the Great Khural from 2004 to 2007. He has been a member of the State Great Khural, the Mongolian parliament, since 1990.

In addition, D.Lundeejantsan is the founder of the first private law school in Mongolia which is now Shihihutug University. Before 1990, the National University of Mongolia was the sole institution providing professional legal education in Mongolia. Following the victory of the Democratic Revolution, a shift in policy allowed for the acceptance of diverse forms of property ownership, paving the way for the establishment of Shihihutug University.

This institution became the first to realize the ambition and vision of founding a private university while introducing a new curriculum in legal education. The university's name, Shihihutug, was given by its founder, D. Lundeejantsan.
