= Tsendiin Nyamdorj =

Mongolian politician

- Цэндийн Нямдорж
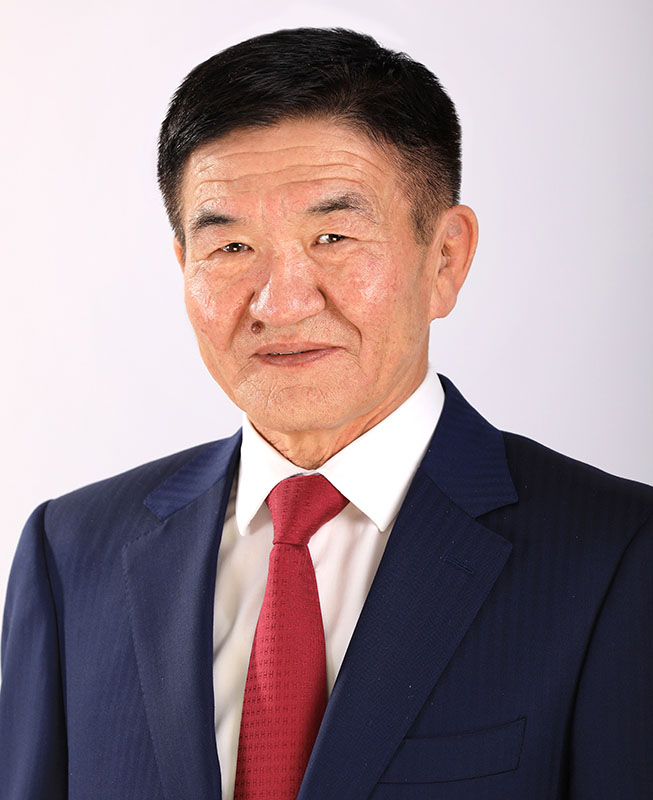

Minister of Justice and Internal Affairs
- In office 1 September 2009 – 3 December 2024
- President: Khaltmaagiin Battulga
- Preceded by: Sandag Byambatsogt
- Succeeded by: Khishgeegiin Nyambaatar
- In office 2008–2012
- President: Nambaryn Enkhbayar; Tsakhiagiin Elbegdorj
- Preceded by: Tsendiin Mönkh-Orgil
- Succeeded by: Khishigdemberel Temuujin (Minister of Justice)
- In office 2001–2005
- President: Natsagiin Bagabandi
- Preceded by: Dash Ganbold
- Succeeded by: Batbold Sandui

Chairman of the State Great Khural
- In office July 2005 – June 2007
- Preceded by: Nambaryn Enkhbayar
- Succeeded by: Danzangiin Lundeejantsan

Personal details
- Born: 10 August 1956 (age 69) Uvs Province, Mongolian People's Republic
- Party: Mongolian People's Party

Tsendiin Nyamdorj (Mongolian: Цэндийн Нямдорж; born 10 August 1956) is a Mongolian politician. He served as Minister of Justice and Internal Affairs from 2017 to 2020 and the Chairman of the State Great Khural from 2005 to 2007.

== Life ==
Nyamdorj was born 1956 in the Malchin sum of Uvs Aimag (province). Nyamdorj is a member of the Dörvöd tribe.

He studied law in Leningrad and made his degree in 1981. After that he worked as an attorney general. From 1988 he worked for the council of ministers. Between 1990 and 1992 he was deputy minister of justice. Since 1992 he is a member of Parliament for the Mongolian People's Revolutionary Party (changed name to the Mongolian People's Party in 2010), representing the 39th constituency in Uvs Aimag.

From 2000 to 2004 he served as Minister of Justice and the Interior.

In 2005, he succeeded Nambaryn Enkhbayar as the Chairman of the State Great Khural. In April 2007, the Constitutional Court of Mongolia decided that Nyamdorj had violated the constitution by unilaterally changing the text of several laws from the version approved by parliament. The DP fraction demanded that Nyamdorj resign, but the MPRP dominating the parliament tried to help him to keep his position as chairman. He resigned on June 12, 2007.
