= Nyam-Osoryn Tuyaa =

Mongolian politician (born 1958)

- Ням-Осорын Туяa
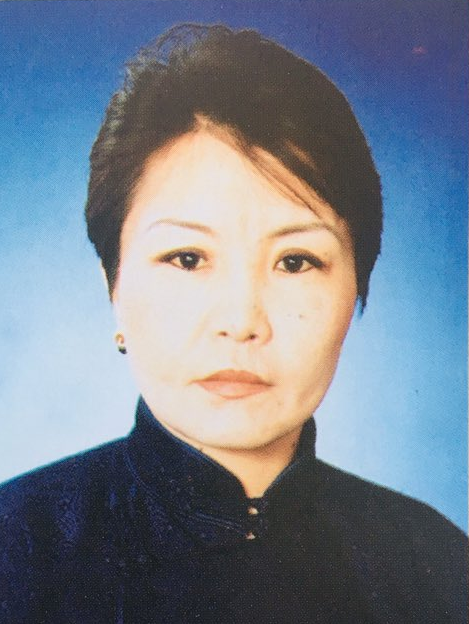

Acting Prime Minister of Mongolia
- In office 22 July 1999 – 30 July 1999
- President: Natsagiin Bagabandi
- Preceded by: Janlavyn Narantsatsralt
- Succeeded by: Rinchinnyamyn Amarjargal

Personal details
- Born: 1958 (age 66–67)
- Political party: Democratic Party

Nyam-Osoryn Tuyaa (Mongolian: Ням-Осорын Туяa; born 1958) is a former Mongolian politician, and the acting Prime Minister from 22 to 30 July 1999. She also served as Chairperson of the 55th session of the United Nations Economic and Social Commission for Asia and the Pacific (ESCAP).

Tuyaa was the foreign minister in the Democratic Party-led government under Janlavyn Narantsatsralt, being appointed in 1998. When this government was forced to resign the following year, she became acting Prime Minister for a short time before parliament elected Rinchinnyamyn Amarjargal. She then served as foreign minister in the new government until it was defeated in the 2000 elections. She lost her seat in parliament (for a district in Khentii Province) in the same elections, which saw the People's Revolution Party win all but four seats.

Political offices
Preceded by Janlavyn Narantsatsralt	Prime Minister of Mongolia; Acting; 1999	Succeeded by Rinchinnyamyn Amarjargal
