= Ölziisaikhany Enkhtüvshin =

Mongolian politician (born 1958)

Ölziisaikhany Enkhtüvshin Өлзийсайханы Энхтүвшин
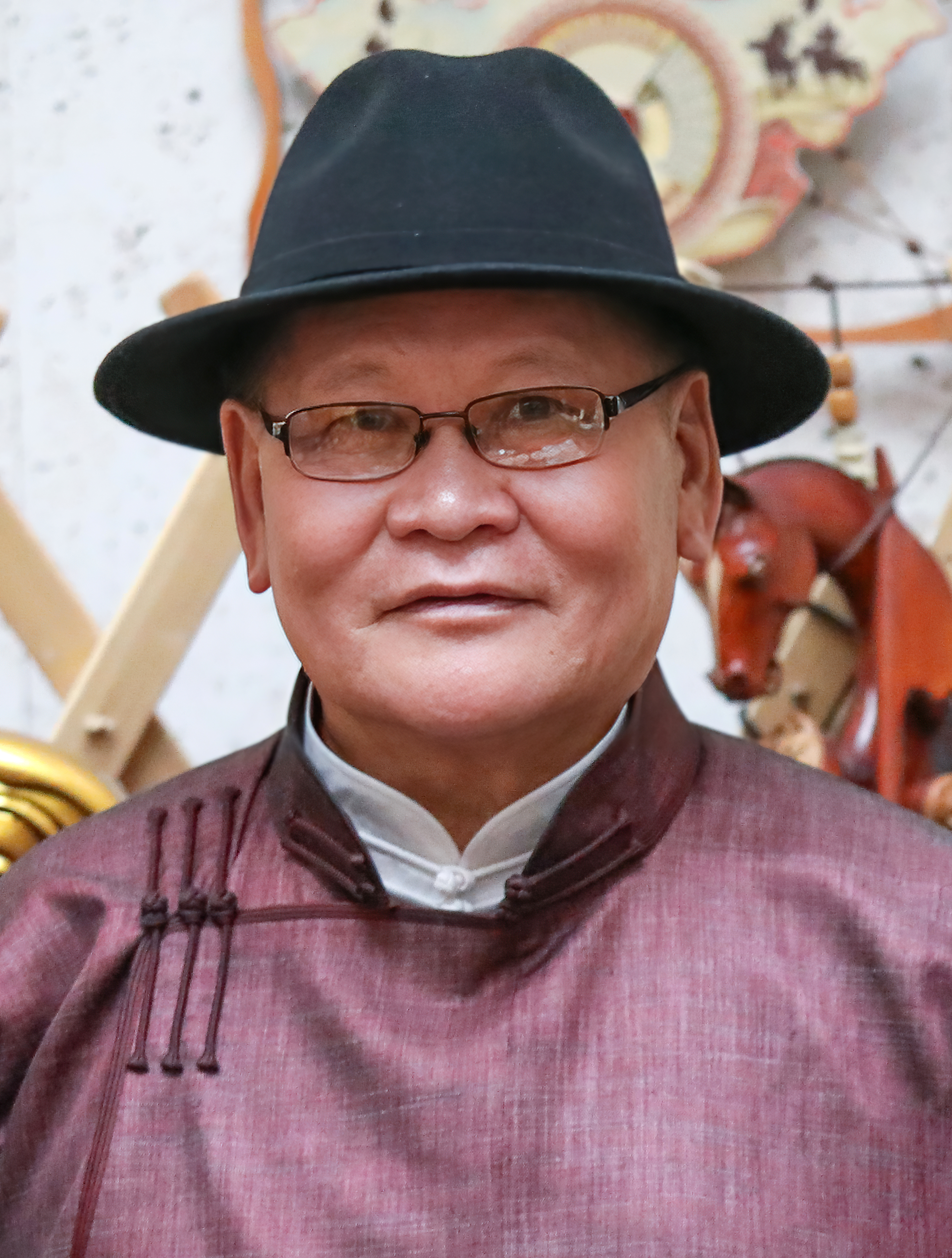
- Ölziisaikhany in 2023

Deputy Prime Minister of Mongolia
- In office 18 October 2017 – 8 July 2020
- Prime Minister: Ukhnaagiin Khürelsükh
- Preceded by: Ukhnaagiin Khürelsükh
- Succeeded by: Yangugiin Sodbaatar

Minister of Education and Science
- In office 2006–2007

Chairman of the Mongolian People's Party
- In office 25 July 2012 – 21 November 2013
- Prime Minister: Miyeegombyn Enkhbold
- Preceded by: Sükhbaataryn Batbold
- Succeeded by: Miyeegombyn Enkhbold

Personal details
- Born: 30 October 1958 (age 67) Tsagaan-Uul, Khövsgöl Province, Mongolian People's Republic
- Party: Mongolian People's Revolutionary Party
- Education: National University of Mongolia
- Occupation: History teacher Researcher; Journalist; Parliamentarian

Ölziisaikhany Enkhtüvshin (Mongolian: Өлзийсайханы Энхтүвшин; born 30 October 1958) is a Mongolian politician who was Chairman of the Mongolian People's Party from 25 July 2012 to November 2013 and Deputy Prime Minister in the government of Ukhnaagiin Khürelsükh from October 2017.

== Biography ==
Enkhtüvshin was born in 1958 in Tsagaan-Uul, Khövsgöl Province. He studied history at the Mongolian State University where he obtained his doctorate in 1989.

Between 1990 and 1995, he was a journalist for Ardyn Erkh covering parliament. He later became editorial director of the MPP's official newspaper Ünen, and secretary-general of the Mongolian People's Revolutionary Party, Ulaanbaatar section.

In 2000 he was elected to the State Great Khural (parliament) representing a district in Khövsgöl Province and was named cabinet secretary in the government of prime minister Nambaryn Enkhbayar.

He failed in his reelection bid in 2004 but in 2006 was appointed Minister of Education, Culture and Science in the government of Miyeegombyn Enkhbold. In June 2008 he was once again elected to parliament.

Although the legislative elections of 28 June 2012 saw the defeat of the MPP, Enkhtüvshin was nevertheless reelected to parliament and was named chairman of the MPP following the resignation of Sükhbaataryn Batbold. Enkhtuvshin was formally elected to the leadership position on 25 July.

In November 2013, Miyeegombyn Enkhbold replaced Enkhtüvshin as MPP chairman.

On 18 October 2017 Enkhtüvshin was named deputy prime minister under the newly appointed prime minister Ukhnaagiin Khürelsükh after he ran second for the Prime Minister candidacy at the party plenum.

== Notes ==
Party political offices
Preceded by Sükhbaataryn Batbold	General Secretary of the Mongolian People's Party; 2012–2013	Succeeded by Miyeegombyn Enkhbold
