= Citizens' Representatives Khural of the Capital City =

Local council of Ulaanbaatar, Mongolia

Citizens' Representatives Khural of the Capital City Нийслэлийн иргэдийн Төлөөлөгчдийн Хурал
- 9th Citizens' Representatives Khural of the Capital City

Type
- Type: Unicameral

History
- Founded: 23 September 1992; 33 years ago
- Preceded by: Ulaanbaatar City People's Khural

Leadership
- Chairperson: Dashnyamyn Ikhbayar, Mongolian People's Party

Structure
- Seats: 45
- Political groups: Mongolian People's Party (40) Democratic Party (5)
- Length of term: 4 years

Elections
- Voting system: Majoritarian representation
- Last election: 11 October 2024
- Next election: 2028

Meeting place
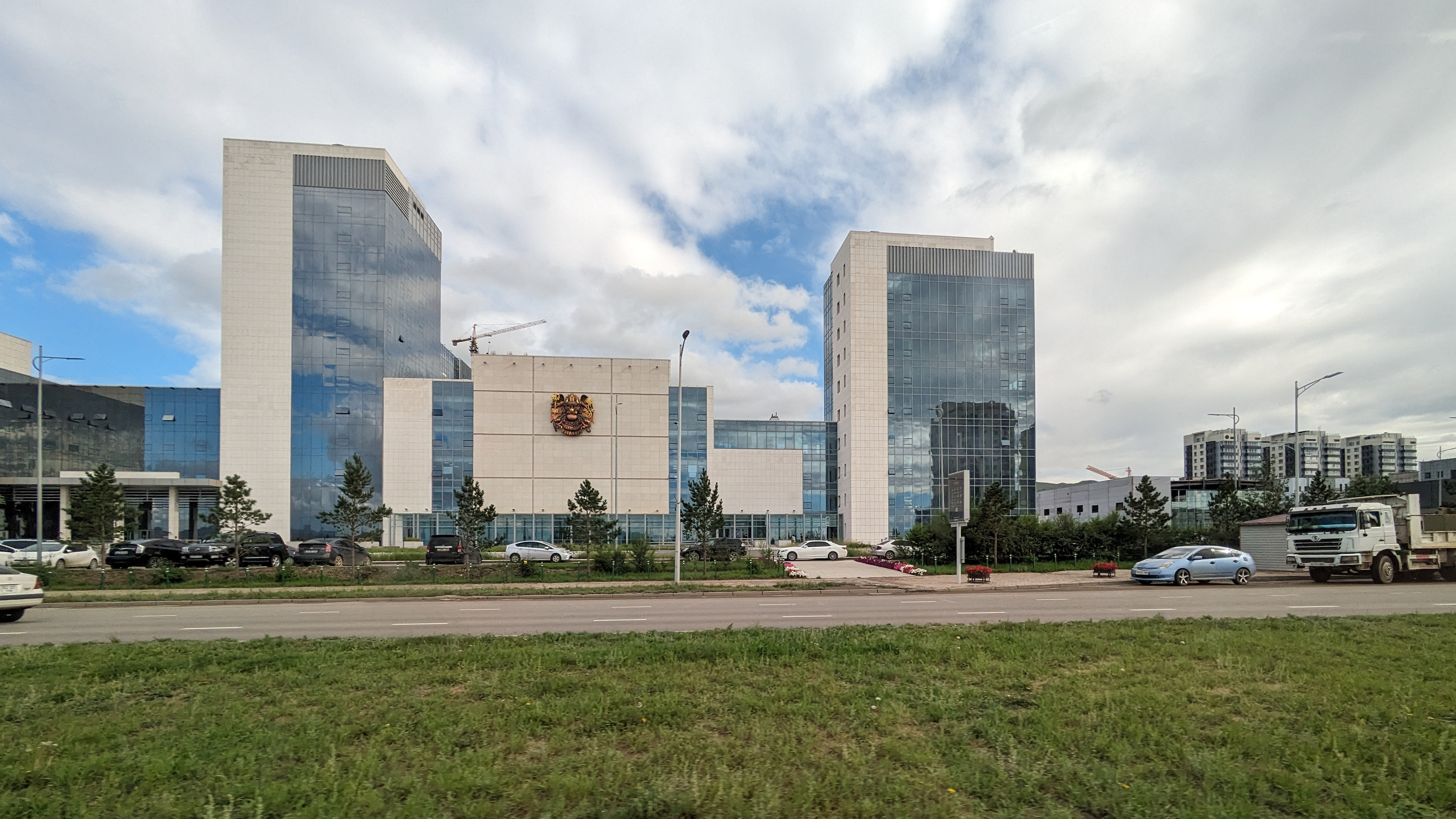
- Ulaanbaatar City Hall, Naadamchdiin Road 1200, Khan-Uul District 23th Khoroo, Ulaanbaatar

Website
- Official website

Ulaanbaatar City Council, officially the Citizens' Representatives Khural of the Capital City (Mongolian: Нийслэлийн иргэдийн Төлөөлөгчдийн Хурал, НИТХ, romanized: Niisleliin irgediin Tölöölögchdiin Khural, NITKh), is the local self-governing body of Ulaanbaatar, the capital of Mongolia. The council is responsible for enacting and amending city ordinances, approving the budget, and nominating the Mayor of Ulaanbaatar.

== History ==
=== 1924–1992 ===
In 1924, after the ratification of the 1924 Constitution and the subsequent establishment of the Mongolian People's Republic, a local governing body for the newly renamed capital, Ulaanbaatar, was established. The body had several name changes throughout the socialist period:

- City Khural (1924–1948)
- Ulaanbaatar city Laborers' Representatives Khural (1948–1962)
- Ulaanbaatar city People's Deputies Khural (1962–1989)
- Ulaanbaatar City People's Khural (1989–1992)

After the 1992 Constitution was ratified, the body was renamed the Citizens' Representatives Khural of the Capital City.

=== Since 1992 ===
On 21 August 1992, the newly established unicameral legislature, the State Great Khural, issued Resolution No. 23 to take relevant measures for the implementation of the Law on Administrative and Territorial Units of Mongolia and their management. This resolution instructed the reorganization of the local khurals and the appointment of governors by September 1992. There was no specific law on the organization of local elections; however law on Administrative and Territorial Units and their management amended new chapters on management of administrative and territorial units (Chapter II), a management system (Chapter II, Article 7), and its establishment (Chapter II, Article 9) accordingly. The reorganization of local and capital-city khurals and the appointment of governors were completed on 10 and 20 September, without an election campaign. Community and public meetings were held across the 12 districts and 119 khoroos of the capital city. Each khoroo elected five delegates for its district. The number of nominated capital representatives was proportional to the population in each city district. Ultimately, 72 out of the total 137 nominations were elected to the new city council.

The first session of the 1st Ulaanbaatar City Council was convened on 23 September 1992.

== Current composition ==
In the 2024 local elections, 40 candidates from Mongolian People's Party, 5 candidates from Democratic Party were elected to the council from twelve electoral districts in Ulaanbaatar's nine düüregs.

Political party	Seats	+/–
Mongolian People's Party	40	+6
Democratic Party	5	–3
Total	45	–

== Historical composition ==
MPP / Democratic / MSDP / Independent / MGP / Republican / JC / CWGP / HUN
1992	58 / 3 / 1 / 10
1996	23 / 9 / 6 / 1 / 1
2000	39 / 1
2004	37 / 2 / 1
2008	36 / 9
2012	14 / 26 / 4 / 1
2016	34 / 11
2020	34 / 8 / 3
2024	40 / 5

== Chairmen of the City Council ==
No.	Portrait	Name	Time in office		Political party
No.	Portrait	Name	Took office	Left office	Political party
1		Jigjidsürengiin Yadamsüren	23 September 1992	18 October 1996	MPRP
2		Tserendembereliin Baasanjav	18 October 1996	16 October 2000	MPRP
3		Tüdeviin Bilegt	16 October 2000	3 November 2004	MPRP
4		Nordovyn Bolormaa	3 November 2004	2007	MPRP
5		Gombosürengiin Mönkhbayar	2007	10 December 2008	MPRP
6		Tüdeviin Bilegt	10 December 2008	9 July 2012	MPRP→MPP
7		Dashjamtsyn Battulga	9 July 2012	31 October 2016	Democratic
8		Tsendiin Sandui	31 October 2016	6 December 2017	MPP
9		Sainbuyangiin Amarsaikhan	6 December 2017	28 February 2019	MPP
10		Rentsendagvyn Dagva	28 February 2019	23 October 2020	MPP
11		Jantsangiin Batbayasgalan	23 October 2020	14 October 2024	MPP
12		Amarbayasgalangiin Bayar	14 October 2024	27 April 2026	MPP
13		Dashnyamyn Ikhbayar	1 May 2026	Incumbent	MPP

== See also ==
- Mayor of Ulaanbaatar
- Ulaanbaatar
- Districts of Ulaanbaatar
- Administrative divisions of Mongolia
