= Miyeegombyn Enkhbold =

Prime Minister of Mongolia from 2006 to 2007

Miyegombyn Enkhbold
- Миеэгомбын Энхболд
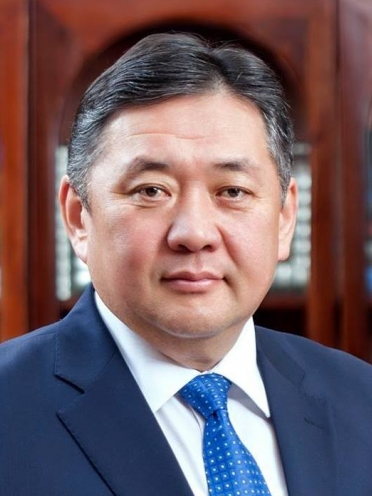
- Enkhbold in 2017

Chairman of the State Great Khural
- In office 5 July 2016 – 1 February 2019
- Preceded by: Zandaakhüügiin Enkhbold
- Succeeded by: Gombojavyn Zandanshatar

Chairman of the Mongolian People's Party
- In office 21 November 2013 – 21 November 2017
- Preceded by: Ölziisaikhany Enkhtüvshin
- Succeeded by: Ukhnaagiin Khürelsükh

24th Prime Minister of Mongolia
- In office 25 January 2006 – 22 November 2007
- President: Nambaryn Enkhbayar
- Preceded by: Tsakhiagiin Elbegdorj
- Succeeded by: Sanjaagiin Bayar

Member of the State Great Khural
- In office 2005–2020

Mayor of Ulaanbaatar
- In office 1999–2005
- Preceded by: Janlavyn Narantsatsralt (Note: Office vacant between December, 1998 and 1999.)
- Succeeded by: Tsogtyn Batbayar

Personal details
- Born: 19 July 1964 (age 61); Ulaanbaatar, Mongolian People's Republic
- Political party: Mongolian People's Party

Miyegombyn Enkhbold (Mongolian: Миеэгомбын Энхболд, Miyégombīn Enhbold; born 19 July 1964) is a Mongolian politician who was the 24th Prime Minister of Mongolia from January 2006 to November 2007 and deputy prime minister from 2007 to 2012. He has been Chairman of the State Great Khural, the Mongolian parliament, from 2016 to 2019.

From 2005 until October 2007, Enkhbold was the chairman of the Mongolian People's Revolutionary Party (MPRP, later MPP). He also served for a time as Mayor of Ulaanbaatar, the capital. Following his party's defeat in the 2012 general election, he was appointed Vice Chairman of the State Great Khural. He was elected twice as party chairman in the 27th Congress of the Mongolian People's Party. In 2016, when the MPP gained control of parliament, he was elected as Chairman of the State Great Khural.

== Education and early life ==
He finished school in 1982 and started studying in 1983. He earned an undergraduate diploma from the National University of Mongolia, majoring in centrally planned economy in 1987.

From 1987, he worked as an economist with the Services Office of the Executive Authority of the Assembly of People's Deputies of Ulaanbaatar. In 1989 he became a specialist in the Department of Planning and Service Mechanics of the Public Services Ministry. In 1991, he returned to head the municipal Services Office. Enkhbold is married and has two children.

== Joining MPRP and municipal politics ==
Enkhbold joined the MPRP in 1990, the same year when the MPRP Politburo resigned, and the democratic process began in Mongolia.

The MPRP appointed Enkhbold as a Deputy Governor of the Chingeltei District of Ulaanbaatar from 1992 to 1996, and as Chairman of the Presidium of the Chingeltei Districts Khural of Citizens Representatives from 1996 to 1997.

The MPRP appointed him as the chairman of the MPRP's Council in Ulan Bator from 1997 to 2005. In 1999, he was elected as mayor of Ulan Bator by the MPRP dominated Ulan Bator's People's Representative's Hural. During his appointment as mayor he worked to re-allocate brownfield land in central Ulaanbaatar for development in order to address the city's well documented housing shortage.

== National politics ==
Enkhbold contributed to the presidential campaign of Nambaryn Enkhbayar in 2005. When Enkhbayar became the President of Mongolia, he had to give up the position of Chairman of the MPRP. That position then fell to Enkhbold.

In January 2006, the MPRP decided to withdraw from the coalition, and its ten ministers resigned. This meant that more than half of the ministerial positions were vacant, so the parliament had no choice but to dissolve the government, removing Elbegdorj from power. The MPRP felt strong enough for this step because a DP member in parliament had switched to the MPRP a few days before, giving them exactly half the seats. The votes of four more DP members supporting the change (later to be rewarded with ministerial positions) resulted in an effective MPRP majority. In this configuration, and on the nomination of President Enkhbayar, the parliament approved Enkhbold as the new prime minister on January 25, 2006.

Enkhbold submitted his resignation to parliament on November 5, 2007, and parliament accepted it on November 8; Enkhbold remained in office until Bayar was elected on 22 November 2007.

In Bayar's government, Enkhbold was appointed as deputy prime minister on December 5, 2007.

In June 2016, the Mongolian People's Party (the word 'Revolutionary' was dropped from the party name in 2010) gained 85% of the seats in Parliament. The current chairman was unseated and Enkhbold was elected as chairman of the State Great Khural.

== Sources ==
- news.bbc.co.uk BBC report about the government change
- Mongolia Prime Minister M.Enkhbold Resigns Mongolia Prime Minister M.Enkhbold Resigns (The UB Post)

Party political offices
Preceded by Nambaryn Enkhbayar	General Secretary of the Mongolian People's Party; 2005-2007	Succeeded by Sanjaagiin Bayar
Political offices
Preceded by Tsakhiagiin Elbegdorj	Prime Minister of Mongolia; 2006-2007	Succeeded by Sanjaagiin Bayar
