= Administrative divisions of Mongolia =

Territory of Mongolia is divided into provinces (аймаг, often transcribed as aimag) and the capital (нийслэл, niislel) Ulaanbaatar. Provinces are subdivided into "sums" (сум, often transcribed as soum), sums into bags (баг, sometimes transcribed as bagh). Ulaanbaatar is divided into municipal districts (дүүрэг, usually translated as district), which are further subdivided into khoroos (хороо, most often translated as subdistrict).

== Administrative units ==
As of 2025, Mongolia has 21 aimags, 330 sums, 1647 bags, 9 municipal districts, and 204 khoroos. While sums always have a permanent settlement as an administrative center, many bags do not.

Level	1st	2nd	3rd
Type	Capital city (нийслэл niislel)	Municipal district (дүүрэг düüreg)	Municipal subdistrict (хороо khoroo)
Type	Province (аймаг aimag)	District (сум sum)	Subdistrict (баг bag)
