= Dogsomyn =

Dogsomyn (Mongolian: Догсомын) is a masculine given name. Notable people with the name include:

- Dogsomyn Bodoo, Mongolian politician
- Dogsomyn Ganbold, Mongolian politician
