= Enkhjargal Davaasuren =

Mongolian lawyer and activist

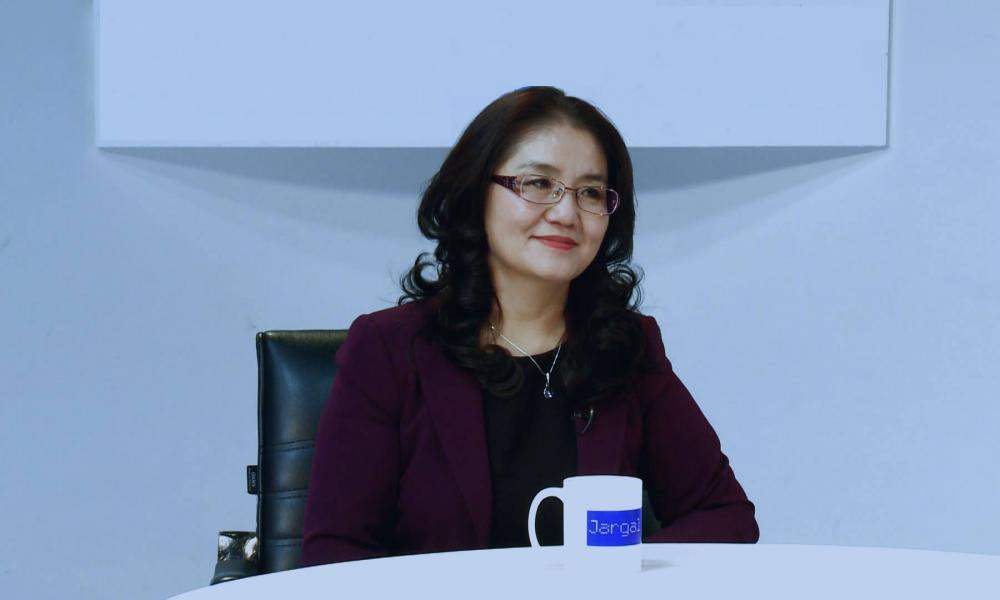
Enkhjargal Davaasuren

Enkhjargal Davaasuren (Mongolian: Даваасүрэнгийн Энхжаргал) is a Mongolian lawyer. Between 2001 and 2018, she was the director of the National Centre Against Violence. Since 2018, she has been the National Coordinator of the MONFEMNET National Network for Human Rights and Gender Justice.

== Life ==
Davaasuren's mother used to work as a trade union leader. As a lawyer, Davaasuren has focused on violence against women and children. She started working as a legal counsellor at the National Centre Against Violence in 1997, for which she later became the Director. She was the Director of the centre between 2001 and 2018.

Noticing a lack of legal framework to protect victims of violence, she started to work on the creation of such a framework. She also started a campaign to criminalize domestic violence by law, which the State Great Khural, the Mongolian Parliament, did in 2004. The first Domestic Violence Law was, however, not fully comprehensive, and after the work of Davaasuren and colleagues, the Mongolian Parliament adopted the revised Domestic Violence Law in 2016, a law that made domestic violence recognised as a crime.

Since 2018, Davaasuren is the National Coordinator of the MONFEMNET National Network for Human Rights and Gender Justice. She is also a National Gender Expert and a member of the National Gender Committee.
