= Iosif Kaminsky =

Belarusian activist (1887–1938)

Iosif Bentsionovich Kaminsky
- Born: April 17, 1887; Yelisavetgrad, Kherson Governorate, Russian Empire
- Died: April 4, 1938 (aged 50); Biysk, Altai Krai, Soviet Union
- Cause of death: Execution
- Occupation: Physician
- Spouse: Zinaida Georgievna Shub
- Parents: Bentsion Kaminsky (father); Pesya Kaminskaya (mother)

Iosif Bentsionovich Kaminsky (Hebrew: יוסף קמינסקי; April 17, 1887 – April 4, 1938) was one of the leaders of the Zionist movement in the Soviet Union in the 1930s, a member of the Central Committee of the Labour Zionist Party of the Soviet Union, and a political prisoner.

== Biography ==
Kaminsky was born on 17 April 1887 in Yelisavetgrad (now Kropyvnytskyi) into the family of bakery owners and flour merchants Bentsion and Pesya Kaminsky. He graduated from the municipal school in Yelisavetgrad, and in 1904–1905 studied at the Odesa Milling School. For participating in revolutionary meetings and building barricades during the 1905 Russian Revolution he was arrested by the police and remained in prison until the issuance of the October Manifesto on 17 October 1905.

Between 1905 and 1908 he earned a living by giving private lessons and completed the secondary school curriculum as an external student. In 1908–1914 he studied at the medical faculty of the University of Berlin. He took part in Zionist activities and spoke at the 10th Zionist Congress in Basel in 1911. After returning to Russia in 1914, he served as a senior resident physician in a military hospital until 1917. From 1922 he taught at the Moscow medical technical school "Medsantrud", and in 1925–1932 worked as a gynecologist in Moscow clinics. In 1934 he became an attending physician of the district trade-union organization of the Moscow–Kazan Railway.

In 1925–1926 he was a member of the legal branch of HeHalutz. He was arrested on 28 September 1934 on suspicion of committing crimes under Articles 58-10 and 58-11 of the RSFSR Criminal Code.

From 1933 he was one of the leaders of the “United Merkaz of Zionist Organizations in the USSR” and a member of the Central Committee of the Labour Zionist Party of the Soviet Union. Together with his associates he produced the underground bulletin Al ha-Mishmar (“On Guard”), personally translating materials from Hebrew newspapers published in the British Mandate of Palestine. He organized financial assistance to arrested and exiled Zionists and authored the memorandum on the situation of Jews in the USSR intended for Zionist organizations in Palestine. On 15 February 1935 he was sentenced by the Special Council of the NKVD to five years in a corrective labor camp for participation in an anti-Soviet organization.

He served his sentence in Siblag, where he was arrested again on 3 March 1938 in the case of the “Russian All-Military Union” and sentenced to death. He was executed in Biysk on 4 April 1938.

His grandson is Israeli politician and Knesset member Yuri Shtern.
