= 2001 Mongolian presidential election =

- 20 May 2001

Majority of the popular vote needed to prevent a run-off
- Registered: 1,205,885
- Turnout: 82.94% (▼2.12pp)
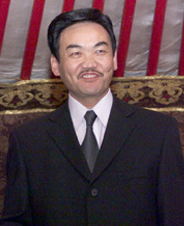
Nominee	Natsagiin Bagabandi	Radnaasümbereliin Gonchigdorj
Party	MPRP	Democratic
Popular vote	581,381	365,363
Percentage	59.19%	37.18%
- Results by province
President before election
Natsagiin Bagabandi
MPRP
Elected President
Natsagiin Bagabandi
MPRP

Presidential elections were held in Mongolia on 20 May 2001. The result was a victory for incumbent Natsagiin Bagabandi, who received 59% of the vote. Voter turnout was 83%.

== Candidates ==
Names	Born	Last position	Party
Natsagiin Bagabandi	22 April 1950 (51); Yaruu, Zavkhan, Mongolia	Incumbent President of Mongolia (1997–2005); Chairman of the MPP (1997); Chairman of the State Great Khural (1992–1996)	Mongolian People's Revolutionary Party
Radnaasümbereliin Gonchigdorj	29 December 1953 (47); Tsakhir, Arkhangai, Mongolia	Chairman of the State Great Khural (1996–2000); Vice President of the MPR (1990–1992)	Democratic Party of Mongolia
Luvsandambyn Dashnyam	1943 (58); Tüvshrüülekh, Arkhangai, Mongolia	Deputy Chairman of the People's Great Khural (1990–1992)	Civil Will Party

== Results ==
Candidate	Party	Votes	%
Natsagiin Bagabandi	Mongolian People's Revolutionary Party	581,381	59.16
Radnaasümbereliin Gonchigdorj	Democratic Party	365,363	37.18
Luvsandambyn Dashnyam	Civil Will Party	35,425	3.60
Blank votes		545	0.06
Total		982,714	100.00
Valid votes		982,714	98.26
Invalid votes		17,411	1.74
Total votes		1,000,125	100.00
Registered voters/turnout		1,205,885	82.94
Source: General Election Commission
