= Baljinnyam Bayarsaikhan =

Mongolian politician

Bayarsaikhan Baljinnyam
- Балжиннямын Баярсайхан
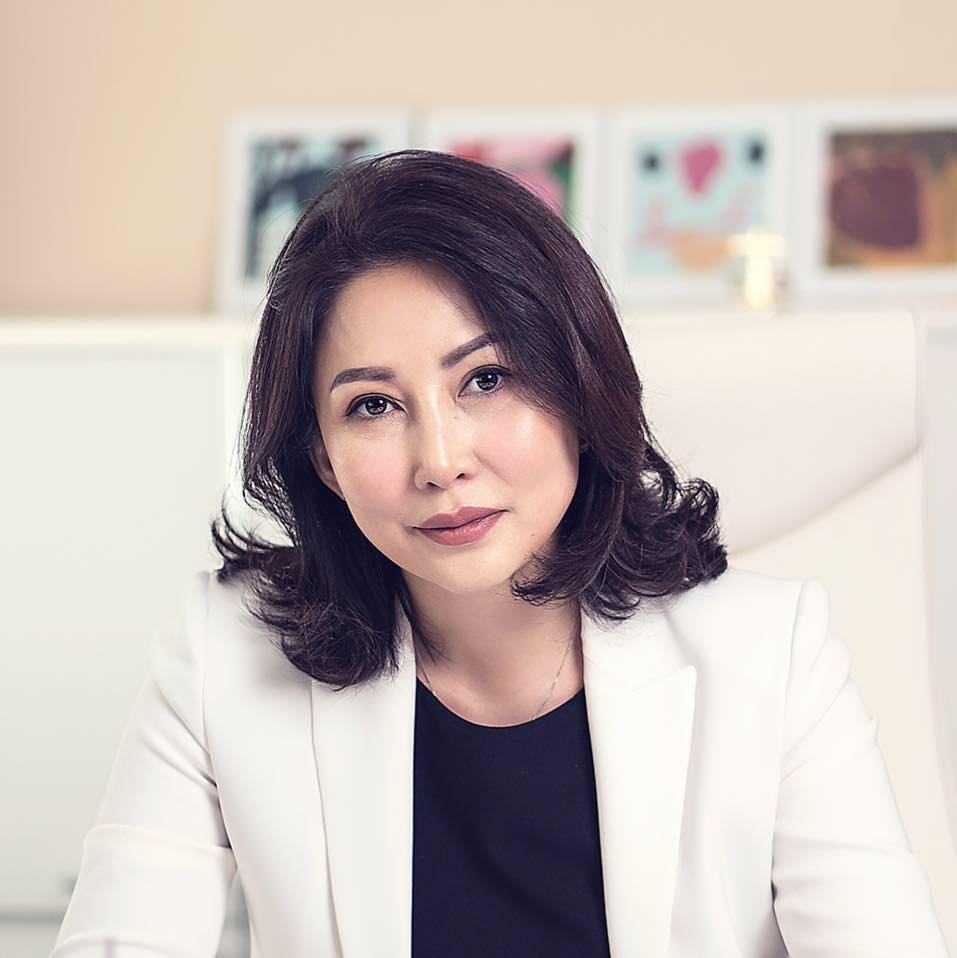

Director General of the General Authority for Child and Family Development and Protection
- Incumbent
- Assumed office February 2025

Personal details
- Party: Mongolian People's Party
- Profession: Lawyer, Journalist, Politician

Baljinnyam Bayarsaikhan (Mongolian: Балжиннямын Баярсайхан) is a Mongolian politician, lawyer, and journalist. She served as a member of the State Great Khural (Parliament of Mongolia) from 2020 to 2024, representing the Mongolian People's Party. Since February 2025, she has served as Director General of the General Authority for Child and Family Development and Protection (Mongolian: Хүүхэд, Гэр Бүлийн Хөгжил, Хамгааллын Ерөнхий Газар).

== Early life and education ==
Bayarsaikhan attended Secondary School No. 51 in Ulaanbaatar, graduating in 1987. She studied music education at the Pedagogical College until 1991. She subsequently earned a law degree from the School of Law at the National University of Mongolia in 1998, and a journalism qualification from the Press Institute of Mongolia in 1999. She also undertook studies in the United States at Wesley Law School's Asian Judicial Institute in 2001 and at the National University in Washington in 2002. In 2004, she completed a Master's degree in Social Science at the National Academy of Governance of Mongolia.

== Career ==
=== Media and communications ===
From 1995 to 1997, Bayarsaikhan worked as a presenter and editor on the morning programme at Mongolian National Television. She then served as spokesperson for the Supreme Court of Mongolia from 1997 to 2002. She subsequently worked as PR manager at MCS Group and later became Executive Director of Eagle Television, a position she held from 2007 to 2015.

=== Government service and politics ===
In 2015, Bayarsaikhan became President of the International Association of Press Clubs. From 2016 to 2020, she served as State Secretary of the Ministry of Education, Culture, Science and Sports of Mongolia. She also served as Chair of the Parliament's Standing Committee on Education, Culture, Science and Sports during her parliamentary term.

=== Parliamentary career (2020–2024) ===
Bayarsaikhan was elected to the State Great Khural in the 2020 Mongolian parliamentary election, representing constituency No. 9 under the Mongolian People's Party. During her time in parliament, she led a working group tasked with monitoring the implementation of the Law on the Rights of the Child and the Law on Child Protection, and examining the activities of child protection organisations.

=== Director General (2025–present) ===
On 21 February 2025, Bayarsaikhan was formally handed the duties of Director General of the General Authority for Child and Family Development and Protection by a working group led by State Secretary of the Ministry of Family, Labour and Social Protection L.Munkhzul.
