= Natsagiin Bagabandi =

2nd President of Mongolia from 1997 to 2005

- Нацагийн Багабанди
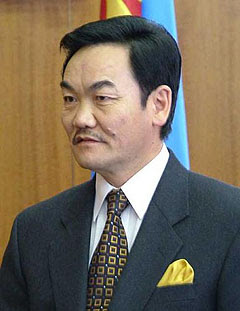
- Bagabandi in c. 2005

President of Mongolia
- In office 20 June 1997 – 24 June 2005
- Prime Minister: Mendsaikhany Enkhsaikhan; Tsakhiagiin Elbegdorj; Janlavyn Narantsatsralt; Rinchinnyamyn Amarjargal; Nambaryn Enkhbayar
- Preceded by: Punsalmaagiin Ochirbat
- Succeeded by: Nambaryn Enkhbayar

Chairman of the Mongolian People's Revolutionary Party
- In office 7 February 1997 – 6 June 1997
- Preceded by: Nambaryn Enkhbayar
- Succeeded by: Nambaryn Enkhbayar

Chairman of the State Great Khural
- In office July 1992 – July 1996
- Preceded by: Radnaasümbereliin Gonchigdorj (as chairman of the Little Khural)
- Succeeded by: Radnaasümbereliin Gonchigdorj

Personal details
- Born: 22 April 1950 (age 76) Yaruu, Zavkhan, Mongolia
- Party: Mongolian People's Party (since 1979)
- Spouse: Azadsurengiin Oyunbileg
- Children: 2
- Education: Leningrad Technological Institute of Refrigeration, Odessa Technological Institute of Food Industry, Academy of Social Sciences under the CPSU Central Committee

Natsagiin Bagabandi (Mongolian: Нацагийн Багабанди; born 22 April 1950) is a Mongolian politician who served as the second President of Mongolia from 1997 to 2005. He became the first Mongolian president to serve two consecutive terms, being elected first in 1997 and again in 2001. Prior to running for president, he served as the first Chairman of the State Great Khural (speaker), the second-highest government post, from 1992 to 1996, when his party was voted out of power. In February 1997, Bagabandi was elected the Chairman of the Mongolian People's Revolutionary Party (MPRP), the former communist ruling party. He also served as the MPRP minority floor leader in the State Great Khural alongside party chairmanship.

Following his election as president in May 1997, his party roles were assumed by Nambaryn Enkhbayar, who later secured Bagabandi's vacant seat within that year. Bagabandi's presidency was marked by his clashes and cohabitation with the legislature, controlled by the governing Democratic Union Coalition. His presidential vetoes were unable to be dismissed by the legislature because of lacking coalition seats and impasse by the opposition MPRP. Consequently, during his first tenure as president, he presided over four different governments from 1997 to 2000. The MPRP won the legislative elections in 2000 and nominated then party chair Nambaryn Enkhbayar as prime minister. Bagabandi, re-running from the MPRP, won a second term as president in the 2001 presidential election. He served as president until he was succeeded by former prime minister Enkhbayar in 2005.

He was the first person to be the director of Oyu Tolgoi LLC, serving from 2010 to 2013 and then again from 2016 to 2023.

== Early life and education ==
Bagabandi was born on 22 April 1950 in Yaruu district of Zavkhan Province, located in western Mongolia, as the fifth child of a herder family. He completed his secondary education at the 10-year secondary school of Uliastai, the provincial capital in 1968. Bagabandi graduated the Leningrad Technological Institute of Refrigeration in 1972, afterward briefly working as a repair mechanic and engineer at Ulaanbaatar distillery and brewery from 1972 to 1975. He later studied at the Odessa Technological Institute of Food Industry in the Ukrainian SSR, graduating in 1980.

In 1979, at the age of 29, he joined the Mongolian People's Revolutionary Party (MPRP), the ruling party of the Mongolian People's Republic. Bagabandi served as the head of the ideological department in Töv Province MPRP committee from 1980 to 1984. He resumed his studies inMoscow at the Academy of Social Sciences under the Central Committee of the CPSU from 1984 to 1987. Upon graduation, he received a doctorate in Philosophy. Between 1987 and 1990, he served in various lower party ranks of the party's Central Committee.

== Political career ==
In the 1992 parliamentary election, Bagabandi was elected a member to the newly established legislature, the State Great Khural, and subsequently became its chairman (speaker). He served in the state's second-highest position (after the president) for four years until 1996 when his party was defeated by the opposition Democratic Union Coalition (DUC). The DUC won 50 of the total 76 seats while the MPRP secured 25 seats.

In February 1997, Bagabandi became Chairman of the MPRP at the 22nd Party Congress, which were held in the aftermath of the party's defeat to the Democratic Union Coalition.

Bagabandi went on to successfully run as the MPRP candidate in the 1997 presidential election with 62.5% of the vote, defeating his predecessor Punsalmaagiin Ochirbat who received 30.7% of the vote. Consequently, he became the second President of Mongolia and the first president from the MPRP.

President-elect Bagabandi, considered an old guard member, was relieved from his party duties and succeeded by secretary general Nambaryn Enkhbayar as chairman of the MPRP in June 1997. His vacant parliamentary seat was won by party chairman Enkhbayar on 20 August 1997 during a by-election at the 21st constituency in Zavkhan.

== Presidency (1997–2005) ==
=== Unstable governance ===
In his first four-year term, president Bagabandi overlooked a total of four different cabinets led by four prime ministers from the Democratic Union. Government crises and political instability occurred mainly due to cohabitation and parliamentary manuevers.

In April 1998, incumbent prime minister Mendsaikhany Enkhsaikhan, serving since July 1996, resigned due to pressure from coalition leaders. He was succeeded by MNDP and coalition chairman Tsaikhiagiin Elbegdorj who was elected by parliament in favour better "coordination between the cabinet and legislature." Elbegdorj's tenure, however, was cut short in July 1998, when the opposition MPRP and coalition partner MSDP passed a no confidence vote after weeks of parliamentary impasse. Following his resignation, a political crisis occurred when nominations for Elbegdorj's successor were repeatedly vetoed by the president, whose veto required at least 51 seats to be dismissed by parliament. Without an extra seat, multiple candidates nominated by the governing coalition were rejected by Bagabandi on the premise of "inexperience and lack of qualification." Bagabandi's interpretation of the constitutional process of nominating the prime minister was somewhat controversial, and has been described by some analysts as efforts to increase presidentialism in the semi-presidential system.

In August 1998, the DUC nominated Davaadorjiin Ganbold six times but was rejected by president Bagabandi who instead proposed Dogsomyn Ganbold. Sitting foreign minister Rinchinnyamyn Amarjargal was nominated and accepted by the DUC and Bagabandi, but was voted down (35-36) by the State Great Khural in September. In the following months, nominations of Davaadorjiin Ganbold (seventh time), Galsanpuntsagiin Gankhuyag (three times) and Erdeniin Bat-Üül (single) were wrangled by Bagabandi, who later presented a list of six candidates preferred by him.

During the ensuing crisis, pro-democratic figure, lawmaker, and cabinet minister, Sanjaasürengiin Zorig, was murdered at his home on 2 October 1998. His nomination was agreed by coalition leaders prior to his murder and was allegedly supported by Bagabandi. The case became the first and only major political assassination (officially considered a homicide) to occur in democratic Mongolia. Elbegdorj remained as caretaker, longer than his actual tenure as premier, until the nomination of Janlavyn Narantsatsralt, endorsed by Bagabandi, was put forward in December 1998. Narantsatsralt resigned in July 1999 following a political backlash from a letter to Russia regarding Erdenet Mining Corporation. He was succeeded by Rinchinnyamyn Amarjargal, who served as prime minister for a year until the 2000 parliamentary elections.

Indian President K. R. Narayanan and first lady Usha Narayanan receiving Bagabandi and his spouse Azadsurengiin Oyunbileg in New Delhi, 3 January 2001

The MPRP secured an overwhelming supermajority in the elections with 72 seats. MPRP leader Nambaryn Enkhbayar was nominated by the MPRP-controlled parliament but was subject to a week-long delay by Bagabandi who insisted for the legality of constitutional amendments passed in 1999. A compromise was reached that subjected the amendments for further debate. Nambaryn Enkhbayar was appointed on 26 July 2000. The 1999 amendments restricting presidential interference in selection of head of governments was re-adopted by the MPRP majority in 2000 and later ratified in April 2001 by Bagabandi and the Constitutional Court, both of which initially opposed. Clashes between the prime minister and the president coincided with party politics between conservative and progressive wings (largely played by generational divide) in the MPRP.

Bagabandi ran for another presidential term in the 2001 presidential election. He won his re-election with 59% of the ballot in the three-way race, becoming the first Mongolian president to secure a second term. He defeated Radnaasümbereliin Gonchigdorj, the main opposition candidate, by a margin of 12%. Unlike previous prime ministers, Enkhbayar served a full four-year term and was later elected the succeeding president in the 2005 presidential election with 54.17% of the vote.

=== Foreign policy ===
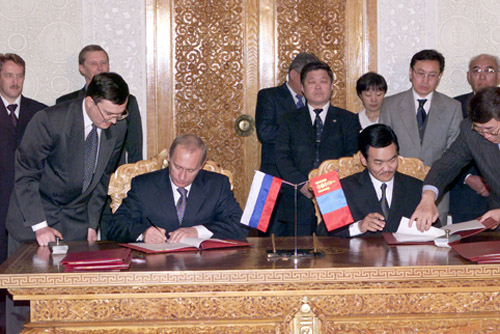
Bagabandi and Russian President Vladimir Putin signing the Ulan Bator Declaration, during Putin's first visit to Mongolia in November 2000

On 13 November 2000, Russian President Vladimir Putin made a historic visit to Mongolia at the invitation of President Bagabandi, which re-strengthened the bilateral relations between the two countries. The visit became the first visit made by a Russian head of state since Leonid Brezhnev in 1974. Price of Russian fuel exports to Mongolia was lowered and bilateral economic cooperation was expanded following the signing of the Ulan Bator Declaration on 14 November 2000.

On 29 September 2003, President Bagabandi made an address to the 58th Session of the United Nations General Assembly. In his speech, he supported the reforms in the UN and establishment of nuclear-weapon-free zones in the Korean Peninsula.

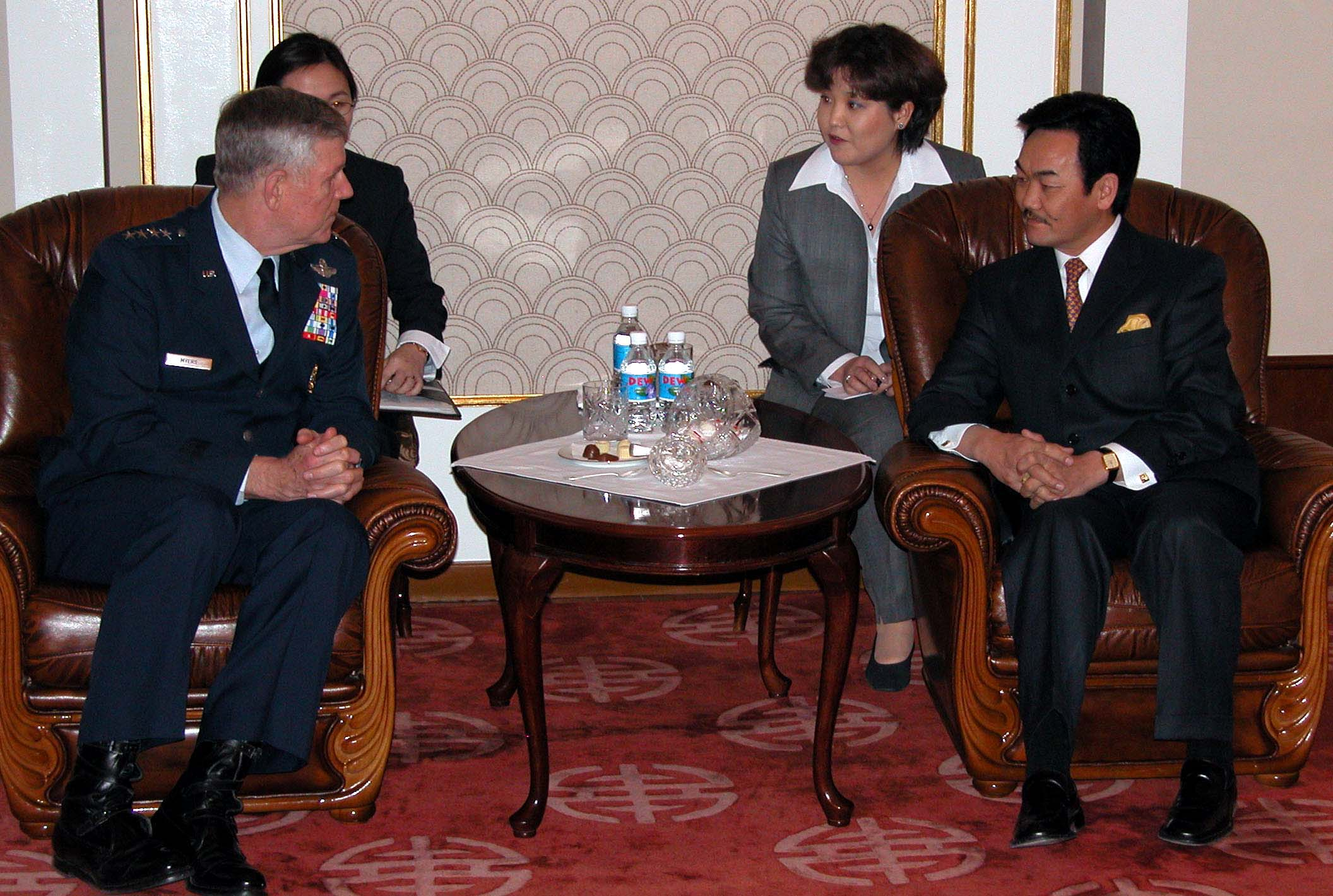
President Bagabandi with Chairman of the Joint Chiefs of Staff and U.S. General Richard Myers at the Government Palace, 13 January 2004

During a period of remarkable developments in the relationship between the United States and Mongolia, various visits and meetings between the two sides were made during Bagabandi's presidency. One such notable visit was on 15 July 2004 when Bagabandi made a key visit to the United States at the invitation of then U.S. President George W. Bush. During his visit, the two sides discussed about a range of bilateral issues from combatting global terrorism to promoting democracy and expanding trade and economic cooperation. He also visited the Pentagon and was greeted by Chairman of the Joint Chiefs of Staff General Richard B. Myers, who visited Ulaanbaatar prior in January.

==== Peacekeeping missions ====
During Bagabandi's presidency, Mongolia took extensive steps in developing its peacekeeping capabilities, a major component of modern Mongolian foreign policy. By the decree from the president who is also the commander-in-chief, the 150th Battalion, established in 1997, was chosen for the preparation of peacekeeping missions.

In the aftermath of the 9/11 attacks, Mongolia became one of the 48 countries in support for the US-led "Coalition of the willing" in the US invasion of Iraq in 2003 and showed remarkable commitments in peacekeeping despite its small size. The deployment, peaking at 180 soldiers, became the first active deployment made by the Mongolian Armed Forces in the 21st century.

== Personal life ==
He is married to Azadsurengiin Oyunbileg and is the father of two children.

After the end of his presidential term, Bagabandi became a low-profile figure in politics and published several volume of books about meditation and philosophy, called "Crown Words" (Mongolian: Титэм Үгс, romanized: Titem Ügs).

== Awards and honors ==
Country or Institution	Award	Date
Mongolia	Order of Genghis Khan	13 July 2011
Mongolia	Order of Sukhbaatar	13 September 2006
Hungary	Grand Cross of the Hungarian Order of Merit	2005
Russia	Order of Friendship	19 April 2000
Mongolian People's Republic	Medal "70 Years of the Mongolian People's Revolution"	1991

=== Honorary degrees ===
Country	School	Degree	Date
USA	Indiana University Bloomington	Honorary Doctorate	2005
Mongolia	National Academy of Governance	Honorary Doctorate	1999
Japan	Senshu University	Honorary Doctorate	1998
Turkey	Ankara University	Honorary Doctorate	1998
Kazakhstan	Abai Kazakh National Pedagogical University	Honorary Doctorate	1998
Ukraine	Odesa National Academy of Food Technologies	Honorary Doctorate	1995

== Works ==
- "Address to UN General Assembly", 29 September 2003

Party political offices
Preceded by Nambaryn Enkhbayar (as Secretary General)	Chairman of the Mongolian People's Revolutionary Party; 1997	Succeeded by Nambaryn Enkhbayar
Political offices
Preceded by Punsalmaagiin Ochirbat	President of Mongolia; 1997–2005	Succeeded by Nambaryn Enkhbayar
Political offices
Preceded by Radnaasümbereliin Gonchigdorj (as Chairman of the Little Khural)	Chairman of the State Great Khural; 1997–2005	Succeeded by Radnaasümbereliin Gonchigdorj
