= Dogsomyn Ganbold =

Mongolian politician

Dogsomyn Ganbold (Mongolian: Догсомын Ганболд) was a member of the Mongolian Parliament who was unsuccessfully put forward by President Natsagiin Bagabandi as a possible Prime Minister in opposition to Davaadorjiin Ganbold in the summer of 1998. Eventually the Democratic Alliance managed to convince President Bagabandi to approve their new candidate Rinchinnyamyn Amarjargal as Prime Minister.

== Sources ==
- Nizam U. Ahmed and Philip Norton. Parliaments of Asia. p. 156.
