= Radnaasümbereliin Gonchigdorj =

Mongolian politician

- Раднаасүмбэрэлийн Гончигдорж
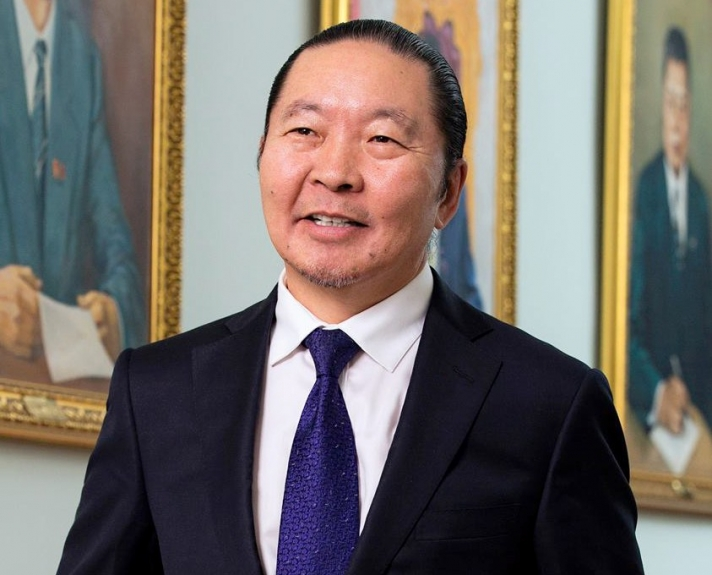
- Gonchigdorj in 2021

Vice President of the Mongolian People's Republic
- In office 13 September 1990 – 29 July 1992
- President: Punsalmaagiin Ochirbat
- Preceded by: Position created
- Succeeded by: Position abolished

Chairman of the State Great Khural
- In office July 1996 – July 2000
- President: Punsalmaagiin Ochirbat; Natsagiin Bagabandi
- Preceded by: Natsagiin Bagabandi
- Succeeded by: Lhamsürem Enebish

Chairman of the Mongolian Social Democratic Party
- In office 1994–2000
- Preceded by: Bat-Erdeniin Batbayar
- Succeeded by: Adiyagiin Ganbaatar

Chairman of the Democratic Party
- In office 2005 – October 2006
- Preceded by: Mendsaikhany Enkhsaikhan
- Succeeded by: Tsakhiagiin Elbegdorj

Deputy Chairman of the State Great Khural
- In office 10 May 2013 – 5 June 2016
- Preceded by: Gavaa Batkhuu
- Succeeded by: Tsendiin Nyamdorj

Member of the State Great Khural
- In office 1992 – 5 June 2016

Personal details
- Born: December 29, 1953 (age 72) Tsakhir, Arkhangai, Mongolia
- Party: Democratic Party (2000–present); Mongolian Social Democratic Party (1992–2000)
- Awards: Order of Chinggis Khaan

Radnaasümbereliin Gonchigdorj (Mongolian: Раднаасүмбэрэлийн Гончигдорж; born 29 December 1953) is a Mongolian politician who served as the Chairman of the State Little Khural and Vice President of the Mongolian People's Republic from 1990 to 1992 and Chairman of the State Great Khural from 1996 to 2000. He was a prominent member of the Mongolian Social Democratic Party and served as its party chairman from 1994 to 2000, prior to the party's merger into the Democratic Party.

== Early life and career ==
Born in Tsakhir, Arkhangai Province, he attended a secondary school in Tariat, and matriculated at National University of Mongolia and earned science degree from Novosibirsk University of the former Soviet Union.

He worked as a university lecturer for 13 years. Between 1988 and 1990, he was director at the Mathematical Institute of Science Academy of Mongolia. Between September 1990 and July 1992, he was elected as the Chairman of the State Little Khural, and also served as the Vice President of the Mongolian People's Republic . The new constitution abolished both the office of Vice President and the Little Khural in February 1992. Subsequently, an unicameral State Great Khural was established. Following the 1996 elections, he served as the Chairman of the State Great Khural from July 1996 to July 2000.

He is the academician of Mongolian Science Academy and received honorary doctorate degree from Korean Incheon National University and National Academy of Governance of Mongolia. In 2010, he received the Order of Chinggis Khaan, the highest state decoration of Mongolia.
