= Odesa National Academy of Food Technologies =

Public university in Odesa, Ukraine

Odesa National University of Technologies
- Одеський національний технологічний університет
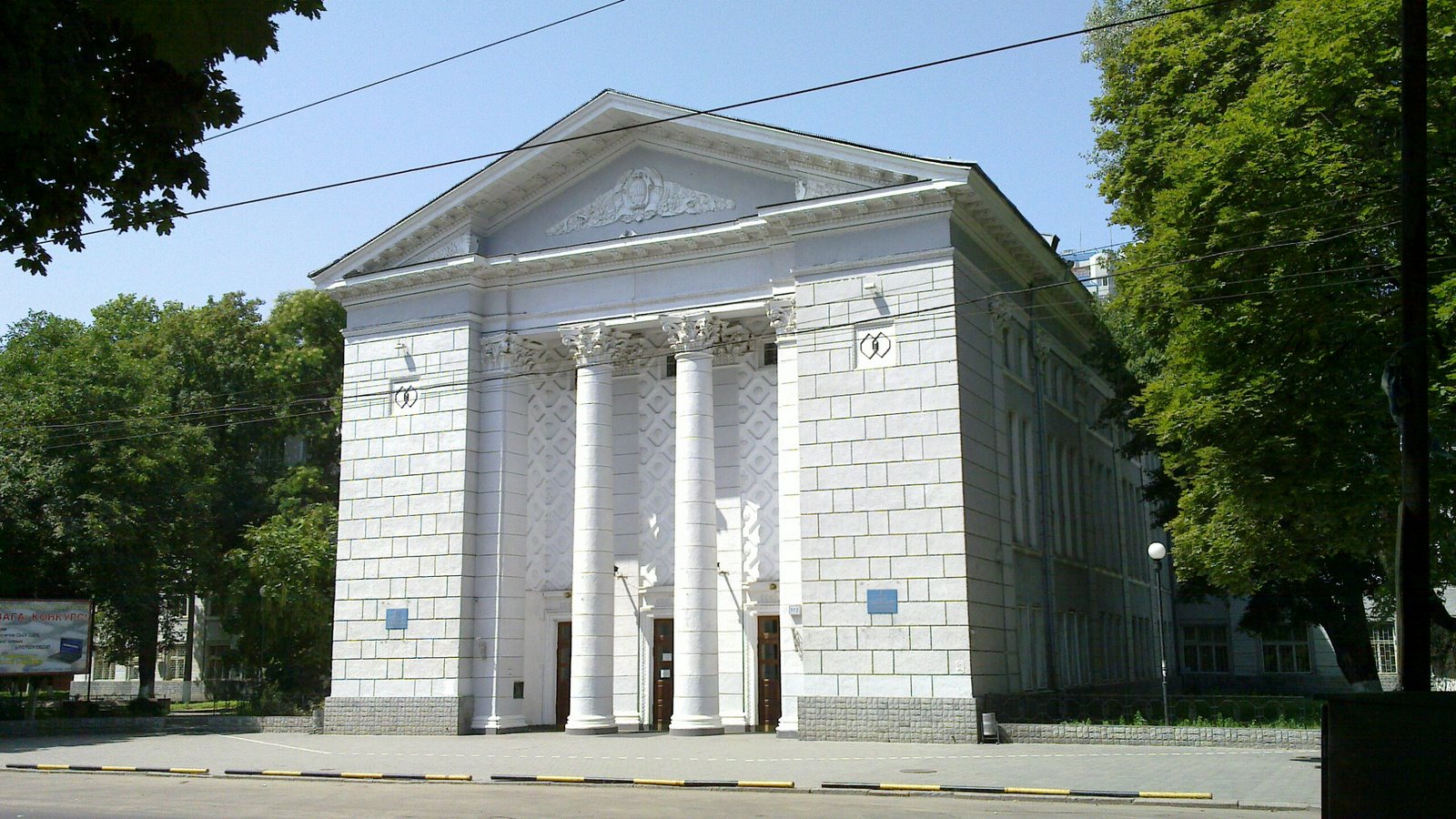
- Motto: Optimum engineering traditionem quia 1902 anno
- Established: 1902
- Affiliations: Ministry of Education and Science of Ukraine
- Rector: Ivanchenkova Larysa
- Students: 15000
- Location: Odesa, Ukraine
- Website: ontu.edu.ua

The Odesa National University of Technology (ONTU) is a public university with the highest level of accreditation established in 1902. ONTU is a multi-profile higher education institution which includes 4 scientific-educational institutions and 11 faculties and research institutes with 15 scientific schools. ONTU has about 6500 students in 21 areas of training, 42 training programs, 10 doctorate and 3 post-doctorate programs, and 4 specialized scientific councils for doctorate and post-doctorate theses defenses. Educational and research activities of ONTU provides 104 doctors/professors and 388 PhD/associate professors.

ONTU cooperates with 50 institutions from more than 20 countries worldwide, as well as with numerous national and international companies in scientific and training fields. It is a member of several international associations, including the European Universities Association, Eurasian Universities Union, Black Sea Universities Network, International Council for Open and Distance Education, the Observatory Magna Charta Universitatum, and others.

Before 2021, the university was named the Odesa National Academy of Food Technologies. By order of the Ministry of Education and Science of Ukraine No.918 of August 18, 2021, the Odesa National Academy of Food Technologies was reorganized into the Odesa National University of Technology.

University's printed journal

Ministry of Justice of Ukraine: Certificate of state registration of the print media series KB No.14344-3315P dated 04.08.2008

The founders of the publication are the Institute of Market Problems and Economic and Environmental Research of the National Academy of Sciences of Ukraine and Odesa National Technological University.

== See also ==
List of universities in Ukraine
