= State Great Khural =

Unicameral legislature of Mongolia

State Great Khural Улсын Их Хурал ᠤᠯᠤᠰ ᠤᠨ ᠶᠡᠬᠡ ᠬᠤᠷᠠᠯ
- 9th legislature

Type
- Type: Unicameral

History
- Founded: 20 July 1992; 34 years ago
- Preceded by: People's Great Khural; State Little Khural

Leadership
- Chairman: Sandagiin Byambatsogt, MPP since 3 April 2026
- Deputy Chairs: Bökhchuluuny Pürevdorj, DP; Jadambyn Bat-Erdene, MPP

Structure
- Seats: 126
- Political groups: Government (79): MPP (68); HUN (7); National Coalition (4); Opposition (47): Democratic (42); Civil Will–Green (4); Independent (1)
- Length of term: 4 years; renewable
- Salary: ₮5,700,000 monthly

Elections
- Voting system: Parallel voting: 78 seats by multiple non-transferable vote; 48 seats by closed list PR with 4% electoral threshold for individual parties, 5% for two-party coalition and 7% for coalitions of three or more parties
- First election: 28 June 1992
- Last election: 28 June 2024
- Next election: By June 2028

Meeting place
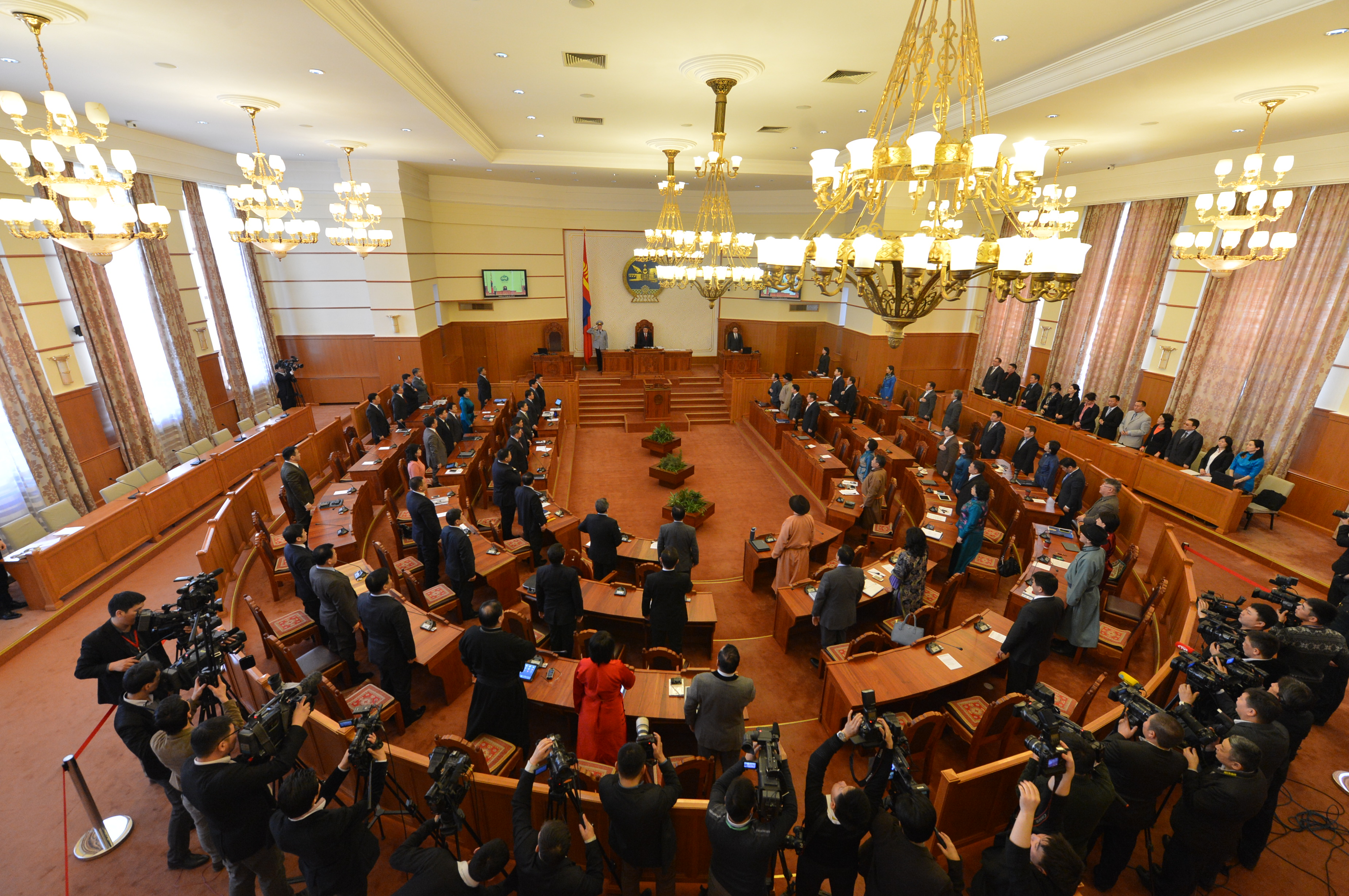
- Main Conference Room; Government Palace, Sükhbaatar Square, Sükhbaatar District, Ulaanbaatar

Website
- parliament.mn

The State Great Khural (Note: Mongolian: Улсын Их Хурал, romanized: Ulsiin Ikh Khural, IPA: [ʊɮˈsiɴ ix ˈχʊrăɮ]; lit. 'Great State Assembly') is the unicameral parliament of Mongolia, located in the Government Palace in the capital Ulaanbaatar. Elections to the State Great Khural are held every four years, the latest election was held in June 2024.

The State Great Khural currently consists of 126 seats, 78 of which were elected by multiple non-transferable vote in multi-member constituencies whilst the other 48 were elected by closed list proportional representation. Prior to the 2023 constitutional amendment, the State Great Khural was made up of 76 seats, all elected by plurality block voting.

After the ratification of the 1992 Constitution, which abolished the bicameral People's Great Khural and the State Little Khural, a unicameral parliament was established and first convened on 20 July 1992.

== History ==
=== 1914–1919 ===
Prince and khan Tögs-Ochiryn Namnansüren became the chairman of the State Great Khural in February 1914, and served until his death in April 1919.

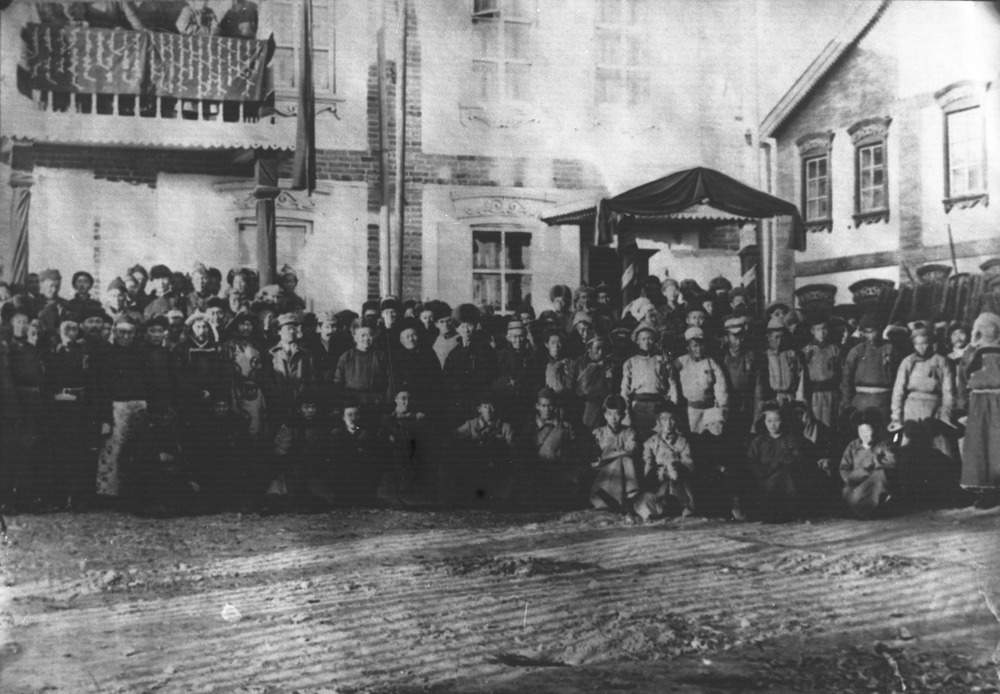
The first session of the State Great Khural in 1924

=== 1924–1960 ===
The first State Great Khural was called to session in November 1924. This body was the legislature of the Mongolian People's Republic. It delegated much of its powers to an executive committee—the Little Khural. The Great Khural held nine sessions between November 1924 and February 1949. Following electoral reforms in 1951, the numbering of its sessions began again. The first was held in July 1951 and the third in July 1957.

=== 1960–1992 ===
In 1960, a new constitution was adopted and the body was renamed the "People's Great Khural", (Note: Mongolian: Ардын Их Хурал, romanized: Ardiin Ikh Khural) but the sessions were not renumbered. The fourth took place in July 1960 and the last in September 1992. In Russian and Mongolian historiography, the term "People's Great Khural" is frequently extended back to refer to the 1924–60 Khural to distinguish it from the post-1992 State Great Khural.

==== Democratic transition ====
In the aftermath of the 1990 Democratic Revolution, the first free, democratic and multi-party election in Mongolia was held in July 1990. Subsequently, the newly elected parliament amended the Constitution of the Mongolian People's Republic, established the State Baga Khural which replaced the People's Great Khural as the highest legislative body, effectively making the People's Great Khural a representative upper house and the State Baga Khural a legislative lower house.

The State Little Khural was established with a composition of 50 members and 5 standing committees. The Mongolian People's Revolutionary Party (33), The Mongolian Democratic Party (13), The Mongolian Social Democratic Party (4), The Mongolian National Progress Party (3) won seats in the parliament proportionally to the party vote in the 1990 elections. Radnaasümbereliyn Gonchigdorj (MSDP) was elected the Little Khural's first chairman and Byaraagiin Chimed (MPRP) the first Chairman of the Secretariat.

From 1990 to 1992, the Little Khural adopted 27 new laws, ratified 17 international treaties and conventions as well as made amendments to 19 laws.

After a new constitution was ratified on 13 January 1992, the Little Khural was dissolved and a new unicameral parliament called the State Great Khural was established.

=== 1992–1996 ===
The 1st State Great Khural had 10 standing committees (reduced to 6 in 1995). In the 1992 parliamentary elections, the Mongolian People's Revolutionary Party (70), the Democratic Union Coalition of the Mongolian Democratic Party, the Mongolian National Progress Party and the Green Party (4), the Mongolian Social Democratic Party (1) and one independent politician won seats. The elected chairman was Natsagiin Bagabandi (MPRP), and the Chairman of the Secretariat was Namsrain Rechnindorj (MPRP).

The 1st State Great Khural adopted 137 laws, made amendments to 142 laws, and repealed 46 laws. The parliament also ratified 40 international treaties and conventions during its term.

=== 1996–2000 ===
The 2nd State Great Khural had 5 standing committees in 1996–1997. This increased to 7 standing committees in 1997–2000. The Democratic Union Coalition (50), The Mongolian People's Revolutionary Party (25), The Mongolian Conservative United Party (1) won seats in the parliament. The elected chairman was Radnaasümbereliyn Gonchigdorj (for the second time), and the Chairman of the Secretariat was Logiin Tsog until 1999. The next Chairman of the Secretariat was Baasanganobyn Enebish.

The 2nd State Great Khural adopted 173 new laws, made amendments to 255 laws and repealed 32 laws. The parliament also ratified 71 international treaties and conventions.

=== 2000–2004 ===
The 3rd State Great Khural had 7 standing committees. The Mongolian People's Revolutionary Party (72), The Democratic Union Coalition (1), The Civil Will Party – The Mongolian Green Party (1), The Motherland – The Mongolian Democratic New Socialist Party (1), one independent won a seat in the parliament. The elected chairman was Lhamsürem Enebish till 2001, and the Chairman of the Secretariat was Baasanganobo Enebish till 2001. The next chairman was Sanjbegz Tömör-Ochir, and the next Chairman of the Secretariat was Dagdankhuu Batbaatar until 2003. The third and final Chairman of the Secretariat during this term was Namsraijav Luvsanjav.

The 3rd State Great Khural adopted 140 new laws, made amendments to 443 laws, and repealed 51 laws. The parliament also ratified 110 international treaties and conventions.

=== 2004–2008 ===
The 4th State Great Khural had 11 standing committees as well as 8 subcommittees from 2004 to 2006. The number of standing committees was reduced to 7 in 2006. The Mongolian People's Revolutionary Party (37), the Motherland and Democracy Union (35), The Republican Party (1) and 3 independents won seats in the parliament. The elected chairman was Nambaryn Enkhbayar (MPRP) until 2005, and the Chairman of the Secretariat continued to be Namsraijaviin Luvsanjav (MPRP). The next chairman was Tsendiin Nyamdorj (MPRP) until 2007. The third and final chairman during this term was Danzangiin Lundeejantsan (MPRP).

The fourth State Great Khural adopted 89 new laws, made amendments to 336 laws. The parliament also ratified 38 international treaties and conventions as well as repealed 50 laws.

=== 2008–2012 ===
The 5th State Great Khural had 7 standing committees and 11 subcommittees. The Mongolian People's Revolutionary Party (46), The Democratic Party (27), The Civil Will Party (1) 8 The Green Party (1) and 1 independent won the seats in the parliament. For 5 months (May to September, 2008), Danzangiin Sandang-Ochir was the Chairman of the Secretariat. The elected chairman was Damdiny Demberel (MPRP), and the second Chairman of the Secretariat was Tserenkhuugiin Sharavdorj (MPRP).

The 5th State Great Khural adopted 111 new laws and made amendments to 485 laws. The parliament also ratified 59 international treaties and conventions as well as repealed 70 laws.

=== 2012–2016 ===
For the first time, the 2012 parliamentary election was held using a mixed electoral system, which combined plurality block voting and proportional representation. 48 seats were elected directly from 26 multi-member constituencies and 28 seats by closed list proportional representation.

The 6th State Great Khural had 8 standing committees and 10 subcommittees. The Democratic Party (34), The Mongolian People's Party (26), The Justice Coalition of the Mongolian People's Revolutionary Party – The Mongolian National Democratic Party (11), The Civil Will–Green Party(2), and 3 independents won seats in the parliament. The elected chairman was Zandaakhuugiin Enkhbold (DP), and the Chairman of the Secretariat was Byambadorjiin Boldbaatar (DP).

Also for the first time in Mongolia, electronic voting machines were used for voter registration, vote counting and monitoring purposes.

=== 2016–2020 ===
The law on the amendments to the election law was adopted by the parliament in May 2016 and as a result, the 2016 election was held under a first-past-the-post system in 76 single-mandate constituencies.

The 7th State Great Khural on its first plenary session approved the composition of standing committees which maintained the previous parliamentary structure of 8 standing committees and 10 subcommittees. The Mongolian People's Party (65), The Democratic Party (9), The Mongolian People's Revolutionary Party (1), and 1 independent won seats in the parliament. Miyeegombyn Enkhbold (MPP) was elected as chairman.

=== 2020–2024 ===
The 8th State Great Khural had 11 standing committees, 11 subcommittees, and 3 temporary committees, one of which was established due to the COVID-19 pandemic in Mongolia. The Mongolian People's Party (62), The Democratic Party (11), The Our Coalition (1), The Right Person Electorate Coalition (1) and 1 independent won seats in the parliament. Incumbent Gombojavyn Zandanshatar (MPP) was re-elected as parliamentary speaker.

=== 2024–present ===
Following a constitutional amendment made in July 2023, the number of member of parliament increased from 76 to 126. The 2024 parliamentary election was held using a parallel system, with 78 seats elected from multi-member constituencies and 48 seats elected from closed list proportional representation.

The 9th State Great Khural, the first five-party parliament convened in Mongolia, has 11 standing committees and 5 subcommittees. The Mongolian People's Party (68), The Democratic Party (42), The HUN Party (8), The National Coalition (4) and The Civil Will–Green Party (4) won seats in the parliament. Dashzegviin Amarbayasgalan (MPP) was elected as chairman and Barsurengiin Baasandorj (MPP) as Chairman of the Secretariat.

== Structure ==
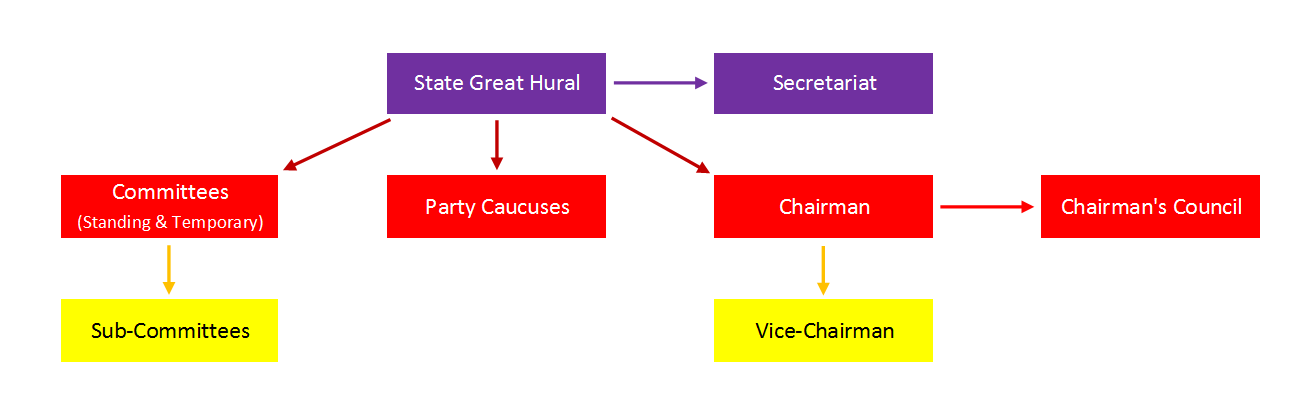
The structure of the main positions in the State Great Khural.

The State Great Khural is unicameral, and consists of 126 members. With mandate of no less than 57 of total members of the State Great Khural, the parliament shall be considered in existence of its powers. A member of the State Great Khural shall be an envoy of the people and shall represent and uphold the interests of all the citizens and the people. The mandate of a member of the State Great Khural shall begin with an oath taken before the State Emblem and expire when newly elected members of the State Great Khural are sworn in.

=== Chairman of the State Great Khural ===
The Chairman is the presiding officer of the State Great Khural.

=== Vice-Chairman of the State Great Khural ===
The vice-chairman is elected by each caucus formed by the result of an election. They serve a four-year term, but may be relieved or removed of the position, on grounds defined by law, before their term expiration.

=== Chairman's Council ===
The Chairman's Council consists of the vice-chairman of the State Great Khural, Chairmen of the party caucuses, leaders of parliamentary parties, and Chairmen of standing/temporary committees.

== Functions ==
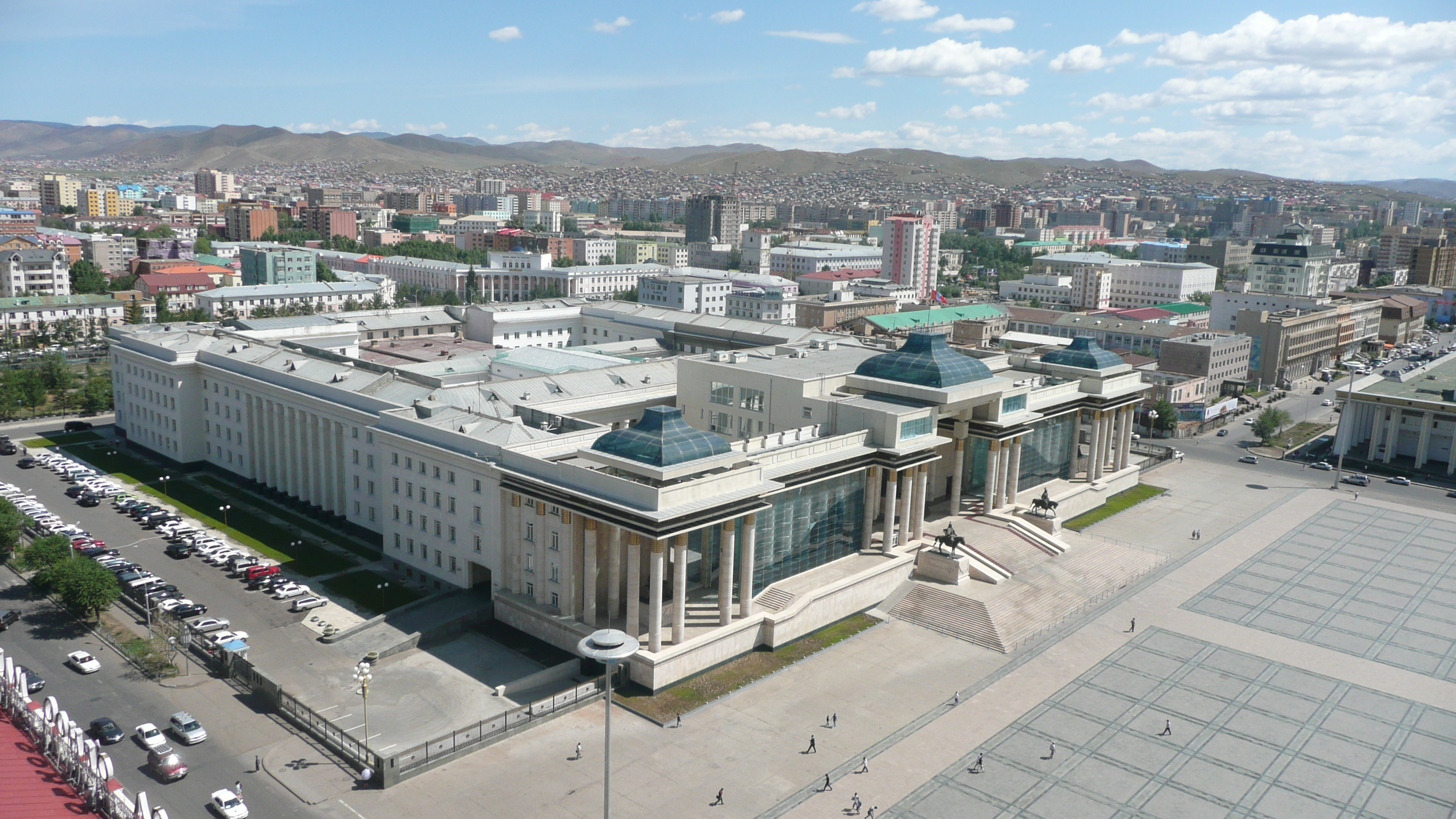
The Government Palace hosts the State Great Khural

The State Great Khural has both legislative and oversight power in Mongolia.

=== Legislative functions ===
The State Great Kural's principal legislative functions include preparing and carrying-out plenary sessions or standing-committee sittings, discussing drafts of laws or other decisions of the State Great Khural, and adopting, passing and resolving processes.

=== Oversight functions ===
The State Great Khural implements its oversight powers by:

- hearing reports, presentations and briefings from the Cabinet and other organizations directly accountable to the State Great Khural
- questioning the Prime Minister, cabinet members and executives of other organizations directly accountable to the State Great Khural, demanding responses of said enquiries, and generating debate of the responses in its sessions
- assessing the implementation of laws and other resolutions of the State Great Khural at the cabinet and other organizations directly accountable to the State Great Khural; and generating debates at the Standing-Committee sittings or if necessary at the plenary sessions
- delivering verdicts on professional or ethical offences committed by the Prime Minister, by cabinet members, by those who have been appointed by the State Great Khural, or by executives and members of other organizations directly accountable to the State Great Khural

== Elections ==
Elections are held every four years to elect all members of the State Great Khural. Before 2023, the election used plurality-at-large voting in all 26 multi-member constituencies to elect 76 members.

On 31 May 2023, the parliament approved a constitutional amendment that increased the number of seats from 76 to 126. The method of election was also changed to parallel voting with 78 seats elected by multiple non-transferable vote in 13 multi-member constituencies and 48 by closed list proportional representation at the national level with an electoral threshold of 4% for individual parties, 5% for a two-party coalition and 7% for coalitions of three or more parties. To qualify for proportional seats, parties and coalitions must also have candidates running in at least half of the seats in each constituency. Party lists must adhere to the zipper system, while the overall gender ratio of candidates for a party must not be greater than 70:30 or less than 30:70. A voter turnout of 50% is required for the result in a constituency to be considered valid, or another round of voting must be held for that constituency.

To vote, a Mongolian citizen must be 18 years or older, and live in Mongolia. Any person over 25 is eligible to be elected. New elections are held if the Khural is dissolved, if two-thirds of members vote for dissolution, if the President dissolves the Khural, or if the President or half the Cabinet resigns.

== Sessions ==
The main organizational form of the State Great Khural is the session. According to the Article 27 of the Constitution, regular sessions of the State Great Khural convene in every six months for not less than 50 working days. Session consists of plenary sessions, exclusive or joint Standing Committee sittings and caucus meetings. The four types of sessions are:

- Inauguration session – Convenes, by the President's convocation, within 30 days after the election.
- Regular session – Autumn session commences on 1 October, and the spring session commences on 5 April each year.
- Extra ordinary session – Convenes at the demand of greater than one third of the members of the State Great Khural, or on the initiative of either the President or the Chairman of the State Great Khural.
- Emergency session – Convenes within 72 hours of the President's proclamation of state of emergency or war.

=== Committees ===
The State Great Khural shall have standing committees dealing with specific fields of public policy. The Standing committees are composed of 10–19 members and shall be convened on Tuesday and Wednesday each week. The subcommittee is affiliated with and deals with specific issues within the standing committee. The State Great Khural shall set up temporary committees for reviewing specific issues, making proposals and submitting reports to the plenary sessions.

=== Party caucuses ===
A coalition with 8 or more seats must establish a party caucus. Independents and members of several parties may choose to join a caucus, but may not establish their own. Each caucus must elect a leader, which is then reported to the chairman. The decision to establish a caucus, along with its membership roster, must be submitted within 24 hours of the Chairman's election. The Chairman will then announce these decisions at the plenary session of the State Great Khural.

=== List of term compositions ===
supermajority majority plurality/coalition largest minority

Election	Composition (at commencement)	Speaker	Prime Minister	Opposition Leader	MPRP MPP	MDP DUC DP	Third parties	Independent
1990	(State Little Khural); 13:6:31 (People's Great Khural); 23:63:343	Radnaasümbereliin Gonchigdorj	Dashiin Byambasüren (MPRP)	Erdeniin Bat-Üül (MDP)	L(31); G(343)	L(13); G(23)	L(6); G(12)	L(-); G(51)
1992	4:2:70	Natsagiin Bagabandi	Puntsagiin Jasrai (MPRP)	Erdeniin Bat-Üül (1992); Davaadorjiin Ganbold (1992-96); Tsakhiagiin Elbegdorj (1996) (MDP→MNDP)	70	4	1	1
1996	50:1:25	Radnaasümbereliin Gonchigdorj	Mendsaikhany Enkhsaikhan (1996-98); Tsakhiagiin Elbegdorj (1998); Janlavyn Narantsatsralt (1998-99); Nyam-Osoryn Tuyaa (1999); Rinchinnyamyn Amarjargal (1999-00) (DUC)	Nambaryn Enkhbayar (1996-97); Natsagiin Bagabandi (1997); Nambaryn Enkhbayar (1997-00) (MPRP)	25	50	1	-
2000	1:3:72	Lhamsurengiin Enebish (2000-01); Sanjbegziin Tumur-Ochir (2001-04)	Nambaryn Enkhbayar (MPRP)	Rinchinnyamyn Amarjargal (2000); Tsakhiagiin Elbegdorj (2000-2002); Mendsaikhany Enkhsaikhan (2002-2004) (DP)	72	1	2	1
2004	35:4:37	Nambaryn Enkhbayar (2004-05); Tsendiin Nyamdorj (2005-07); Danzangiin Lundeejantsan (2007-08)	Tsakhiagiin Elbegdorj (2004-06) (DP); Miyeegombyn Enkhbold (2006-07); Sanjaagiin Bayar (2007-08) (MPRP)	—N/a	37	35	1	3
2008	28:3:45	Damdiny Demberel	Sanjaagiin Bayar (2008-09); Sükhbaataryn Batbold (2009-12) (MPRP→MPP)	Tsakhiagiin Elbegdorj (2008); Norovyn Altankhuyag (2008-12) (DP)	45	28	2	1
2012	33:16:27	Zandaakhüügiin Enkhbold	Norovyn Altankhuyag (2012-14); Dendeviin Terbishdagva (2014) (MPRP); Chimediin Saikhanbileg (2014-16) (DP)	Ölziisaikhany Enkhtüvshin (2012-13); Miyeegombyn Enkhbold (2013-16) (MPP)	27	33	13	3
2016	9:2:65	Miyeegombyn Enkhbold (2016-19); Gombojavyn Zandanshatar (2019-20)	Jargaltulgyn Erdenebat (2016-17); Ukhnaagiin Khürelsükh (2017-20) (MPP)	Sodnomzunduin Erdene (DP)	65	9	1	1
2020	11:3:62	Gombojavyn Zandanshatar	Ukhnaagiin Khürelsükh (2020-21); Luvsannamsrain Oyun-Erdene (2021-24) (MPP)	Sodnomzunduin Erdene (DP)	62	11	2	1
2024	42:16:68	Dashzegviin Amarbayasgalan (2024-25); Nyam-Osoryn Uchral (2025-26); Sandagiin Byambatsogt (2026-Present)	Luvsannamsrain Oyun-Erdene (2024-25); Gombojavyn Zandanshatar (2025-26); Nyam-Osoryn Uchral (2026-Present) (MPP)	Luvsannyamyn Gantömör (2023-25); Odongiin Tsogtgerel (2025-Present) (DP)	68	42	16	0

== Legislation ==
=== Stage 1 ===
The party caucuses or standing committees shall make draft legislation and decide whether to submit it for discussion at the plenary sessions of the State Great Khural. The State Great Khural will then decide whether to discuss the draft legislation. If they decide to discuss it, it shall send the drafts to standing committees to prepare for the first discussion. If they decide not to discuss legislation drafts, then it shall be sent back to its initiators.

=== Stage 2 ===
The standing committee shall prepare a legislation draft for the first discussion and shall submit its proposal and conclusion to the State Great Khural. At this stage, party groups are allowed to make comments about the draft. Opinions and proposals of all parties shall be included in the standing committee conclusions. After the voting at the plenary session, drafts shall be sent back to the standing committees for the preparation of the final discussion.

=== Stage 3 ===
The standing committees shall include conclusions from the first discussion to the original draft and shall make presentations about the first discussion. They shall also make the introduction of a draft to the State Great Khural. At this stage, the standing committees are allowed to request a re-voting regarding the draft. The draft shall be discussed, voted and fully adopted by the State Great Khural. If the draft is not fully adopted, it shall be sent back to the law initiators.

The standing committees shall prepare the final versions of the legislation drafts and other resolutions of the State Great Khural. The standing committees shall make the introduction of the final versions of the legislation and other resolutions to the State Great Khural. After the introduction of the final versions of the legislations and other resolutions at the State Great Khural, the Chairman of the State Great Khural shall sign the final versions within three working days. The signed legislations and other resolutions of the State Great shall be submitted to the President of Mongolia within 24 hours. If the president vetoes the legislations, the issue shall be discussed again at the State Great Khural. The legislation shall be considered valid after the publication of the legislations in the 'State Information' bulletin.

== Latest election ==
Preliminary results showed the ruling Mongolia People's Party had won a narrow and reduced majority in the Khural, which allowed Prime Minister Luvsannamsrain Oyun-Erdene to publicly claim victory. The Democratic Party also gained 42 seats, an increase from the 2020 election. The full official results were presented by the GEC on 1 July 2024.

Party	Proportional			Constituency			Total seats	+/–
Party	Votes	%	Seats	Votes	%	Seats	Total seats	+/–
Mongolian People's Party	509,482	35.01	18	3,619,950	38.64	50	68	+6
Democratic Party	438,506	30.13	16	3,135,988	33.48	26	42	+31
HUN Party	151,111	10.38	6	636,648	6.80	2	8	+7
National Coalition	75,196	5.17	4	291,166	3.11	0	4	New
Civil Will–Green Party	73,006	5.02	4	269,582	2.88	0	4	+4
New United Coalition	69,682	4.79	0	255,847	2.73	0	0	New
Truth and Right Party	40,783	2.80	0	208,717	2.23	0	0	New
Civil Movement Party	20,443	1.40	0	153,615	1.64	0	0	New
Republican Party	19,635	1.35	0	116,561	1.24	0	0	New
The Civic Unity Party	13,733	0.94	0	86,083	0.92	0	0	New
People's Power Party	10,614	0.73	0	106,423	1.14	0	0	New
Good Democratic Citizens United Party	6,104	0.42	0	59,902	0.64	0	0	New
Motherland Party	5,621	0.39	0	52,803	0.56	0	0	New
Liberte Party	4,738	0.33	0	45,794	0.49	0	0	New
People's Majority Governance Party	3,619	0.25	0	31,025	0.33	0	0	0
For the Mongolian People Party	3,461	0.24	0	35,183	0.38	0	0	New
Mongolian Liberal Democratic Party	2,820	0.19	0	232	0.00	0	0	New
United Patriots Party	2,168	0.15	0	213	0.00	0	0	0
Mongolian Social Democratic Party	1,531	0.11	0	7,789	0.08	0	0	0
Mongol Conservative Party	1,485	0.10	0	21,177	0.23	0	0	New
Freedom Implementing Party	1,450	0.10	0	26,192	0.28	0	0	0
Independent				206,916	2.21	0	0	–1
Total	1,455,188	100.00	48	9,367,806	100.00	78	126	+50
Valid votes	1,455,188	99.47		1,441,825	99.33			
Invalid/blank votes	7,717	0.53		9,728	0.67			
Total votes	1,462,905	100.00		1,451,553	100.00			
Registered voters/turnout	2,094,733	69.84		2,097,961	69.19			
Source: General Election Commission

=== Results by constituency ===
Results by constituency

1st Constituency
Candidate	Party	Votes	%
Oyuunsaikhany Altangerel	Democratic Party	66,656	5.80
Sainkhüügiin Ganbaatar	Democratic Party	61,824	5.38
Batmönkhiin Battsetseg	Mongolian People's Party	60,610	5.27
Pürevbaataryn Mönkhtulga	Democratic Party	60,059	5.23
Dashdondogiin Ganbat	Democratic Party	58,263	5.07
Ganzorigiin Temüülen	Mongolian People's Party	58,228	5.07
Ganbatyn Khosbayar	Democratic Party	56,612	4.93
Damdinsürengiin Jargalsaikhan	Democratic Party	56,177	4.89
Davaagiin Tsogtbaatar	Democratic Party	55,935	4.87
Gombojavyn Zandanshatar	Mongolian People's Party	53,649	4.67
Amgalangiin Ad'yaasüren	Democratic Party	53,485	4.65
Dulamdorjiin Togtokhsüren	Mongolian People's Party	51,867	4.51
Batsuuriin Davaadalai	Mongolian People's Party	51,686	4.50
Sodnomyn Chinzorig	Mongolian People's Party	51,248	4.46
Enebishiin Bolorchuluun	Democratic Party	50,935	4.43
Gürsediin Saikhanbayar	Mongolian People's Party	49,296	4.29
Gochoogiin Ganbold	Mongolian People's Party	48,964	4.26
Ayuushiin Tsogtsetseg	Mongolian People's Party	48,661	4.23
Ayuurzanyn Otgonbaatar	Truth and Right Party	23,876	2.08
Tserendorjiin Dagvadorj	National Coalition	10,025	0.87
Otgonbaataryn Bilgüün	HUN Party	9,724	0.85
Tsolmongiin Mönkhbat	Independent	7,955	0.69
Erdene-Ochiryn Sodnomjamts	National Coalition	7,760	0.68
Sharav-Arildiigiin Mönkhbaatar	Truth and Right Party	4,493	0.39
Rentsendorjiin Oyuunbileg	National Coalition	3,966	0.35
Dagdangiin Odontungalag	National Coalition	3,726	0.32
Mönkhtogtokhyn Galmönkh	Truth and Right Party	3,609	0.31
Batsürengiin Urangoo	HUN Party	3,290	0.29
Perenlein Tamir	HUN Party	3,033	0.26
Gombodorjiin Enkh-Amgalan	Civil Movement Party	2,943	0.26
Ünenbuyangiin Gantig	HUN Party	2,770	0.24
Byambaakhüügiin Oyuunbileg	Truth and Right Party	2,726	0.24
Tömör-Ochiryn Mönkhnasan	New United Coalition	2,721	0.24
Dashkhüügiin Batmandakh	HUN Party	2,519	0.22
Baasansambuugiin Chinbaatar	New United Coalition	2,474	0.22
Jambalsürengiin Batzangia	Truth and Right Party	2,447	0.21
Tömör-Ochiryn Bulganmaa	HUN Party	2,403	0.21
Gankhuyagiin Odontsetseg	Truth and Right Party	2,305	0.20
Enkhbaataryn Mönkhtulga	Motherland Party	2,249	0.20
Nergüin Tüvshinmönkh	Civil Movement Party	2,123	0.18
Sosorbaramyn Ganbold	Civil Will–Green Party	2,062	0.18
Dolgorsürengiin Erdenebat	Truth and Right Party	2,002	0.17
Byambaagiin Buyanjargal	Civil Movement Party	1,990	0.17
Sükhbaataryn Bütemj	Civil Movement Party	1,896	0.16
Pürevragchaagiin Battulga	Civil Movement Party	1,854	0.16
Erdenebatyn Gan-Erdene	Civil Will–Green Party	1,839	0.16
Gend-Ochiryn Khayankhyarvaa	Civil Movement Party	1,798	0.16
Chagnaadorjiin Pürevsüren	Truth and Right Party	1,783	0.16
Chuluuntsetsegiin Gereltuyaa	Truth and Right Party	1,769	0.15
Ganbaataryn Bütemj	HUN Party	1,725	0.15
Chogsomyn Mönkh-Amgalan	HUN Party	1,693	0.15
Ölziipüreviin Shinekhüü	Civil Movement Party	1,672	0.15
Sosoryn Enkhbat	Civil Will–Green Party	1,641	0.14
Enkhtöriin Pagamjam	Civil Will–Green Party	1,590	0.14
Tsanjidyn Baldandorj	New United Coalition	1,522	0.13
Üdelmaagiin Erdenechimeg	Civil Will–Green Party	1,473	0.13
Ganpüreviin Dolgormaa	HUN Party	1,352	0.12
Dashzevegiin Bayarmaa	Civil Will–Green Party	1,238	0.11
Zinamideriin Bat-Erdene	People's Majority Rule Party	1,114	0.10
Batchuluuny Uranchimeg	People's Power Party	990	0.09
Bat-Ayuushiin Dugarmaa	Civil Will–Green Party	963	0.08
Nyam-Ochiryn Nasanbaatar	Motherland Party	935	0.08
Gombosürengiin Düürenbileg	Republican Party	933	0.08
Davaabayaryn Nyambayar	Motherland Party	911	0.08
Tüvshintöriin Tüvshinjargal	Citizen Participation Union Party	905	0.08
Erdenebatyn Enkhbat	For the Mongolian People Party	862	0.07
Myagmardorjiin Batmönkh	Republican Party	824	0.07
Dembereldalain Tsegmed	Mongolian Conservative Party	718	0.06
Myagmarpüreviin Osorjamaa	Citizen Participation Union Party	713	0.06
Dashbazaryn Otgontsetseg	Freedom Alliance Party	705	0.06
Batmönkhiin Oyuun-Erdene	For the Mongolian People Party	635	0.06
Üüriintuyaagiin Amarjargal	People's Power Party	584	0.05
Davkharbayaryn Khurtsbaatar	Freedom Alliance Party	566	0.05
Shinedentseliin Altansükh	For the Mongolian People Party	477	0.04
Mijiddorjiin Battulga	Good Democratic Citizens United Party	460	0.04
Batbayaryn Ankhbayar	Freedom Alliance Party	456	0.04
Banzaryn Javzmaa	Good Democratic Citizens United Party	415	0.04
Pürevjambyn Sanchir	Citizen Participation Union Party	373	0.03
Avirmediin Üürtsaikh	Good Democratic Citizens United Party	326	0.03
Tserenbaljiryn Erdenebaatar	Good Democratic Citizens United Party	280	0.02
Total		1,149,336	100.00
Valid votes		127,163	99.46
Invalid/blank votes		687	0.54
Total votes		127,850	100.00
Registered voters/turnout		187,668	68.13

2nd Constituency
Candidate	Party	Votes	%
Sandagiin Byambatsogt	Mongolian People's Party	79,826	5.66
Odongiin Tsogtgerel	Democratic Party	75,927	5.38
Dashzegviin Amarbayasgalan	Mongolian People's Party	74,199	5.26
Bökhchuluuny Pürevdorj	Democratic Party	74,152	5.26
Battogtokhyn Choijilsüren	Mongolian People's Party	73,280	5.20
Banzragchiin Tüvshin	Democratic Party	69,829	4.95
Ochirbatyn Amgalanbaatar	Democratic Party	67,597	4.79
Batjargalyn Zayaabal	Mongolian People's Party	67,321	4.77
Zagdjavyn Mendsaikhan	Mongolian People's Party	66,594	4.72
Enkhbatyn Bolormaa	Mongolian People's Party	64,838	4.60
Tsedendambyn Tserenpuntsag	Mongolian People's Party	64,537	4.58
Zagdkhüügiin Narantuyaa	Democratic Party	59,284	4.20
Shirnenbanidyn Adishaa	Democratic Party	58,823	4.17
Baljinnyamyn Bayarsaikhan	Mongolian People's Party	58,788	4.17
Chimediin Khürelbaatar	Mongolian People's Party	56,388	4.00
Sereejavyn Enkhbold	Mongolian People's Party	55,107	3.91
Tsogtoogiin Odontungalag	Democratic Party	51,204	3.63
Daimaagiin Batsaikhan	Democratic Party	50,612	3.59
Dogsomyn Battsogt	Democratic Party	50,096	3.55
Norovyn Tegshbayar	Democratic Party	38,629	2.74
Samandyn Javkhlan	Republican Party	18,883	1.34
Ad'yaabaljiryn Sanjmyatav	Independent	6,071	0.43
Dorjiin Önörjargal	HUN Party	5,568	0.39
Khiimorsangiin Bolor-Erdene	HUN Party	5,109	0.36
Khumbagaryn Batmend	New United Coalition	4,357	0.31
Tseren-Ochiryn Batdorj	National Coalition	4,325	0.31
Ganbatyn Bayarmaa	HUN Party	4,153	0.29
Damdiny Buyanbal	HUN Party	3,892	0.28
Nyamaagiin Tseveen	National Coalition	3,374	0.24
Ganboldyn Bayartogtokh	Civil Will–Green Party	3,322	0.24
Jarantain Amartaivan	New United Coalition	2,822	0.20
Sorogiin Soyombo	HUN Party	2,737	0.19
Doljingiin Otgonbayar	Civil Will–Green Party	2,594	0.18
Battulgyn Enkhzayaa	HUN Party	2,447	0.17
Altangereliin Dorjdagva	Truth and Right Party	2,445	0.17
Davaatserengiin Avirmed	National Coalition	2,443	0.17
Baljinnyamyn Amaraa	HUN Party	2,282	0.16
Khadbaataryn Naranzayaa	Civil Will–Green Party	2,196	0.16
Ochirbatyn Altansükh	Civil Movement Party	2,042	0.14
Gantulgyn Khiimorisan	Independent	1,957	0.14
Jambaldorjiin Otgonbayar	New United Coalition	1,916	0.14
Chimidiin Mönkhjargal	New United Coalition	1,825	0.13
Dashravdangiin Altansükh	Civil Movement Party	1,802	0.13
Tüvshindüürenbayaryn Tsolmonsaikhan	New United Coalition	1,795	0.13
Dorjpalamyn Mönkhbayar	Independent	1,765	0.13
Tsogoogiin Möngöntulga	Civil Will–Green Party	1,722	0.12
Baryn Batsuuri	Civil Will–Green Party	1,674	0.12
Magsarjavyn Byambadorj	Republican Party	1,624	0.12
Batnasangiin Battogtokh	Truth and Right Party	1,597	0.11
Batsaikhany Khash-Erdene	HUN Party	1,531	0.11
Chimeddorjiin Yerööltüvshin	People's Majority Rule Party	1,512	0.11
Narantsetsegiin Davaanyam	National Coalition	1,494	0.11
Gankhuyagiin Budnyam	Truth and Right Party	1,465	0.10
Namjiljavyn Sandag	Civil Movement Party	1,461	0.10
Myangandashiin Byambadorj	HUN Party	1,461	0.10
Tsengeliin Bat-Erdene	Independent	1,459	0.10
Batsaikhany Mönkhtsetseg	Freedom Implementing Party	1,454	0.10
Tulgaagiin Galbadrakh	Republican Party	1,432	0.10
Oyuunbaataryn Nyamdorj	Truth and Right Party	1,427	0.10
Davaanyamyn Batzorigt	Civil Movement Party	1,372	0.10
Choijilsürengiin Bat-Erdene	Republican Party	1,303	0.09
Jamsrangiin Tserenchimed	Civil Movement Party	1,218	0.09
Erdenebaataryn Ganbold	Civil Movement Party	1,148	0.08
Dorjiin Chingeel Baatar	Civil Movement Party	1,121	0.08
Jamsranjavyn Mönkhbayar	Motherland Party	1,088	0.08
Shartolgoin Odkhüü	Civil Movement Party	1,067	0.08
Darisürengiin Tsogjargal	Motherland Party	1,049	0.07
Gantulgyn Enkhbayar	Independent	1,031	0.07
Tserenpiliin Odgerel	Civil Movement Party	1,004	0.07
Gombosürengiin Sarantuyaa	Truth and Right Party	991	0.07
Lkhagvajavyn Ganzorig	Independent	989	0.07
Ganboldyn Pürevragchaa	Independent	942	0.07
Ganbaataryn Namjilmaa	Truth and Right Party	902	0.06
Buyanjargalyn Lkhagvasüren	Independent	895	0.06
Batmönkhiin Tögsbayar	Freedom Implementing Party	890	0.06
Bayarsaikhany Pürevsüren	Truth and Right Party	888	0.06
Pürveegiin Ganbold	Independent	879	0.06
Tömöriin Batsükh	Truth and Right Party	826	0.06
Batkholboogiin Nyamdolgor	Citizen Participation Union Party	825	0.06
Tulgaagiin Ariuntungalag	Good Democratic Citizens United Party	818	0.06
Sharavyn Erdenetsetseg	People's Power Party	817	0.06
Tsedendambyn Batlkhagva	Civil Will–Green Party	781	0.06
Banzragchiin Byambadorj	Civil Movement Party	774	0.05
Enkh-Amgalangiin Baljinnyam	Freedom Alliance Party	727	0.05
Choijiljavyn Binder'yaa	Truth and Right Party	721	0.05
Jamsranchimediin Batsaikhan	Independent	704	0.05
Ideshiin Tungalagtuyaa	For the Mongolian People Party	699	0.05
Garmaagiin Erdenebat	People's Power Party	684	0.05
Dügersürengiin Enkhbayar	Independent	683	0.05
Battömöriin Batbayar	Independent	670	0.05
Dorjiin Möngöntsetseg	Good Democratic Citizens United Party	661	0.05
Naranbaataryn Choijildagva	Motherland Party	655	0.05
Badamdorjiin Baasankhüü	Independent	643	0.05
Baasandorjiin Bileg	Freedom Implementing Party	638	0.05
Lkhagvasürengiin Tömörsükh	Citizen Participation Union Party	626	0.04
Vanchigiin Tömörbaatar	Mongolian Conservative Party	604	0.04
Zambyn Batmönkh	Independent	580	0.04
Tulgaagiin Ankhbayar	Freedom Alliance Party	576	0.04
Ganjuuryn Mönkhtsetseg	Citizen Participation Union Party	554	0.04
Mandakhyn Enkhmörön	Freedom Alliance Party	505	0.04
Dalantain Bayanjargal	Truth and Right Party	501	0.04
Sanjmyatavyn Saruul-Erdene	People's Majority Rule Party	454	0.03
Sengesambyn Mönkh-Ochir	Citizen Participation Union Party	453	0.03
Yadamdorjiin Bat-Erdene	People's Majority Rule Party	451	0.03
Zandangiin Enkh-Orgil	Freedom Alliance Party	443	0.03
Tsesmaagiin Ganbat	Good Democratic Citizens United Party	423	0.03
Bayarsaikhany Anundari	Good Democratic Citizens United Party	418	0.03
Nyalkhain Oyuundalai	Citizen Participation Union Party	409	0.03
Khuvkhüü Dobkhardtyn Tümenkhishig	Mongolian Conservative Party	364	0.03
Ishdorjiin Davaadulam	For the Mongolian People Party	356	0.03
Batnasangiin Mönkh-Altai	Good Democratic Citizens United Party	351	0.02
Myagmaryn Nyamgerel	Good Democratic Citizens United Party	350	0.02
Javjingiin Nyamdorj	People's Majority Rule Party	272	0.02
Bazarjavyn Davaadorj	Good Democratic Citizens United Party	201	0.01
Total		1,410,460	100.00
Valid votes		140,704	99.71
Invalid/blank votes		403	0.29
Total votes		141,107	100.00
Registered voters/turnout		192,200	73.42

3rd Constituency
Candidate	Party	Votes	%
Khajyekbyeriin Jangabyl	Mongolian People's Party	25,138	18.14
Tilyeukhany Aubakir	Mongolian People's Party	23,772	17.15
Bulany Byeisyen	Democratic Party	21,454	15.48
Sharivyn Jandos	Democratic Party	18,160	13.10
Khuzkyeigiin Darmyen	Democratic Party	17,518	12.64
Zulpain Batyrbyek	Mongolian People's Party	16,986	12.26
Dalyeliin Bauyrjan	Independent	8,880	6.41
Birdkhany Mukhit	HUN Party	1,161	0.84
Battulgyn Enkh-Uyanga	Truth and Right Party	1,154	0.83
Kabiliin Yerjan	National Coalition	1,036	0.75
Tsonkhiogiin Tsolmon	HUN Party	665	0.48
Tursyny Güljan	Civil Will–Green Party	362	0.26
Khalimjany Bagdat	Civil Will–Green Party	317	0.23
Nasiryn Samat	New United Coalition	317	0.23
Zakhany Daulyetbyek	New United Coalition	285	0.21
Khajymuratyn Nurgül	Civil Will–Green Party	245	0.18
Natsagdorjiin Enkhbaatar	Civil Movement Party	240	0.17
Batdelgeriin Zagdzüsem	Civil Movement Party	231	0.17
Boldbaataryn Naranbadral	Civil Movement Party	225	0.16
Marjany Bolat	HUN Party	133	0.10
Pürevjavyn Erdenetsogt	Good Democratic Citizens United Party	114	0.08
Mavlyetyn Tölyegyen	Republican Party	110	0.08
Shökyeshiin Asylbyek	Freedom Alliance Party	79	0.06
Total		138,582	100.00
Valid votes		46,080	99.63
Invalid/blank votes		171	0.37
Total votes		46,251	100.00
Registered voters/turnout		62,896	73.54

4th Constituency
Candidate	Party	Votes	%
Khaltmaagiin Battulga	Democratic Party	60,933	5.92
Luvsantserengiin Enkh-Amgalan	Mongolian People's Party	59,728	5.80
Dambyn Batlut	Mongolian People's Party	58,657	5.70
Bat-Ölziin Bat-Erdene	Mongolian People's Party	53,474	5.20
Dorjsürengiin Üüriintuyaa	Mongolian People's Party	51,805	5.03
Lkhagvyn Mönkhbaatar	Mongolian People's Party	49,182	4.78
Jadambyn Bat-Erdene	Mongolian People's Party	48,198	4.68
Tserenpiliin Davaasüren	Mongolian People's Party	47,557	4.62
Batbayaryn Ariun-Erdene	Democratic Party	43,885	4.26
Lamjavyn Gündalai	People's Power Party	42,919	4.17
Jalbasürengiin Batzandan	Democratic Party	42,683	4.15
Günshiriin Möngönkhuyag	Democratic Party	40,183	3.90
Khaichaagiin Batsaikhan	Democratic Party	40,162	3.90
Batsükhiin Bayarmagnai	Mongolian People's Party	39,800	3.87
Dorligiin Ösökhbayar	Democratic Party	38,449	3.74
Khash-Erdeniin Erdenebaatar	Democratic Party	37,132	3.61
Gungaajavyn Tserendolgor	Democratic Party	33,045	3.21
Erdenebilegiin Batkhishig	New United Coalition	12,066	1.17
Batchuluuny Mönkhnasan	Independent	11,046	1.07
Batmönkhiin Mönkhbold	HUN Party	9,402	0.91
Dashdavaagiin Ganbold	National Coalition	9,007	0.88
Bayaraagiin Zundui	HUN Party	8,669	0.84
Shinebayaryn Zulbadam	Independent	8,531	0.83
Enkh-Amgalangiin Sarantsetseg	National Coalition	8,026	0.78
Ganzorigiin Gankhuyag	New United Coalition	7,671	0.75
Tömörbaataryn Ochirdari	HUN Party	7,284	0.71
Bavuugiin Chinzorig	National Coalition	7,070	0.69
Ganbaataryn Batbaatar	Truth and Right Party	6,627	0.64
Erdenetögsiin Enkhchimeg	HUN Party	6,074	0.59
Munadembereliin Sambuunyam	People's Power Party	5,542	0.54
Biraagiin Bat-Erdene	Civil Will–Green Party	5,447	0.53
Mashiny Elbegzayaa	HUN Party	5,317	0.52
Tsogtyn Bataa	Independent	4,726	0.46
Tsagaantsoojiin Enkhbat	HUN Party	4,571	0.44
Erdenebayaryn Tungalag	HUN Party	4,477	0.44
Battulgyn Bolormaa	Truth and Right Party	4,381	0.43
Dashtserengiin Nominzayaa	People's Power Party	4,308	0.42
Dashnyamyn Batbayar	Independent	4,228	0.41
Gürjavyn Batpürev	Civil Movement Party	4,163	0.40
Bayarsaikhany Byambajav	People's Power Party	4,027	0.39
Dashbaldangiin Batbayar	New United Coalition	4,007	0.39
Batkhüügiin Batjargal	People's Power Party	3,763	0.37
Dorjiin Amartüvshin	People's Power Party	3,718	0.36
Bat-Erdeniin Ariunzayaa	People's Power Party	3,706	0.36
Balsanjavyn Batbileg	Civil Will–Green Party	3,653	0.35
Badarchiin Erdenebat	Motherland Party	3,495	0.34
Tümenbayaryn Saruultungalag	New United Coalition	3,269	0.32
Ayuulgüin Ariunbold	New United Coalition	3,240	0.31
Baldandorjiin Bat-Uul	Civil Movement Party	3,092	0.30
Nyamsürengiin Khandsüren	Civil Will–Green Party	2,953	0.29
Otgondorjiin Sanjaasüren	Truth and Right Party	2,953	0.29
Gonchigsürengiin Enkhbayar	Republican Party	2,525	0.25
Jam'yandorjiin Zolzayaa	Truth and Right Party	2,513	0.24
Püreviin Ganbat	Civil Movement Party	2,482	0.24
Namnansürengiin Serjmyatav	Civil Movement Party	2,290	0.22
Davaajavyn Batchimeg	Citizen Participation Union Party	2,143	0.21
Davaasürengiin Tsogt-Erdene	Civil Movement Party	2,117	0.21
Jamsrangiin Ider	New United Coalition	2,008	0.20
Tömörbaataryn Amraa	Civil Will–Green Party	1,939	0.19
Puntsagdorjiin Damdindorj	Civil Movement Party	1,910	0.19
Tömör-Ochiryn Ganbat	Motherland Party	1,859	0.18
Bataagiin Gantulga	Freedom Implementing Party	1,838	0.18
Setenjavyn Ürelpürev	New United Coalition	1,794	0.17
Gombosürengiin Bayanjargal	Civil Movement Party	1,790	0.17
Chogsomjavyn Enkhbold	Civil Movement Party	1,758	0.17
Tserenbatyn Jimbeegalsan	People's Power Party	1,661	0.16
Tsetsgeegiin Odonchimeg	Good Democratic Citizens United Party	1,625	0.16
Erdenebilegiin Oyuun-Erdene	Freedom Alliance Party	1,528	0.15
Davaajavyn Ölzii-Orshikh	Citizen Participation Union Party	1,399	0.14
Lkhagvyn Saranchimeg	Citizen Participation Union Party	1,281	0.12
Dagvajamtsyn Sarantuyaa	Good Democratic Citizens United Party	1,235	0.12
Rentsendorjiin Galbadrakh	For the Mongolian People Party	1,124	0.11
Byambajavyn Sükhbold	For the Mongolian People Party	1,107	0.11
Tömörbaataryn Oyuunbolor	Freedom Alliance Party	1,055	0.10
Tömöriin Erdenetsetseg	Mongolian Conservative Party	1,028	0.10
Chimiddorjiin Chimid-Ochir	Motherland Party	923	0.09
Batmönkhiin Ayuush	Citizen Participation Union Party	844	0.08
Amgalangiin Batbileg	People's Majority Rule Party	797	0.08
Giragiin Niislelkhüü	People's Majority Rule Party	796	0.08
Delgeriin Narmandakh	For the Mongolian People Party	777	0.08
Iderbatyn Biligsaikhan	Freedom Alliance Party	754	0.07
Luvsanjambaagiin Mönkhtör	Mongolian Conservative Party	745	0.07
Baldangiin Bayasgalan	Mongolian Conservative Party	675	0.07
Galbadrakhyn Altanshagai	Citizen Participation Union Party	663	0.06
Khurmashiin Baasansüren	Citizen Participation Union Party	661	0.06
Sanjaasürengiin Pürevsüren	Good Democratic Citizens United Party	562	0.05
Ganshiremiin Nordod	People's Majority Rule Party	525	0.05
Total		1,029,032	100.00
Valid votes		128,125	99.52
Invalid/blank votes		619	0.48
Total votes		128,744	100.00
Registered voters/turnout		193,183	66.64

5th Constituency
Candidate	Party	Votes	%
Boldyn Javkhlan	Mongolian People's Party	62,898	4.89
Tsevegdorjiin Tuvaan	Democratic Party	60,644	4.72
Dalain Batbayar	Democratic Party	53,903	4.19
Jadambyn Enkhbayar	Mongolian People's Party	53,306	4.15
Buyaagiin Tulga	Mongolian People's Party	50,017	3.89
Gongoryn Damdinnyam	Mongolian People's Party	49,307	3.84
Sükhbaataryn Erdenebold	Democratic Party	47,892	3.73
Sürenjavyn Lündeg	Mongolian People's Party	46,712	3.64
Chinbatyn Undram	Mongolian People's Party	44,925	3.50
Jigjidiin Batjargal	Mongolian People's Party	44,775	3.48
Batchuluuny Tsogtgerel	Mongolian People's Party	43,223	3.36
Nemekheegiin Odongua	Democratic Party	40,617	3.16
Dondogdorjiin Erdenebat	Democratic Party	40,270	3.13
Dombongiin Üüriintuyaa	Democratic Party	39,908	3.11
Deremiin Erdenesuvd	Democratic Party	39,687	3.09
Natsagdorjiin Lkhagvadorj	Mongolian People's Party	39,643	3.09
Damdinsürengiin Önörbolor	Mongolian People's Party	39,394	3.07
Dulamsürengiin Dorjpürev	Democratic Party	37,281	2.90
Radnaagiin Batjargal	Democratic Party	36,584	2.85
Lkhasürengiin Odbayar	Democratic Party	33,937	2.64
Magsarjavyn Ochirbat	HUN Party	15,209	1.18
Khashbaataryn Tsagaanbaatar	Civil Will–Green Party	14,639	1.14
Lkhagvasürengiin Bayartulga	National Coalition	12,323	0.96
Pürevdorjiin Erdenebat	New United Coalition	12,226	0.95
Ganbürgediin Gantuyaa	HUN Party	12,000	0.93
Gongoryn Otgontuyaa	HUN Party	10,351	0.81
Chuluunbatyn Tsog-Erdene	HUN Party	10,294	0.80
Otgonkhüügiin Bolor-Erdene	National Coalition	10,016	0.78
Monkhoryn Törtogtokh	Independent	9,559	0.74
Dagvadorjiin Gantuul	Independent	9,497	0.74
Batsaikhany Nyambayar	Truth and Right Party	9,316	0.72
Shoovdoryn Barkhasbadi	HUN Party	8,366	0.65
Lkhagvyn Jambaa	HUN Party	7,483	0.58
Agvaansamdangiin Batsükh	New United Coalition	7,384	0.57
Davaagiin Bayasgalan	New United Coalition	6,790	0.53
Lkhagvaagiin Oyuunchimeg	New United Coalition	6,461	0.50
Janyn Ganbaatar	Independent	6,389	0.50
Luvsangiin Ganbold	Independent	6,376	0.50
Donoloin Badamkhand	HUN Party	6,289	0.49
Dashpuntsagiin Khishigjargal	National Coalition	6,214	0.48
Baataryn Undrakh-Od	National Coalition	5,991	0.47
Lkhasürengiin Choi-Ish	National Coalition	5,948	0.46
Baastyn Erdenebolor	National Coalition	5,833	0.45
Baldangiin Ganbaatar	Civil Will–Green Party	5,683	0.44
Pürevtserengiin Undram	HUN Party	5,474	0.43
Oidovyn Tsetsegmaa	Truth and Right Party	5,407	0.42
Tovuudorjiin Nasanjargal	National Coalition	5,401	0.42
Saranbaataryn Atartsetseg	Civil Will–Green Party	5,088	0.40
Sharavyn Batkhishig	Civil Will–Green Party	4,858	0.38
Mergenbilegiin Soyol	HUN Party	4,737	0.37
Ünenbürengiin Myagmarjav	Civil Movement Party	4,621	0.36
Shaizadagiin Galam	HUN Party	4,602	0.36
Khaltaryn Boldmandal	National Coalition	4,013	0.31
Batboldyn Byambabaatar	Truth and Right Party	3,929	0.31
Rinchindorjiin Ariunsanaa	Civil Will–Green Party	3,775	0.29
Ochirbatyn Nergüi	Civil Will–Green Party	3,545	0.28
Batsaikhany Chinbat	Truth and Right Party	3,520	0.27
Tsend-Ayuushiin Mönkhjargal	Civil Will–Green Party	3,504	0.27
Tsedeviin Ölziitogtokh	Civil Movement Party	3,486	0.27
Ninagiin Soronzonbayar	Republican Party	3,445	0.27
Manakhüügiin Ganbat	Civil Movement Party	3,399	0.26
Sükhbaataryn Batbayar	Motherland Party	3,340	0.26
Lamkhüügiin Naranchimeg	Republican Party	3,298	0.26
Batsaikhany Odgerel	Truth and Right Party	3,296	0.26
Urtnasangiin Baatarkhuyag	Civil Will–Green Party	3,244	0.25
Bayanmönkhiin Baljinnyam	Motherland Party	3,223	0.25
Janchivyn Tsendsüren	Civil Movement Party	3,098	0.24
Soronzonboldyn Bolorchuluun	Civil Movement Party	3,032	0.24
Batbayaryn Davaajargal	Citizen Participation Union Party	2,934	0.23
Chimeddorjiin Erdenebat	Civil Movement Party	2,912	0.23
Balchindorjiin Enkhsaikhan	Mongolian Conservative Party	2,660	0.21
Badralyn Khorolgarav	Truth and Right Party	2,654	0.21
Radnaagiin Ulambadrakh	Civil Movement Party	2,605	0.20
Choijingiin Ganchimeg	Motherland Party	2,375	0.18
Gochoogiin Natsagdorj	Civil Movement Party	2,361	0.18
Mönkhbayaryn Amarsanaa	For the Mongolian People Party	2,234	0.17
Sandagdorjiin Soyolbaatar	Civil Movement Party	2,224	0.17
Dorjiin Damdinsüren	Freedom Implementing Party	2,016	0.16
Batboldyn Telmüün	Good Democratic Citizens United Party	1,969	0.15
Batkhüügiin Bayarchimeg	People's Power Party	1,968	0.15
Namdagiin Naranbaatar	Citizen Participation Union Party	1,915	0.15
Tsedendambyn Enkhsaikhan	Civil Movement Party	1,903	0.15
Ochirbatyn Itgelsüren	Freedom Alliance Party	1,857	0.14
Batzorigiin Uuganbayar	Freedom Alliance Party	1,844	0.14
Dembereliin Bayaraa	Motherland Party	1,807	0.14
Altankhuyagiin Möngönshagai	Motherland Party	1,778	0.14
Batkhuyagiin Anar	People's Power Party	1,773	0.14
Dulmaagiin Uuganbayar	Citizen Participation Union Party	1,713	0.13
Gantömöriin Tungalag	Citizen Participation Union Party	1,639	0.13
Banzragchiin Ganbold	Freedom Implementing Party	1,625	0.13
Darkhanbayaryn Amartüvshin	Freedom Implementing Party	1,531	0.12
Tsedengiin Enkhtuyaa	Good Democratic Citizens United Party	1,478	0.12
Bayandalain Mönkhtenger	People's Power Party	1,350	0.11
Püreviin Bold	People's Majority Rule Party	1,332	0.10
Gankhuyagiin Sarantsetseg	People's Majority Rule Party	1,242	0.10
Möngönzagasyn Erdenebat	Good Democratic Citizens United Party	1,195	0.09
Tsogtbayaryn Tungalagbolor	People's Power Party	1,180	0.09
Bayarsaikhany Tsengünjav	Freedom Alliance Party	1,102	0.09
Batchuluuny Bars	People's Power Party	1,091	0.08
Dulmaagiin Ariuntuyaa	For the Mongolian People Party	1,071	0.08
Bazargüriin Ariunbold	Good Democratic Citizens United Party	1,044	0.08
Nyamaabazaryn Mönkhtuyaa	People's Power Party	1,009	0.08
Vanchingiin Narantsetseg	For the Mongolian People Party	989	0.08
Chuluuny Iderbaatar	Freedom Implementing Party	958	0.07
Namsrain Erdenestsatsral	Citizen Participation Union Party	927	0.07
Mönkhtömöriin Ariunzayaa	People's Power Party	913	0.07
Battömöriin Baigalimaa	For the Mongolian People Party	907	0.07
Zorigtyn Batüd	Citizen Participation Union Party	900	0.07
Sükhbaataryn Javzandulam	Freedom Implementing Party	840	0.07
Enebishiin Ölziisaruul	For the Mongolian People Party	804	0.06
Pürevdalain Enkh-Amgalan	People's Majority Rule Party	787	0.06
Volodyagiin Badamkhand	People's Majority Rule Party	758	0.06
Bayartsaikhany Byambagerel	Citizen Participation Union Party	753	0.06
Bürengiin Delgerekh	For the Mongolian People Party	657	0.05
Dondogiin Dariimaa	People's Power Party	628	0.05
Denzengiin Chuluunchimeg	People's Majority Rule Party	627	0.05
Tsedengiin Sergelentuyaa	For the Mongolian People Party	493	0.04
Lkhagvadorjiin Byaraabazar	People's Power Party	412	0.03
Tsogtoogiin Tserendolgor	For the Mongolian People Party	351	0.03
Total		1,284,990	100.00
Valid votes		127,950	99.44
Invalid/blank votes		724	0.56
Total votes		128,674	100.00
Registered voters/turnout		193,635	66.45

6th Constituency
Candidate	Party	Votes	%
Luvsannamsrain Oyun-Erdene	Mongolian People's Party	55,469	8.06
Myagmarsürengiin Badamsüren	Mongolian People's Party	46,667	6.78
Tsagaankhüügiin Iderbat	Mongolian People's Party	45,777	6.65
Ukhnaagiin Otgonbayar	Mongolian People's Party	43,724	6.35
Lkhagvasürengiin Soronzonbold	Mongolian People's Party	43,400	6.30
Shinebayaryn Byambasüren	Democratic Party	43,047	6.25
Möngöntsogiin Gankhüleg	Mongolian People's Party	42,248	6.14
Erkhembaataryn Tömörbaatar	Democratic Party	41,601	6.04
Pürev-Ochiryn Anujin	Mongolian People's Party	40,443	5.87
Törmönkhiin Pürevkhatan	Democratic Party	38,915	5.65
Nayantain Ganibal	Democratic Party	37,630	5.47
Sükhbaataryn Tömörkhüü	Democratic Party	36,239	5.26
Demberelvaanchigiin Baldan	Democratic Party	28,408	4.13
Shagdaryn Batdelger	Democratic Party	27,090	3.94
Lkhamjavyn Batjav	Independent	23,562	3.42
Pürevgereliin Gerelbaatar	Independent	8,883	1.29
Chuluuny Erdenebat	National Coalition	7,831	1.14
Enkhjargalyn Undarmaa	National Coalition	6,223	0.90
Galsandorjiin Solongo	Truth and Right Party	6,080	0.88
Erdenebaataryn Zayagegee	National Coalition	4,053	0.59
Damdinsürengiin Enkhbayar	HUN Party	3,727	0.54
Törboldyn Bat-Orgil	National Coalition	3,230	0.47
Lkhagvyn Lkhagvasüren	HUN Party	2,624	0.38
Enkhtöriin Pürevsüren	Civil Will–Green Party	2,454	0.36
Arslanbaataryn Arvinjargal	HUN Party	2,356	0.34
Ochirsükhiin Odjargal	Independent	2,276	0.33
Delgermaagiin Solongo	Motherland Party	2,071	0.30
Sharavdorjiin Byambatogtokh	National Coalition	1,992	0.29
Tsedevdorjiin Choijamts	Independent	1,959	0.28
Dolgoryn Bayarbileg	HUN Party	1,781	0.26
Tömör-Ochiryn Chinbat	Civil Will–Green Party	1,678	0.24
Ryenchindorjiin Enkhtuyaa	HUN Party	1,620	0.24
Magsaryn Ariunbat	New United Coalition	1,543	0.22
Galsandorjiin Bulgan	Truth and Right Party	1,456	0.21
Mönkhjargalyn Buyanzayaa	HUN Party	1,447	0.21
Dashjamtsyn Badrakh	New United Coalition	1,353	0.20
Kholkhoryn Oyuunchimeg	Civil Movement Party	1,248	0.18
Myagmarpüreviin Önörbileg	Truth and Right Party	1,178	0.17
Damdinsürengiin Daramdorj	Civil Will–Green Party	1,136	0.17
Batmönkhiin Batbayar	New United Coalition	1,131	0.16
Enkhbayaryn Tömör	Civil Movement Party	1,126	0.16
Bat-Ölziin Ganzorig	Civil Movement Party	1,123	0.16
Jam'yany Chuluun	Civil Movement Party	1,111	0.16
Badamjavyn Bazarvaani	Truth and Right Party	1,079	0.16
Jambaljamtsyn Jargalsaikhan	Civil Movement Party	1,063	0.15
Dashdondogiin Dagvasüren	Civil Will–Green Party	961	0.14
Ichinkhorloogiin Tserenkhand	Civil Movement Party	920	0.13
Alyeksandryn Bayarsaikhan	Civil Will–Green Party	912	0.13
Ulaankhüügiin Myagmarkhüü	HUN Party	898	0.13
Gansükhiin Batkhuyag	Motherland Party	897	0.13
Ideriin Odonchimeg	Republican Party	893	0.13
Ochgereliin Baatarkhuyag	Good Democratic Citizens United Party	772	0.11
Taravyn Mönkhbat	Republican Party	768	0.11
Khoroljavyn Enkhtulga	Good Democratic Citizens United Party	727	0.11
Mashlain Otgonbayar	For the Mongolian People Party	691	0.10
Tsend-Ayuushiin Batbold	Civil Movement Party	663	0.10
Ariunbayaryn Uyanga	People's Power Party	629	0.09
Tsagaany Ganbold	For the Mongolian People Party	629	0.09
Norovsambuugiin Enkhbold	Mongolian Conservative Party	598	0.09
Gankhüügiin Khürelkhüü	Citizen Participation Union Party	593	0.09
Myagmarsürengiin Odgerel	Citizen Participation Union Party	573	0.08
Batsürlegiin Bat-Erdene	Freedom Alliance Party	553	0.08
Khürelbaataryn Chinzorig	Citizen Participation Union Party	501	0.07
Valyagiin Bat-Otgon	People's Majority Rule Party	475	0.07
Khumbaadain Chingiskhaan	People's Majority Rule Party	443	0.06
Sanjaagiin Enkhbaatar	Republican Party	442	0.06
Altangereliin Tsolmon	Freedom Alliance Party	396	0.06
Sharavyn Ganbold	People's Power Party	388	0.06
Jadambaagiin Boroldoi	People's Power Party	320	0.05
Bayasgalangiin Amartüvshin	People's Majority Rule Party	316	0.05
Mendbayaryn Ankhkhatan	People's Majority Rule Party	278	0.04
Sanjaajavyn Dagmidmaa	Republican Party	274	0.04
Sharavdüvjiriin Amarjargal	People's Majority Rule Party	248	0.04
Lkhamkhandyn Tsevegdari	Freedom Alliance Party	242	0.04
Luvsanbaldangiin Batnasan	People's Power Party	203	0.03
Batjargalyn Nyamjargal	People's Majority Rule Party	174	0.03
Total		688,429	100.00
Valid votes		97,465	98.96
Invalid/blank votes		1,029	1.04
Total votes		98,494	100.00
Registered voters/turnout		143,143	68.81

7th Constituency
Candidate	Party	Votes	%
Ryenchinbyambyn Seddorj	Democratic Party	41,428	6.59
Borkhüügiin Delgersaikhan	Mongolian People's Party	39,331	6.26
Nanzadyn Naranbaatar	Mongolian People's Party	37,134	5.91
Luvsanbyambaagiin Mönkhbayasgalan	Democratic Party	37,019	5.89
Tsagaankhüügiin Mönkhbat	Democratic Party	36,433	5.80
Ravjikhyn Erdenebüren	Democratic Party	36,179	5.76
Gombyn Ganbaatar	Democratic Party	35,629	5.67
Ölziibayaryn Zolbayar	Mongolian People's Party	35,525	5.65
Tömörtogoogiin Enkhtüvshin	Mongolian People's Party	35,486	5.65
Batsükhiin Saranchimeg	Mongolian People's Party	34,557	5.50
Nasanbuyangiin Enkhbat	Democratic Party	32,101	5.11
Gombodorjiin Batsuuri	Mongolian People's Party	29,930	4.76
Luvsandorjiin Odser	Democratic Party	29,466	4.69
Gompildoogiin Mönkhtsetseg	Mongolian People's Party	27,930	4.45
Otgony Mönkhzayaa	National Coalition	9,809	1.56
Osoryn Ganbat	New United Coalition	9,001	1.43
Altangarigiin Büddorj	Truth and Right Party	8,100	1.29
Ulaanmaamyn Erdenebayar	Independent	7,401	1.18
Tsetsegeegiin Mönkhbayar	Truth and Right Party	6,885	1.10
Baatarsürengiin Uuganbayar	Independent	5,763	0.92
Tögsiin Enkhbayar	National Coalition	5,703	0.91
Jalbuugiin Jamsrandorj	HUN Party	4,396	0.70
Agvaany Otgonbayar	HUN Party	4,274	0.68
Bataagiin Erdenebat	National Coalition	3,990	0.64
Luvsandorjiin Khishigbayar	National Coalition	3,839	0.61
Darjaagiin Bolormaa	New United Coalition	3,617	0.58
Khüükhendüügiin Sugir	Civil Movement Party	3,315	0.53
Chuluuny Urangua	HUN Party	2,999	0.48
Myagmaryn Otgonbaatar	Civil Movement Party	2,785	0.44
Fyeodoryn Zorigoo	HUN Party	2,737	0.44
Büdeegiin Khökhöö	Truth and Right Party	2,726	0.43
Chagnaadorjiin Khongorzul	Civil Will–Green Party	2,604	0.41
Tömörkhürdiin Khürelbat	New United Coalition	2,360	0.38
Luvsannyamyn Ösökhjargal	New United Coalition	2,332	0.37
Yandagiin Boldbaatar	Civil Movement Party	2,313	0.37
Nyamdavaagiin Bolortsetseg	Truth and Right Party	2,252	0.36
Tsagaanchuluuny Mönkhzul	New United Coalition	2,209	0.35
Jamsrangiin Uranchimeg	Civil Will–Green Party	2,183	0.35
Ölzii-Orshikhyn Mönkh-Amgalan	Civil Movement Party	2,177	0.35
Khüreltsoojiin Nominsuvd	HUN Party	2,010	0.32
Dashdoorovyn Chimegsaikhan	Civil Movement Party	1,972	0.31
Baataryn Oyuun	Civil Will–Green Party	1,948	0.31
Sükhbatyn Enkhtaivan	Civil Movement Party	1,864	0.30
Törmönkhiin Buyanjargal	Civil Movement Party	1,764	0.28
Oyuunbatyn Bayasakh	Civil Will–Green Party	1,711	0.27
Tsogbaataryn Gandolgor	HUN Party	1,584	0.25
Janjaadorjiin Oyuunbayar	HUN Party	1,576	0.25
Nyamyn Tserendavga	New United Coalition	1,493	0.24
Batboldyn Javkhlan	Republican Party	1,468	0.23
Bataagiin Gerelt-Tsolmon	Truth and Right Party	1,418	0.23
Dagvadorjiin Dovchinsüren	Truth and Right Party	1,414	0.23
Myagmarsürengiin Sarangaravuu	Motherland Party	1,388	0.22
Sharkhüügiin Buyantogtokh	People's Majority Rule Party	1,240	0.20
Sanjaajavyn Tsogzolmaa	Republican Party	841	0.13
Baatarjavyn Batbayar	Republican Party	786	0.13
Ikhbaataryn Zolzayaa	Freedom Alliance Party	661	0.11
Gürsoronzongombosüre Ngiin Otgonbaatar	Freedom Alliance Party	655	0.10
Amarsanaagiin Mönkhzul	Freedom Alliance Party	596	0.09
Sodnomyn Nergüi	People's Power Party	581	0.09
Ganzorigiin Mönkh-Erdene	Freedom Alliance Party	565	0.09
Olzvoin Togtokhzayaa	Citizen Participation Union Party	560	0.09
Semjidiin Enkhtüvshin	Mongolian Conservative Party	559	0.09
Ganbaataryn Enkh-Undrakh	People's Power Party	492	0.08
Nyamkhüügiin Galbadrakh	Good Democratic Citizens United Party	477	0.08
Altantulgyn Khaliun	People's Power Party	421	0.07
Sangaagiin Myagmar-Od	People's Power Party	415	0.07
Damdinbaljiryn Sarantuyaa	Good Democratic Citizens United Party	410	0.07
Ganbatyn Pürevdemberel	For the Mongolian People Party	404	0.06
Davaasürengiin Narangarav	Good Democratic Citizens United Party	399	0.06
Enkhboldyn Chinbold	For the Mongolian People Party	370	0.06
Bashliin Nyamkhüü	Citizen Participation Union Party	333	0.05
Baasanjavyn Batzul	Mongolian Conservative Party	330	0.05
Sharkhüügiin Tsogmaam	For the Mongolian People Party	324	0.05
Byambajavyn Ölziikhishig	Citizen Participation Union Party	324	0.05
Luvsanjambyn Khash-Erdene	Mongolian Conservative Party	281	0.04
Nyamsürengiin Erdenechimeg	Freedom Alliance Party	275	0.04
Chogdogiin Byambatseren	Citizen Participation Union Party	261	0.04
Ochirkhüügiin Altanbayar	Citizen Participation Union Party	222	0.04
Total		628,310	100.00
Valid votes		89,331	99.39
Invalid/blank votes		551	0.61
Total votes		89,882	100.00
Registered voters/turnout		132,090	68.05

8th Constituency
Candidate	Party	Votes	%
Jigjidsürengiin Chinbüren	Mongolian People's Party	58,854	6.81
Battömöriin Enkhbayar	Mongolian People's Party	56,247	6.51
Pürevsürengiin Naranbayar	HUN Party	53,358	6.18
Enkhtaivany Bat-Amgalan	Mongolian People's Party	52,872	6.12
Khürelbaataryn Bulgantuya	Mongolian People's Party	51,214	5.93
Natsagiin Bayarmönkh	Mongolian People's Party	48,230	5.58
Mainbayaryn Tulgat	Democratic Party	47,893	5.54
Tümendelgeriin Battsogt	Democratic Party	45,661	5.29
Ganboldyn Bolormaa	Democratic Party	45,549	5.27
Tsagaan-Övgönii Jadambaa	Democratic Party	41,312	4.78
Ochirsuuriin Tsetsegbal	HUN Party	29,472	3.41
Ganboldyn Uugantsetseg	Democratic Party	27,955	3.24
Ganbaataryn Battömör	HUN Party	24,340	2.82
Erdenechimegiin Enkhzorig	New United Coalition	18,711	2.17
Dorjlkhagvyn Battsetseg	HUN Party	17,618	2.04
Ganboldyn Batbold	Good Democratic Citizens United Party	16,941	1.96
Buyantogtokhyn Alimaa	HUN Party	16,216	1.88
Bayarboldyn Jadamba	National Coalition	15,527	1.80
Boldyn Gantulga	New United Coalition	11,542	1.34
Buyandelgeriin Nandin-Erdene	Civil Will–Green Party	8,421	0.97
Damdinsürengiin Mönkhtsetseg	Civil Will–Green Party	8,376	0.97
Yadamsürengiin Batkhüü	New United Coalition	7,831	0.91
Namkhaidagvyn Temüüjin	Truth and Right Party	7,765	0.90
Batdelgeriin Erdenebayar	National Coalition	7,687	0.89
Bat-Ochiryn Tsatsral	Freedom Alliance Party	7,578	0.88
Enkhtuyaagiin Erdenetuyaa	New United Coalition	7,123	0.82
Pürevtserengiin Enkhtsetseg	National Coalition	6,789	0.79
Tsendiin Mönkhtsatsral	National Coalition	6,625	0.77
Gürdorjiin Batbayar	New United Coalition	6,420	0.74
Gandansürengiin Ganzorig	Civil Will–Green Party	6,292	0.73
Jamsrangiin Batsükh	Civil Will–Green Party	6,040	0.70
Enkhjargalyn Odbayar	Civil Will–Green Party	5,608	0.65
Gotovyn Battulga	Republican Party	4,841	0.56
Batbayaryn Ariunzayaa	Citizen Participation Union Party	4,086	0.47
Chuluunkhüügiin Uuganbaatar	Truth and Right Party	3,428	0.40
Tsedmaajavyn Batdorj	Truth and Right Party	3,421	0.40
Chuluunbaataryn Sugarsüren	Truth and Right Party	3,241	0.38
Dashtserengiin Tögsbayar	Civil Movement Party	3,065	0.35
Amartüvshingiin Bolor-Erdene	Civil Movement Party	2,949	0.34
Zorigtyn Otgonbayar	Freedom Implementing Party	2,569	0.30
Gombogüriin Undram	Civil Movement Party	2,559	0.30
Dorjkhandyn Narantuyaa	For the Mongolian People Party	2,514	0.29
Luvsandorjiin Batbayar	Republican Party	2,478	0.29
Tsogbadrakhyn Batbold	Citizen Participation Union Party	2,391	0.28
Rentsengiin Sünjidmaa	Republican Party	2,257	0.26
Ulambayaryn Khosbayar	Mongolian Conservative Party	2,140	0.25
Bayarsaikhany Ganchimeg	Republican Party	2,101	0.24
Dashtsoodolyn Khandsüren	Citizen Participation Union Party	2,072	0.24
Baasandorjiin Altanzul	Civil Movement Party	2,038	0.24
Sükhbaataryn Batbold	Motherland Party	2,009	0.23
Battulgyn Batbaatar	People's Power Party	1,974	0.23
Davaatserengiin Lkhachinsüren	Truth and Right Party	1,955	0.23
Erdenebatyn Amarmönkh	Republican Party	1,875	0.22
Tserendorjiin Altantsetseg	Motherland Party	1,815	0.21
Altan-Avdaryn Ireedüi	People's Power Party	1,808	0.21
Vanluugiin Dügermaa	People's Majority Rule Party	1,794	0.21
Tüüchintavyn Dorjgotov	Citizen Participation Union Party	1,645	0.19
Dorjgotovyn Otgonbayar	For the Mongolian People Party	1,574	0.18
Rentsendashiin Olonbayar	Mongolian Social Democratic Party	1,509	0.17
Delgerbatyn Nasanbayar	Freedom Alliance Party	1,491	0.17
Altankhuyagiin Tegshbayar	For the Mongolian People Party	1,469	0.17
Nyamdorjiin Sodchimeg	Civil Movement Party	1,446	0.17
Bat-Erdeniin Tserenlkham	Citizen Participation Union Party	1,398	0.16
Altankhüügiin Mönkhtuyaa	For the Mongolian People Party	1,230	0.14
Baastyn Zorigbayar	Freedom Implementing Party	1,180	0.14
Bayarmagnaigiin Taivanbaatar	Freedom Alliance Party	1,158	0.13
Dondogiin Tömörbaatar	People's Majority Rule Party	1,156	0.13
Otgonbayaryn Ariuntuyaa	Mongolian Conservative Party	1,151	0.13
Erdenebatyn Enkhbaatar	People's Majority Rule Party	1,111	0.13
Baigali-Erdeniin Ariunaa	Mongolian Social Democratic Party	1,100	0.13
Enkhboldyn Mergenshagai	Good Democratic Citizens United Party	1,058	0.12
Sharav-Osoryn Khandsüren	Motherland Party	1,057	0.12
Nokhoijavyn Batbold	Good Democratic Citizens United Party	1,055	0.12
Togmidyn Sünjidmaa	People's Power Party	1,027	0.12
Erdene-Ochiryn Enkhbold	Mongolian Conservative Party	955	0.11
Shagdarsürengiin Tögsbayar	Mongolian Social Democratic Party	870	0.10
Ayuushiin Dolgor	People's Majority Rule Party	866	0.10
Serchindorjiin Byamba	Freedom Alliance Party	857	0.10
Bayarsaikhany Chimegsaikhan	Good Democratic Citizens United Party	851	0.10
Dendeviin Sandagsüren	Motherland Party	844	0.10
Nergüin Enkhee	People's Majority Rule Party	840	0.10
Zorigtyn Khand	People's Power Party	775	0.09
Amarsaikhany Batjargal	People's Power Party	760	0.09
Total		863,880	100.00
Valid votes		171,536	99.10
Invalid/blank votes		1,550	0.90
Total votes		173,086	100.00
Registered voters/turnout		243,918	70.96

9th Constituency
Candidate	Party	Votes	%
Jargalsaikhany Zoljargal	HUN Party	39,771	12.71
Khassuuriin Gankhuyag	Mongolian People's Party	39,012	12.46
Jambalyn Ganbaatar	Mongolian People's Party	28,414	9.08
Ölzii-Orshikhyn Sum'yabaatar	Mongolian People's Party	27,941	8.93
Sharavdembereliin Enkhtuul	HUN Party	20,698	6.61
Tserendulamyn Altantsetseg	Democratic Party	16,539	5.28
Sodnomzunduin Erdene	Democratic Party	15,852	5.06
Tömör-Ukhnyn Zolboot	HUN Party	15,476	4.94
Tsedeviin Tavanchuluu	Democratic Party	13,485	4.31
Namsraijavyn Enkhchimeg	National Coalition	12,180	3.89
Altankhuyagiin Barkhüü	New United Coalition	8,546	2.73
Jargalsaikhany Khongorzul	National Coalition	7,864	2.51
Tsültemiin Enkhjin	Civil Will–Green Party	4,905	1.57
Grishagiin Uugankhüü	Civil Will–Green Party	4,796	1.53
Taivanbaataryn Orgilmönkh	New United Coalition	4,112	1.31
Khürelbaataryn Suvdaa	Civil Will–Green Party	3,980	1.27
Tömörkhuyagiin Narantuyaa	Civil Movement Party	3,939	1.26
Boryn Möngönkhishig	New United Coalition	3,855	1.23
Bayasgalangiin Sükhbaatar	Truth and Right Party	3,430	1.10
Ganbaataryn Shijirbat	Independent	3,021	0.97
Regzengiin Batbayar	Republican Party	2,679	0.86
Dorjsürengiin Enkh-Amgalan	Independent	2,584	0.83
Dorjderemiin Erdenetuyaa	Citizen Participation Union Party	2,176	0.70
Otgonbayaryn Oyuundari	Civil Movement Party	2,159	0.69
Galsangiin Nyamdarjaa	Independent	2,015	0.64
Sugarjavyn Tserensodnom	Independent	1,745	0.56
Tömörkhuyagiin Bolortungalag	Civil Movement Party	1,732	0.55
Chuluundorjiin Battunkhag	Truth and Right Party	1,675	0.54
Mönkhtogoogiin Byambabat	Citizen Participation Union Party	1,469	0.47
Enkhbaataryn Byambasüren	Republican Party	1,463	0.47
Natsagiin Maraltsetseg	Republican Party	1,391	0.44
Chuluunbatyn Nyamsambuu	Good Democratic Citizens United Party	1,361	0.43
Ganbatyn Mönkhjargal	For the Mongolian People Party	1,290	0.41
Dugarsürengiin Boldbaatar	People's Power Party	1,160	0.37
Shoovdoryn Tömörsükh	Freedom Implementing Party	1,083	0.35
Jalbaagiin Batbileg	Mongolian Conservative Party	978	0.31
Dorjiin Baigalmaa	Motherland Party	860	0.27
Buyandalain Byambasüren	Citizen Participation Union Party	836	0.27
Sodnompilyn Ninj	Motherland Party	822	0.26
Altanbaganyn Manlaibaatar	Freedom Alliance Party	708	0.23
Tserenbaljiryn Zorigtbaatar	People's Majority Rule Party	646	0.21
Batmönkhiin Byambagerel	Freedom Alliance Party	571	0.18
Gantömöriin Tuul	Motherland Party	531	0.17
Dugarjavyn Bayanmönkh	Freedom Alliance Party	523	0.17
Ganbatyn Ariunbüüvei	People's Power Party	520	0.17
Tsendiin Batsükh	People's Majority Rule Party	507	0.16
Chogsomyn Oyuuntungalag	Freedom Implementing Party	468	0.15
Dolgorsürengiin Bayarsaikhan	Freedom Implementing Party	443	0.14
Damdinsürengiin Odgerel	People's Majority Rule Party	443	0.14
Mönkh-Amgalangiin Baasantsend	People's Power Party	357	0.11
Total		313,011	100.00
Valid votes		103,875	99.34
Invalid/blank votes		693	0.66
Total votes		104,568	100.00
Registered voters/turnout		145,838	71.70

10th Constituency
Candidate	Party	Votes	%
Nyam-Osoryn Uchral	Mongolian People's Party	67,107	8.85
Otgonsharyn Batnairamdal	Mongolian People's Party	43,261	5.71
Tsendiin Baatarkhüü	Democratic Party	36,540	4.82
Natsagdorjiin Batsümberel	Mongolian People's Party	34,261	4.52
Damdiny Tsogtbaatar	Mongolian People's Party	32,907	4.34
Khökhkhüügiin Bolormaa	Democratic Party	32,279	4.26
Bazarsadyn Jargalsaikhan	Republican Party	30,930	4.08
Ganzorigiin Dashnyam	Mongolian People's Party	30,727	4.05
Chadraabalyn Önörbayar	Democratic Party	29,446	3.88
Mönkhöögiin Oyuunchimeg	Mongolian People's Party	27,995	3.69
Davaasürengiin Badarsan	Democratic Party	26,906	3.55
Tsenddorjiin Erdenebat	HUN Party	26,379	3.48
Ishjamtsyn Mönkhjargal	Democratic Party	25,449	3.36
Oktyabriin Baasankhüü	Democratic Party	23,769	3.14
Pürveegiin Bayarkhüü	National Coalition	16,144	2.13
Dorjvalyn Enkhjargal	HUN Party	14,630	1.93
Dorjoogiin Batsaikhan	HUN Party	14,337	1.89
Ranjilyn Badmaanyambuu	HUN Party	13,607	1.80
Battsengeliin Khash-Erdene	HUN Party	12,197	1.61
Ragchaagiin Erdenebileg	HUN Party	11,881	1.57
Davaagiin Ganbold	National Coalition	11,761	1.55
Jukovyn Bayarjavkhlan	Civil Will–Green Party	10,986	1.45
Dashiin Batsükh	Independent	10,903	1.44
Chimeddorjiin Amarsanaa	New United Coalition	9,346	1.23
Tserendambyn Bayarkhüü	New United Coalition	7,939	1.05
Tsegmediin Bumtsend	New United Coalition	7,934	1.05
Enebishiin Odontuyaa	Civil Will–Green Party	7,657	1.01
Jargalsaikhany Ünenbayar	Truth and Right Party	7,278	0.96
Jamsrandorjiin Tsogzolmaa	National Coalition	6,829	0.90
Sanjaasürengiin Ganbat	National Coalition	5,990	0.79
Mönkhbatyn Ariunzul	New United Coalition	5,229	0.69
Serjgotovyn Khan-Uul	Civil Will–Green Party	5,076	0.67
Chimedregzengiin Batbaatar	New United Coalition	4,568	0.60
Myangan-Yondongiin Mönkhjargal	Civil Will–Green Party	4,444	0.59
Zorigiin Tuyaa	Citizen Participation Union Party	4,292	0.57
Enkhboldyn Bat-Orshikh	Truth and Right Party	4,197	0.55
Nergüin Lkhagva-Ochir	Civil Will–Green Party	4,123	0.54
Sambuugiin Tömörbat	Republican Party	3,839	0.51
Erdeniin Odongerel	Mongolian Conservative Party	3,772	0.50
Tsendsürengiin Ganbat	Civil Movement Party	3,697	0.49
Yondonsambuugiin Batbayar	Republican Party	3,472	0.46
Tsogtsaikhany Pürevsüren	New United Coalition	3,453	0.46
Myagmarjavyn Uranchimeg	Truth and Right Party	3,422	0.45
Günzengiin Byambadorj	Civil Will–Green Party	3,303	0.44
Dashzevegiin Ad'yaabaatar	Truth and Right Party	2,631	0.35
Jantsandorjiin Yanjinsüren	Republican Party	2,472	0.33
Shagdarsürengiin Ariunaa	Civil Movement Party	2,236	0.29
Baasanjavyn Amarsaikhan	For the Mongolian People Party	2,152	0.28
Batsükhiin Gombosüren	Truth and Right Party	2,137	0.28
Erdene-Ochiryn Ankhtuyaa	Civil Movement Party	2,135	0.28
Tömörkhuyagiin Ögöömörzayaa	Citizen Participation Union Party	1,953	0.26
Khürelbaataryn Zorig	Citizen Participation Union Party	1,929	0.25
Jantsanpüreviin Amgalanbaatar	People's Power Party	1,888	0.25
Ganbaataryn Uranchimeg	Civil Movement Party	1,879	0.25
Sarantuyaagiin Narantuyaa	Freedom Implementing Party	1,859	0.25
Törbatyn Tenüün	Motherland Party	1,709	0.23
Dugarjavyn Ariunaa	Citizen Participation Union Party	1,699	0.22
Batbaataryn Günjinlkham	Civil Movement Party	1,684	0.22
Boldoogiin Batnasan	Motherland Party	1,662	0.22
Rentsendoorovyn Battömör	People's Majority Rule Party	1,554	0.21
Dorjiin Soyolmaa	Motherland Party	1,552	0.20
Dorjgotovyn Nyamtseren	Civil Movement Party	1,472	0.19
Baatarjavyn Altanbagana	Good Democratic Citizens United Party	1,458	0.19
Myagmardashiin Orkhonbayar	Citizen Participation Union Party	1,432	0.19
Byambaagiin Ganbaatar	Freedom Alliance Party	1,353	0.18
Sambuugiin Mönkhtsetseg	For the Mongolian People Party	1,330	0.18
Lkhagvajavyn Tuyaa	People's Power Party	1,293	0.17
Namsrain Enkhtsolmon	Good Democratic Citizens United Party	1,200	0.16
Avidyn Tamir	For the Mongolian People Party	1,192	0.16
Bayarmagnaigiin Önör-Orshikh	Freedom Alliance Party	1,168	0.15
Baljiryn Mönkhtuyaa	Freedom Alliance Party	1,167	0.15
Tulgaagiin Zolbayar	Freedom Alliance Party	1,047	0.14
Lamjavyn Adilbish	Freedom Implementing Party	1,037	0.14
Bürenjargalyn Batmönkh	Freedom Implementing Party	1,004	0.13
Sükhbaataryn Sod-Erdene	People's Power Party	991	0.13
Baasangiin Otgontsetseg	People's Power Party	932	0.12
Bazarbidarinyn Dorjsüren	Citizen Participation Union Party	922	0.12
Ganbatyn Sanchir	People's Power Party	921	0.12
Tömörkhuyagiin Khandmaa	Motherland Party	904	0.12
Jadambyn Naranchimeg	People's Power Party	836	0.11
Pürevdorjiin Erdenebulgan	Freedom Alliance Party	830	0.11
Sanjmyatavyn Saruul-Amidral	People's Majority Rule Party	783	0.10
Erdenetsogtyn Batchimeg	Freedom Alliance Party	780	0.10
Mudgyn Togtokhbayar	Motherland Party	744	0.10
Tseveendorjiin Erdemt	People's Majority Rule Party	725	0.10
Dashrentsengiin Naranjargal	People's Majority Rule Party	708	0.09
Dashzevegiin Lkhagvabayar	Good Democratic Citizens United Party	696	0.09
Khürelbaataryn Enkhtuyaa	Freedom Implementing Party	683	0.09
Bazarvaaniin Uranbileg	Motherland Party	660	0.09
Byambaagiin Zuunnast	For the Mongolian People Party	654	0.09
Chuluunbaataryn Bayarsodnom	People's Majority Rule Party	604	0.08
Gombojavyn Oyuunbayar	Freedom Implementing Party	592	0.08
Dariin Lkhagvadorj	People's Majority Rule Party	463	0.06
Total		757,974	100.00
Valid votes		125,249	98.98
Invalid/blank votes		1,296	1.02
Total votes		126,545	100.00
Registered voters/turnout		182,511	69.34

11th Constituency
Candidate	Party	Votes	%
Enkhbayaryn Batshugar	Mongolian People's Party	58,914	8.48
Norovyn Altankhuyag	Democratic Party	53,659	7.73
Narantsetsegiin Altanshagai	Mongolian People's Party	48,527	6.99
Pürevjavyn Sainzorig	Mongolian People's Party	46,833	6.74
Chinbatyn Nomin	Mongolian People's Party	44,187	6.36
Nyamdavaagiin Khürelbaatar	Mongolian People's Party	43,661	6.29
Nemekhbayaryn Amarjin	Democratic Party	39,842	5.74
Pürevdorjiin Galindev	Democratic Party	35,050	5.05
Gantömöriin Khajidmaa	Civil Will–Green Party	28,541	4.11
Jadambaagiin Otgonbayar	Democratic Party	27,939	4.02
Tsoggereliin Uyanga	Democratic Party	19,985	2.88
Gansükhiin Maitsetseg	HUN Party	19,151	2.76
Baljinnyamyn Tsegmed	Independent	18,293	2.63
Jagvaralyn Tömörkhuyag	HUN Party	13,080	1.88
Gendendaramyn Batzorig	HUN Party	10,725	1.54
Chuluuny Bayarsaikhan	HUN Party	10,662	1.54
Otgonsürengiin Tsogtbayar	Civil Will–Green Party	8,350	1.20
Ochirbatyn Uuganbayar	Civil Will–Green Party	7,745	1.12
Jügdernamjilyn Bayarkhüü	Truth and Right Party	7,734	1.11
Jargalsaikhany Üüriinzayaa	Civil Will–Green Party	7,596	1.09
Narantsetsegiin Oyuungerel	Civil Movement Party	6,161	0.89
Nyam-Osoryn Bürenbat	National Coalition	6,030	0.87
Tömörkhuyagiin Naranzul	New United Coalition	5,761	0.83
Tsetsegmaagiin Baasanjav	Civil Will–Green Party	5,519	0.79
Tümen-Oiloogiin Tsooj	New United Coalition	5,410	0.78
Tseveenii Beejin	National Coalition	5,254	0.76
Badarchiin Odkhüü	Independent	5,186	0.75
Nyangaryn Batchuluun	New United Coalition	5,131	0.74
Narantsetsegiin Battogtokh	New United Coalition	5,088	0.73
Baatar-Ochiryn Enkhnaran	National Coalition	4,322	0.62
Namdagiin Natsagdorj	Independent	4,320	0.62
Yunrengiin Darambazar	Independent	4,120	0.59
Zagdaagiin Gerelt-Od	Truth and Right Party	3,849	0.55
Düngeegiin Lkhagvadorj	New United Coalition	3,616	0.52
Lkhagvyn Enkhbold	Independent	3,572	0.51
Ad'yaagiin Erdenebileg	Mongolian Social Democratic Party	3,418	0.49
Choijiljavyn Batbayar	Republican Party	3,328	0.48
Dünshigiin Myagmarsüren	Truth and Right Party	3,013	0.43
Dogsomchuluuny Üüriintuyaa	Civil Movement Party	2,892	0.42
Dashdorjiin Myadagmaa	Truth and Right Party	2,841	0.41
Khishigdulamyn Oyuunbayar	Truth and Right Party	2,819	0.41
Dorjjantsangiin Bolortuyaa	Republican Party	2,518	0.36
Sükhiin Ochir	Republican Party	2,423	0.35
Dashdorjiin Narmandakh	Republican Party	2,345	0.34
Khadbaataryn Batchimeg	Civil Movement Party	2,328	0.34
Pürevjavyn Bayarkhüü	Freedom Alliance Party	2,216	0.32
Ganbaataryn Amartüvshin	Freedom Alliance Party	2,076	0.30
Ichinkhorloogiin Sarangerel	Citizen Participation Union Party	1,959	0.28
Tserenbatyn Badamsüren	Civil Movement Party	1,795	0.26
Baatarjavyn Ganzorig	For the Mongolian People Party	1,681	0.24
Batsuuriin Enkh-Amgalan	Motherland Party	1,625	0.23
Naryn Sarangerel	Freedom Alliance Party	1,532	0.22
Shagdaryn Ölziitogtokh	Citizen Participation Union Party	1,483	0.21
Byambajavyn Nyamtsagaan	Civil Movement Party	1,478	0.21
Badarchiin Yeröölt	Motherland Party	1,425	0.21
Sharav-Osoryn Gantögs	Motherland Party	1,347	0.19
Boldyn Enkhtüvshin	Mongolian Conservative Party	1,198	0.17
Uranchimegiin Khaliunaa	Freedom Alliance Party	1,162	0.17
Chimediin Baasanjav	People's Power Party	1,125	0.16
Ganboldyn Khongorzul	Freedom Implementing Party	1,113	0.16
Javzangiin Namnansüren	People's Power Party	1,048	0.15
Togoogiin Ganbat	Citizen Participation Union Party	1,045	0.15
Boldbaataryn Tungalagkharaa	Republican Party	1,017	0.15
Chültemsürengiin Chunt	Citizen Participation Union Party	998	0.14
Lkhündeviin Lkhagvadorj	People's Majority Rule Party	944	0.14
Ajirshavgaany Enkhbaatar	Citizen Participation Union Party	937	0.13
Yundengiin Batchuluun	For the Mongolian People Party	890	0.13
Boldyn Soyol-Erdene	Freedom Implementing Party	856	0.12
Tsendkhüügiin Zandankhüü	For the Mongolian People Party	849	0.12
Sampilnorovyn Batbold	For the Mongolian People Party	840	0.12
Pürevsürengiin Ulambayar	People's Power Party	839	0.12
Begziin Khishigbayar	People's Majority Rule Party	811	0.12
Khishigtogtokhyn Mönkhtogtokh	Mongolian Conservative Party	779	0.11
Amindavaagiin Davaadorj	Good Democratic Citizens United Party	775	0.11
Dulamyn Sanchir	Good Democratic Citizens United Party	756	0.11
Tömör-Ochiryn Myagmardorj	Motherland Party	743	0.11
Nasbatyn Sugarsüren	Motherland Party	729	0.10
Sharavyn Tömör	Freedom Implementing Party	697	0.10
Nyamdovdongiin Gantuyaa	People's Majority Rule Party	684	0.10
Baasansürengiin Oyuunjargal	Good Democratic Citizens United Party	656	0.09
Tsogtbaataryn Baasandorj	Mongolian Conservative Party	652	0.09
Namnangiin Enkh-Ölzii	People's Majority Rule Party	557	0.08
Denzengiin Chuluunbat	People's Majority Rule Party	548	0.08
Lkhamyn Khishigdavaa	Freedom Implementing Party	476	0.07
Khuunain Böndör	People's Power Party	471	0.07
Total		694,550	100.00
Valid votes		137,878	99.07
Invalid/blank votes		1,290	0.93
Total votes		139,168	100.00
Registered voters/turnout		219,313	63.46

12th Constituency
Candidate	Party	Votes	%
Togtmolyn Mönkhsaikhan	Mongolian People's Party	45,396	13.11
Chuluunbilegiin Lodoisambuu	Democratic Party	40,937	11.82
Jukovyn Aldarjavkhlan	Mongolian People's Party	40,915	11.82
Sanjaadorjiin Molor-Erdene	Civil Will–Green Party	22,474	6.49
Tsedevdambyn Oyungerel	Citizen Participation Union Party	22,419	6.47
Luvsandashiin Ninjjamts	Mongolian People's Party	22,384	6.46
Erdene-Ochiryn Tamir	Democratic Party	17,090	4.94
Byambasürengiin Jagar	Good Democratic Citizens United Party	16,261	4.70
Banzragchiin Otgontögs	HUN Party	15,594	4.50
Sodnomdorjiin Sanaser	HUN Party	15,470	4.47
Byambyn Ariunbold	Democratic Party	14,002	4.04
Altansükhiin Mandakhnaran	HUN Party	11,051	3.19
Batmönkhiin Tsetsegsaikhan	National Coalition	5,705	1.65
Khosbayaryn Amarsaikhan	National Coalition	5,647	1.63
Altangereliin Batmönkh	Independent	4,858	1.40
Seteviin Shaariibuu	Civil Will–Green Party	4,095	1.18
Byambasürengiin Bayarmaa	New United Coalition	3,824	1.10
Shagdarsürengiin Bat-Erdene	New United Coalition	3,590	1.04
Nadmidtserengiin Tamir	New United Coalition	3,584	1.04
Tsogt-Ochiryn Jargalsaikhan	Republican Party	3,180	0.92
Batbayaryn Bat-Ochir	Truth and Right Party	3,154	0.91
Boldyn Mönkhsaikhan	Truth and Right Party	2,891	0.83
Bayarkhüügiin Bat-Yalalt	Freedom Alliance Party	2,195	0.63
Pürevkhüügiin Minjmaa	Civil Will–Green Party	2,132	0.62
Jürmediin Zanaa	Civil Movement Party	1,972	0.57
Barbaataryn Bolortuyaa	Civil Movement Party	1,470	0.42
Chuluunbatyn Batchimeg	Citizen Participation Union Party	1,353	0.39
Gankhuyagiin Undral	Truth and Right Party	1,318	0.38
Pürevdorjiin Bayartüvshin	Citizen Participation Union Party	1,259	0.36
Bayaraagiin Amarmend	Civil Movement Party	1,168	0.34
Zandar'yaagiin Ariunaa	Republican Party	830	0.24
Gochoosürengiin Batjargal	Mongolian Conservative Party	785	0.23
Baasanbyambyn Sanchirmaa	Republican Party	767	0.22
Tsagaany Chinbat	Motherland Party	579	0.17
Distein Tulga	For the Mongolian People Party	522	0.15
Ganboldyn Ariuntuyaa	Motherland Party	501	0.14
Tserendagvyn Oyuunaa	Mongolian Social Democratic Party	451	0.13
Banzragchiin Törbold	Mongolian Social Democratic Party	441	0.13
Tömöriin Ganchimeg	Freedom Alliance Party	425	0.12
Battömöriin Mönkhtsetseg	People's Power Party	420	0.12
Dorjpüreviin Tsolmonkhüü	People's Power Party	417	0.12
Pürevdorjiin Enkhmend	Freedom Alliance Party	411	0.12
Yundengiin Batbold	For the Mongolian People Party	397	0.11
Baljinnyamyn Narangerel	For the Mongolian People Party	393	0.11
Bayaraagiin Mandakh	People's Power Party	369	0.11
Sükhbaataryn Bürentsogt	Motherland Party	361	0.10
Tsegmediin Dagvadorj	People's Majority Rule Party	311	0.09
Jam'yangiin Pürevdorj	People's Majority Rule Party	270	0.08
Dügerjavyn Batbaatar	People's Majority Rule Party	228	0.07
Total		346,266	100.00
Valid votes		115,068	99.54
Invalid/blank votes		531	0.46
Total votes		115,599	100.00
Registered voters/turnout		153,077	75.52

13th Constituency
Candidate	Party	Votes	%
Sainbuyangiin Amarsaikhan	Mongolian People's Party	16,539	26.26
Tsendiin Sandag-Ochir	Mongolian People's Party	12,347	19.60
Dashzevegiin Altankhuyag	Democratic Party	9,745	15.47
Ganaagiin Tsambagarav	Democratic Party	7,493	11.90
Badralyn Mönkhdöl	HUN Party	3,517	5.58
Bat-Ochiryn Enkhmaa	HUN Party	3,142	4.99
Sükhbaataryn Tsogzolmaa	National Coalition	2,151	3.42
Batbilegiin Erdenebayar	New United Coalition	1,245	1.98
Mangaagiin Batnasan	Civil Will–Green Party	1,189	1.89
Naranbadrakhyn Enkhbold	Truth and Right Party	849	1.35
Myagmarjavyn Baatarkhuyag	Truth and Right Party	558	0.89
Lkhagvyn Densmaa	Civil Movement Party	376	0.60
Tömörbaataryn Batbold	Republican Party	342	0.54
Chuluuny Manduul	Freedom Implementing Party	342	0.54
Altantsoojiin Khaliunaa	Civil Movement Party	317	0.50
Dorjvain Enkhtör	Motherland Party	281	0.45
Gerelmaagiin Ankhzayaa	For the Mongolian People Party	245	0.39
Dorjpalamyn Tsengelmaa	Mongolian Liberal Democratic Party	232	0.37
Bat-Ochiryn Otgon	Freedom Alliance Party	231	0.37
Tündeviin Dariimaa	United Patriots Party	213	0.34
Sandagdariin Ganbaatar	People's Majority Rule Party	183	0.29
Tseveliin Dolgormaa	People's Majority Rule Party	183	0.29
Lkhagvaagiin Khulan	Freedom Alliance Party	175	0.28
Chuluuntogtokhyn Gansüren	Citizen Participation Union Party	175	0.28
Samdannorovyn Zoltoi	Republican Party	164	0.26
Mönkhtuyaagiin Oyuunkhishig	Citizen Participation Union Party	158	0.25
Naranchimegiin Uyanga	People's Majority Rule Party	145	0.23
Tamiryn Tögöldör	People's Majority Rule Party	120	0.19
Minaryn Büdragchaa	Mongolian Conservative Party	116	0.18
Batjargalyn Bayarmaa	Mongolian Conservative Party	89	0.14
Nagaanragchaagiin Khangalbaatar	Good Democratic Citizens United Party	62	0.10
Boldbaataryn Bolor	Good Democratic Citizens United Party	62	0.10
Total		62,986	100.00
Valid votes		31,401	99.42
Invalid/blank votes		184	0.58
Total votes		31,585	100.00
Registered voters/turnout		48,489	65.14

=== Incumbents who were unseated ===
Members of Parliament who lost re-election
MP	Seat	First elected	Party	New MP	New party
Gombojavyn Zandanshatar	Bayankhongor	2004 (Note: Zandanshatar lost his seat in 2012 but was re-elected through an election in 2016)	Mongolian People's Party	Not applicable	
Amgalangiin Adiyaasüren	Bayankhongor	2020	Democratic Party	Not applicable	
Dulamdorjiin Togtokhsüren	Övörkhangai	2016	Mongolian People's Party	Not applicable	
Sodnomyn Chinzorig	Övörkhangai	2016	Mongolian People's Party	Not applicable	
Gochoogiin Ganbold	Övörkhangai	2020	Mongolian People's Party	Not applicable	
Tsedendambyn Tserenpuntsag	Zavkhan	2020	Mongolian People's Party	Not applicable	
Baljinnyamyn Bayarsaikhan	Zavkhan	2020	Mongolian People's Party	Not applicable	
Shirnenbanidiin Adishaa	Khovd	2020	Democratic Party	Not applicable	
Chimediin Khürelbaatar	Uvs	2008	Mongolian People's Party	Not applicable	
Damdinsürengiin Önörbolor	Selenge	2020	Mongolian People's Party	Not applicable	
Purev-Ochiryn Anujin	Songino Khairkhan	2020	Mongolian People's Party	Not applicable	
Nayantain Ganibal	Sükhbaatar	2020	Democratic Party	Not applicable	
Tömörtogoogiin Enkhtüvshin	Dornogovi	2020	Mongolian People's Party	Not applicable	
Batsükhiin Saranchimeg	Bayanzürkh	2016	Mongolian People's Party	Not applicable	
Gompildoogiin Mönkhtsetseg	Dundgovi; Govisümber	2016	Mongolian People's Party	Not applicable	
Mönkhöögiin Oyuunchimeg	Chingeltei	2016	Mongolian People's Party	Not applicable	

== See also ==
- Politics of Mongolia
- List of legislatures by country
- List of political parties in Mongolia
