= 2008 riot in Mongolia =

Rioting in Ulaanbataar, Mongolia

2008 Mongolian riot
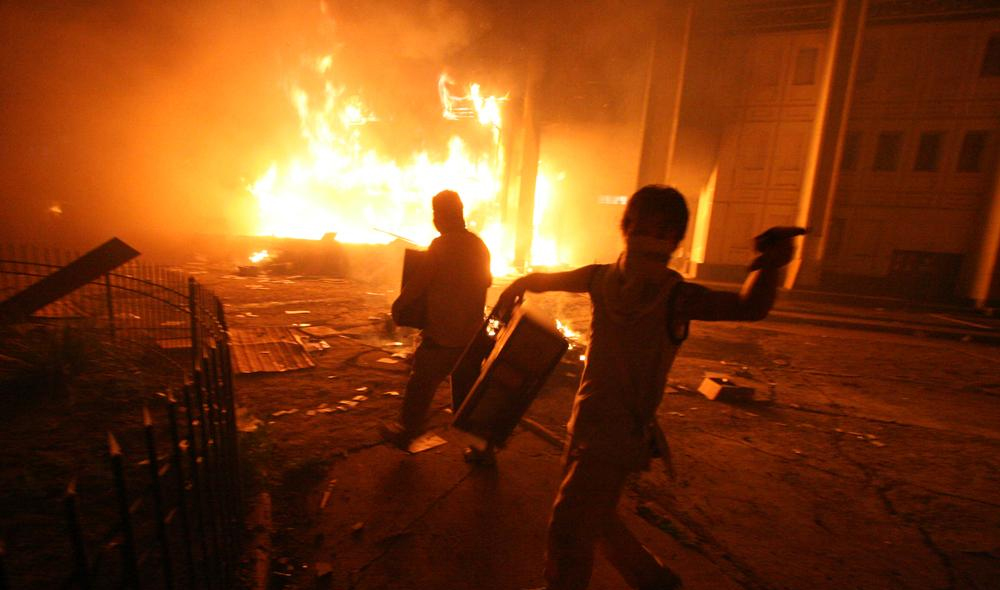
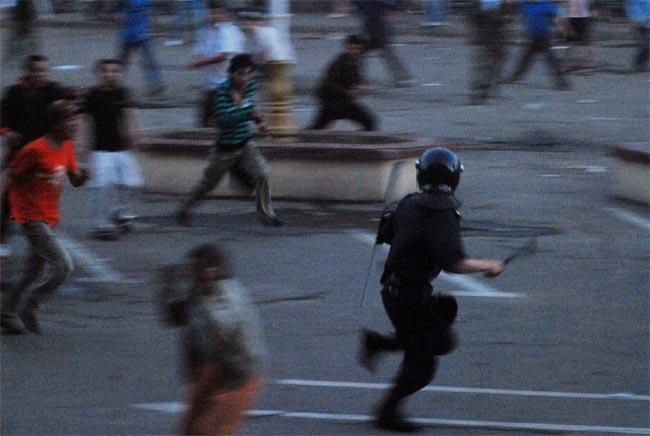
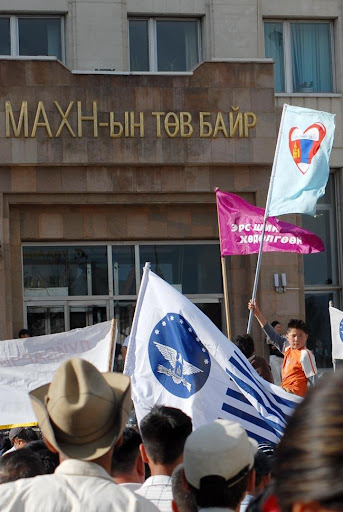
- Clockwise from top left Arson of the MPRP HQ on the night of 1 July; Opposition demonstrations in front of the MPRP headquarters; Clashes between the police and rioters
- Date: 1 July 2008 – 2 July 2008 (1 day)
- Location: Ulaanbaatar, Mongolia
- Caused by: Electoral fraud in the 2008 election; Perceived widespread corruption; Dissatisfaction with the MPRP; Rampant inflation and economic hardship
- Goals: Election boycott; Free and fair election
- Methods: Demonstrations; Civil disobedience; Riots; Arson; Vandalism
- Result: Mongolia's first state of emergency; Headquarters of the Mongolian People's Revolutionary Party destroyed by fire; Five protestors shot dead; Inauguration of the 5th session of the State Great Khural stalled until late August 2008

Parties
Protestors (no central leadership); Supported by: Democratic Party (alleged); Republican Party; Civic Movement Party; New National Party	Government of Mongolia; Ministry of Justice and Internal Affairs; National Police Agency; Internal Troops; Mongolian Armed Forces; Mongolian People's Revolutionary Party

Lead figures
Tsakhiagiin Elbegdorj; Bazarsadyn Jargalsaikhan; Jalbasürengiin Batzandan; Otgonjargalyn Magnai	Sanjiin Bayar; Nambaryn Enkhbayar; Tsendiin Mönkh-Orgil

Number
~8,000 protestors	~3,000 police officers and soldiers

Casualties and losses
220 injured; 9 shot; 5 dead; 700+ arrested	358 police officers and soldiers injured; 63 hospitalized

Casualties
- Deaths: 5
- Injuries: Over 300
- Arrested: Over 700

On 1 July 2008, a riot broke out in Ulaanbaatar, the capital city of Mongolia. The riot was sparked by allegations of fraud surrounding the 2008 parliamentary election, which occurred three days earlier. While initially a peaceful protest, the riot resulted in Mongolia's first state of emergency, which lasted four days, and a military presence (lasting two of those days) was brought into the city to quell the riot. In Mongolia, the event is referred to as the "July 1 riots" (Mongolian: Долоодугаар сарын нэгэний түйвээн, romanized: Doloodugaar sariin negenii tuiveen) or the "Black Day" (Mongolian: Хар өдөр, romanized: Khar ödör).

Five people were killed by the police, and the headquarters of the Mongolian People's Revolutionary Party (which had won the election) was set on fire. Additional suggested causes for the riot include a change to the electoral system, which was not well understood, and an increased division between Mongolia's rich and poor populations.

== Background ==
=== Political climate ===
In the 2004 parliamentary election, the former sole legal communist party, the Mongolian People's Revolutionary Party (MPRP) secured 36 seats in the State Great Khural (parliament), fewer than its previous 72 seat gains. The Motherland Democratic Coalition (MDC), a major opposition coalition between the Democratic Party (DP), the Motherland – Mongolian Democratic New Socialist Party (M-MDNSP) and the Civil Will–Republican Party, received 34 seats while three affiliated independents and were also elected. Additionally, the minor Republican Party won a single parliamentary seat. Minor concerns for election fraud were raised but the elections were overall found to be free and fair by international observers. Two seats were disputed by the MPRP and MDC but were resolved in February 2005 with a by-election and September 2005 via a court decision. Both seats were respectively won by the MPRP and the DP.

Neither major blocs reached the required threshold of 39 seats for a clear majority to govern. Consequently, the MPRP and the MDC made a power-sharing agreement which formed a grand coalition government expected to change its premier every two years. In August 2004, former prime minister, Tsakhiagiin Elbegdorj, was appointed from the MDC to become the 23rd Prime Minister of Mongolia whilst outgoing prime minister and MPRP leader Nambaryn Enkhbayar was elected the Chairman of the State Great Khural (speaker).

In December 2004, due to internal party disputes regarding various issues, the MDC was dissolved by its own leadership which coincided with the resignation of then-leader of the DP, Mendsaikhany Enkhsaikhan, who was succeeded by Radnaasümbereliin Gonchigdorj. Factionalism within the former MDC remained prevalent and lack of clear opposition roles in parliament led to increasing popular disillusionment of the grand coalition.

In the 2005 presidential election, Nambaryn Enkhbayar from the MPRP was overwhelmingly elected the 3rd President of Mongolia in a four-way race, defeating the DP, the M-MDNSP, and the RP candidates with 54% of the popular vote. He was followed by the DP candidate, Mendsaikhany Enkhsaikhan, who received 20% of the vote. By late 2005, five DP lawmakers, including Enkhsaikhan, began to oppose the party line dominated by Gonchigdorj's faction. One of whom, Lamjavyn Gündalai founded his own party, the People's Party, in late 2005.

In mid January 2006, the MPRP exited the coalition government with support from DP dissenters and minor parties. The en masse resignation of 10 MPRP ministers, making up around 80% of the cabinet, led to the appointment of MPRP leader, Miyeegombyn Enkhbold, as the next prime minister. A national unity government was formed by the MPRP, the M-MDNSP, the RP, and DP dissenters; the latter of which later founded the splinter New National Party (NNP) in May 2006. Enkhbold was replaced by Sanjiin Bayar as party chair at the 25th Party Congress in October 2007 and later as prime minister in November 2007 on the premise of weak government and lacking political mandate. Bayar formed another coalition government between the MPRP and various minor parties to "uproot corruption and bureaucracy".

=== 2008 parliamentary elections ===
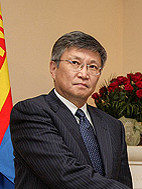
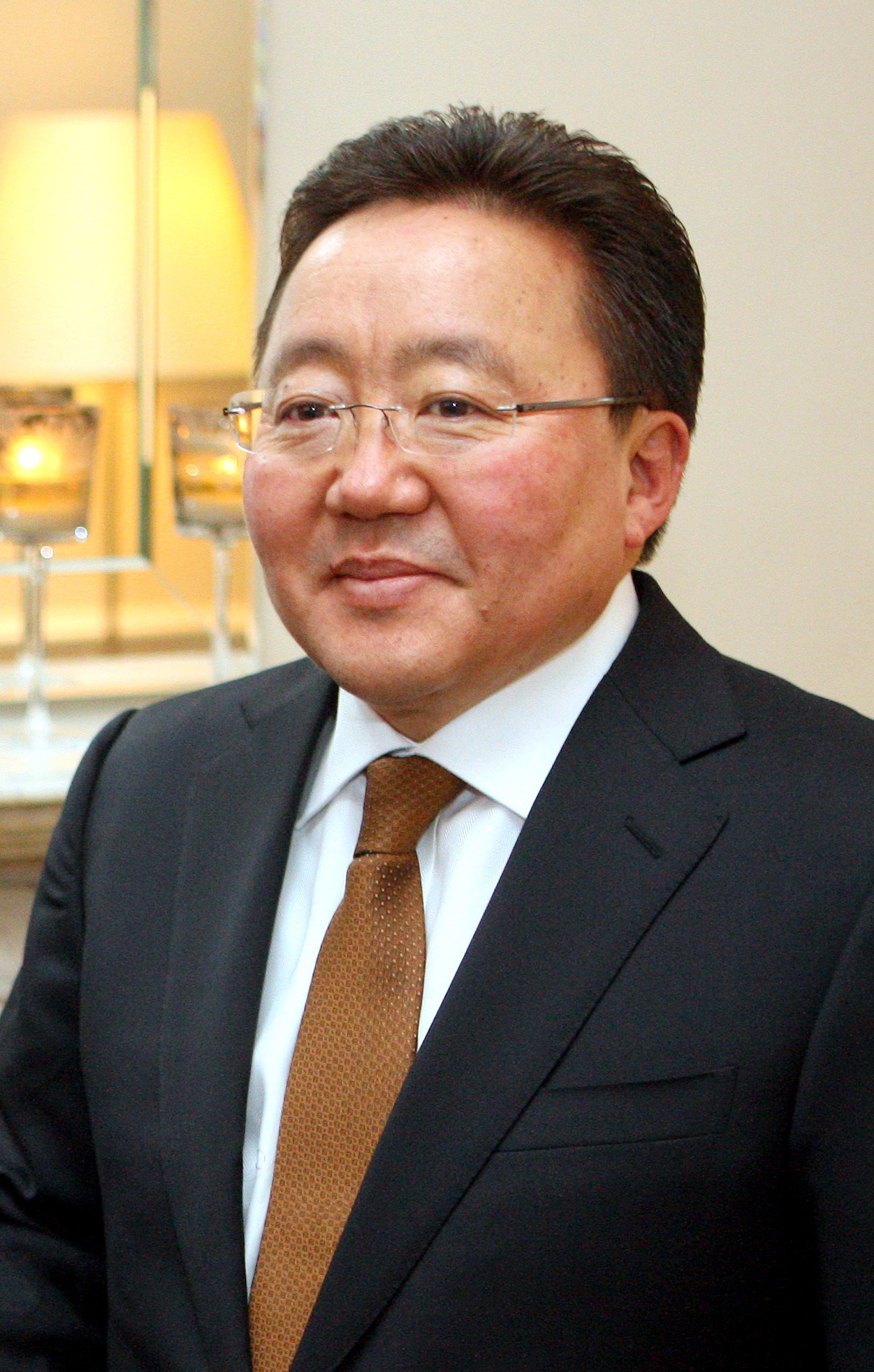
Sanjiin Bayar, leader of the MPRP, and Tsakhiagiin Elbegdorj, leader of the Democratic Party.

Key issues included the development of Mongolia's largely impoverished agriculture industry and mineral deals regarding its booming mining sector. One of the most significant of these long-awaited agreements was the $38 billion Oyu Tolgoi copper deposit project, in partnership with the Canadian company Ivanhoe Mines. While the project promised substantial revenue to Mongolia's GDP, it also raised public fears regarding potential foreign exploitation and environmental damage. Previously in May 2006, protests against the project demanded higher corporate taxes for foreign mining companies. In response, a high windfall tax was enacted, allowing the government to impose taxes of 68% on gold and copper profits. The regulation of foreign involvement in the mining sector remained a subject of controversy, with the MPRP favoring a more state-controlled approach and the DP advocating a more pro-market framework. Both parties promised to use the state revenue from mining on public expenditures.

Prior to the 2008 election, more than 116,000 registered voters were listed twice (under different addresses), the General Election Commission (GEC) affirmed it would be fixed prior to election day. The June 29 elections saw a turnout of 74% and was stated to be "largely free and fair" by international observers. Early results on June 30 saw the MPRP securing 47 seats compared to the DP's 27 seats; the former subsequently declared election victory. The DP and many other opposition parties claimed that the election had been fixed by the MPRP, with some people voting twice. Vote counting was complicated and delayed by the newly re-introduced plurality-at-large system and multi-member constituencies. Previous elections of 2000 and 2004 were conducted using a first-past-the-post voting system with single-member districts.

On 1 July 2008, Republican Party chairman Bazarsadyn Jargalsaikhan, Civic Movement Party leaders Jalbasurengiin Batzandan and Otgonjargalyn Magnai held a press conference regarding the electoral fraud. The three party leaders and DP chairman Tsakhiagiin Elbegdorj called on the people to protest and contest the unfair election results.

== Protests ==
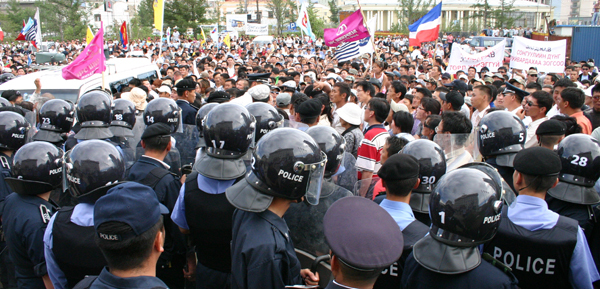
Protestors clashing with the police in front of the MPRP headquarters.

On 1 July, a peaceful gathering started in Sukhbaatar Square, organized by the leaders of opposition parties that took part in the election. Eventually, a large crowd gathered, mainly of young men, surrounding the adjacent MPRP office. The group started throwing rocks at the building and began advancing on it. The National Police Agency responded with tear gas and non-lethal weapons. In the evening, fires were started and looting began. Both the MPRP headquarters and the Central Cultural Palace Building (which houses the National Art Gallery of Mongolia) were set on fire by the crowd, estimated to be in the thousands. Art from the gallery (more than 1,000 pieces) were either "destroyed, damaged, or looted". In search for weapons, a police station was attacked. Looting continued through the night, despite a 10:00 pm – 8:00 am curfew being set in place. Bricks were thrown at a fire engine, and violence in the streets erupted.

"Police will use necessary force to crack down on criminals who are looting private and government property."

— Tsendiin Mönkh-Orgil, Deputy Minister, Minister of. Justice and Internal Affairs

A four-day state of emergency, the first in Mongolia's history, was declared by President Enkhbayar, effective 11:30 pm on 1 July. The state of emergency was placed, and a ban on the sale of alcohol, authorized police to use force to stop the protestors, and prevented television broadcasts outside of those made by state-run stations. The crowds got smaller after the state of emergency was enacted, and the police were able to use additional force to stop the looting. By 2 July, the military was brought into Ulaanbaatar.

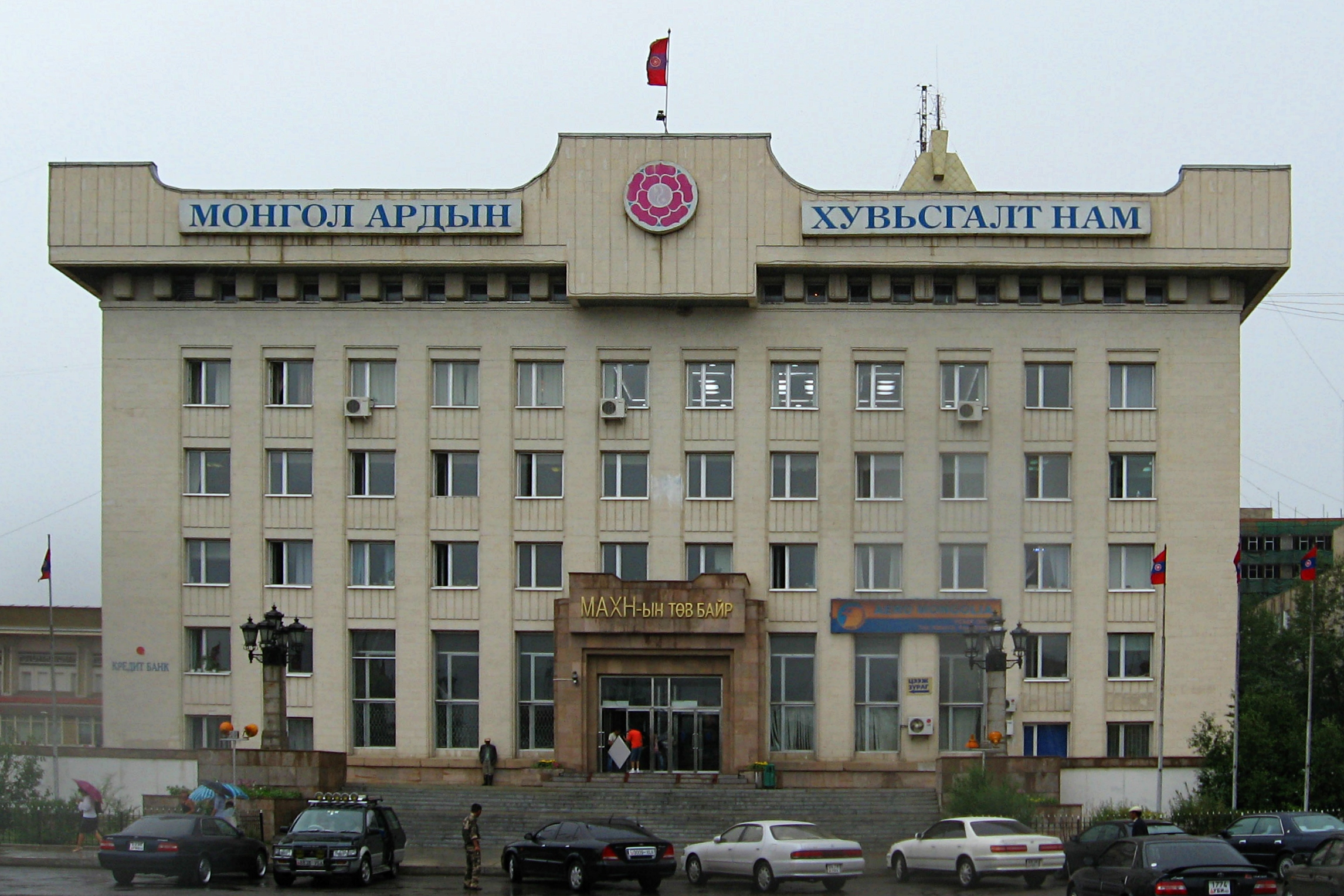
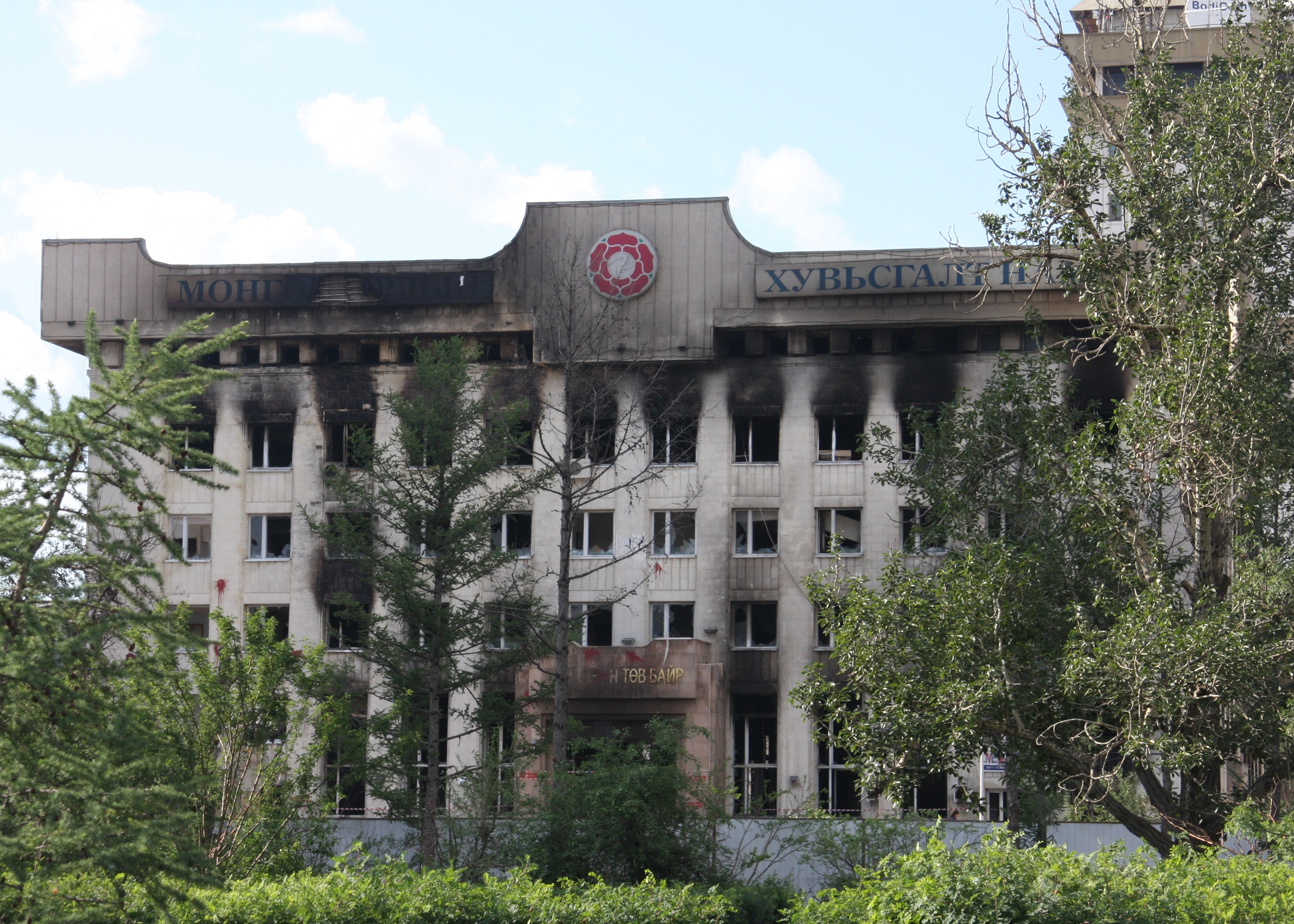
The MPRP Headquarters was destroyed by fire during the protests.

The President upheld the fairness of the elections and promised investigations into the election as required. He also called an emergency national security meeting with the country's prime minister and opposition party leaders. The meeting was broadcast live on privately-run channel Eagle TV, MPRP chairman and prime minister Sanjiin Bayar blamed Democratic chairman Elbegdorj for "misleading people and inciting violence", echoing claims that he had made earlier that day.

== Aftermath ==
By 3 July, the situation had stabilised, with fewer troops patrolling the streets. Five people were killed in the riots, and over 300 people were injured, both civilian and police. Over 700 arrests were made during the riots, on 7 July more than 200 people were still incarcerated. Allegations of torture of prisoners were brought forward, including one person who was erroneously arrested while trying to preserve a piece of art.

On 18 July, in response to the electoral fraud and human rights abuse, DP leader Tsakhiagiin Elbegdorj announced a boycott of the parliamentary plenary session scheduled on 23 July 2008.

According to results published on 14 July, the MPRP won at least 39 seats, the DP won at least 25, at least one seat was going to the Civic Will Party, and three seats were won by independent candidates. However, results from three constituencies (Khentii, Dornod, and Bayangol) were delayed. On 20 August, final results from Khentii were officially published, raising the number of MPRP seats to 45.

Following the month-long boycott, quorum for the opening session was achieved on 28 August 2008. MPRP chairman Sanjiin Bayar was re-appointed as prime minister on 11 September 2008, becoming the first Mongolian prime minister to serve a second term. Bayar was re-elected with 65 lawmakers in favour and 1 against; Elbegdorj being the only one to vote against. In his second tenure, Bayar led a unity government between the MPRP and the DP now led by Norovyn Altankhuyag.

== Analysis ==
Some commentators and analysts suggested the problems may have been exacerbated by a growing rich/poor divide. Luvsandendev Sumati, from the polling organization Sant Maral Foundation is reported as saying that "the outskirts of Ulaanbaatar have a lot of poor and frustrated youngsters who would use any pretext to get to streets and participate in any turmoil". A change from a first-past-the-post election process may have led to a misunderstanding over how a winner is selected.

Then Foreign Minister of Russia Sergey Lavrov described the riots to be inspired from earlier colour revolutions in the former Soviet states. He observed during a press conference in Ankara, "Any questions raised by the opposition must be solved in accordance with constitutional procedures, not in the streets. Everyone was motivated by the sad experience of the so-called ‘color revolutions.’ These revolutionary crusades have to be worked and completed on the basis of the supremacy of law."
