= Nambaryn Enkhbayar =

3rd President of Mongolia from 2005 to 2009

- Намбарын Энхбаяр
- Enkhbayar in 2023

President of Mongolia
- In office 24 June 2005 – 18 June 2009
- Prime Minister: Tsakhiagiin Elbegdorj; Miyeegombyn Enkhbold; Sanjiin Bayar
- Preceded by: Natsagiin Bagabandi
- Succeeded by: Tsakhiagiin Elbegdorj

Prime Minister of Mongolia
- In office 26 July 2000 – 20 August 2004
- President: Natsagiin Bagabandi
- Preceded by: Rinchinnyamyn Amarjargal
- Succeeded by: Tsakhiagiin Elbegdorj

Chairman of the State Great Khural
- In office August 2004 – June 2005
- Preceded by: Sanjbegziin Tömör-Ochir
- Succeeded by: Tsendiin Nyamdorj

Chairman of the Mongolian People's Revolutionary Party (Note: As Secretary General from 1996 to 1997)
- In office 6 June 1997 – 22 November 2005
- Preceded by: Natsagiin Bagabandi
- Succeeded by: Miyeegombyn Enkhbold
- In office 5 October 1996 – 7 February 1997
- Preceded by: Büdragchaagiin Dash-Yondon
- Succeeded by: Natsagiin Bagabandi

Personal details
- Born: 1 June 1958 (age 68) Ulaanbaatar, Mongolia
- Party: Mongolian People's Party (1985–2010; 2021–present)
- Other political affiliations: Mongolian People's Revolutionary Party (2010–2021)
- Spouse: Onongiin Tsolmon
- Children: 4, including Batshugar Enkhbayar
- Education: Maxim Gorky Literature Institute; University of Leeds

Nambaryn Enkhbayar (Mongolian: Намбарын Энхбаяр; born 1 June 1958) is a Mongolian politician who served as the prime minister of Mongolia from 2000 to 2004, as the chairman of the State Great Khural from 2004 to 2005, and as the third president of Mongolia from 2005 to 2009. He is the first person to have held all three top positions in the Mongolian government.

Enkhbayar was also the chairman of the Mongolian People's Revolutionary Party (now Mongolian People's Party) from 1997 to 2005 and the head of the splinter party with the same name, the Mongolian People's Revolutionary Party, from 2010 to 2021. In 2012, he was convicted of corruption and sentenced to four years in prison; he was later pardoned in August 2013.

His eldest son, Enkhbayaryn Batshugar, is a member of the State Great Khural from the Mongolian People's Party.

== Early life and education ==
Nambaryn Enkhbayar was born on 1 June 1958 in Ulaanbaatar, the capital city of the Mongolian People's Republic. He graduated from the 23rd Secondary School in Ulaanbaatar in 1975, during which he learned the Tibetan language. He later earned an undergraduate degree in literature and language studies from the Maxim Gorky Literature Institute in Moscow, the capital of the Soviet Union, in 1980.

He studied an English language and European literature at Leeds University in the United Kingdom between 1985 and 1986. As a young man, he translated the works of the Mongolian poet Mend-Ooyo Gombojav into English. Between 1980 and 1990, Enkhbayar was a translator, editor, head of department, and executive secretary of the Union of Mongolian Writers.

== Political career ==
=== Beginnings (1985–2000) ===
In 1985, Enkhbayar became a member of the Mongolian People's Revolutionary Party (MPRP), which governed Mongolia as its sole legal party since 1921. However, the ruling communist party conceded much of its control over the state during the 1990 Democratic Revolution.

As member of the MPRP, Enkhbayar was first elected to the State Great Khural, the parliament of Mongolia, in the 1992 parliamentary election. In 1992, Mongolia voted to retain the former communist MPRP during its first venture into democratic elections, and Enkhbayar was appointed to serve as the country's Minister of Culture for the cabinet of Puntsagiin Jasrai. He held that post until 1996, when the opposition Democratic Union Coalition ousted the MPRP in the parliamentary elections that year.

Following the election defeat, efforts to reform and renew the party were taken. In late 1996, Enkhbayar became the secretary general of the MPRP, succeeding old guard Büdragchaagiin Dash-Yondon. At the 22th Party Congress, in February 1997, Natsagiin Bagabandi became party chairman while Enkhbayar remained as secretary general. During the congress, it was announced that the party would follow the democratic socialist and centre-left course. Bagabandi went on to successfully run as the MPRP presidential candidate in the 1997 presidential election. Subsequently, president-elect Bagabandi, considered an orthodox member, was relieved from his party duties and succeeded by Enkhbayar as chairman of the MPRP in June 1997.

On 20 August 1997, Enkhbayar was elected to fill Bagabandi's vacated seat in a by-election at the 21st constituency in Zavkhan Province. As party chairman, Enkhbayar became the leader of the MPRP minority caucus (leader of the Opposition) throughout his parliamentary term.

=== Prime minister (2000–2004) ===
In the 2000 parliamentary elections, the MPRP won 72 out of the 76 seats in the State Great Khural, beating the now opposition Democratic Union and its constituent parties which only managed to secure a single seat. At the age of 42, party chairman Enkhbayar was appointed the Prime Minister of Mongolia by the MPRP-controlled legislature on 26 July 2000. Nomination of Enkhbayar was delayed by a week because of president Bagabandi.

Prior to the election, in 1999, Mongolia was hit by a summer drought and its worst winter in 30 years. The harsh winter, locally known as zud, resulted in severe food shortages and loss of 2.5 million livestock, negatively impacting the livelihoods of thousands of nomadic families. During the election campaign, Enkhbayar pledged to seek more state assistance for impoverished and disadvantaged groups; healthcare reform; and slowed privatization of Mongolia's 17 large state-owned enterprises.

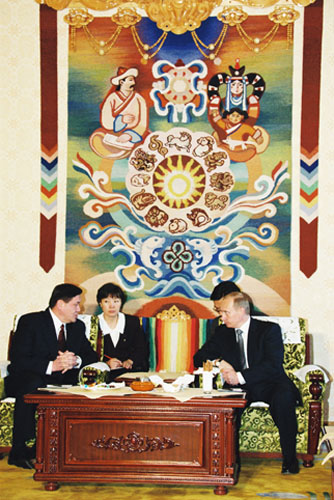
Prime Minister Enkhbayar with Russian President Vladimir Putin, November 2000

Enkhbayar was critical of the rapid economic liberalization that took place between 1996 and 2000, which he believed was what increased social hardship. During the country's early economic transition, poverty rates reached its highest since 1991 and the welfare system collapsed primarily due to the previous governments' austerity.

As party chair, Enkhbayar opted for a centre-left "Third Way" orientation for the ex-communist MPRP. Due to his stances, he was alikened to then-British Prime Minister Tony Blair and described as the "Blair of the Steppes" by international media outlets. Enkhbayar was re-elected as chairman at the 23rd Party Congress in February 2001. Institutional clashes between the prime minister and the president, prevalent since Bagabandi's presidency, coincided with the party politics between orthodox and progressive wings in the MPRP.

In January 2001, Enkhbayar's cabinet initiated the ambitious Millennium Road (Мянганы зам) project to mark the country's new millenium. The road project, estimated to be over 2,400 kilometres long, was to connect the western and easternmost points and all 21 provinces to Ulaanbaatar. However, due to the high costs, the road wasn't initially fully surfaced over its full length. The grand infrastructure project was fully completed in 2022.

During Enkhbayar's time as prime minister, extensive talks regarding Mongolia's debt to the former Soviet Union were made with Russia. The Soviet-era debt was considered somewhat controversial due to the country's history of supplying raw materials, priced almost free, to the Soviet Union. High-profile visits were made between the two sides in 2000 (by Russian President Vladimir Putin), 2002 (by Russian Prime Minister Mikhail Kasyanov), and 2003 (by Nambaryn Enkhbayar). In late 2003, the debt, estimated to be around USD$11 billion, was eliminated and reduced to a negotiated payment of USD$300 million to resolve trade ties with Russia and to strengthen investor confidence.

Enkhbayar and his spouse, Onongiin Tsolmon, being greeted by Indian Prime Minister Atal Bihari Vajpayee in New Delhi, January 2004

At the start of Enkhbayar's term, real GDP growth remained at 1% in 2000 and 2001, mainly due to the continued severe weather conditions between 1999 and 2002. The agricultural sector, an important part of the Mongolian economy, saw the total livestock population shrinking by almost 30 percent (estimated 11 million livestock). Urban capacity of Ulaanbaatar was also pressured due to increased rural-urban migration following the zuds. Real GDP growth rose to 3.9% in 2002, 5.0% in 2003, and 10.6% in 2004. The growth has been largely attributed to the international exposure of Mongolia's mining sector.

=== Speaker of Parliament (2004–2005) ===
In the 2004 parliamentary election, the MPRP lost its majority to opposition Motherland Democratic Coalition, a coalition between the Democratic Party and the Motherland Party. Due to the election result, neither the coalition or the MPRP had the enough majority to form a government. A grand coalition government was formed between the two parties with Tsakhiagiin Elbegdorj as prime minister and outgoing premier Enkhbayar as the chairman of the State Great Khural. On 13 August 2004, Enkhbayar was relieved and elected as speaker. His speakership lasted for less than a year until his candidacy for the upcoming presidential race in 2005.

== Presidency (2005–2009) ==
On 22 May 2005, he won the 2005 presidential election with 54% of the ballot, slightly above the majority vote requirement of 50% to prevent a run-off. Enkhbayar defeated his three opponent candidates with a landslide victory. Later on 24 June 2005, Enkhbayar was inaugurated as the third President of Mongolia, becoming the first Mongolian to serve in the country's top three positions, the premiership, speakership, and presidency.

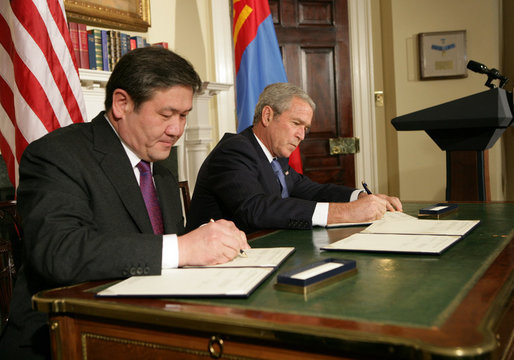
Nambaryn Enkhbayar and U.S. President George W. Bush signing the MCC Agreement in October 2007

During his tenure, he welcomed the U.S. President George W. Bush during his official visit to Mongolia, the first-ever visit of a sitting U.S president to the country. Mongolia received US$285 million aid from the United States' Millennium Challenge Corporation (MCC) which United States President George W. Bush signed with Enkhbayar in 2007.

In the 2008 parliamentary elections, on 29 June, preliminary results showed the MPRP with a majority. Allegations of electoral fraud surrounding the election were insisted by opposition leaders Tsakhiagiin Elbegdorj, Bazarsadyn Jargalsaikhan, Jalbasurengiin Batzandan, and Otgonjargalyn Magnai on 1 July 2008. The initial peaceful demonstrations against electoral fraud, amplified by opposition leaders, soon turned into a riot which locally came to be known as the July 1 riot.

President Enkhbayar declared Mongolia's first state of emergency, lasting four days, effective 11:30 pm on 1 July. Consequently, the Mongolian military was brought into the city to quell the riot. Five people were killed by the police, over 300 people were injured, the headquarters of the ruling MPRP was set on fire, and many nearby shops and galleries were looted by rioters. President Enkhbayar and then prime minister Sanjiin Bayar faced intense backlash from the public due to allegations of human rights abuse and electoral fraud. On 23 July 2008, the opening of the newly-elected State Great Khural was boycotted by opposition lawmakers, causing the plenary session to be delayed. After a month of boycott, the incoming parliament was sworn in on 28 August, when the quorum was fulfilled.

Enkhbayar ran for a second presidential term in the 2009 presidential election. However, he was defeated by Tsakhiagiin Elbegdorj of the rival Democratic Party on 24 May 2009. Elbegdorj won 51.21% of total votes while Enkhbayar got 47.41%.

== Post-presidency (since 2009) ==
=== Party split ===
In 2010, Enkhbayar established a political party and named it the Mongolian People's Revolutionary Party. The party received approval to use the previous name of the Mongolian People's Party (MPP) from the Supreme Court of Mongolia on 26 June 2011. Enkhbayar himself became the first and only chairman of his party. The MPRP, for much of its decade-long existence, was the primary third-party force and key anti-establishment party up until 2021, when the party decided to merge back into the MPP during its hundred year anniversary. In May 2017, the MPRP nominated Enkhbayar for the 2017 presidential election, but the General Election Commission refused to register him, citing his conviction. On 29 April 2021, Enkhbayar and MPP chairman Ukhnaagiin Khürelsükh signed an agreement merging the MPRP into the MPP, and the MPRP was removed from the state register of parties on 28 May 2021.

=== Corruption convictions ===
The Independent Authority Against Corruption (IAAC) arrested Enkhbayar at the dawn of 13 April 2012. The IAAC stated that it arrested Enkhbayar for questioning in a graft case involving the illegal privatization of a government-owned hotel because he never showed up for questioning.

Over 1,000 members of his party, the MPRP, and Enkhbayar's supporters participated in party's organized demonstration demanding Enkhbayar's release on the same day of his arrest. On 4 May 2012, Enkhbayar announced a dry hunger strike demanding his release. He lost around 12 kilograms in 16 days. Amnesty International issued a statement demanding the Mongolian authority to respect human rights of Enkhbayar compatible to international standards. United Nations Secretary-General Ban Ki-moon made a phone call to then-President Tsakhiagiin Elbegdorj expressing concern over Enkhbayar's health. Enkhbayar was released on bail on 14 May 2012. United States Senator Dianne Feinstein expressed to the U.S.Senate her pleasure for Enkhbayar's release on bail and said "For any democracy, due process and the rule of law are essential."

On 8 June 2012, the General Election Commission (GEC) refused to register Enkhbayar as a candidate for the 2012 parliamentary elections in the MPRP party list listed as number one. It stated that the official documents sent from the Prosecutor's Office and Sükhbaatar District Court of Ulaanbaatar required the rejection of Enkhbayar's application pending the case. However, Enkhbayar and his lawyers argue that the incumbent president, Elbegdorj, who took office in 2009, engineered the corruption case to keep him from running in the coming elections. They claim that the court gave them insufficient time to review the prosecutors' evidence and witness statements. The election authorities' denial of Enkhbayar's candidacy on 6 June, they say, violates his constitutional right to be considered innocent until proven guilty. According to a US-based independent trial observer, the five charges leveled against Enkhbayar seem overblown and unsubstantiated. One accuses him of misappropriating TV equipment that was intended for a Buddhist monastery. Another alleges that he illegally shipped eight copies of his autobiography to South Korea on a government plane.

On 2 August 2012, after a three-day trial, Sukhbaatar District Court convicted Enkhbayar of corruption and sentenced to seven years of imprisonment, three of which was pardoned and then gave four years prison term and fined with over MNT 1.7 billion for misusing state properties and government power. Enkhbayar's sentence was reduced to two and a half year prison term without the fine by the Supreme Court, the highest court in Mongolia.

On 1 August 2013, President of Mongolia Tsakhiagiin Elbegdorj issued a decree to pardon Enkhbayar thus releasing him from the rest of his jail term effective on the decree date.

=== Later activities ===
Enkhbayar with Indian Vice President Jagdeep Dhankhar during his visit to India organized by the Indian Council for Cultural Relations in August 2023

In August 2022, Enkhbayar travelled to the Vatican as the special envoy of President Ukhnaagiin Khürelsükh and presented the president's invitation to Pope Francis, who received him in audience on 24 August 2022. Francis accepted the invitation and visited Mongolia from 31 August to 4 September 2023, the first papal visit to the country.

In March 2025, the Government decided to appoint Enkhbayar and other former senior officials as unpaid ambassadors-at-large to advise on its major development projects, with Enkhbayar taking on the Kharkhorum project. In June 2025, the newly created Kharkhorum City Council, established under a January 2025 law to govern the planned new city of Kharkhorum in the Orkhon Valley, elected him as its chairman at its first session.

On 24 April 2026, he was appointed a member of the International Advisory Committee of the Institute for Sustainable Development Goals at Tsinghua University in Beijing.

== List of high government/party positions ==
- Chairman of the Mongolian People's Revolutionary Party (2010–2021)
- President of Mongolia (2005–2009)
- Chairman of the State Great Khural (2004–2005)
- Prime Minister of Mongolia (2000–2004)
- Chairman of the Mongolian People's Revolutionary Party (1997–2005)
- Secretary General of the Mongolian People's Revolutionary Party (1996–1997)
- Minister of Culture (1992–1996)
- Member of the State Great Khural (1992–1996; 1997–2000; 2000–2004; 2004–2005)

== Personal life ==
He has been married to Onongiin Tsolmon since 1987, and they have four children. His eldest son, Enkhbayaryn Batshugar, is a banker and has been an MPP member of the State Great Khural since 2021.

=== Sports ===
Enkhbayar climbed the highest peak in Mongolia, Khüiten Peak, with mountaineers of the Mongolian Mountaineering Federation and the Nepal Mountaineering Association on 23 June 2011.

=== Religion ===
Enkhbayar is a follower of Tibetan Buddhism. He translated several Buddhist texts into Mongolian.

== Awards and honors ==
=== State and regional awards ===
- Russia: Medal of Pushkin, by presidential decree of 31 October 2007, presented by President Dmitry Medvedev in Moscow on 16 May 2008
- Russia, Kemerovo Oblast: Order "Key of Friendship" (gold), presented by Governor Aman Tuleyev in Kemerovo, July 2003
- Kazakhstan: Commemorative medal for the 30th anniversary of the independence of Kazakhstan, presented by the Kazakh ambassador in Ulaanbaatar on 23 February 2022

=== Honorary degrees ===
Country	Institution	Degree	Date
Russia	Buryat State University	Honorary doctorate	4 December 2006
Japan	Waseda University	Doctor of Laws (honoris causa)	28 February 2007
South Korea	Yonsei University	Honorary doctorate in political science	30 May 2007
Russia	Maxim Gorky Literature Institute	Honorary doctorate	June 2008
Mongolia	Mongolian University of Science and Technology	Honorary doctorate	2009

=== Other honors ===
- U Thant Peace Award, presented by Sri Chinmoy in Ulaanbaatar on 22 May 2007

== Notes ==
Party political offices
Preceded by Büdragchaagiin Dash-Yondon	Secretary General of the Mongolian People's Revolutionary Party; 1996–1997	Succeeded by Natsagiin Bagabandi
Preceded by Natsagiin Bagabandi	Chairman of the Mongolian People's Revolutionary Party; 1997–2005	Succeeded by Miyeegombyn Enkhbold
Political offices
Preceded by Rinchinnyamyn Amarjargal	Prime Minister of Mongolia; 2000–2004	Succeeded by Tsakhiagiin Elbegdorj
Preceded by Natsagiin Bagabandi	President of Mongolia; 2005–2009	Succeeded by Tsakhiagiin Elbegdorj
