= Motherland Democratic Coalition =

Political party alliance in Mongolia

Motherland Democratic Coalition Эх орон–Ардчилал Эвсэл
- Abbreviation: MDC (English); ЭОАЭ (Mongolian)
- Chairperson: Tsakhiagiin Elbegdorj
- Founded: 16 July 2003
- Dissolved: 19 December 2004
- Ideology: Big tent Factions: Conservatism; Liberalism
- Political position: Centre-right
- Coalition parties: Democratic Party; Motherland – Mongolian Democratic New Socialist Party; Civil Will–Republican Party
- Colors: Blue
- Slogan: Шинэ Сонголт ("New Choice")
- State Great Khural (2004–2008): 34 / 76

Party flag
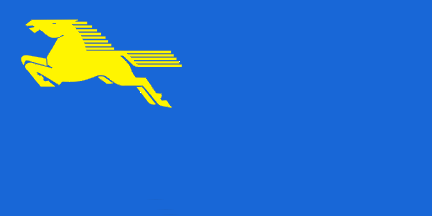
- Flag of the Democratic Party Flag of the Motherland Party

Motherland Democratic Coalition (Mongolian: Эх орон–Ардчилал эвсэл, romanized: Ekh oron–Ardchilal evsel) was a coalition of political parties in Mongolia for the 2004 parliamentary elections.

It was dissolved on 19 December 2004, with the exit of the Motherland–Mongolian Democratic New Socialist Party from the coalition.

== History ==
=== Background ===
In the 2000 parliamentary election, the ex-communist Mongolian People's Revolutionary Party (MPRP) won a supermajority of 72 out of 76 seats in the State Great Khural. Despite winning 50 seats in the 1996 election, the Democratic Union Coalition, due to party infighting and unstable governance, won a single seat. The Motherland–Mongolian Democratic New Socialist Party (M–MNDSP) and the Civil Will Party each also won a single seat.

In the aftermath of the electoral wipeout, the former Democratic Union Coalition parties merged and founded the Democratic Party (DP) in December 2000.

=== Founding ===
In May 2003, an alliance agreement was reached between the M–MNDSP and the DP, both agreeing to stage a joint bid to secure more seats in the upcoming 2004 elections. The Civil Will–Republican Party (CWRP), after securing the mandate of 67% of its members in June, partnered with the M–MNDSP and the DP.

On 16 July 2003, the Motherland Democratic Coalition was formed by the three parliamentary opposition parties.

Party name	Abbr.	Leader	Position	Ideology
Democratic Party Ардчилсан Нам Ardchilsan Nam	DP; АН	Tsakhiagiin Elbegdorj	Centre-right	Liberal conservatism
Motherland–Mongolian Democratic New Socialist Party Эх орон–Монголын Ардчилсан Шинэ Социалист Нам Ekh oron–Mongolyn Ardchilsan Shine Sotsialist Nam	M–MNDSP; Э–МАШСН	Badarchiin Erdenebat	Centre-left	Social democracy
Civil Will–Republican Party Иргэний Зориг–Бүгд Найрамдах Нам Irgenii Zorig–Bügd Nairamdakh Nam	CW–RP; ИЗ–БНН	Sanjaasürengiin Oyuun	Centre	Liberalism

The Republican Party, which merged with the Civil Will Party in 2002, split off and was officially registered as a legitimate political party by the Supreme Court on April 5. The party ran on an independent platform under its chairman, Bazarsadyn Jargalsaikhan.

=== 2004 parliamentary election ===
The MDC won 34 out of the 76 seats in the State Great Khural, whilst the ruling MPRP lost half of its seats to the opposition.

Neither the MPRP nor the coalition met the required threshold of 39 seats for a clear majority. A coalition government led by the MDC and Democratic chairman Tsakhiagiin Elbegdorj was formed between the MPRP and MDC upon signing a memorandum of understanding.

Party	Seats
Democratic Party	25
Motherland–Mongolian Democratic New Socialist Party	7
Civil Will–Republican Party	2
Total	34
Source: gogo.mn, Global International

By-elections were held for the 2 vacant, disputed seats between the DP and the MPRP. Both parties won the by-elections in February 2005, increasing DP seats from 25 to 26 and MPRP seats from 36 to 37.

=== Dissolution ===
State Great Khural before and after the dissolution of the MDC

On 19 December 2004, the MDC was dissolved by its own party leaders due to internal DP disputes and a split between the coalition leaders. The dissolution of the MDC ultimately led to the creation of 2 splinter parties called the New National Party and the People's Party, the revival of the Mongolian Social Democratic Party, an MPRP landslide victory in the 2005 presidential election, and the collapse of the DP-led coalition government in 2006.

== Electoral history ==
=== State Great Khural elections ===
Election	Party leader	Votes	%	Seats	+/–	Position	Government
2004	Tsakhiagiin Elbegdorj	464,479	44.85%	34 / 76	▲35	▲2nd	Coalition government
