= 2004 Mongolian parliamentary election =

- 27 June 2004
- All 76 seats in the State Great Khural; 39 seats needed for a majority
- Turnout: 81.84% (▼0.60 pp)
Party	Leader	Vote %	Seats	+/–
MPRP	Nambaryn Enkhbayar	48.87	37	−35
MDC	Tsakhiagiin Elbegdorj	44.90	35	+32
Republican	Bazarsadyn Jargalsaikhan	1.38	1	+1
Independents	–	3.41	3	+2
This lists parties that won seats. See the complete results below.
Results by constituency
Prime Minister before	Prime Minister after
Nambaryn Enkhbayar; MPRP	Tsakhiagiin Elbegdorj; Democratic Party

Parliamentary elections were held in Mongolia on 27 June 2004. Despite losing half of its seats to the opposition that was wiped out in the 2000 parliamentary election, the Mongolian People's Revolutionary Party (MPRP) won 36 out of 76 seats and remained as the largest party in the State Great Khural.

The Motherland Democratic Coalition (MDC), led by the newly founded Democratic Party (DP), won 34 out of 76 seats in the State Great Khural but failed to meet the threshold for a majority rule. 2 seats were disputed between the two parties, leaving them vacant until by-elections were held. A hung parliament was ultimately convened on 27 July 2004, and soon later a coalition government, headed by MDC chairman Tsakhiagiin Elbegdorj, was formed.

In the February 2005 by-election, the MPRP won a single seat in the 59th constituency. The DP won a single seat in the 24th constituency after a long court procedure in September 2005.

== Background ==
In the previous parliamentary elections in 2000, the MPRP won 72 of the 76 seats in the State Great Khural. The opposition Democratic Union, comprising four parties that held a parliamentary majority with 50 seats from 1996 to 2000, suffered a major setback, winning only a single seat. Independent politician Lamjavyn Gündalai, the Motherland–Mongolian Democratic New Socialist Party (M–MNDSP), and the Civil Will Party also won one seat each.

The opposition was fractured into twelve political parties and three coalitions that altogether nominated 560 candidates. No other party than the MPRP had obtained more than one seat in parliament.

The electoral wipeout of the Democratic Union is attributed to their chaotic four years in government, political infighting, and the assassination of democratic revolutionary Sanjaasürengiin Zorig. The latter, which led to the formation of a splinter Civil Will Party led by his sister, Sanjaasürengiin Oyun.

On 6 December 2000, the five former member parties of the Democratic Union merged and established the Democratic Party of Mongolia (DP). Independent MP Gundalai joined the DP in late 2000, increasing the number of Democratic seats from 1 to 2. The DP founded the Motherland Democratic Coalition with the M–MNDSP in May 2003. The Civil Will–Republican Party, a merger of the Civil Will Party and the Republican Party, would join the coalition later in July 2003.

== Electoral system ==
The members of the State Great Khural were elected from single-seat constituencies by a plurality voting method. The previous parliamentary elections of 1996 and 2000 were both held under the same system.

Of the 76 seats, 20 were elected from the capital city, Ulaanbaatar, and the other 56 were elected from the 21 aimags of Mongolia.

=== Timetable ===
The election timetable was approved by the General Election Commission (GEC) on 8 April, four days before the date of the election was announced.

12 April	Announcement of the election date
22 April	Deadline for parties to submit intention to participate
27 April–17 May	Parties nominate candidates
27 May	The GEC issues candidate cards
27 May–25 June	Election campaign period
20 June	Deadline for the conduct of public opinion polling
28 June	Polling day (from 7am until 10pm)

== Contesting parties ==
=== Pre-election composition ===
Party	Seats
Mongolian People's Revolutionary Party	72
Democratic Party	2
Motherland–Mongolian Democratic New Socialist Party	1
Civil Will–Republican Party	1
Total	76
Source: State Great Khural

244 candidates were officially registered by the GEC for the election, of whom 15 were independents and 229 were running from 6 political parties and 1 coalition.

Party	Candidates
Mongolian People's Revolutionary Party	76
Motherland Democratic Coalition (Note: Democratic Party, Motherland – Mongolian Democratic New Socialist Party, Civil Will–Republican Party)	76
Mongolian Party of National Unity	23
Republican Party	35
Mongolian Traditional United Party	9
Mongolian Green Party	5
Mongolian Liberal Party	5
Independents	15
Total	244

== Opinion polls ==
Polling firm	Fieldwork date	Sample size	MPRP	M-DC	CW–RP	Other	Ind.	None	Und./NA/ DK
Sant Maral	18–25 May 2003	1,662	39	29	8	2	14	–	8
IRI	3 Jun 2003	1,000	35	31	6	1	–	1	25
	16 Jul 2003	CW–RP joins the M-DC							
IRI	3 Aug 2003	1,000	35	37		1	–	1	26
Sant Maral	24 Oct – 1 Nov 2003	1,703	35	39		2	14	–	9
IRI	3 Nov 2003	1,000	45	38		1	–	1	17
Sant Maral	4–12 Mar 2004	1,663	49	29		2	13	–	7
Sant Maral	30 May – 7 Jun 2004	2,170	47	36		4	5	–	8
2004 election	27 Jun 2004	–	48.8	44.9		2.8	3.5	–	–

== Results ==
The Mongolian People's Revolutionary Party's supermajority was reduced to 36 seats in the June 2004 elections. The MPRP lost its majority but still remained the largest plurality in parliament. The opposition Motherland Democratic Coalition, comprising three parliamentary opposition parties, won 34 seats. In addition, three independents and one Republican Party member were elected to the State Great Khural. A hung parliament was convened on 27 July 2004, when 74 members of parliament-elect were sworn in. Election irregularities were detected in one poll in the 24th constituency and in two polls in the 59th constituency, leaving two seats vacant throughout much of 2004 and 2005.

Re-runs were held at the 59th constituency on 27 February 2005, which affirmed the election of the MPRP candidate, Jügderdemidiin Gürragchaa. In the 24th constituency, a long legal battle between the two sides occurred. On 26 September 2005, the Supreme Court of Mongolia issued a decision on the election dispute, rejecting the MPRP representative's complaint to annul the results, in which the Democratic Party candidate won. The DP candidate, Zandaakhüügiin Enkhbold, was sworn in on 3 October 2005, when the parliamentary autumn session convened.

Party or alliance		Votes	%	Seats	+/–
Mongolian People's Revolutionary Party		523,677	48.87	37	–35
Motherland Democratic Coalition	Democratic Party	481,166	44.90	26	New
Motherland Democratic Coalition	Motherland–Mongolian Democratic New Socialist Party	481,166	44.90	7	+6
Motherland Democratic Coalition	Civil Will–Republican Party	481,166	44.90	2	+1
Motherland Democratic Coalition	Total	481,166	44.90	35	New
Republican Party		14,819	1.38	1	+1
Mongolian Traditional United Party		6,097	0.57	0	New
Mongolian Party of National Unity		5,097	0.48	0	New
Mongolian Green Party		2,153	0.20	0	–
Mongolian Liberal Party		2,080	0.19	0	New
Independents		36,543	3.41	3	+2
Total		1,071,632	100.00	76	0
Valid votes		1,073,471	98.55		
Invalid/blank votes		15,845	1.45		
Total votes		1,089,316	100.00		
Registered voters/turnout		1,330,996	81.84		
Source: General Election Commission

=== Results by constituency ===
2004 Mongolian parliamentary election results by constituency
Province	Constituency	MPRP	MDC	RP	MTUP	MPNU	MGP	MLP	Ind.	Valid	Invalid	Electorate
Arkhangai	1	5,961	10,107			48				16,125	301	19,411
Arkhangai	2	6,049	8,309							14,368	234	17,713
Arkhangai	3	6,302	6,883							13,200	318	16,152
Bayan-Ölgii	4	6,729	8,203	116						15,065	284	19,503
Bayan-Ölgii	5	6,118	7,199		65				235	13,654	355	15,516
Bayan-Ölgii	6	7,146	8,324							15,476	324	17,169
Bayankhongor	7	8,104	5,464							13,584	239	17,622
Bayankhongor	8	5,461	6,205	39		54	80			11,847	173	13,840
Bayankhongor	9	5,084	6,704							11,798	239	13,545
Bulgan	10	9,031	5,147							14,191	282	17,415
Bulgan	11	8,569	4,156							12,730	163	15,527
Govi-Altai	12	9,229	5,649							14,892	177	16,355
Govi-Altai	13	7,812	6,293			118				14,235	192	16,460
Govisümber and Dornogovi	14	8,785	4,687	109						13,603	223	16,616
Govisümber and Dornogovi	15	9,724	7,209		441					17,395	285	21,071
Dornod	16	4,087	3,417						543	8,054	88	9,766
Dornod	17	6,245	7,208	54						13,519	172	16,297
Dornod	18	5,088	5,195						912	11,195	179	13,779
Dundgovi	19	7,136	5,544							12,692	217	15,467
Dundgovi	20	4,216	6,298			54				10,574	143	12,196
Zavkhan	21	5,904	6,051							11,961	118	14,049
Zavkhan	22	7,575	4,753							12,335	179	14,293
Zavkhan	23	3,626	1,131	164					4,570; 3,812	13,311	153	14,856
Övörkhangai	24 (Note: Election results disputed by the MPRP until September 2005)	6,236	6,288							12,542	222	16,591
Övörkhangai	25	3,633	7,773			134				11,544	151	14,321
Övörkhangai	26	7,170	4,698							11,875	294	14,460
Övörkhangai	27	6,544	7,826							14,380	362	17,150
Ömnögovi	28	5,381	6,922							12,324	75	14,131
Ömnögovi	29	5,429	5,774							11,214	161	13,003
Sükhbaatar	30	10,129	2,808							12,953	208	14,873
Sükhbaatar	31	9,003	6,142			66				15,233	314	16,863
Selenge	32	6,555	8,500	126		54				15,243	207	18,378
Selenge	33	7,503	6,853							14,369	261	18,494
Selenge	34	6,205	6,241	37		46				12,538	214	15,327
Töv	35	6,328	4,954	278						11,575	194	15,615
Töv	36	3,985	3,106		189				561	7,846	111	10,599
Töv	37	5,307	3,697	78						9,086	155	12,786
Töv	38	5,780	3,267	233						9,293	171	12,368
Uvs	39	7,497	3,427							10,941	248	14,069
Uvs	40	7,206	5,433				1,282			13,941	290	16,075
Uvs	41	6,676	5,952							12,650	297	14,157
Khovd	42	4,996	4,192						2,326	11,543	126	13,780
Khovd	43	7,758	5,691	48						13,472	270	15,139
Khovd	44	6,946	6,188		657					13,791	308	15,181
Khövsgöl	45	4,526	7,984							12,521	192	16,086
Khövsgöl	46	6,307	6,786							13,104	174	16,095
Khövsgöl	47	5,810	8,507	59		36				14,422	181	17,664
Khövsgöl	48	5,901	10,015	45						15,980	243	19,641
Khentii	49	5,289	5,022							10,337	175	12,395
Khentii	50	6,343	5,744							12,097	194	14,448
Khentii	51	4,748	4,569							9,334	170	11,105
Darkhan-Uul	52	5,963	7,406			96				13,482	170	17,103
Darkhan-Uul	53	4,454	7,700	72		39				12,267	131	15,463
Darkhan-Uul	54	5,853	6,242			72				12,176	171	15,756
Orkhon	55	8,141	2,213	114	158	52			9,251; 90	20,956	285	26,590
Orkhon	56	6,988	5,970	424		44	321			13,748	186	17,118
Ulaanbaatar	57	9,429	9,344	603	872				1,005	21,269	274	26,924
Ulaanbaatar	58	8,521	11,073	473		3,432				23,517	227	30,431
Ulaanbaatar	59 (Note: Irregularities detected at the 18th and 22nd election poll, by-election was held for the 18th poll in February 2005)	11,773	10,399	415		96		483	158; 148	23,476	266	33,691
Ulaanbaatar	60	7,133	9,789	218		80			5,111; 136	22,492	340	27,170
Ulaanbaatar	61	7,469	6,605	117		97		93		14,397	120	18,532
Ulaanbaatar	62	11,405	9,525	437		169				21,562	273	27,869
Ulaanbaatar	63	5,530	6,365	355		70				12,326	119	15,840
Ulaanbaatar	64	6,497	1,721	223					7,685	16,133	103	19,664
Ulaanbaatar	65	8,273	6,839	259						15,377	218	20,061
Ulaanbaatar	66	5,602	5,948	252						11,815	114	14,328
Ulaanbaatar	67	17,238	8,488	389	657		81			26,863	236	34,199
Ulaanbaatar	68	13,771	6,438	1,435		157				21,813	281	29,359
Ulaanbaatar	69	5,668	8,112	392				80		14,262	110	18,612
Ulaanbaatar	70	5,023	2,495	5,849						13,377	216	17,371
Ulaanbaatar	71	3,851	5,931	294						10,081	85	12,454
Ulaanbaatar	72	7,250	8,943	422				268		16,911	197	22,101
Ulaanbaatar	73	7,433	10,513		2,134		389			20,487	252	28,081
Ulaanbaatar	74	6,243	3,777	196				1,156		11,377	131	14,242
Ulaanbaatar	75	5,896	4,047	134		31				10,115	90	13,422
Ulaanbaatar	76	9,101	10,788	360	924	52				21,240	244	29,203
Total		523,677	481,166	14,819	6,097	5,097	2,153	2,080	36,543	1,073,471	15,845	1,330,996
