= Civil Will–Republican Party =

Political party in Mongolia (2002–2006)

Civil Will–Republican Party Иргэний Зориг–Бүгд Найрамдах Нам
- Abbreviation: CW–RP (English); ИЗ–БНН (Mongolian)
- Chairperson: Sanjaasürengiin Oyuun
- Founded: 22 February 2002
- Dissolved: 15 January 2006
- Merger of: Civil Will Party; Republican Party
- Succeeded by: Civil Will Party
- Headquarters: Ulaanbaatar
- Ideology: Big tent Economic liberalism
- Political position: Centre to Centre-right
- National affiliation: Motherland Democratic Coalition (2003–2004)
- State Great Khural (2004–2006): 2 / 76

Party flag
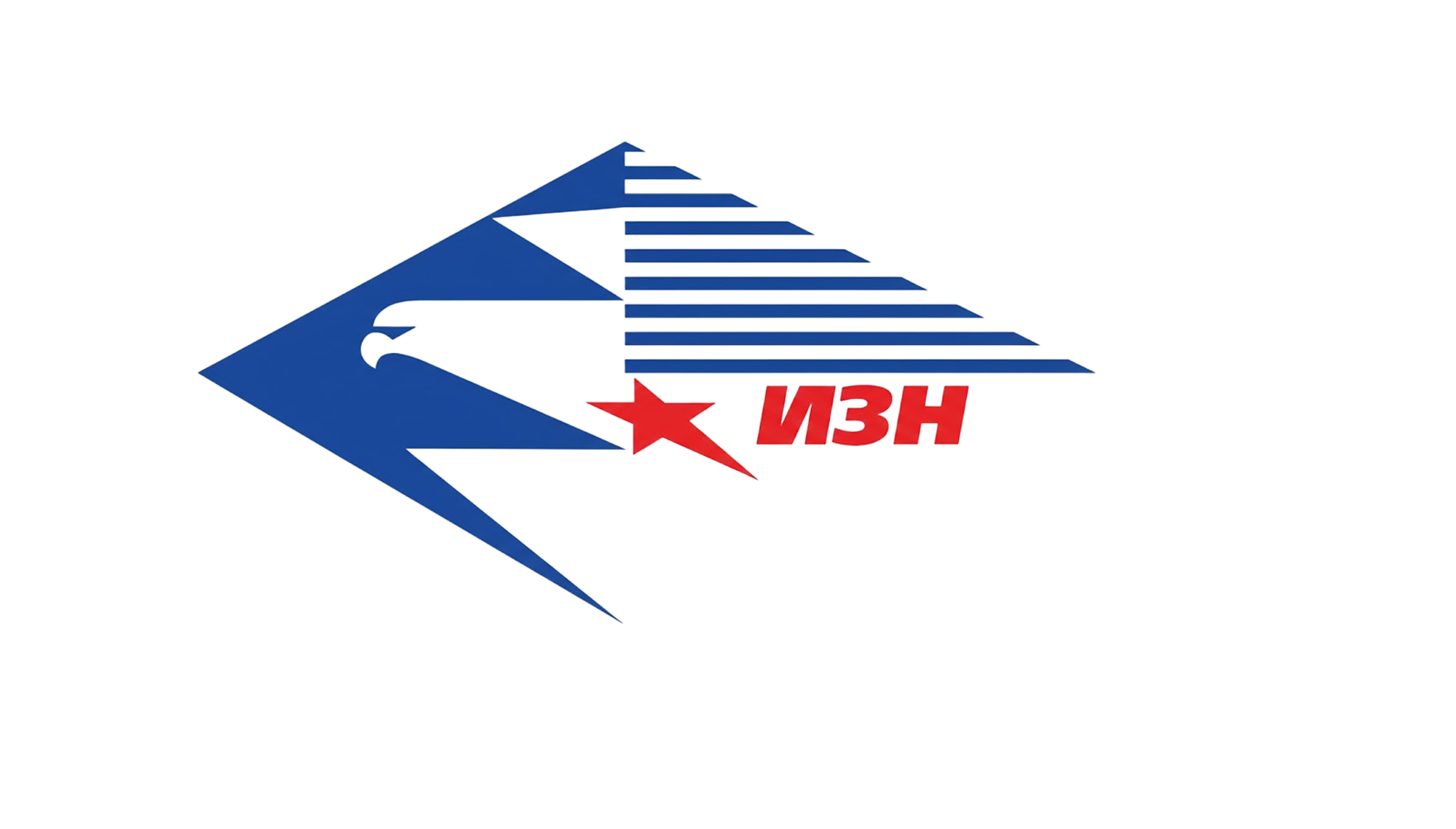
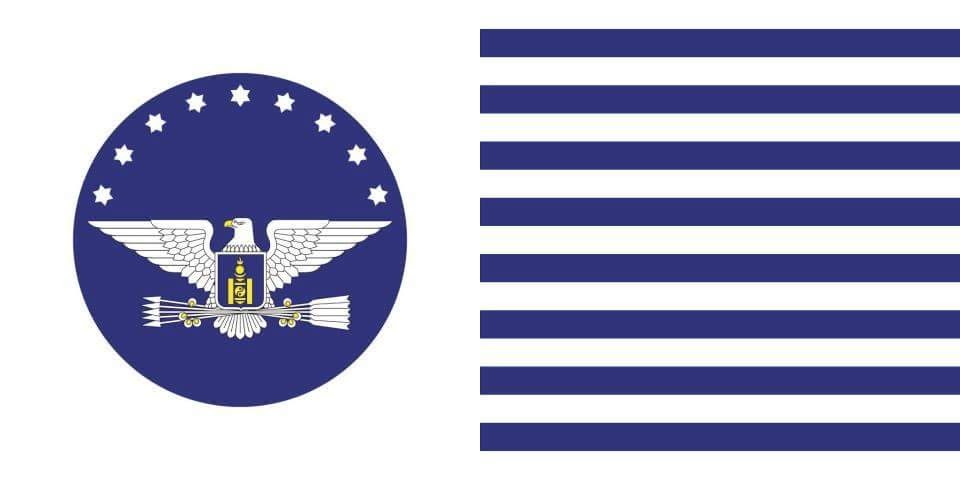
- Flag of the Civil Will Party Flag of the Mongolian Republican Party

The Civil Will–Republican Party (Mongolian: Иргэний Зориг–Бүгд Найрамдах Нам, romanized: Irgenii Zorig–Bügd Nairamdakh Nam) was a short-lived political party in Mongolia. It was the result of a merger between the Civil Will Party and the Mongolian Republican Party on 22 February 2002. The merger split up before the 2004 parliamentary elections and was dissolved in early 2006, which was succeeded by the refounded Civil Will Party.

== History ==
On 22 February 2002, the Civil Will Party (CWP) headed by Sanjaasürengiin Oyun and the Republican Party (RP) headed by businessman Bazarsadyn Jargalsaikhan merged in the lead up to the 2004 parliamentary election. CWP chairwoman Sanjaasürengiin Oyun was elected the party chairperson, while RP chairman Bazarsadyn Jargalsaikhan was elected first deputy chairperson. Three other deputy leaders were also elected.

The CW–RP signed an electoral agreement with the Democratic Party, agreeing to run together in the national and local elections until 2004. However, the party split in April 2004 when the RP decided to field its own candidates for the 2004 elections and was officially registered by the Supreme Court of Mongolia on 5 April 2004.

=== Parliamentary representation ===
The CW–RP ran as part of the Motherland Democratic Coalition (MDC) for the 2004 parliamentary elections. Of the 35 seats in the State Great Khural won by the coalition, two seats were secured by the CW–RP. The RP also won a seat in parliament, making both parties eligible for running in the 2005 presidential election.

In August 2004, a grand coalition government was formed between the two dominant parties, the Democratic Party and the Mongolian People's Revolutionary Party, due to evenly divided seats in the parliament. The MDC was dissolved in late December 2004 after internal disputes regarding the presidential election. However, the CW–RP, with its two seats, remained a confidence partner to the DP and cabinet of Tsakhiagiin Elbegdorj.

Despite the MDC dissolution, the CW–RP did not nominate their own candidate for the 2005 presidential election and declined to back any of the four presidential candidates.

Following the appointment of MPRP leader, Sanjiin Bayar, as prime minister in 2007, the party gained two cabinet positions in December 2007. Party chairperson Oyun was appointed as Minister of Foreign Affairs and deputy chair Tserendorjiin Gankhuyag as Minister of Food and Agriculture.

The party continued to operate as the Civil Will–Republican Party until January 2006, when it changed its party name to the Civil Will Party. With the name change, the nearly four-year existence of the CW–RP came to an end.

== Electoral history ==
=== State Great Khural elections ===
Election	Leader	Seats		Position	Constituency		Status
Election	Leader	No.	+/–	Position	Votes	%	Status
2004	Sanjaasürengiin Oyuun	2 / 76	▲2	4th	464,479 (Note: Run as the Civil Will–Republican Party, part of the Motherland Democratic Coalition)	44.85%	Coalition partner
