= Civil Will Party =

Political party in Mongolia (2000–2012)

Civil Will Party of Mongolia Иргэний Зориг Нам
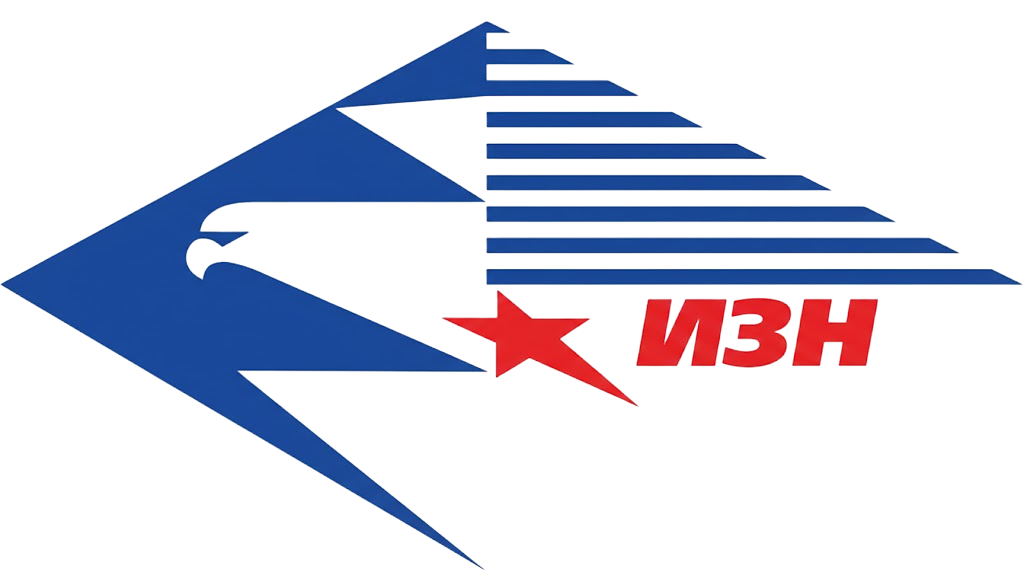
- Abbreviation: CWP (English); ИЗН (Mongolian)
- Founder: Sanjaasürengiin Oyun
- Founded: 9 March 2000 15 January 2006 (Note: Refounded after dissolution of the Civil Will–Republican Party)
- Dissolved: 12 March 2012
- Split from: Democratic Union
- Merged into: Civil Will–Green Party
- Headquarters: Ulaanbaatar
- Ideology: Liberalism; Liberal democracy
- Political position: Centre
- National affiliation: Motherland Democratic Coalition (2003–2004)
- International affiliation: Liberal International (2007–2012)
- Colors: Blue; White
- State Great Khural (2004–2008): 2 / 76

Party flag
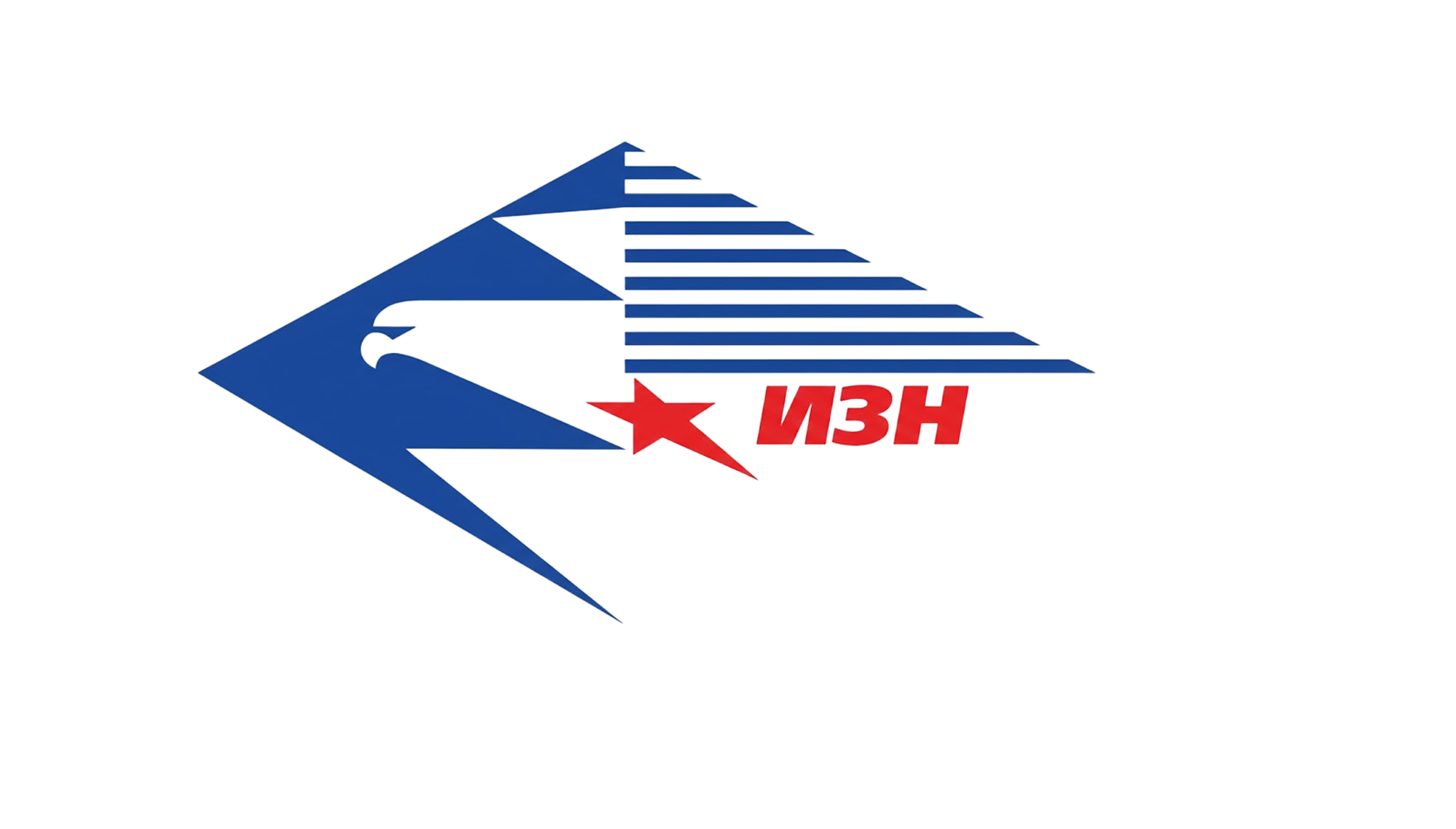

The Civil Will Party (CWP), (Note: In English, the party can be called both the Civil Will Party and the Civil Will Party of Mongolia. The official name of the party in Mongolian is Civil Will Party) also referred to as the Civic Courage Party, (Mongolian: Иргэний Зориг Нам, ИЗН, romanized: Irgeniy Zorig Nam, IZN) was a liberal political party in Mongolia from 2000 to 2002 and again from 2006 to 2012. The CWP was founded by Sanjaasürengiin Oyun, the sister of prominent democratic leader Sanjaasürengiin Zorig, following his murder in 1998.

The party briefly merged with the Republican Party (RP) from 2002 until 2004, when the RP split off to run independently in the 2004 parliamentary elections. On 15 January 2006, the short-lived merger, Civil Will–Republican Party, was formally dissolved and the CWP was refounded. Later, the Mongolian National Unity Party merged into the CWP in 2008.

In March 2012, prior to parliamentary elections in June, the CWP merged with factions of the Mongolian Green Party to form the Civil Will–Green Party, ending its nearly a decade of existence.

== History ==
=== Founding ===
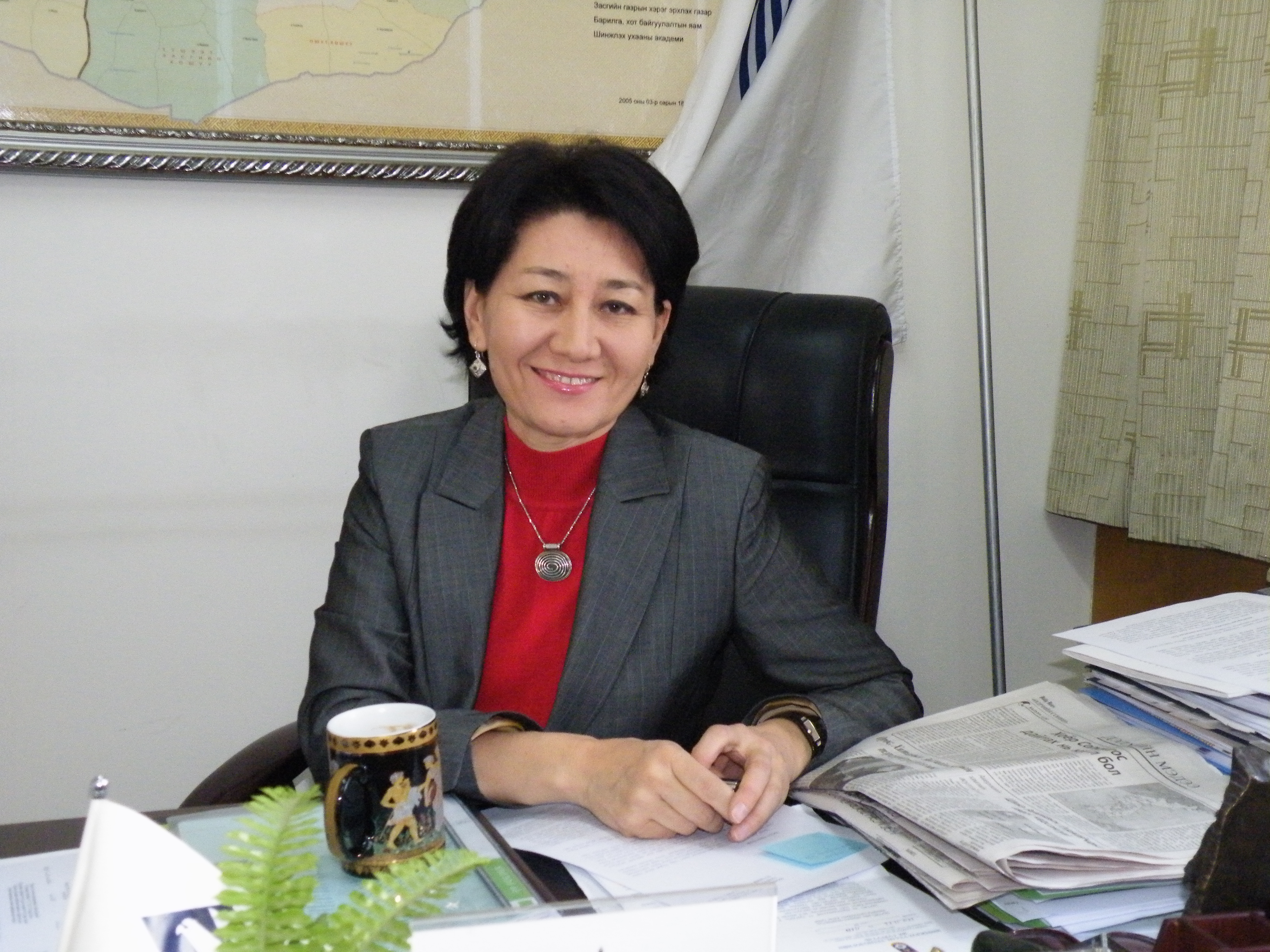
Founder and only chairperson of the Civil Will Party, Sanjaasürengiin Oyun

From 1996 to 2000, Mongolia's first government not led by the ex-communist Mongolian People's Revolutionary Party (MPRP) underwent a series of political crises. On 2 October 1998, leading figure of the 1990 Democratic Revolution, sitting Minister of Infrastructure, and member of parliament Sanjaasürengiin Zorig was murdered at his home. Zorig's sister, Sanjaasürengiin Oyun, ran for his vacant parliamentary seat in Dornod Province. She won the by-election and served as a member of the State Great Khural (parliament) until her term ended in 2000.

The governing Democratic Union Coalition, which consisted of the Mongolian National Democratic Party (MNDP) and the Mongolian Social Democratic Party (MSDP), experienced multiple internal political disputes and disagreements. Dissident MNDP members, in favour of starting Mongolia's "second wave of democratization," re-established the predecessor Mongolian Democratic Party on 23 January 2000. Oyun was among the various dissident leaders who founded the new party prior to the upcoming election.

However, due to internal disagreements, she and Zorig's former allies split off to found their own party, the Civil Will Party, on 9 March 2000. The party adopted Zorig's name, which literally means "Courage" or "Will" in Mongolia. The CWP was registered by the Supreme Court on 23 March 2000 with 1,063 party members, Oyun as chairman, and Tserendorjiin Gankhuyag as vice-chairman.

=== Early years ===
In the subsequent June 2000 elections, the party ran together with the Mongolian Green Party (MGP) and secured a single seat in the 76-member parliament, coming in sixth place. Of the 59 fielded candidates, only Oyun secured a parliamentary seat. The Democratic Union and its former member parties was defeated by the MPRP, which won a landslide victory of 72 seats, securing only a single seat. The former member parties later merged into the Democratic Party (DP) in December 2000.

The For Mongolia Party, established by intellectual figure Luvsandambyn Dashnyam in 1994, merged with the CWP in November 2000 following its unsuccessful campaign as part of the "Grand Coalition." In the 2001 presidential election, the CWP nominated Luvsandambyn Dashnyam as its presidential candidate, who placed third-place with 3.6% of the ballot.

=== Civil Will–Republican Party ===
In 2002, the CWP and the Republican Party (RP) merged and formed the Civil Will–Republican Party (CWRP) for the upcoming 2004 parliamentary election. The CWRP joined the opposition Motherland Democratic Coalition (MDC), composed of the Democratic Party and the Motherland Party, in July 2003. Shortly before the 2004 elections, however, the RP split off and fielded its own candidates. The MDC won 34 out of the 76 seats, and the RP won 1 seat while the MPRP secured 36 seats in the new hung parliament. Subsequently, a grand coalition government was formed between the DP and the MPRP. The MDC was dissolved in late December 2004 after internal disputes regarding the 2005 presidential election. However, the CWRP, with its two seats, remained a confidence partner to the DP and cabinet of Tsakhiagiin Elbegdorj. Following the appointment of MPRP leader, Sanjiin Bayar, as prime minister in 2007, the CWRP gained two cabinet positions in December 2007. Oyun was appointed as Minister of Foreign Affairs and Tserendorjiin Gankhuyag as Minister of Food and Agriculture.

Despite the breakup with the RP, the CWRP still retained its name until its official dissolution on 15 January 2006, when the CWP was re-registered as a political party. Later in 2008, the Mongolian National Unity Party joined the CWP on 25 April. Along with the Mongolian Green Party and an independent, the CWP secured a single seat in the 2008 parliamentary election.

In October 2011, the CWP was fully admitted as a member to the Liberal International. The party has been an observer of the Liberal International since 2007.

=== Civil Will–Green Party ===
Prior to the 2012 parliamentary elections, the CWP proposed an offer to the MGP to join together in 2010. During the 9th Party Congress on 26 March 2011, then-party leader of the MGP and member of parliament Dangaasurengiin Enkhbat accepted the proposal despite internal party disapproval of the idea. The full merger would not be official for a year due to the backlash from MGP members and supporters. The two parties officially merged into the Civil Will–Green Party and registered as a political party by the Supreme Court on 9 March 2012.

== Electoral history ==
=== Presidential elections ===
Election	Party candidate	Votes	%	Result
2001	Luvsandambyn Dashnyam	35,425	3.60%	Lost ✗

=== State Great Khural elections ===
Election	Leader	Seats		Position	Constituency		Status
Election	Leader	No.	+/–	Position	Votes	%	Status
2000 (Note: Run together with the Mongolian Green Party)	Sanjaasürengiin Oyun	1 / 76	New	6th	36,193	3.62%	Opposition
2004	Sanjaasürengiin Oyun	2 / 76	▲1	▼4th	464,479 (Note: Run as the Civil Will–Republican Party, part of the Motherland Democratic Coalition)	44.85%	Coalition partner
2008	Sanjaasürengiin Oyun	1 / 76	▼1	4th	124,367	3.49%	Opposition
