= Erel Group =

Companies of Mongolia

EREL LLC is a Mongolian company headquartered in Ulaanbaatar, active in mining and construction, established in 1989. Founder and current president is Badarchiin Erdenebat, also founder of the Motherland Party. Construction activities began in 1994. The company has 1,200 employees in more than 10 companies in industries ranging from geological exploration, mining, construction, construction materials manufacturing, road construction to banking and education sectors.

In 2000, Erel was the second largest gold mining company in Mongolia after Mongol Gazar, with a 1364 kg yearly output, amounting to 12.9% of the national production.

== See also ==
- Mining in Mongolia
- Environmental issues in Mongolia
