= Zorig Foundation =

Mongolian non-profit NGO

- Formation: October 1998; 28 years ago
- Purpose: Humanitarian
- Location: Ulaanbaatar, Mongolia
- Region served: Mongolia
- Key people: Sanjaasürengiin Oyuun (Founder)
- Website: www.zorigsan.mn www.facebook.com/zorigfoundation
- Affiliated with Zorig Foundation USA and Zorig Foundation Japan

Zorig Foundation (Mongolian: Зориг Сан) is a Mongolian nonprofit, non-governmental organization (NGO) established in October 1998 after the assassination of Mongolian pro-democracy politician Zorig Sanjaasuren. The Zorig Foundation stated that its goal was to spread democratic values in Mongolia.

== History ==
Zorig Sanjaasuren (1962–1998) was a prominent Mongolian politician and leader of the country's 1990 democratic revolution. He is called the "Golden Magpie of Democracy" (Mongolian: Ардчиллын алтан хараацай, Ardchillyn altan kharaatsai). He was murdered in 1998; his murder case is still unsolved. After his death, his sister, Oyun, entered politics and founded the Civil Will Party along with the Zorig Foundation.

== Projects ==
Zorig Foundation runs two notable programs: the Young Leadership Program (YLP) and the Environmental Fellowship Program (EFP).

The Zorig Foundation provides scholarships to Mongolian students studying domestically. Each scholarship is provided through a partnership with the Foundation and various organizations and companies, such as the Swiss Agency for Development and Cooperation, Rio Tinto, and The Asia Foundation.

== Organizational structure ==
The head of the foundation is Sanjaasürengiin Oyuun, a Mongolian politician who is also the Director of External Affairs at the Green Climate Fund. Its current executive director is Maralmaa Munkh-Achit. The foundation auditing board's members are as follows: Bold M., Solongo J., and Sukhbaatar D.
