= 2005 Mongolian presidential election =

- 22 May 2005

Majority of the popular vote needed to prevent a run-off
- Registered: 1,241,691
- Turnout: 74.98% (▼7.96pp)
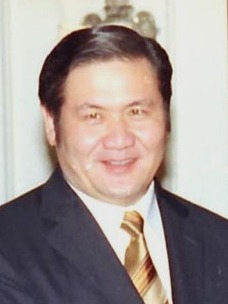

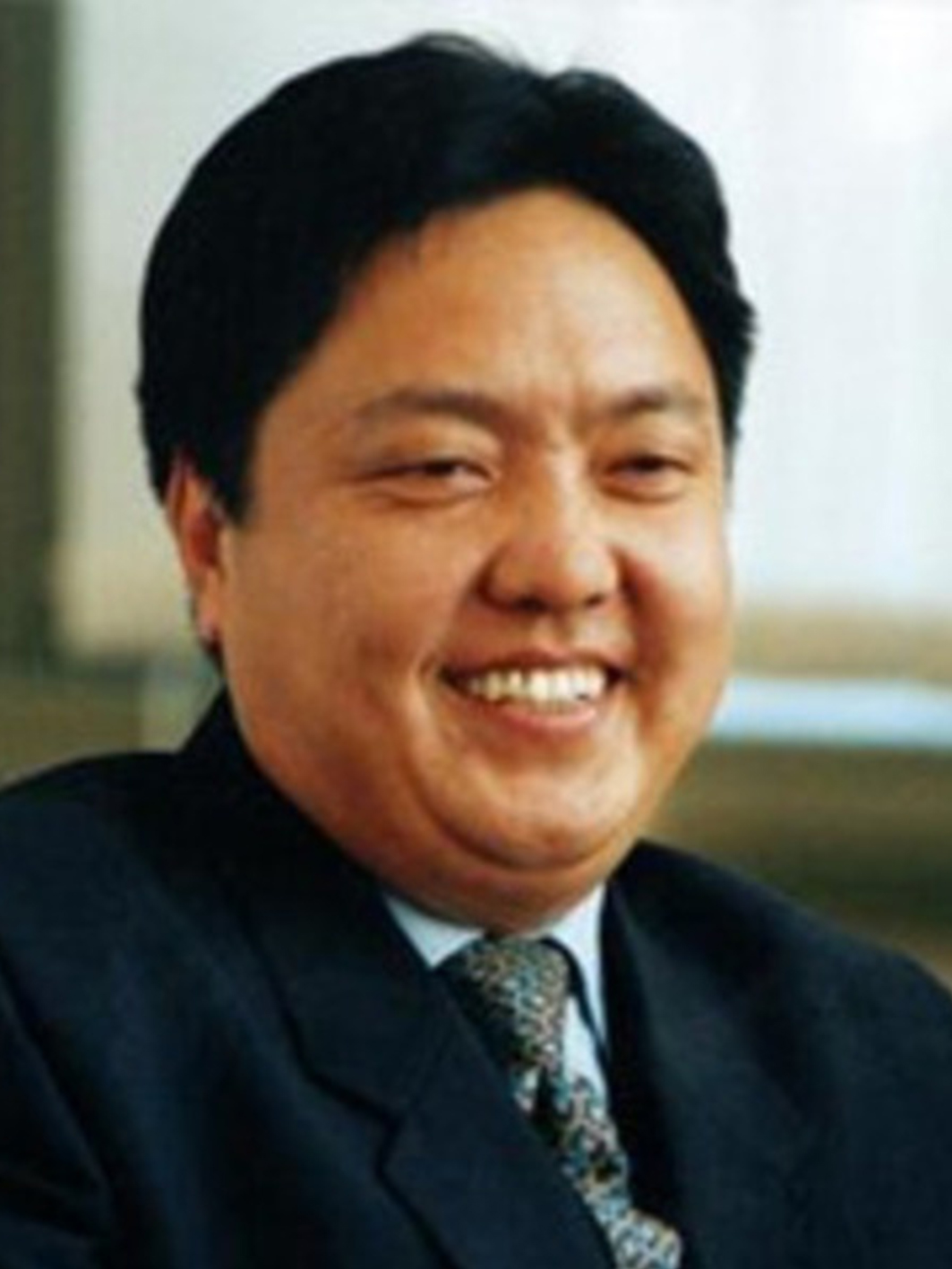

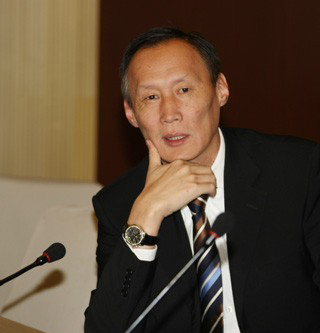

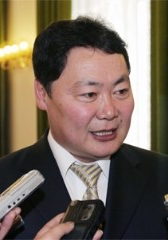
Nominee	Nambaryn Enkhbayar	Mendsaikhany Enkhsaikhan
Party	MPRP	Democratic
Popular vote	497,491	186,646
Percentage	54.14%	20.31%
Nominee	Bazarsadyn Jargalsaikhan	Badarchiin Erdenebat
Party	Republican	Motherland
Popular vote	128,784	105,497
Percentage	14.02%	11.48%
- Results by province
President before election
Natsagiin Bagabandi
MPRP
Elected President
Nambaryn Enkhbayar
MPRP

Presidential elections were held in Mongolia on 22 May 2005. The result was a victory for Nambaryn Enkhbayar of the Mongolian People's Revolutionary Party (MPRP), who received over half of the vote in Mongolia's first four-way presidential election. Mendsaikhany Enkhsaikhan from the country's main opposition Democratic Party placed second with around 20% of the popular vote, while Bazarsadyn Jargalsaikhan of the Republican Party and Badarchiin Erdenebat of the Motherland Party came in third and fourth, respectively.

In the aftermath of his election as the 3rd President of Mongolia, Nambaryn Enkhbayar became the first person in Mongolia's modern history to hold the offices of president, prime minister, and speaker of parliament.

== Background ==
In the 1997 presidential election, the chairman of the Mongolian People's Revolutionary Party (MPRP), Natsagiin Bagabandi, was elected president. He was re-elected in 2001, but term limits meant he could not stand again in 2005.

In the aftermath of the 2004 parliamentary elections, a hung parliament between the ruling MPRP and the opposition Motherland Democratic Coalition (MDC) was convened in July 2004. The MDC consisted of the Democratic Party, the Motherland Party , and the Civil Will–Republican Party. The two parliamentary blocs, both without clear majorities, were forced to form a coalition government headed by Tsakhiagiin Elbegdorj in August.

The MDC was dissolved in December 2004, following internal disagreements and disputes over nominations for the 2005 presidential election.

== Candidates ==
According to the 1992 Constitution of Mongolia, only political parties with parliamentary representation can nominate a candidate for presidential elections. Prior to the 2005 election, there were five political parties represented in the State Great Khural. Out of the five parties, only the Civil Will–Republican Party didn't nominate a candidate.

Candidate nominations opened on 22 March 2005. Ultimately, the General Election Commission (GEC) registered four candidates for the 2005 presidential election. The MPRP candidate was former Prime Minister and incumbent Chairman of the State Great Khural Nambaryn Enkhbayar. Enkhbayar had been chairman of the MPRP since 1997 and was regarded as the clear favourite in the election. Prior to his nomination by the MPRP, Enkhbayar was widely covered by the Mongolian media, with a negative tone from various citizen movements dominating the coverage. He ran on a platform to increase foreign investment and continue liberalising the economy to address poverty in Mongolia.

Enkhbayar's main rival was former prime minister Mendsaikhany Enkhsaikhan of the Democratic Party (DP). Enkhsaikhan received support from anti-communists and called for lower taxes for businesses and subsidies for poorer families. However, he was disadvantaged by divisions within the DP after securing nomination in the party's primaries.

The other two candidates were Bazarsadyn Jargalsaikhan of the Mongolian Republican Party and Badarchiin Erdenebat of the Motherland Party (MLP). Jargalsaikhan was one of the richest people in Mongolia and said that he could put his business skills to use as president. Erdenebat called for a referendum to expand the powers of the President. The Mongolian Traditional United Party, an extra-parliamentary party, expressed its support for Erdenebat and the MLP.

Names	Born	Last position	Party
Nambaryn Enkhbayar	1 June 1958 (46); Ulaanbaatar, Mongolia	Chairman of the MPP (1997–2005); Prime Minister of Mongolia (2000–2004); Chairman of the State Great Khural (2004–2005)	Mongolian People's Revolutionary Party
Mendsaikhany Enkhsaikhan	4 June 1955 (49); Ulaanbaatar, Mongolia	Prime Minister of Mongolia (1996–1998); Member of the State Great Khural (1992–2016)	Democratic Party of Mongolia
Bazarsadyn Jargalsaikhan	20 August 1959 (45); Ulaanbaatar, Mongolia	Member of the State Great Khural (2004–2008); Chairman of the Republican Party (since 2004)	Republican Party
Badarchiin Erdenebat	17 September 1959 (45); Ulaanbaatar, Mongolia	Member of the State Great Khural (2004–2008); Chairman of the Motherland Party (since 1992)	Motherland Party

== Campaign ==
About a million of Mongolia's population were eligible to vote in the election, with 3,800 polling stations across Mongolia. If no candidate secured over half of the votes in the first round of the election, then a run-off would be held on 5 June between the top two candidates. The campaign for the first round officially began on 7 April 2005.

A few days before the election on 12 May 2005, the DP, the RP, and the MLP called on the General Election Commission (GEC) to resign, alleging that the election was not being run cleanly. They claimed the GEC had printed 80,000 extra ballots, which is 11% more than the allowed reserve, in order to cause confusion. The next day, the parties held a public meeting, "Fair Elections!" in Sükhbaatar Square. The outgoing President said that the GEC should do everything possible to ensure the election was fair. The GEC issued a public statement on 6 April, denying that a single party was over-represented. The commission stated that of the 282 persons working in the sub-regions, 94 were MPRP members, 63 DP, 30 MLP, and 17 RP. Out of the 5,296 persons working in the electoral districts, 5,296 were MPRP members, 4,331 DP, 949 MLP, and 286 RP.

Before the election, there were protests by various citizens' movements in the capital, Ulaanbaatar, calling for a more open electoral system and protesting against alleged corruption. However, international election monitors reported that they did not find any irregularities in the election.

Voting began at 7 am and voter turnout was high as usual in Mongolia. Many voters turned out in traditional Mongolian attire, some on horseback, while elsewhere poll workers took ballot boxes to nomadic Mongols who were unable to get to polling stations.

== Opinion polls ==
Several opinion polls were conducted by the International Republican Institute (IRI), Sant Maral Foundation and other firms prior to the May 22 election. Enkhbayar and Enkhsaikhan were considered the main contenders in the race, with around 50% and 20% approval from the public, respectively.

Polling firm	Fieldwork date	Sample size	Enkhbayar MPRP	Enkhsaikhan DP	Jargalsaikhan RP	Erdenebat MLP
IRI	–	1,800	58.0	23.0	–	–
Sant Maral (UB)	–	1,747	53.0	21.0	–	–
Sant Maral (Province)	–	1,747	55.0	26.0	–	–
Prognoz	–	6,336	53.1	25.9	–	–
Prognoz	April 2005	908	56.1	24.6	15.3	3.9

== Results ==
Enkhbayer secured more than 50% of the votes, thus winning an outright victory in the first round and avoiding the need for a run-off. After the results were announced, Enkhsaikhan called Enkhbayar to congratulate him on his victory, and they discussed working together. Enkhbayar was inaugurated as the 3rd President of Mongolia on 24 June and promised to fulfill the pledges that he had made during the campaign.

Candidate	Party	Votes	%
Nambaryn Enkhbayar	Mongolian People's Revolutionary Party	497,491	54.14
Mendsaikhany Enkhsaikhan	Democratic Party	186,646	20.31
Bazarsadyn Jargalsaikhan	Republican Party	128,784	14.02
Badarchiin Erdenebat	Motherland Party	105,497	11.48
Blank votes		466	0.05
Total		918,884	100.00
Valid votes		918,884	98.70
Invalid votes		12,092	1.30
Total votes		930,976	100.00
Registered voters/turnout		1,241,691	74.98
Source: General Election Commission
