= 2000 Mongolian parliamentary election =

- 2 July 2000
- All 76 seats in the State Great Khural; 39 seats needed for a majority
- Turnout: 82.44% (▼9.71pp)
Party	Leader	Vote %	Seats	+/–
MPRP	Nambaryn Enkhbayar	51.75	72	+47
Democratic Union	Rinchinnyamyn Amarjargal	13.30	1	−49
Motherland	Badarchiin Erdenebat	11.08	1	New
Civil Will–Greens	Sanjaasürengiin Oyuun	3.62	1	New
Independents	–	2.94	1	+1
This lists parties that won seats. See the complete results below.
Results by constituency
Prime Minister before	Prime Minister after
Rinchinnyamyn Amarjargal; DUC	Nambaryn Enkhbayar; MPRP

Parliamentary elections were held in Mongolia on 2 July 2000. The result was a victory for the Mongolian People's Revolutionary Party, which won 72 of the 76 seats in the State Great Khural, the unicameral parliament of Mongolia. No other party could win more than one seat. Voter turnout was 82.43%.

== Electoral system ==
Members of the State Great Khural were elected from 76 single-seat constituencies by a plurality voting method. The previous parliamentary elections of 1996 were held under the same system. Of the 76 seats, 20 were elected from the capital city, Ulaanbaatar, and the other 56 were elected from the 21 aimags of Mongolia.

== Contesting parties ==
For the 2000 election, 602 candidates were registered by the newly established General Election Commission, of whom 27 were independents and 575 were running from the following 13 political parties and 3 coalitions. This was twice as many candidates and parties as the previous election.

Party
Mongolian People's Revolutionary Party
Democratic Union Coalition
Mongolian Social Democratic Party
Civil Will Party–Green Party
Motherland–Mongolian Democratic New Socialist Party
Mongolian Democratic Party
Mongolian Republican Party
Grand Coalition (Mongolian Traditional United Party–Mongolian Democratic Renaissance Party–For Mongolia Party)
Mongolian New Social Democratic Party
Mongolian Liberal Democratic Party
Mongolian Civil-Democratic New Liberal Party
Mongolian Party for Tradition and Justice
Mongolian Rural Development Party
Mongolian National Unity Party
Mongolian Workers' Party
Regional Development Party

== Opinion polls ==
Polling firm	Fieldwork date	Sample size	MPRP	MNDP	MSDP	M-MDNSP	MDP	CWP	MRP	Other	Ind.	None	Und./NA/ DK
Sant Maral	19 May – 1 Jun 2000	2,504	51	13	7	11	1	4	4	1	2	–	5
2000 election	2 Jul 2000	–	51.6	13.4	9.1	11.0	1.8	3.6	4.2	2.4	2.9	–	–

== Results ==
Party	Votes	%	Seats	+/–
Mongolian People's Revolutionary Party	516,792	51.75	72	+47
Democratic Union Coalition	132,778	13.30	1	–49
Motherland Party	110,608	11.08	1	New
Mongolian Social Democratic Party	91,319	9.14	0	New
Mongolian Republican Party	41,991	4.20	0	0
Civil Will Party–Green Party	36,193	3.62	1	New
Mongolian Democratic Party	18,167	1.82	0	New
Grand Coalition	9,105	0.91	0	New
Mongolian New Social Democratic Party	4,077	0.41	0	New
Mongolian Liberal Democratic Party	3,151	0.32	0	New
Mongolian Rural Development Party	2,067	0.21	0	New
Mongolian Civil-Democratic New Liberal Party	1,171	0.12	0	New
Mongolian Unity Party	1,027	0.10	0	0
Mongolian Party for Tradition and Justice	588	0.06	0	New
Regional Development Party	238	0.02	0	New
Mongolian Workers' Party	47	0.00	0	0
Independents	29,352	2.94	1	+1
Total	998,671	100.00	76	0
Valid votes	1,002,554	97.52		
Invalid/blank votes	25,454	2.48		
Total votes	1,028,008	100.00		
Registered voters/turnout	1,246,929	82.44		
Source: General Election Commission

=== Results by constituency ===
2000 Mongolian parliamentary election results by constituency
Province	Constituency	MPRP	DUC	MP	MSDP	MRP	CWP–MGP	MDP	GC	MNSDP	MLDP	MRDP	MCDNLP	MUP	MPTJ	RDP	MWP	Ind.	Valid	Invalid	Electorate
Arkhangai	1	7,498		816	7,052		355	294											16,073	415	18,670
Arkhangai	2	4,723	2,946	1,746	2,511	161		1,111	74									463	13,743	993	18,043
Arkhangai	3	7,456	2,620	2,410	691	148		230	516										14,083	444	17,457
Bayan-Ölgii	4	6,974		991			746	2,690											11,407	440	15,350
Bayan-Ölgii	5	5,692	2,020	1,596	1,742	552	474	131	69		55								12,369	501	14,160
Bayan-Ölgii	6	6,149	1,087	1,130	2,585	536		1,203											14,128	409	15,381
Bayankhongor	7	4,304	2,207	2,174	901	331	858	355		274									11,417	343	13,671
Bayankhongor	8	5,446	496	1,510	1,899	172	213	117										3,102	12,966	261	14,806
Bayankhongor	9	7,151	3,525	1,487	1,068	310	183	238	324										14,299	475	16,442
Bulgan	10	8,946	573	1,946	1,317	303	1,566												14,677	467	17,715
Bulgan	11	11,306	498	798	1,241						174								14,033	277	16,651
Govi-Altai	12	9,868	574	1,906	1,158	1,012	158		137									879	15,701	274	17,936
Govi-Altai	13	6,201	973	924	2,509	734		113										3,121; 754	15,345	340	17,377
Govisümber and Dornogovi	14	8,732	930	2,493	715	305													15,428	336	15,913
Govisümber and Dornogovi	15	7,361	641	845	1,030	757	392						88					4,769	13,685	349	19,353
Dornod	16	3,583	3,232	318		371	408	84											8,009	239	10,042
Dornod	17	5,477	611		164		6,515												12,778	202	16,445
Dornod	18	5,618	952	1,731	323	470	515	1,016											10,645	324	13,253
Dundgovi	19	5,273	1,691	1,797	772	1,044	1,181	85			295								12,167	267	12,567
Dundgovi	20	3,650	6,875			230					42								10,808	168	12,092
Zavkhan	21	6,295	533	1,409	2,925	171	1,039	40	211										12,626	195	15,965
Zavkhan	22	11,489	953		1,728		344	168											14,688	169	16,427
Zavkhan	23	8,257	4,374	2,138	713		272	53											15,812	209	17,815
Övörkhangai	24	6,028	1,895	817	734	89	114	116	1,408										11,229	226	14,457
Övörkhangai	25	4,940	4,907	1,746	610	107		49											12,374	272	14,667
Övörkhangai	26	8,187	3,041	581	1,448	133													13,406	343	15,260
Övörkhangai	27	6,546	3,262	1,885	1,173	154	141	927				796							14,908	445	17,142
Ömnögovi	28	6,672	4,018	387	283	507	196	18											12,096	224	13,617
Ömnögovi	29	5,715	3,634	580		658		188	95										10,882	245	12,645
Sükhbaatar	30	7,313	2,287	1,264	266	288	302	193										795	12,726	262	14,835
Sükhbaatar	31	6,395	1,562	2,119	446	72	710	171		1,767	74	1,129	49		537				15,053	410	16,801
Selenge	32	7,981		908	5,096	332	407	230											14,973	282	19,316
Selenge	33	7,987	1,641	1,991		1,262	287	31	175							27		801	14,231	389	18,398
Selenge	34	5,481	5,429	560		215	309		398									1,034	13,537	238	16,338
Töv	35	6,672	2,571	1,569	499	719	294	45			38								12,420	591	16,077
Töv	36	6,159	707	875	216	876	117	111											9,077	152	11,043
Töv	37	6,571	1,637	1,041	1,670		400	32											11,357	223	15,030
Töv	38	5,750	1,114	1,841	324	172	364	24					159						9,758	236	13,676
Uvs	39	6,355	786	695	493	483	1,097	8	95		13								10,047	233	13,336
Uvs	40	9,192	655	1,975	499	149	1,461				35								13,979	441	16,119
Uvs	41	7,729	1,006	1,108	1,928	2,051	155	43										254	14,294	602	16,229
Khovd	42	4,803	1,901	2,639	295	238	129	39					23						10,085	230	12,588
Khovd	43	9,552	2,033	850	692	155		475	42									602	14,406	326	15,925
Khovd	44	7,161	3,649	1,604	856	186	88	21			1,323		58			57			15,010	403	15,583
Khövsgöl	45	4,164	437	678	1,367	202	52	18	95	135			141					5,196	12,498	329	15,336
Khövsgöl	46	6,603	1,659	1,904	3,080	291				746									14,318	397	16,982
Khövsgöl	47	7,445	823	2,787	439	457			104	103								1,351; 816	14,340	345	16,912
Khövsgöl	48	6,723	173	3,076	4,109	139	483	256				117		229					15,326	455	17,820
Khentii	49	4,584	3,959	394	1,221	91		15											10,276	272	12,551
Khentii	50	5,491	1,677	1,784	1,655	305		82	188										11,195	284	13,925
Khentii	51	5,509	1,632	724	206		173											1,806	10,059	286	11,776
Darkhan-Uul	52	4,929	3,249	1,022	427	271	217	58			43		20			59		77	10,384	242	13,944
Darkhan-Uul	53	4,493	3,820	581	268	204	173	55			17		32			40			9,683	129	13,013
Darkhan-Uul	54	6,000	2,051	1,326	412	1,095	170	152								55			11,273	236	15,326
Orkhon	55	6,858	262	2,745	3,963	585	482	178										161	15,256	270	20,068
Orkhon	56	6,267	1,310	1,631	1,114	1,040	243		111									596; 505	12,857	267	17,326
Ulaanbaatar	57	7,999	1,328	1,663	3,019	611	885	158					23				47	101	15,842	251	20,723
Ulaanbaatar	58	8,831	981	2,885	1,077	713	896	140	109					48					15,705	353	21,127
Ulaanbaatar	59	9,932	3,118	1,930	704	519	785	217	82				30		51			962; 271; 69	18,700	706	27,418
Ulaanbaatar	60	6,877	1,806	868	1,095	5,798		117	91		602		156	15				636	18,075	500	21,791
Ulaanbaatar	61	4,994	1,425	5,517	527	222		644	177									96	13,616	228	17,592
Ulaanbaatar	62	8,206	1,419	4,544	389	614	192	294	160		47		17	33				97	16,044	611	21,306
Ulaanbaatar	63	6,186	2,660	654	512	1,009	521	462	45	136			32						12,230	236	16,390
Ulaanbaatar	64	7,618	4,595	882		443	275	247			31		12	40					14,150	263	18,854
Ulaanbaatar	65	8,915	271	769	930	308	213	2,900			11								14,338	317	18,871
Ulaanbaatar	66	7,778		736	1,303	1,297	675	279		106			37						12,211	318	16,201
Ulaanbaatar	67	7,982	937	3,301	567	1,137	713	100	326		158		28	520					15,810	526	22,464
Ulaanbaatar	68	8,929	1,504	1,922		1,229	435	342	470		63		44						15,006	369	20,682
Ulaanbaatar	69	7,150	392	1,289	2,055	663	506	30		774	95		44	142					13,167	169	17,004
Ulaanbaatar	70	6,637	515	610	1,704	3,019	293	31			17								12,835	405	16,279
Ulaanbaatar	71	6,195	826	653	1,936	457	1,045	49		36			27					38	11,275	173	14,601
Ulaanbaatar	72	5,961	413	1,351	3,144	638	581	84	209				34						12,442	363	17,148
Ulaanbaatar	73	6,721	327	1,999	889	327	2,521	182	2,285			25	66						15,371	520	22,066
Ulaanbaatar	74	5,283	1,693	785		993	605	90	304				28						10,795	211	14,398
Ulaanbaatar	75	5,459		1,230	1,849	463	407	146					23						9,588	186	13,678
Ulaanbaatar	76	9,435	1,470	1,168	786	398	862	192	805		18								15,154	367	20,744
Total		516,792	132,778	110,608	91,319	41,991	36,193	18,167	9,105	4,077	3,151	2,067	1,171	1,027	588	238	47	20,907	1,002,554	25,454	1,246,929
