= Republican Party (Mongolia) =

Political party in Mongolia

Republican Party Бүгд Найрамдах Нам
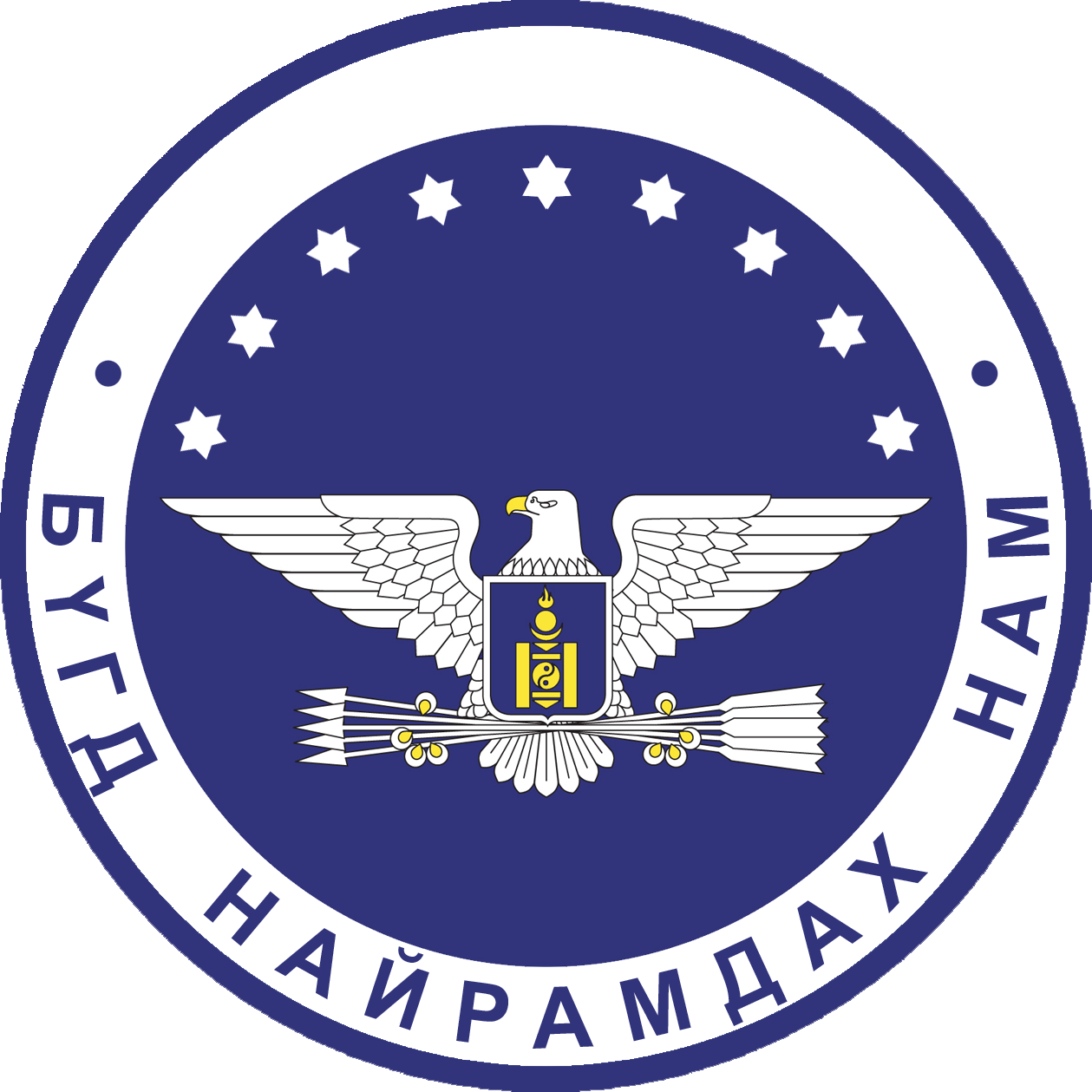
- Abbreviation: MRP or RP (English); БНН (Mongolian)
- Chairman: Bazarsadyn Jargalsaikhan
- Founder: Bazarsadyn Jargalsaikhan
- Founded: March 1992 5 April 2004 (After breakup with the Civil Will Party)
- Ideology: Conservatism; Right-wing populism
- Political position: Centre-right
- Colors: Dark blue
- State Great Khural: 0 / 126

Party flag
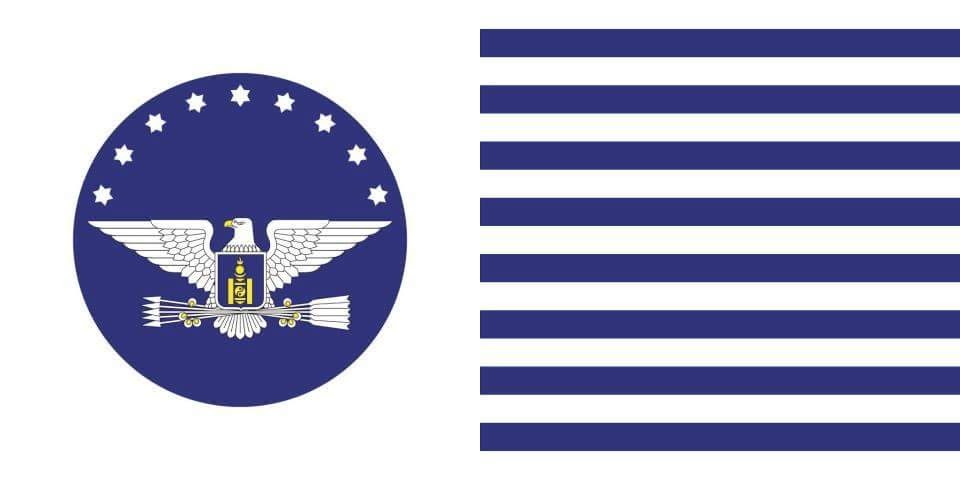

The Republican Party (RP) (Mongolian: Бүгд Найрамдах Нам, БНН, romanized: Bügd Nairamdakh Nam) is a political party in Mongolia. It was founded in March 1992 by businessman Bazarsadyn Jargalsaikhan with a conservative and free market-oriented ideology.

== History ==
=== Founding and early history ===
The party was founded as the Mongolian Capitalists' Party, alternatively called the Mongolian Bourgeois Party (Mongolian: Монголын Хөрөнгөтний Нам, МХН, romanized: Mongolyn Khurungutniy Nam, MKhN) in March 1992 by businessman Bazarsadyn Jargalsaikhan, who actively supported the Mongolian democratic movement in 1990. The party was founded with the aim of protecting small business interests, which began to formulate following the country's first stages of privatization. Registered on 7 April 1992, the party unsuccessfully ran with 13 member and 5 independent candidates in the 1992 parliamentary election.

Following the election, the party joined a loose political coalition with the Mongolian United Party of Herdsmen and Farmers, Mongolian United Party of Private Owners, and Mongolian Party for Independence to oppose the former communist Mongolian People's Revolutionary Party and parliamentary opposition Mongolian National Democratic Party, founded by three parties in late 1992. This coalition later merged together and founded the Mongolian Traditional United Party in December 1993. However, the Mongolian Bourgeois Party remained in existence and official registration. The party ran in the 1996 parliamentary election but didn't win any seat in the State Great Khural.

The party retained its initial name until February 1997, when it changed its name to the Mongolian Republican Party (MRP) (Mongolian: Монголын Бүгд Найрамдах Нам, МБНН, romanized: Mongolyn Bügd Nairamdakh Nam, MBNN). In May 1999, businessman Sambuugiin Otgonbayar was elected the vice party chair while Luvsandambyn Dashnyam was elected the secretary-general of the party. The appointments coincided with the planned merger with the For Mongolia Party but the amalgamation collapsed in January 2000. The MRP ran alone while the For Mongolia Party ran as part of the "Grand Coalition" with the Mongolian Traditional United Party and the Mongolian Democratic Renaissance Party in the 2000 parliamentary election. Both parties didn't manage to secure parliamentary seats. Following the parliamentary elections, the For Mongolia Party merged with the new established Civil Will Party (CWP) which secured a single seat.

=== Merger ===
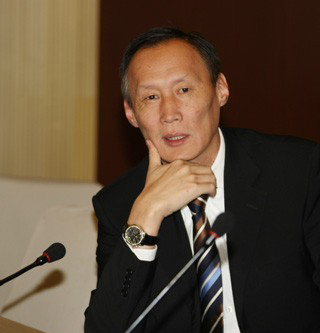
Party chairman and lawmaker Bazarsadyn Jargalsaikhan, 2008

In February 2002, the Civil Will Party and the Republican Party merged as the "Civil Will–Republican Party." The Civil Will Party chairwoman Sanjaasürengiin Oyun, sister of murdered pro-democracy politician, Sanjaasürengiin Zorig, was elected the chairperson of the CWRP while Republican Party leader Jargalsaikhan was chosen the first deputy chair. This merge was short-lived and the two parties broke up before the elections in 2004.

=== Recent history ===
The Republican Party was re-registered as an official political party in April 2004 by the Supreme Court and the Civil Will Party changed back to its original name in January 2006. The party won its first and only seat in the State Great Khural in the 2004 parliamentary election. With representation in the State Great Khural, the RP gained eligiblity to nominate a candidate for the 2005 presidential election. Party chairman and member of parliament Bazarsadyn Jargalsaikhan was nominated in a four-way race and received 13.83% of the total vote.

Party composition of the new parliament was evenly divided between the country's two main political forces, the Mongolian People's Revolutionary Party (MPRP) and the Democratic Party (DP), which formed a power-sharing coalition government in August 2004. Political disputes in the Democratic Party caused several of its lawmakers to vote against and found their own parties. With dissenting legislator support, the MPRP left the government in January 2006 and formed a new coalition government led by its leader Miyeegombyn Enkhbold. The cabinet of Enkhbold appointed RP chairman Jargalsaikhan as Minister of Industry and Trade, a position held by him until cabinet dissolution in November 2007.

Since 2008, the Republican Party has remained an extra-parliamentary party, sometimes considered by the public as a "one man party". Bazarsadyn Jargalsaikhan has served as the leader of the Republican Party (and its predecessors) since 1992 and is considered a perennial candidate.

== Electoral history ==
=== Presidential election ===
Election	Party candidate	Votes	%	Result
2005	Bazarsadyn Jargalsaikhan	128,784	13.83%	Lost ✗

=== State Great Khural elections ===
Election	Party leader	Votes	%	Seats	+/–	Position	Government
1992	Bazarsadyn Jargalsaikhan	60,207	1.99%	0 / 76	New	6th	Extra-parliamentary
1996	Bazarsadyn Jargalsaikhan	17,581	1.74%	0 / 76	0	6th	Extra-parliamentary
2000	Bazarsadyn Jargalsaikhan	41,991	4.19%	0 / 76	0	▲5rd	Extra-parliamentary
2004	Bazarsadyn Jargalsaikhan	14,367	1.39%	1 / 76	▲1	▲3rd	Opposition (until 2006)
2004	Bazarsadyn Jargalsaikhan	14,367	1.39%	1 / 76	▲1	▲3rd	Coalition partner (2006–2007)
2004	Bazarsadyn Jargalsaikhan	14,367	1.39%	1 / 76	▲1	▲3rd	Opposition (since 2007)
2008	Bazarsadyn Jargalsaikhan	24,806	1.43%	0 / 76	▼1	▼4th	Extra-parliamentary
2012 (Note: Ran as part of the Third Force Coalition.)	Bazarsadyn Jargalsaikhan	16,656	1.47%	0 / 76	0	▼5th	Extra-parliamentary
2016	Bazarsadyn Jargalsaikhan	23,118	1.64%	0 / 76	0	5th	Extra-parliamentary
2020 (Note: Ran as part of the New Coalition.)	Bazarsadyn Jargalsaikhan	213,812	5.35%	0 / 76	0	▲4th	Extra-parliamentary
2024	Bazarsadyn Jargalsaikhan	19,635	1.35%	0 / 126	0	▼9th	Extra-parliamentary
