= Poverty in Mongolia =

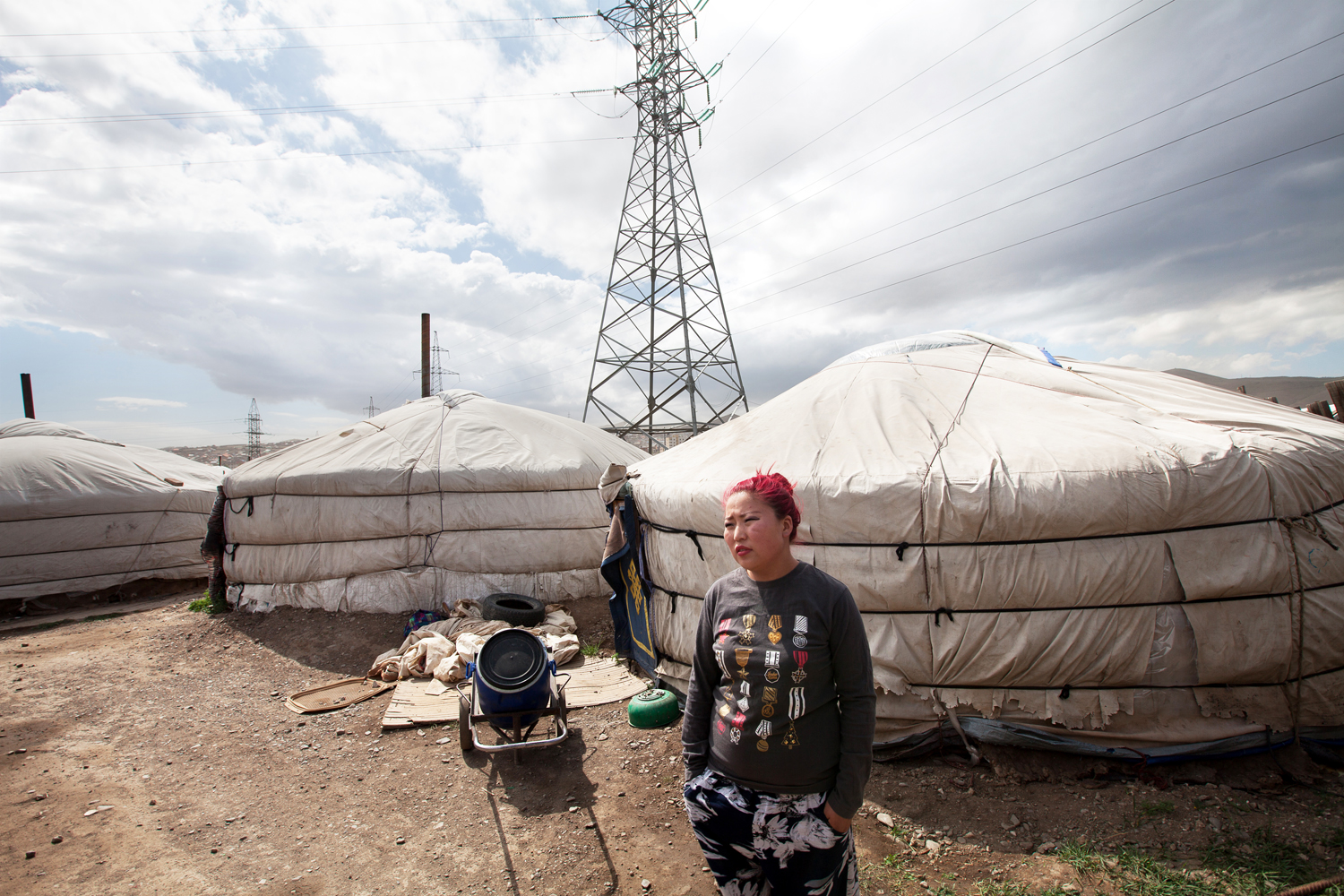
Poverty in Ulaanbaatar, Mongolia

Mongolia is a lower middle-income country and poverty has been a social challenge in the country.

== Statistics ==
As of 2022, the poverty rate in Mongolia is 27.1%. In 2020, 66% of male and 50% of female are employed. In 2018, Govisümber Province had the highest poverty rate among all provinces in the country with 51.9% poverty rate. And in terms of number of people, Ulaanbaatar had the highest number of people living below poverty rate at 378,200 people.

== Cause ==
Many Mongolian herders who live in rural areas are faced with extreme droughts and winters year round that cause massive death in their livestock. When this happen, herders are left with no choice but to move to cities to look for employment, thus the always expanding of poor areas in urban areas.
