= Motherland Party (Mongolia) =

Political party in Mongolia

Motherland Party Эх орон нам
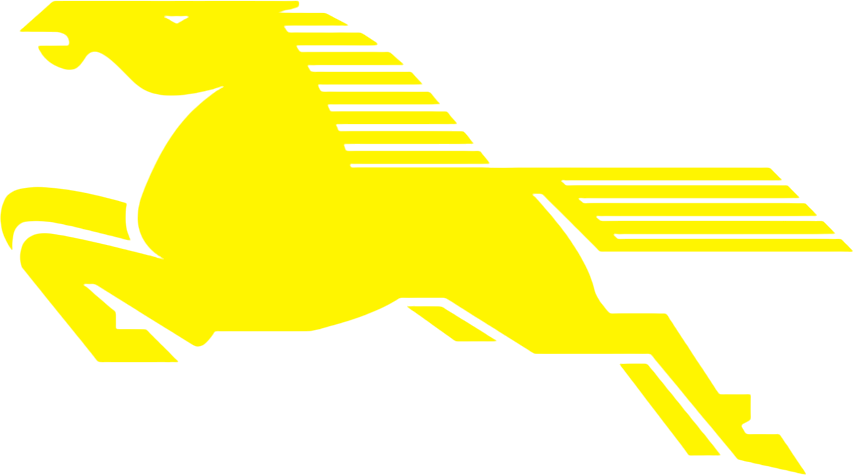
- Abbreviation: ЭОН
- Founder: Badarchiin Erdenebat
- Founded: 22 December 1992
- Registered: December 1998
- Headquarters: Ulaanbaatar
- Membership: 16,000
- Ideology: Social liberalism Social democracy
- Political position: Centre-left
- Colors: Yellow
- State Great Khural: 0 / 126

Party flag
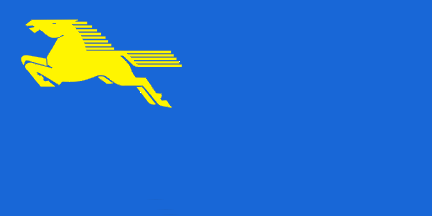

The Motherland Party (Mongolian: Эх орон нам, Ekh oron nam), known until 2000 as the Mongolian Democratic New Socialist Party (Mongolian: Монголын Ардчилсан Шинэ Социалист Нам, Mongolyn Ardchilsan Shine Sotsialist Nam) and from 2000 to 2005 as the Motherland – Mongolian Democratic New Socialist Party, is a center-left political party in Mongolia.

== History ==
It was founded by the owner of Erel Group, Badarchiin Erdenebat, and was registered by the Supreme Court on 22 December 1998. There is a considerable overlap between employees of the Erel group and members of the Motherland party, and the party is popularly also known as the Erel Party.

In the 2000 parliamentary election, the party won its first seat in the State Great Khural and was one of the three parliamentary opposition parties. The former communist Mongolian People's Revolutionary Party won a supermajority of 72 seats in parliament, whilst the Democratic Union Coalition, which won the 1996 election, lost its 49 out of 50 seats. This setback would eventually force the many opposition parties to unite and form the Democratic Party in late 2000.

The Motherland Party founded the Motherland Democratic Coalition with the newly founded Democratic Party, and won 7 seats in the State Great Khural from 2004 to 2008. The party was a part of a coalition government led by the Democratic Party, holding two seats in government from 2006 to 2007, where party chairman Badarchiin Erdenebat was Minister for Fuel and Resources, and party secretary Ichinkhorloogiin Erdenebaatar was Minister for the Environment.

For the 2005 presidential election, Erdenebat was nominated as the party's candidate. He placed last and won 11.49% of the vote.

The party failed to win any seats in the 2008 parliamentary elections, and since 2008, the party has remained an extra-parliamentary party.

== Electoral history ==
=== Presidential election ===
Election	Party candidate	Votes	%	Result
2005	Badarchiin Erdenebat	105,497	11.49%	Lost ✗

=== State Great Khural elections ===
Election	Party leader	Votes	%	Seats	+/–	Position	Government
2000	Badarchiin Erdenebat	110,608	11.03%	1 / 76	New	3rd	Opposition
2004 (Note: Run as part of the Motherland Democratic Coalition.)	Badarchiin Erdenebat	464,479	44.85%	7 / 76	▲6	2nd	Coalition government
2008	Badarchiin Erdenebat	—	—	0 / 76	▼7	—	Extra-parliamentary
2012	Badarchiin Erdenebat	9,082	0.80%	0 / 76	0	7th	Extra-parliamentary
2016	Badarchiin Erdenebat	Did not contest		0 / 76	0	—	Extra-parliamentary
2020 (Note: Run as part of the New Coalition.)	Badarchiin Erdenebat	213,812	5.35%	0 / 76	0	▲4th	Extra-parliamentary
2024	Badarchiin Erdenebat	5,621	0.39%	0 / 126	0	▼14th	Extra-parliamentary
