= 1996 Mongolian parliamentary election =

- 30 June 1996
- All 76 seats in the State Great Khural; 39 seats needed for a majority
- Turnout: 92.15% (▼3.45pp)
Party	Leader	Vote %	Seats	+/–
Democratic Union	Tsakhiagiin Elbegdorj	47.24	50	New
MPRP	Büdragchaagiin; Dash-Yondon	40.64	25	−45
MTUP	Ochirbatyn Dashbalbar	1.80	1	New
This lists parties that won seats. See the complete results below.
Results by constituency
Prime Minister before	Prime Minister after
Puntsagiin Jasrai; MPRP	Mendsaikhany Enkhsaikhan; DUC

Parliamentary elections were held in Mongolia on 30 June 1996. The result was a victory for the Democratic Union Coalition, which won 50 of the 76 seats in the State Great Khural, the unicameral parliament of Mongolia. The former ruling Mongolian People's Revolutionary Party lost 45 of its seats and was reduced to a minority of 25 seats. The Mongolian Traditional United Party won a single seat. Voter turnout was 92%.

The MPRP was out of government for the first time in its 75 years since the 1921 People's Revolution. The election was the first major legislative victory by the Mongolian opposition, and marked the first fully non-MPRP government since 1921.

== Contesting parties ==
For the 1996 election, 302 candidates were registered by the newly established General Election Commission, of whom 35 were independents and 267 were running from the following 5 political parties and 2 coalitions.

Party	Total
Mongolian People's Revolutionary Party	76
Democratic Union Coalition (Mongolian National Democratic Party–Mongolian Social Democratic Party–Mongolian Green Party–Mongolian Democratic Renaissance Party)	74
Mongolian National Unity Party	32
Democratic State Coalition (Mongolian Democratic Socialist Party–Mongolian People's Party)	42
Mongolian Traditional United Party	17
Mongolian Bourgeois Party	24
Mongolian Workers' Party	2
Total	267

== American involvement ==
The National Endowment for Democracy, a U.S. Government agency, helped unite several political parties, intellectuals, businessmen, students and other activists into the Democratic Union Coalition and then trained them in grassroots campaigning and membership recruiting. They also assisted in distributing 350,000 copies of a manifesto calling for private property rights, a free press and foreign investment to help convince people to vote out the Mongolian People's Revolutionary Party.

== Results ==
Party or alliance		Votes	%	Seats	+/–
Democratic Union Coalition	Mongolian National Democratic Party	475,330	47.24	34	New
Democratic Union Coalition	Mongolian Social Democratic Party	475,330	47.24	13	+12
Democratic Union Coalition	Mongolian Green Party	475,330	47.24	0	0
Democratic Union Coalition	Mongolian Democratic Renaissance Party	475,330	47.24	0	New
Democratic Union Coalition	Non-party	475,330	47.24	3	+3
Democratic Union Coalition	Total	475,330	47.24	50	New
Mongolian People's Revolutionary Party		408,929	40.64	25	–45
Democratic State Coalition	Mongolian Democratic Socialist Party	31,413	3.12	0	New
Democratic State Coalition	Mongolian People's Party	31,413	3.12	0	0
Democratic State Coalition	Total	31,413	3.12	0	New
Mongolian National Unity Party		22,587	2.24	0	New
Mongolian Traditional United Party		18,135	1.80	1	New
Mongolian Bourgeois Party		17,561	1.75	0	0
Mongolian Workers' Party		1,211	0.12	0	New
Independents		31,097	3.09	0	–1
Total		1,006,263	100.00	76	0
Valid votes		1,010,193	95.55		
Invalid/blank votes		47,008	4.45		
Total votes		1,057,201	100.00		
Registered voters/turnout		1,147,268	92.15		
Source: General Election Commission

=== Results by constituency ===
1996 Mongolian parliamentary election results by constituency
Province	Constituency	DUC	MPRP	DSC	MNUP	MTUP	MBP	MWP	Ind.	Valid	Invalid	Electorate
Arkhangai	1	11,653	4,725							16,395	574	17,880
Arkhangai	2	4,473	5,538	1,122	3,050	189				14,417	720	15,771
Arkhangai	3	8,878	5,093	264			426			14,687	538	16,212
Bayan-Ölgii	4	2,338	6,701	546			120		398; 31	10,102	726	12,545
Bayan-Ölgii	5	5,261	5,343			463				11,067	666	12,117
Bayan-Ölgii	6	4,996	6,044						1,643	12,683	433	13,599
Bayankhongor	7	6,721	4,293	213						11,241	635	12,565
Bayankhongor	8	7,394	4,084		893					12,379	320	13,015
Bayankhongor	9	9,412	3,587	160		460	153		796	14,577	573	15,731
Bulgan	10	7,214	5,859	642			1,041		300	15,091	661	16,547
Bulgan	11	7,378	5,604						2,081	15,094	475	15,887
Govi-Altai	12	4,256	10,882					907		16,049	393	16,954
Govi-Altai	13	3,659	9,624	757		2,026				16,092	610	17,228
Govisümber and Dornogovi	14		8,199	4,869						13,276	734	15,313
Govisümber and Dornogovi	15	5,681	9,344							15,148	874	16,716
Dornod	16	5,724	3,835							9,621	372	11,219
Dornod	17	7,645	4,143							11,838	634	14,004
Dornod	18	7,531	4,738	344	246					12,906	538	14,797
Dundgovi	19	4,107	4,351	1,710		2,284				12,499	459	13,463
Dundgovi	20	5,687	4,234		1,136					11,121	512	12,043
Zavkhan	21	5,422	7,533	223		266			241	13,700	381	15,773
Zavkhan	22	9,550	6,482							16,072	651	17,105
Zavkhan	23	8,550	7,171							15,731	649	16,830
Övörkhangai	24	5,379	4,702						1,102; 200	11,395	496	13,838
Övörkhangai	25	7,895	4,180			456				12,543	741	14,122
Övörkhangai	26	5,610	7,381			477				13,486	475	14,769
Övörkhangai	27	5,001	5,006						3,043; 506	13,556	888	15,102
Ömnögovi	28	4,998	3,953			1,411	856			11,237	297	11,957
Ömnögovi	29	6,426	4,077							10,524	316	11,082
Sükhbaatar	30	4,294	7,784				304		486	12,898	564	13,999
Sükhbaatar	31	5,136	3,179			5,400			682	14,433	696	15,440
Selenge	32	8,146	5,772		926		252			15,171	769	17,482
Selenge	33	8,695	5,213	225	395				424	14,991	760	17,361
Selenge	34	5,839	5,943	885						12,723	599	14,508
Töv	35	7,733	6,234	484						14,508	693	16,025
Töv	36	3,418	6,143		256					9,850	401	11,428
Töv	37	5,404	6,020	925						12,380	445	13,542
Töv	38	5,957	4,444	450	451				778	12,124	533	14,243
Uvs	39	2,966	6,306				132		1,810; 209	11,452	604	14,271
Uvs	40	5,063	9,115				357			14,578	951	16,696
Uvs	41		9,512	3,041		354	787		365	14,122	1,051	17,082
Khovd	42	3,736	5,361	315	315	78				9,820	527	11,145
Khovd	43	5,020	9,241							14,261	485	15,130
Khovd	44	5,643	6,846			872			1,385	14,751	490	15,496
Khövsgöl	45	5,804	4,030	1,049		484	1,628			13,016	502	14,449
Khövsgöl	46	8,422	4,918				301			13,693	880	15,926
Khövsgöl	47	7,441	5,771			353				13,603	595	15,243
Khövsgöl	48	7,011	6,999		697					14,762	732	16,244
Khentii	49	7,484	3,825	254						11,600	443	13,141
Khentii	50	7,671	3,363		937				174	12,164	388	12,801
Khentii	51	6,334	2,545	1,554						10,449	374	11,179
Darkhan-Uul	52	7,823	2,785	311	126					11,080	413	13,289
Darkhan-Uul	53	5,265	3,248		2,526					11,080	244	12,742
Darkhan-Uul	54	5,913	4,170	442	1,725					12,279	625	14,682
Orkhon	55	7,326	4,548	1,652						13,585	697	16,090
Orkhon	56	8,407	4,922							13,433	616	15,979
Ulaanbaatar	57	8,266	4,331	241	244		835		809; 718; 64	15,576	1,052	18,560
Ulaanbaatar	58	7,710	2,613	427	147	320			2,485; 419	14,216	979	17,189
Ulaanbaatar	59	7,120	4,994	1,582	1,431					15,273	822	18,710
Ulaanbaatar	60	7,913	6,104			2,242	1,729			18,062	1,182	21,191
Ulaanbaatar	61	4,530	5,442	466	492				2,876	13,899	838	16,813
Ulaanbaatar	62	8,006	4,828	480	179		1,978			15,596	777	17,422
Ulaanbaatar	63	6,736	3,937	270	130		635		1,095	12,861	612	14,878
Ulaanbaatar	64	8,673	4,953		113				978; 110	14,900	601	16,697
Ulaanbaatar	65	4,958	5,382	549	2,170					13,243	629	15,519
Ulaanbaatar	66	4,287	4,313	718	74		562		2,166; 560; 142	12,907	713	15,459
Ulaanbaatar	67	7,174	5,196	165	164		1,208	304		14,311	848	16,612
Ulaanbaatar	68	8,394	4,269	472	311					13,564	731	15,680
Ulaanbaatar	69	7,565	5,277	219	1,246					14,410	470	16,404
Ulaanbaatar	70	6,711	4,899	492	875					13,066	613	15,303
Ulaanbaatar	71	6,202	5,252	1,216	117		481		272	13,618	545	15,823
Ulaanbaatar	72	5,402	4,282	621	378		1,004			11,772	715	13,845
Ulaanbaatar	73	6,587	5,318	453	475		1,046			14,006	754	16,538
Ulaanbaatar	74	6,594	4,925	154	244		472			12,449	457	15,320
Ulaanbaatar	75	5,465	3,346	199	118		398		802	10,392	506	14,220
Ulaanbaatar	76	6,247	4,325	252			856		947	12,739	746	15,288
Total		475,330	408,929	31,413	22,587	18,135	17,561	1,211	31,097	1,010,193	47,008	1,147,268
