= Sanjaasürengiin Oyun =

Mongolian politician

- Санжаасүрэнгийн Оюун
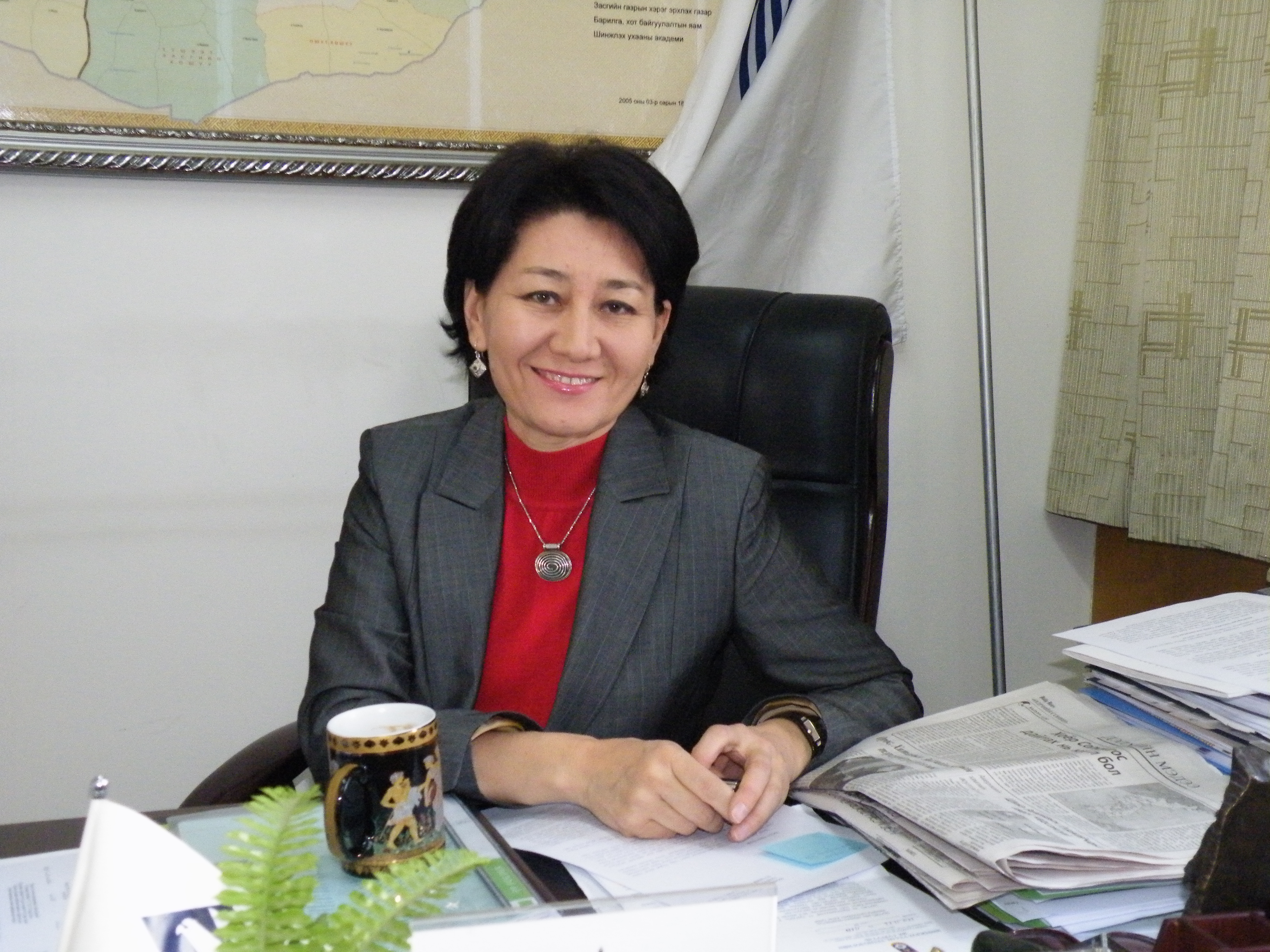
- Oyun in 2010

Chairwoman of the Civil Will Party
- In office 9 March 2000 – 12 March 2012

Chairwoman of the Civil Will–Green Party
- In office 12 March 2012 – 2018

Personal details
- Born: 18 January 1964 (age 62) Ulaanbaatar, Mongolia
- Party: Civil Will–Green Party
- Profession: President of the United Nations Environment Assembly, Geologist

Sanjaasürengiin Oyun (Mongolian: Санжаасүрэнгийн Оюун), also transcribed S. Oyun, is a Mongolian politician and geologist. She is the leader of the Civil Will Party, is the former Minister of Environment and Green Development, and has been a Member of Parliament of Mongolia (State Great Khural) since 1998. She is also a former Minister of Foreign Affairs and is the current head of the Zorig Foundation. Now she is new head of Global Water Partnership GWP. In 2003, Eisenhower Fellowships awarded Oyun a fellowship program in the United States. In 2006, Oyun was selected as a Young Global Leader (YGL) by the Davos World Economic Forum (WEF). She has been an active member of the YGL community since. On June 24, 2014, Oyun was elected the first president of the United Nations Environment Assembly (UNEA).

== Early life and education ==
Oyun was born in Ulaanbaatar in 1964. In 1987 she finished her studies in geochemistry at the Charles University of Prague. In 1996 she earned a PhD in geology from the Department of Earth Sciences at University of Cambridge. Her PhD thesis concerned "Seawater advection through oceanic crust in the Equatorial Pacific : indirect evidence from surface heat flow, sedimentary porewaters and secondary carbonates from basement".

== Career ==
Upon graduating, Oyun began working for a multinational mining company called Rio Tinto.

After the murder of her brother Sanjaasürengiin Zorig, a Mongolian pro-democracy leader, she entered politics in October 1998. She won the by-elections in her brother's constituency in Dornod, the birthplace of their father Sanjaasuren. In March 2000, she founded the Civil Will Party (Mongolian: Иргэний Зориг Нам, Irgenii Zorig Nam). The Civil Will Party held about ten percent of the public's support (as of the 2008 parliamentary elections). She served as the Vice-Speaker of Parliament (between 2004 and 2005) and the Minister of Foreign Affairs (between 2007 and 2008). Her party merged with factions of the Green Party of Mongolia in late 2011 and founded the Civil Will–Green Party, which was officially registered by the Supreme Court on 12 March 2012.

Oyun later served as the Minister of Environment and Green Development of Mongolia after the establishment of a coalition government with the Democratic Party in 2012. Since 24 June 2014, Oyun has been working as the first president of the United Nations Environment Assembly (UNEA). She retired from politics in 2018, and subsequently resigned from the post of party chairwoman.

Besides Mongolian, Oyun speaks fluently in Russian, English, and Czech.

== Other positions ==
- Zorig Foundation, Founder and Chair
- Mongolian Geological Association, President
- Down Syndrome Association of Mongolia, Chair
- Wellcome Trust, Member of the Strategic Advisory Board on Our Planet, Our Health

== Family background ==
Oyun's mother, Dorjpalam, is famous for her role as a doctor in a well-known Mongolian movie Serelt. Dorjpalam's father was the Russian geographer and scientist Simukov, who fell victim to Mongolia's political purges of the 1930s. Oyun is married with three children.

Oyun's father, Sanjaasuren, served as the dean of the Philosophy Faculty of the National University of Mongolia and as Deputy Minister of Education.
