= List of MPs elected in the 2008 Mongolian parliamentary election =

2008–2012	(2008)
2012–2016	(2012)
2016–	(2016)

This is a list of MPs elected to the State Great Khural at the 2008 parliamentary election.

== Composition at dissolution ==
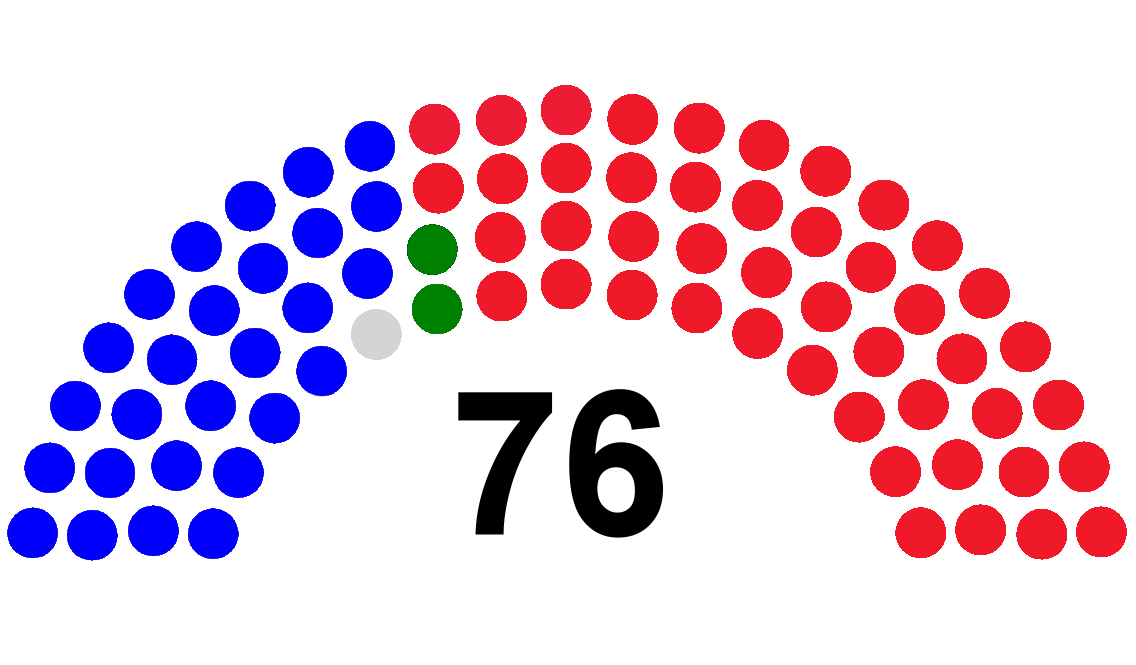
Parties in the 2008–2012 State Great Khural
Group	Seats	%
Mongolian People's Party	45	59.4
Democratic Party	27	35.8
Civil Will-Green Party	2	3.2
Independent	1	1.6
Total	76	100.0

== Constituency ==
Constituency	Name	Mongolian Name	Party
Arkhangai	Nyamjavyn Batbayar	Нямжавын Батбаяр	Democratic Party
Arkhangai	Radnaasümbereliin Gonchigdorj	Раднаасүмбэрэлийн Гончигдорж	Democratic Party
Arkhangai	Sambuugiin Lambaa	Самбуугийн Ламбаа	Democratic Party
Bayan-Ölgii	Khalidoldain Jekei	Халидолдайн Жекей	Mongolian People's Party
Bayan-Ölgii	Almalikyn Tleikhan	Алмаликын Тлейхан	Mongolian People's Party
Bayan-Ölgii	Khavdislamyn Badyelkhan	Хавдисламын Баделхан	Mongolian People's Party
Bayankhongor	Gombojavyn Zandanshatar	Гомбожавын Занданшатар	Mongolian People's Party
Bayankhongor	Batjargalyn Batbayar	Батжаргалын Батбаяр	Democratic Party
Bayankhongor	Khaltmaagiin Battulga	Халтмаагийн Баттулга	Democratic Party
Bulgan	Enebishiin Mönkh-Ochir	Энэбишийн Мөнх-Очир	Mongolian People's Party
Bulgan	Tsegmidiin Tsengel	Цэгмидийн Цэнгэл	Mongolian People's Party
Govi-Altai	Tsedeviin Dashdorj	Цэдэвийн Дашдорж	Mongolian People's Party
Govi-Altai	Jadambyn Enkhbayar	Жадамбын Энхбаяр	Mongolian People's Party
Govisümber•Dornogovi	Jamyansürengiin Batsuuri	Жамъянсүрэнгийн Батсуурь	Mongolian People's Party
Govisümber•Dornogovi	Yaichiliin Batsuuri	Яйчилийн Батсуурь	Democratic Party
Dornod	Dorjiin Odbayar	Доржийн Одбаяр	Mongolian People's Party
Dornod	Tsendiin Shinebayar	Цэндийн Шинэбаяр	Mongolian People's Party
Dornod	Püreviin Altangerel	Пүрэвийн Алтангэрэл	Democratic Party
Dundgovi	Khalzkhüügiin Narankhüü	Халзхүүгийн Наранхүү	Mongolian People's Party
Dundgovi	Radnaabazaryn Rash	Раднаабазарын Раш	Mongolian People's Party
Zavkhan	Dogsomjavyn Baldan-Ochir	Догсомжавын Балдан-Очир	Mongolian People's Party
Zavkhan	Dulamsürengiin Oyuunkhorol	Дуламсүрэнгийн Оюунхорол	Mongolian People's Party
Zavkhan	Shinensambuugiin Saikhansambuu	Шинэнсамбуугийн Сайхансамбуу	Mongolian People's Party
Övörkhangai	Danzangiin Lündeejantsan	Данзангийн Лүндээжанцан	Mongolian People's Party
Övörkhangai	Gavaagiin Batkhüü	Гаваагийн Батхүү	Democratic Party
Övörkhangai	Dashzevegiin Zorigt	Дашзэвэгийн Зоригт	Democratic Party
Övörkhangai	Zandaakhüügiin Enkhbold	Зандаахүүгийн Энхболд	Democratic Party
Ömnögovi	Khookhoryn Badamsüren	Хоохорын Бадамсүрэн	Mongolian People's Party
Ömnögovi	Tsevelmaagiin Bayarsaikhan	Цэвэлмаагийн Баярсайхан	Democratic Party
Sükhbaatar	Chültemiin Ulaan	Чүлтэмийн Улаан	Mongolian People's Party
Sükhbaatar	Rentsengiin Bud	Рэнцэнгийн Буд	Mongolian People's Party
Selenge	Ochirbatyn Chuluunbat	Очирбатын Чулуунбат	Mongolian People's Party
Selenge	Erdeniin Bat-Uul	Эрдэнийн Бат-Үүл	Democratic Party
Selenge	Sangajavyn Bayartsogt	Сангажавын Баярцогт	Democratic Party
Töv	Sunduin Batbold	Сундуйн Батболд	Mongolian People's Party
Töv	Doltsongiin Dondog	Долцонгийн Дондог	Mongolian People's Party
Töv	Miyeegombyn Enkhbold	Миеэгомбын Энхболд	Mongolian People's Party
Töv	Nyamaagiin Enkhbold	Нямаагийн Энхболд	Mongolian People's Party
Uvs	Battogtokhyn Choijilsüren	Баттогтохын Чойжилсүрэн	Mongolian People's Party
Uvs	Tsendiin Nyamdorj	Цэндийн Нямдорж	Mongolian People's Party
Uvs	Chimediin Khürelbaatar	Чимэдийн Хүрэлбаатар	Mongolian People's Party
Khovd	Sandagiin Byambatsogt	Сандагийн Бямбацогт	Mongolian People's Party
Khovd	Damdiny Demberel	Дамдины Дэмбэрэл	Mongolian People's Party
Khovd	Rinchinnyamyn Amarjargal	Ринчиннямын Амаржаргал	Democratic Party
Khövsgöl	Tserenpiliin Davaasüren	Цэрэнпилийн Даваасүрэн	Mongolian People's Party
Khövsgöl	Ölziisaikhany Enkhtüvshin	Өлзийсайханы Энхтүвшин	Mongolian People's Party
Khövsgöl	Lamjavyn Gundalai	Ламжавын Гүндалай	Democratic Party
Khövsgöl	Tserenbatyn Sedvanchig	Цэрэнбатын Сэдванчиг	Democratic Party
Khentii	Dashjamtsyn Arvin	Дашжамцын Арвин	Mongolian People's Party
Khentii	Badmaanyambuugiin Bat-Erdene	Бадмаанямбуугийн Бат-Эрдэнэ	Mongolian People's Party
Khentii	Navaansamdangiin Ganbyamba	Наваансамдангийн Ганбямба	Mongolian People's Party
Darkhan-Uul	Jamyankhorloogiin Sükhbaatar	Жамъянхорлоогийн Сүхбаатар	Mongolian People's Party
Darkhan-Uul	Damdiny Khayankhyarvaa	Дамдины Хаянхярваа	Mongolian People's Party
Darkhan-Uul	Lüimediin Gansükh	Лүймэдийн Гансүх	Democratic Party
Orkhon	Dorjdambyn Damba-Ochir	Дорждамбын Дамба-Очир	Mongolian People's Party
Orkhon	Dürzeegiin Odkhüü	Дүрзээгийн Одхүү	Democratic Party
Ulan Bator; Baganuur•Bagakhangai•Khan-Uul	Delegiin Zagdjav	Дэлэгийн Загджав	Mongolian People's Party
Ulan Bator; Baganuur•Bagakhangai•Khan-Uul	Luvsanvandangiin Bold	Лувсанвандангийн Болд	Democratic Party
Ulan Bator; Bayanzürkh•Nalaikh	Tsogtyn Batbayar	Цогтын Батбаяр	Mongolian People's Party
Ulan Bator; Bayanzürkh•Nalaikh	Davaajavyn Gankhuyag	Даваажавын Ганхуяг	Democratic Party
Ulan Bator; Bayanzürkh•Nalaikh	Chimediin Saikhanbileg	Чимэдийн Сайханбилэг	Democratic Party
Ulan Bator; Bayanzürkh•Nalaikh	Zorigiin Altai	Зоригийн Алтай	Independent
Ulan Bator; Sükhbaatar	Sanjaagiin Bayar	Санжаагийн Баяр	Mongolian People's Party
Ulan Bator; Sükhbaatar	Sükhbaataryn Batbold	Сүхбаатарын Батболд	Mongolian People's Party
Ulan Bator; Sükhbaatar	Luvsannyamyn Gantömör	Лувсаннямын Гантөмөр	Democratic Party
Ulan Bator; Chingeltei	Tsakhiagiin Elbegdorj	Цахиагийн Элбэгдорж	Democratic Party
Ulan Bator; Chingeltei	Garidkhüügiin Bayarsaikhan	Гарьдхүүгийн Баярсайхан	Democratic Party
Ulan Bator; Chingeltei	Dagvadorjiin Ochirbat	Дагвадоржийн Очирбат	Mongolian People's Party
Ulan Bator; Bayangol	Tsendiin Mönkh-Orgil	Цэндийн Мөнх-Оргил	Mongolian People's Party
Ulan Bator; Bayangol	Khishigdembereliin Temüüjin	Хишигдэмбэрэлийн Тэмүүжин	Democratic Party
Ulan Bator; Bayangol	Dangaasurengiin Enkhbat	Дангаасүрэнгийн Энхбат	Civil Will-Green Party
Ulan Bator; Bayangol	Sodnomzunduin Erdene	Содномзундуйн Эрдэнэ	Democratic Party
Ulan Bator; Songino Khairkhan	Dendeviin Terbishdagva	Дэндэвийн Тэрбишдагва	Mongolian People's Party
Ulan Bator; Songino Khairkhan	Norovyn Altankhuyag	Норовын Алтанхуяг	Democratic Party
Ulan Bator; Songino Khairkhan	Davaagiin Batbayar	Даваагийн Батбаяр	Democratic Party
Ulan Bator; Songino Khairkhan	Sanjaasürengiin Oyuun	Санжаасүрэнгийн Оюун	Civil Will-Green Party

== Changes & by-elections ==
- Dashdorjiin Zorigt (June 2009, vacated by Tsakhiagiin Elbegdorj)
