= 2008 Mongolian parliamentary election =

- 29 June 2008
- All 76 seats in the State Great Khural; 39 seats needed for a majority
- Turnout: 76.46% (▼5.38pp)
Party	Leader	Vote %	Seats	+/–
MPRP	Sanjiin Bayar	43.09	45	+9
Democratic	Tsakhiagiin Elbegdorj	39.24	28	+2
Civic Coalition	Dangaasürengiin Enkhbat	4.29	1	New
Civil Will	Sanjaasürengiin Oyuun	3.49	1	−1
Independents	–	5.24	1	−2
This lists parties that won seats. See the complete results below.
Results by constituency
Prime Minister before	Prime Minister after
Sanjaagiin Bayar; MPRP	Sanjaagiin Bayar; MPRP

Parliamentary elections were held in Mongolia on 29 June 2008. A total of 356 candidates ran for the 76 seats in the State Great Khural. According to official results, 45 seats were won by the ruling Mongolian People's Revolutionary Party (MPRP), and 28 seats by the main opposition party, the Democratic Party (DP). Minor gains were made by the Civic Coalition (between the Mongolian Green Party, the Civil Movement Party, and the Mongolian Social Democratic Party), the Civil Will Party, and an independent politician.

The elections were held using plurality block voting system, re-introduced in 2005 and previously used to conduct two parliamentary elections. Election turnout was at 76.46%, slight drop from the last election. Concerns for electoral fraud by the ruling MPRP were raised by opposition parties after preliminary results on 30 June showed the MPRP leading with 47 seats over the DP's 27 seats. On 1 July 2008, peaceful protests in Ulaanbaatar, the capital city, escalated into riots. A state of emergency was declared by president Nambaryn Enkhbayar to control the upheaval. However, the curfew led to the fatal shooting of five people and arrests of several hundred people.

In response to the alleged fraud and human rights abuse, the DP announced a boycott of the plenary session on 18 July 2008. Parliamentary quorum was fulfilled on 28 August 2008 after a month of opposition boycott. Sitting prime minister and MPRP leader Sanjiin Bayar was re-appointed as head of government in September 2008 and subsequently formed a unity government between the MPRP and the DP.

== Background ==
In the 2004 parliamentary election, the Mongolian People's Revolutionary Party (MPRP) lost 36 of its previous 72 parliamentary seats. 34 seats were secured by the Motherland Democratic Coalition (MDC), a coalition between the parliamentary opposition parties—the Democratic Party (DP), the Motherland–Mongolian Democratic New Socialist Party (M-MDNSP) and the Civil Will–Republican Party (CWRP). Two seats were disputed and remained vacant until late 2005, when each of it were won by the MPRP and the DP.

The election resulted in a hung parliament, where the MPRP had 36 seats, the MDC 34, the Republican Party 1, and independents (affiliated with the DP) 3. Both major parties were below the required threshold of 39 seats for a clear majority to govern. Consequently, a power-sharing agreement to form a grand coalition government was made by the MPRP and the MDC in August 2004. Outgoing prime minister and MPRP chair Nambaryn Enkhbayar was sworn in as the Chairman of the State Great Khural (speaker) on 13 August 2004 while former prime minister of the DP, Tsakhiagiin Elbegdorj, was appointed the 23rd Prime Minister of Mongolia on 20 August 2004.

In December 2004, the MDC was dissolved by its own leadership due to various disputes regarding the upcoming presidential election, the coalition government, and factional interests. The dissolution was opposed by several DP and M-MDNSP lawmakers. Infighting between party chair Enkhsaikhan and Radnaasümbereliin Gonchigdorj who headed a faction of his former Social Democrat colleagues led to Enkhsaikhan stepping down as party chair in December 2004. Enkhsaikhan was succeeded by Gonchigdorj as DP leader. With the MDC dissolution, the MDC caucus with 37 lawmakers was also disestablished. In January 2005, 26 lawmakers from the DP and the CWRP (not eligible to form their own caucus) joined the MPRP majority floor to "coordinate parliamentary efforts" while 12 others refused the decision. Later in August 2005, the MPRP caucus began working independently of non-party members following a consensus between the MPRP and the DP.

In the 2005 presidential election, Nambaryn Enkhbayar, candidate of the MPRP, was overwhelmingly elected the 3rd President of Mongolia in a four-way race, defeating the DP, the M-MDNSP, and the RP candidates with 54% of the ballot. The DP chairman and candidate, Mendsaikhany Enkhsaikhan, received 20% of the vote, mainly due to vote splitting by the two minor parties. President-elect Enkhbayar's roles as speaker and party chair was assumed by Tsendiin Nyamdorj and mayor of Ulaanbaatar Miyeegombyn Enkhbold, respectively.

In late 2005, four DP lawmakers crossed the floor to the MPRP whilst deputy DP chair Lamjavyn Gündalai founded his own party, the People's Party, due to disagreements with party chair Gonchigdorj's faction and coalition government.

With the support of DP dissenters and minor parties, 10 MPRP ministers, who made up around 80% of the cabinet, resigned en masse on 11 January 2006. On 25 January 2006, MPRP chairman Miyeegombyn Enkhbold was elected the next prime minister by the legislature. He formed a MPRP-led "nationaly unity" government with DP dissidents led by Enkhsaikhan, the M-MDNSP, the RP, and the People's Party. However, Enkhbold himself was replaced by Sanjiin Bayar as party chair at the 25th Party Congress in October 2007 and later as prime minister in November 2007. Bayar formed a similar coalition government with NNP, the M-MDNSP, and the Civil Will Party, seeking to uproot corruption and bureaucracy.

== Electoral system ==
Members of the State Great Khural were to be elected from multi-seat constituencies in a plurality-at-large system, with two to four seats per aimag (provinces) or düüreg (municipal districts of Ulaanbaatar). Previous elections of 2000 and 2004 were held using first-past-the-post voting system with single-seat constituencies. The electoral law introduced the more complicated voting system, previously used in 1992 and 1996, and was reported to have led to a delay in vote counting.

Of the 76 seats, 20 were elected from Ulaanbaatar, and the other 56 were elected from the 21 aimags. Mongolian voter registration is coupled with civil registration. Vote counting was manually done by hands and was not publicly done, and results of individual polling stations were not published. After the electoral disputes in some constituencies during the 2004 election, Mongolian voters were required to mark their thumbs after casting their vote.

== Political parties ==
=== Parliamentary parties ===
In the 2004 parliamentary election, five political parties (three of them in a coalition) and three independents were elected to the State Great Khural. By June 2004, the outgoing parliament consisted of six parties—the Mongolian People's Revolutionary Party, the Democratic Party, the Motherland Party, the Civil Will Party, the Republican Party, and the New National Party; latter was founded by four lawmakers in 2006. The People's Party, established by DP lawmaker Lamjavyn Gündalai in late 2005, briefly held a seat in parliament until May 2008, when Gündalai left the party and returned to the DP.

Name		Party leader	Floor leader	Ideology	Position	2004 election		At dissolution
Name		Party leader	Floor leader	Ideology	Position	Votes (%)	Seats	At dissolution
MPRP	Mongolian People's Revolutionary Party	Sanjiin Bayar		Social democracy	Centre-left	48.9%	37 / 76	39 / 76
DP	Democratic Party	Tsakhiagiin Elbegdorj		Liberal conservatism	Centre-right	44.9%	26 / 76	26 / 76
MP	Motherland Party (Note: Changed name from "Motherland–Mongolian Democratic New Socialist Party" to "Motherland Party" in mid 2005.)	Badarchiin Erdenebat		Social democracy	Centre-left	44.9%	7 / 76	4 / 76
NNP	New National Party	Mendsaikhany Enkhsaikhan		Mongolian nationalism	Centre	44.9%	0 / 76	4 / 76
CWP	Civil Will Party (Note: Changed name from "Civil Will–Republican Party" to "Civil WIll Party" in 2006.)	Sanjaasürengiin Oyun		Liberalism	Centre-right	44.9%	2 / 76	2 / 76
RP	Republican Party	Bazarsadyn Jargalsaikhan		Conservatism	Centre-right	1.4%	1 / 76	1 / 76

=== Contesting parties ===
356 candidates were officially registered by the General Election Commission of Mongolia for the election, of whom 28 of them were incumbents, 45 were independents and 311 were from the following 11 political parties and 1 coalition:

Party
Mongolian People's Revolutionary Party
Democratic Party
Civil Will Party
Civic Coalition (MGP, Civil Movement Party, MSDP)
Mongolian Traditional United Party
Motherland Party
Mongolian Liberal Party
Republican Party
New National Party
Freedom Implementing Party
Development Programme Party
Mongolian Democratic Movement Party

== Campaign ==
Key issues in the upcoming election included the development of Mongolia's largely impoverished agriculture industry and mineral deals regarding its booming mining sector. One of the most significant of these long-awaited agreements was the $38 billion Oyu Tolgoi copper deposit project, in partnership with the Canadian company Ivanhoe Mines. While the project promised substantial revenue to Mongolia's GDP, it also raised public fears regarding potential foreign exploitation and environmental damage.

In May 2006, protestors against the project burned an effigy of Robert Friedland, owner of Ivanhoe Mines, and demanded that the companies pay higher taxes. In response to these demonstrations, the government enacted a new mining tax law allowing it to impose taxes of 68% on gold profits when it exceeds $500 per ounce and copper over $2,600 per tonne. Up until then, the government of Mongolia was firmly in support of foreign-run mining companies. However, delays in government approvals, changes in mining regulation, and unstable politics ultimately caused many companies to pull out or reschedule their projects. The regulation of foreign involvement in Mongolia's mining sector has remained a subject of controversy. Both major parties supported the mining agreement, but the MPRP favored a more state-controlled approach, whilst the DP advocated a more pro-market framework.

Both the DP and the MPRP promised cash payouts in case of an election win. The DP promised 1,000,000 MNT (about 800 USD) per person in case of an election win. After first denouncing the idea of such payouts, the MPRP changed course and promised 1,500,000 MNT per person. Other issues were inflation and mining. As in previous elections, there were instances of candidates making monetary payments and other gifts to lure voters.

Prior to the election, more than 116,000 registered voters were listed twice (under different addresses), the General Election Commission affirmed it would be fixed prior to election day.

== Results ==
According to results published on 14 July, the MPRP won at least 39 seats, the DP won at least 25, at least one seat was going to the Civic Will Party, and three seats were won by independent candidates. However, results from three constituencies (Khentii, Dornod, and Bayangol) were delayed. On 20 August, final results from Khentii were officially published, raising the number of MPRP seats to 45. Turnout was 76.46%, considerably lower than the 82% of the 2004 elections.

Party	Votes	%	Seats	+/–
Mongolian People's Revolutionary Party	1,534,033	43.09	45	+8
Democratic Party	1,397,011	39.24	28	+2
Civic Coalition	152,860	4.29	1	New
Civil Will Party	124,367	3.49	1	–1
New National Party	60,357	1.70	0	New
Motherland Party	43,380	1.22	0	–7
Republican Party	40,959	1.15	0	–1
Mongolian Traditional United Party	11,974	0.34	0	0
Mongolian Democratic Movement Party	6,193	0.17	0	New
Freedom Implementing Party	1,358	0.04	0	New
Mongolian Liberal Party	393	0.01	0	0
Development Programme Party	255	0.01	0	New
Independents	186,596	5.24	1	–2
Total	3,559,736	100.00	76	0
Valid votes	1,160,601	98.38		
Invalid/blank votes	19,128	1.62		
Total votes	1,179,729	100.00		
Registered voters/turnout	1,542,905	76.46		
Source: General Election Commission

=== Results by constituency ===
Results by constituency

Constituency 1. Arkhangai
Candidate	Party	Votes	%
N. Batbayar	Democratic Party	23,782	55.48
R. Gonchigdorj	Democratic Party	21,186	49.43
S. Lambaa	Democratic Party	20,687	48.26
N. Udval	Mongolian People's Revolutionary Party	20,392	47.57
S. Tömör-Ochir	Mongolian People's Revolutionary Party	16,975	39.60
B. Jargalsaykhan	Mongolian People's Revolutionary Party	14,854	34.65
Ts. Tsolmon	New National Party	6,635	15.48
B. Gantylga	Civic Coalition	552	1.29
Sh. Sükhbat	Civic Coalition	407	0.95
Z. Jargalmaa	Civil Will Party	350	0.82
D. Bayaraa	Civil Will Party	300	0.70
Total		126,120	100.00
Valid votes		42,864	98.42
Invalid/blank votes		688	1.58
Total votes		43,552	100.00
Registered voters/turnout		54,472	79.95

Constituency 2. Bayan-Ölgii
Candidate	Party	Votes	%
Kh. Jyekyey	Mongolian People's Revolutionary Party	23,257	56.47
A. Tyelyeykhan	Mongolian People's Revolutionary Party	22,967	55.76
Kh. Badyelkhan	Mongolian People's Revolutionary Party	20,583	49.97
A. Bakyey	Democratic Party	16,208	39.35
A. Murat	Democratic Party	14,261	34.62
K. Sayran	Independent	12,624	30.65
Kh. Yerjan	Democratic Party	10,174	24.70
L. Altankhuyag	Civil Will Party	1,595	3.87
Total		121,669	100.00
Valid votes		41,188	97.10
Invalid/blank votes		1,229	2.90
Total votes		42,417	100.00
Registered voters/turnout		52,543	80.73

Constituency 3. Bayankhongor
Candidate	Party	Votes	%
Kh. Battulga	Democratic Party	21,122	54.71
G. Zandanshatar	Mongolian People's Revolutionary Party	19,895	51.53
B. Batbayar	Democratic Party	17,717	45.89
S. Bayarmönkh	Mongolian People's Revolutionary Party	17,500	45.33
D. Ganbat	Democratic Party	15,762	40.82
P. Zorigtbaatar	Mongolian People's Revolutionary Party	13,586	35.19
M. Khürelsükh	Civil Will Party	5,498	14.24
D. Enkhmaa	Independent	1,632	4.23
Ts. Jargal	Motherland Party	1,048	2.71
M. Enkhtör	Mongolian Democratic Movement Party	184	0.48
Total		113,944	100.00
Valid votes		38,610	98.43
Invalid/blank votes		616	1.57
Total votes		39,226	100.00
Registered voters/turnout		48,500	80.88

Constituency 4. Bulgan
Candidate	Party	Votes	%
E. Mönkh-Ochir	Mongolian People's Revolutionary Party	17,121	62.91
Ts. Tsengel	Mongolian People's Revolutionary Party	11,514	42.31
Ya. Erkhembayar	Democratic Party	7,441	27.34
P. Mendbayar	Independent	5,370	19.73
B. Batsaykhan	Republican Party	4,954	18.20
D. Mönkhsaykhan	Democratic Party	3,822	14.04
D. Ölziysaykhan	Civil Will Party	2,973	10.92
Total		53,195	100.00
Valid votes		27,213	98.36
Invalid/blank votes		453	1.64
Total votes		27,666	100.00
Registered voters/turnout		34,223	80.84

Constituency 5. Govi-Altai
Candidate	Party	Votes	%
J. Enkhbayar	Mongolian People's Revolutionary Party	19,015	68.06
Ts. Dashdorj	Mongolian People's Revolutionary Party	17,699	63.35
B. Ariunsan	Democratic Party	10,054	35.99
O. Semer	Democratic Party	6,372	22.81
B. Oyuunbileg	Motherland Party	984	3.52
Ts. Gonchigsüren	Civic Coalition	595	2.13
Total		54,719	100.00
Valid votes		27,937	98.84
Invalid/blank votes		327	1.16
Total votes		28,264	100.00
Registered voters/turnout		34,313	82.37

Constituency 6. Govisümber and Dornogovi
Candidate	Party	Votes	%
Ya. Batsuuri	Democratic Party	17,768	55.16
J. Batsuuri	Mongolian People's Revolutionary Party	15,013	46.60
D. Tuyaa	Mongolian People's Revolutionary Party	14,964	46.45
P. Gankhuyag	Democratic Party	12,812	39.77
G. Battulga	Republican Party	718	2.23
G. Bayanjargal	Mongolian Traditional United Party	569	1.77
D. Batdelger	Civil Will Party	513	1.59
Kh. Chuluunbaatar	Republican Party	411	1.28
Total		62,768	100.00
Valid votes		32,214	98.79
Invalid/blank votes		395	1.21
Total votes		32,609	100.00
Registered voters/turnout		43,108	75.64

Constituency 7. Dornod
Candidate	Party	Votes	%
Ts. Shinebayar	Mongolian People's Revolutionary Party	13,782	40.74
P. Altangerel	Democratic Party	13,356	39.48
D. Odbayar	Mongolian People's Revolutionary Party	13,039	38.54
M. Zorigt	Civil Will Party	11,989	35.44
Ts. Janlav	Mongolian People's Revolutionary Party	11,618	34.34
B. Mönkhtsetseg	Democratic Party	11,498	33.98
B. Otgonbat	Democratic Party	11,092	32.78
M. Choydorj	Civil Will Party	6,808	20.12
Ts. Davaadorj	Republican Party	3,503	10.35
D. Bazargür	Motherland Party	630	1.86
D. Lkhaajav	Mongolian Traditional United Party	398	1.18
Total		97,713	100.00
Valid votes		33,833	98.09
Invalid/blank votes		660	1.91
Total votes		34,493	100.00
Registered voters/turnout		45,653	75.55

Constituency 8. Dundgovi
Candidate	Party	Votes	%
Kh. Narankhüü	Mongolian People's Revolutionary Party	11,971	54.23
R. Pash	Mongolian People's Revolutionary Party	10,558	47.83
Ts. Gankhüü	New National Party	9,373	42.46
B. Delgermaa	Democratic Party	8,101	36.70
L. Tserensodnom	Democratic Party	2,388	10.82
D. Jargalsaykhan	Civil Will Party	775	3.51
Total		43,166	100.00
Valid votes		22,075	98.59
Invalid/blank votes		316	1.41
Total votes		22,391	100.00
Registered voters/turnout		27,506	81.40

Constituency 9. Zavkhan
Candidate	Party	Votes	%
D. Baldan-Ochir	Mongolian People's Revolutionary Party	21,309	57.71
Sh. Saykhansambuu	Mongolian People's Revolutionary Party	17,989	48.72
D. Oyuunkhorol	Mongolian People's Revolutionary Party	17,589	47.64
Ya. Sanjmyatav	Democratic Party	16,167	43.79
Z. Narantyyaa	Democratic Party	12,386	33.55
Ch. Sodnomtseren	Democratic Party	9,458	25.62
E. Gür-Aranz	Independent	8,363	22.65
L. Mönkhsaykhan	Civil Will Party	1,528	4.14
B. Nyamsüren	Republican Party	1,100	2.98
S. Mönkhbat	Motherland Party	690	1.87
Z. Tserendylam	Independent	550	1.49
Ts. Shirendev	Civic Coalition	527	1.43
D. Tümenkhüü	Independent	323	0.87
Yo. Terbish	Civic Coalition	192	0.52
Total		108,171	100.00
Valid votes		36,923	98.92
Invalid/blank votes		403	1.08
Total votes		37,326	100.00
Registered voters/turnout		46,623	80.06

Constituency 10. Övörkhangai
Candidate	Party	Votes	%
G. Batkhüü	Democratic Party	29,309	55.44
D. Zorigt	Democratic Party	27,776	52.54
Z. Enkhbold	Democratic Party	26,003	49.19
D. Lündeejantsan	Mongolian People's Revolutionary Party	25,685	48.59
S. Chinzorig	Mongolian People's Revolutionary Party	25,510	48.25
G. Shiylegdamba	Mongolian People's Revolutionary Party	25,432	48.11
Ya. Sodbaatar	Mongolian People's Revolutionary Party	23,678	44.79
R. Badamdamdin	Democratic Party	21,583	40.83
S. Bekhbat	Civil Will Party	836	1.58
S. Dorjdulam	Independent	415	0.79
R. Erdene	Civic Coalition	296	0.56
Total		206,523	100.00
Valid votes		52,866	97.89
Invalid/blank votes		1,141	2.11
Total votes		54,007	100.00
Registered voters/turnout		70,204	76.93

Constituency 11. Ömnögovi
Candidate	Party	Votes	%
Kh. Badamsüren	Mongolian People's Revolutionary Party	13,617	54.71
Ts. Bayarsaykhan	Democratic Party	10,103	40.59
D. Bat-Erdene	Democratic Party	9,469	38.04
Ts. Oyuynbaatar	Mongolian People's Revolutionary Party	9,215	37.02
L. Enkhbold	Independent	4,281	17.20
B. Tsedensamba	New National Party	1,068	4.29
J. Avarzed	Independent	425	1.71
Ts. Batchimeg	Civic Coalition	385	1.55
T. Tüvshinjargal	Mongolian Traditional United Party	239	0.96
B. Magsar	Civil Will Party	238	0.96
Total		49,040	100.00
Valid votes		24,890	99.00
Invalid/blank votes		252	1.00
Total votes		25,142	100.00
Registered voters/turnout		31,036	81.01

Constituency 12. Sükhbaatar
Candidate	Party	Votes	%
Ch. Ulaan	Mongolian People's Revolutionary Party	18,246	65.15
R. Bud	Mongolian People's Revolutionary Party	14,117	50.40
L. Erdenechimeg	Democratic Party	10,078	35.98
D. Tsogtbaatar	Democratic Party	8,410	30.03
D. Delgertsogt	New National Party	3,443	12.29
B. Bud	Civil Will Party	679	2.42
M. Ariunbat	Mongolian Traditional United Party	285	1.02
Total		55,258	100.00
Valid votes		28,008	98.29
Invalid/blank votes		488	1.71
Total votes		28,496	100.00
Registered voters/turnout		34,042	83.71

Constituency 13. Selenge
Candidate	Party	Votes	%
S. Bayartsogt	Democratic Party	25,941	58.30
O. Chuluunbat	Mongolian People's Revolutionary Party	23,944	53.81
E. Bat-Üül	Democratic Party	22,016	49.48
D. Nasanjargal	Mongolian People's Revolutionary Party	18,781	42.21
Ts. Sükhbaatar	Democratic Party	18,557	41.71
J. Bayarmagnay	Mongolian People's Revolutionary Party	18,419	41.40
S. Chuluunbaatar	Civil Will Party	1,001	2.25
Ch. Enkhtuyaa	Civil Will Party	909	2.04
P. Chinbat	Civil Will Party	627	1.41
T. Chimeddorj	Mongolian Democratic Movement Party	601	1.35
Total		130,796	100.00
Valid votes		44,495	98.46
Invalid/blank votes		697	1.54
Total votes		45,192	100.00
Registered voters/turnout		60,945	74.15

Constituency 14. Töv
Candidate	Party	Votes	%
M. Enkhbold	Mongolian People's Revolutionary Party	23,051	58.73
N. Enkhbold	Mongolian People's Revolutionary Party	22,857	58.24
S. Batbold	Mongolian People's Revolutionary Party	22,599	57.58
D. Dondog	Mongolian People's Revolutionary Party	17,693	45.08
D. Dorjpürev	Democratic Party	15,838	40.36
Sh. Sükhbaatar	Democratic Party	15,455	39.38
Kh. Zoljargal	Democratic Party	14,615	37.24
Sh. Battsetseg	Democratic Party	12,655	32.25
G. Ayuylgüy	Civic Coalition	2,784	7.09
P. Odonchimeg	Independent	2,352	5.99
L. Sükhbaatar	Civil Will Party	1,259	3.21
S. Jargalsaykhan	Civil Will Party	798	2.03
Ch. Oyuyngerel	Mongolian Traditional United Party	594	1.51
Total		152,550	100.00
Valid votes		39,246	98.38
Invalid/blank votes		646	1.62
Total votes		39,892	100.00
Registered voters/turnout		53,593	74.44

Constituency 15. Uvs
Candidate	Party	Votes	%
Ch. Khürelbaatar	Mongolian People's Revolutionary Party	23,985	62.39
B. Choyjilsüren	Mongolian People's Revolutionary Party	22,044	57.34
Ts. Nyamdorj	Mongolian People's Revolutionary Party	21,198	55.14
D. Dorligjav	Democratic Party	17,954	46.70
Ch. Byambaa	Democratic Party	14,919	38.81
L. Dügerjav	Democratic Party	13,465	35.03
N. Tömörbaatar	Mongolian Democratic Movement Party	150	0.39
Total		113,715	100.00
Valid votes		38,442	97.93
Invalid/blank votes		813	2.07
Total votes		39,255	100.00
Registered voters/turnout		46,974	83.57

Constituency 16. Khovd
Candidate	Party	Votes	%
S. Byambatsogt	Mongolian People's Revolutionary Party	19,344	52.08
D. Demberel	Mongolian People's Revolutionary Party	15,708	42.29
R. Amarjargal	Democratic Party	14,998	40.38
G. Nyamdavaa	Mongolian People's Revolutionary Party	12,188	32.82
N. Khürelsükh	Democratic Party	10,196	27.45
T. Lkhagvaa	Democratic Party	9,691	26.09
B. Batbold	Independent	8,933	24.05
D. Battsogt	New National Party	7,942	21.38
I. Erdenebaatar	Motherland Party	3,598	9.69
K. Khanagat	Independent	2,623	7.06
L. Galbadrakh	New National Party	1,341	3.61
T. Bayarkhüü	Civic Coalition	746	2.01
T. Khüderchuluun	Civil Will Party	337	0.91
L. Damba	Mongolian Traditional United Party	194	0.52
Total		107,839	100.00
Valid votes		37,140	97.95
Invalid/blank votes		777	2.05
Total votes		37,917	100.00
Registered voters/turnout		47,700	79.49

Constituency 17. Khövsgöl
Candidate	Party	Votes	%
L. Gündalai	Democratic Party	30,224	52.73
Ts. Sedvaanchig	Democratic Party	29,756	51.92
Ö. Enkhtüvshin	Mongolian People's Revolutionary Party	26,232	45.77
Ts. Davaasüren	Mongolian People's Revolutionary Party	26,177	45.67
J. Tsolmon	Mongolian People's Revolutionary Party	25,359	44.25
Ts. Oyuungerel	Democratic Party	24,096	42.04
R. Khadbaatar	Mongolian People's Revolutionary Party	23,416	40.86
O. Otgonsaykhan	Democratic Party	23,328	40.70
B. Erdenebat	Motherland Party	11,521	20.10
R. Odonbaatar	Civil Will Party	854	1.49
S. Khürelbaatar	Mongolian Traditional United Party	595	1.04
B. Gansükh	Mongolian Democratic Movement Party	265	0.46
S. Baasanjav	Mongolian Democratic Movement Party	152	0.27
Total		221,975	100.00
Valid votes		57,314	98.39
Invalid/blank votes		939	1.61
Total votes		58,253	100.00
Registered voters/turnout		74,668	78.02

Constituency 18. Khentii
Candidate	Party	Votes	%
N. Ganbyamba	Mongolian People's Revolutionary Party	16,153	50.52
B. Bat-Erdene	Mongolian People's Revolutionary Party	15,710	49.14
D. Arvin	Mongolian People's Revolutionary Party	14,161	44.29
B. Garamgaybaatar	Democratic Party	13,542	42.36
D. Ganbold	Democratic Party	13,191	41.26
S. Mendsaykhan	Democratic Party	10,794	33.76
S. Jargal	Independent	7,342	22.96
G. Yanjinlkham	Civic Coalition	961	3.01
D. Odgerel	Mongolian Traditional United Party	444	1.39
S. Gankhyyag	Civic Coalition	395	1.24
D. Chylyynbileg	Civil Will Party	342	1.07
J. Lkhamsüren	Independent	283	0.89
Total		93,318	100.00
Valid votes		31,971	98.24
Invalid/blank votes		573	1.76
Total votes		32,544	100.00
Registered voters/turnout		42,150	77.21

Constituency 19. Darkhan-Uul
Candidate	Party	Votes	%
L. Gansükh	Democratic Party	19,679	50.18
D. Khayankhyarvaa	Mongolian People's Revolutionary Party	17,259	44.01
J. Sükhbaatar	Mongolian People's Revolutionary Party	14,823	37.80
B. Battömör	Mongolian People's Revolutionary Party	12,589	32.10
B. Batmönkh	Independent	9,866	25.16
Sh. Tüvdendorj	Democratic Party	8,267	21.08
M. Sonompil	New National Party	7,957	20.29
M. Ichinnorov	Civic Coalition	7,181	18.31
B. Boldbaatar	Independent	3,771	9.62
D. Enkhtuyaa	Democratic Party	3,360	8.57
G. Arslan	Independent	2,625	6.69
Ts. Mönkhjargal	Civil Will Party	2,415	6.16
Ch. Chuluuntsetseg	Independent	1,416	3.61
D. Tümenjargal	Republican Party	1,094	2.79
Sh. Pürevsüren	Civic Coalition	969	2.47
B. Tserenbaljir	Motherland Party	672	1.71
B. Batsaykhan	Civic Coalition	369	0.94
R. Tömörbaatar	Mongolian Democratic Movement Party	327	0.83
Total		114,639	100.00
Valid votes		39,213	98.63
Invalid/blank votes		546	1.37
Total votes		39,759	100.00
Registered voters/turnout		49,361	80.55

Constituency 20. Orkhon
Candidate	Party	Votes	%
D. Damba-Ochir	Mongolian People's Revolutionary Party	19,511	48.78
D. Odkhüü	Democratic Party	19,195	47.99
G. Sharkhüü	Mongolian People's Revolutionary Party	15,376	38.44
D. Oyuuntsetseg	Democratic Party	10,031	25.08
B. Batzul	Civil Will Party	5,919	14.80
D. Enkhtayvan	Independent	2,449	6.12
B. Nasanbayar	New National Party	2,384	5.96
D. Enkhmandakh	Independent	1,091	2.73
T. Tsog	Republican Party	873	2.18
J. Tsogtgerel	Civic Coalition	745	1.86
L. Byambajargal	Civic Coalition	416	1.04
S. Enkhbat	Mongolian Democratic Movement Party	303	0.76
T. Altankhuyag	New National Party	280	0.70
D. Dondovsambuu	Development Programme Party	255	0.64
Total		78,828	100.00
Valid votes		39,995	99.08
Invalid/blank votes		371	0.92
Total votes		40,366	100.00
Registered voters/turnout		54,987	73.41

Constituency 21. Khan Uul, Bagakhangai and Baganuur
Candidate	Party	Votes	%
L. Bold	Democratic Party	20,135	37.43
D. Zagdjav	Mongolian People's Revolutionary Party	18,132	33.71
D. Idevkhten	Mongolian People's Revolutionary Party	18,127	33.70
D. Erdenebat	Democratic Party	16,877	31.38
N. Davaa	Civic Coalition	16,701	31.05
P. Bold	Independent	4,276	7.95
J. Zanaa	Independent	2,829	5.26
Ya. Battsetseg	New National Party	2,558	4.76
N. Chuluunbaatar	Motherland Party	1,937	3.60
E. Zorigt	Civic Coalition	1,682	3.13
O. Erdenebulgan	New National Party	1,581	2.94
D. Baasan	Mongolian Democratic Movement Party	254	0.47
Ts. Bolormaa	Mongolian Traditional United Party	251	0.47
Ts. Enkhbayar	Mongolian Traditional United Party	233	0.43
Total		105,573	100.00
Valid votes		53,790	98.31
Invalid/blank votes		926	1.69
Total votes		54,716	100.00
Registered voters/turnout		72,781	75.18

Constituency 22. Bayanzürkh and Nalaikh
Candidate	Party	Votes	%
Z. Altay	Independent	60,320	56.94
Ch. Saikhanbileg	Democratic Party	55,790	52.66
Ts. Batbayar	Mongolian People's Revolutionary Party	41,542	39.21
D. Gankhuyag	Democratic Party	37,321	35.23
T. Gandi	Mongolian People's Revolutionary Party	36,851	34.79
J. Batzandan	Civic Coalition	35,373	33.39
T. Gantömör	Mongolian People's Revolutionary Party	29,784	28.12
B. Mönkhtuyaa	Democratic Party	26,607	25.12
Ya. Ayuushjav	Mongolian People's Revolutionary Party	21,719	20.50
S. Otgonbayar	Motherland Party	21,425	20.22
I. Narantuyaa	Democratic Party	16,003	15.11
Ch. Bazar	Civil Will Party	5,007	4.73
D. Basandorj	Civic Coalition	3,178	3.00
Ts. Gankhyyag	Republican Party	2,910	2.75
U. Burmaa	Civic Coalition	2,763	2.61
G. Baasan	Independent	2,627	2.48
N. Oyuyntsetseg	Independent	2,180	2.06
G. Byambatulga	Mongolian Traditional United Party	1,812	1.71
G. Tserenchynt	Independent	1,557	1.47
D. Gantör	Independent	1,440	1.36
B. Batbold	Mongolian Traditional United Party	1,411	1.33
Ö. Mendsaykhan	Civic Coalition	1,342	1.27
B. Otgontsetseg	New National Party	1,220	1.15
J. Batkhyyag	New National Party	853	0.81
N. Amarbayasgalan	Independent	763	0.72
D. Otgonbat	Independent	681	0.64
L. Erdenetyyl	Mongolian Democratic Movement Party	577	0.54
D. Chylyynbat	Freedom Implementing Party	566	0.53
G. Ganbold	Republican Party	493	0.47
B. Ganbat	Mongolian Traditional United Party	477	0.45
B. Enkhbayar	Mongolian Traditional United Party	394	0.37
M. Bayarbat	Independent	344	0.32
B. Pürevjargal	Republican Party	323	0.30
D. Tsolmon	Mongolian Democratic Movement Party	274	0.26
Total		415,927	100.00
Valid votes		105,936	98.43
Invalid/blank votes		1,685	1.57
Total votes		107,621	100.00
Registered voters/turnout		158,467	67.91

Constituency 23. Sükhbaatar
Candidate	Party	Votes	%
S. Bayar	Mongolian People's Revolutionary Party	29,941	61.94
S. Batbold	Mongolian People's Revolutionary Party	23,080	47.75
L. Gantömör	Democratic Party	22,043	45.60
D. Battulga	Democratic Party	14,736	30.49
D. Nyamkhüü	Democratic Party	14,390	29.77
M. Chimgee	Mongolian People's Revolutionary Party	13,268	27.45
B. Lkhagvajav	Independent	10,124	20.95
B. Boldsaykhan	Civil Will Party	4,522	9.36
M. Enkhsaikhan	New National Party	3,445	7.13
Kh. Bat-Yalalt	Mongolian Traditional United Party	1,294	2.68
Ch. Chimedsüren	Civic Coalition	1,162	2.40
B. Bolormaa	Republican Party	1,127	2.33
Ts. Mönkhjin	New National Party	861	1.78
O. Zayaa	Independent	732	1.51
B. Sükhee	Civic Coalition	433	0.90
Kh. Oyuuntsetseg	Independent	406	0.84
Kh. Maam	Civic Coalition	366	0.76
D. Ulambayar	Motherland Party	276	0.57
D. Khürelsükh	Mongolian Democratic Movement Party	258	0.53
O. Selenge	Independent	186	0.38
D. Badarch	Mongolian Traditional United Party	144	0.30
S. Sükhee	Mongolian Traditional United Party	126	0.26
Total		142,920	100.00
Valid votes		48,335	98.27
Invalid/blank votes		853	1.73
Total votes		49,188	100.00
Registered voters/turnout		67,999	72.34

Constituency 24. Chingeltei
Candidate	Party	Votes	%
Ts. Elbegdorj	Democratic Party	30,893	54.82
D. Ochirbat	Mongolian People's Revolutionary Party	20,296	36.01
G. Bayarsaykhan	Democratic Party	20,031	35.54
R. Burmaa	Democratic Party	19,754	35.05
L. Odonchimed	Mongolian People's Revolutionary Party	19,602	34.78
Ts. Sükhbaatar	Mongolian People's Revolutionary Party	15,785	28.01
Ts. Gankhuyag	Civil Will Party	14,337	25.44
G. Uyanga	Civic Coalition	9,938	17.63
P. Tüvshinzayaa	Independent	3,514	6.24
B. Tsogtgerel	New National Party	3,265	5.79
Ts. Mongol	Civic Coalition	1,492	2.65
E. Batbayar	Civic Coalition	1,462	2.59
Sh. Ganbat	Independent	848	1.50
D. Gansüren	Mongolian Traditional United Party	692	1.23
L. Chuluunbat	Republican Party	644	1.14
Ch. Ürjinbadam	Motherland Party	599	1.06
P. Altantülkhüür	Republican Party	586	1.04
B. Enkhtüvshin	Mongolian Democratic Movement Party	529	0.94
J. Chinbat	Republican Party	374	0.66
J. Dorj	Independent	326	0.58
N. Nagaanbuu	Mongolian Traditional United Party	261	0.46
T. Mandir	Mongolian Traditional United Party	184	0.33
Total		165,412	100.00
Valid votes		56,357	97.67
Invalid/blank votes		1,345	2.33
Total votes		57,702	100.00
Registered voters/turnout		74,583	77.37

Constituency 25. Bayangol
Candidate	Party	Votes	%
Ts. Mönkh-Orgil	Mongolian People's Revolutionary Party	35,095	52.73
Kh. Temüüjin	Democratic Party	33,692	50.62
D. Enkhbat	Civic Coalition	24,806	37.27
S. Erdene	Democratic Party	23,497	35.30
N. Bayartsaykhan	Mongolian People's Revolutionary Party	23,478	35.28
P. Tsogtbaatar	Mongolian People's Revolutionary Party	20,141	30.26
S. Odontyyaa	Democratic Party	19,212	28.87
N. Bolormaa	Mongolian People's Revolutionary Party	18,229	27.39
B. Batbaatar	Democratic Party	17,807	26.75
G. Gankhüü	Civil Will Party	11,769	17.68
B. Dölbadrakh	Civil Will Party	5,870	8.82
Ch. Enkhzayaa	Civic Coalition	5,522	8.30
T. Mendsaykhan	Independent	5,069	7.62
B. Batbold	Independent	2,724	4.09
N. Battsereg	New National Party	2,257	3.39
A. Otgonbold	New National Party	2,096	3.15
Ts. Enkhjin	Independent	1,617	2.43
L. Sanjaasüren	Civic Coalition	1,324	1.99
S. Amarsaykhan	Civic Coalition	1,089	1.64
B. Zorigoo	Republican Party	939	1.41
P. Ayuyrzana	Republican Party	902	1.36
N. Tsendmaa	Independent	878	1.32
Sh. Tömörsükh	Freedom Implementing Party	792	1.19
J. Erdenechimeg	Independent	516	0.78
D. Tyyaa	Independent	470	0.71
L. Jargalsaykhan	Mongolian Traditional United Party	346	0.52
M. Ganzorig	Mongolian Democratic Movement Party	289	0.43
T. Legjmaa	Republican Party	202	0.30
L. Saynbayar	Mongolian Traditional United Party	161	0.24
B. Sarantsetseg	Mongolian Traditional United Party	148	0.22
Ch. Onon	Mongolian Traditional United Party	71	0.11
Total		261,008	100.00
Valid votes		66,556	99.00
Invalid/blank votes		671	1.00
Total votes		67,227	100.00
Registered voters/turnout		87,390	76.93

Constituency 26. Songino Khairkhan
Candidate	Party	Votes	%
D. Kyokyushyuzan Batbayar	Democratic Party	54,926	58.94
D. Terbishdagva	Mongolian People's Revolutionary Party	38,525	41.34
N. Altankhuyag	Democratic Party	36,664	39.34
S. Oyuun	Civil Will Party	34,319	36.83
L. Erkhembayar	Democratic Party	32,968	35.38
B. Undarmaa	Mongolian People's Revolutionary Party	30,120	32.32
Ts. Sharavdorj	Mongolian People's Revolutionary Party	28,760	30.86
G. Enkhtayvan	Democratic Party	25,557	27.42
L. Naydan	Mongolian People's Revolutionary Party	24,291	26.07
O. Magnay	Civic Coalition	19,689	21.13
B. Jargalsaikhan	Republican Party	16,824	18.05
D. Erdenebat	Independent	4,704	5.05
D. Dari Sükhbaatar	Civic Coalition	3,247	3.48
L. Tsog	Mongolian Democratic Movement Party	2,030	2.18
B. Khosbayar	Civic Coalition	1,923	2.06
A. Ganbaatar	Civic Coalition	1,848	1.98
Kh. Enkhtuyaa	New National Party	1,798	1.93
J. Batbaatar	Republican Party	1,569	1.68
S. Regzedmaa	Republican Party	1,413	1.52
Ts. Oyuunbaatar	Independent	731	0.78
L. Altanchimeg	Mongolian Liberal Party	393	0.42
L. Khatanbaatar	Mongolian Traditional United Party	379	0.41
J. Nyam	Mongolian Traditional United Party	272	0.29
Total		362,950	100.00
Valid votes		93,190	98.61
Invalid/blank votes		1,318	1.39
Total votes		94,508	100.00
Registered voters/turnout		129,084	73.21

== Aftermath ==
=== Allegations of fraud ===
After intermediate results published on 30 June showed MPRP victory, Democratic Party (DP) chairman Tsakhiagiin Elbegdorj declared on 1 July that the elections were rigged and that his party would not accept the results. In a press conference held on 7 July, DP politicians Dambiin Dorligjav, Zandaakhuugiin Enkhbold, and Lamjavyn Gündalai declared that there had been massive irregularities with voter registration. Some of their claims were later repudiated by the central registry office. Other allegations were irregularities in the counting process, and voter bribery.

For illegally using private documents of voters such as duplicating names of voters by (publishing duplicate IDs and false IDs with the names of dead people and so on) in the 2008 election, L.Amarsanaa (MPRP), former chairman of State General Registration Authority was investigated by the Independent Authority Against Corruption and charged in September 2008.

=== Violence ===
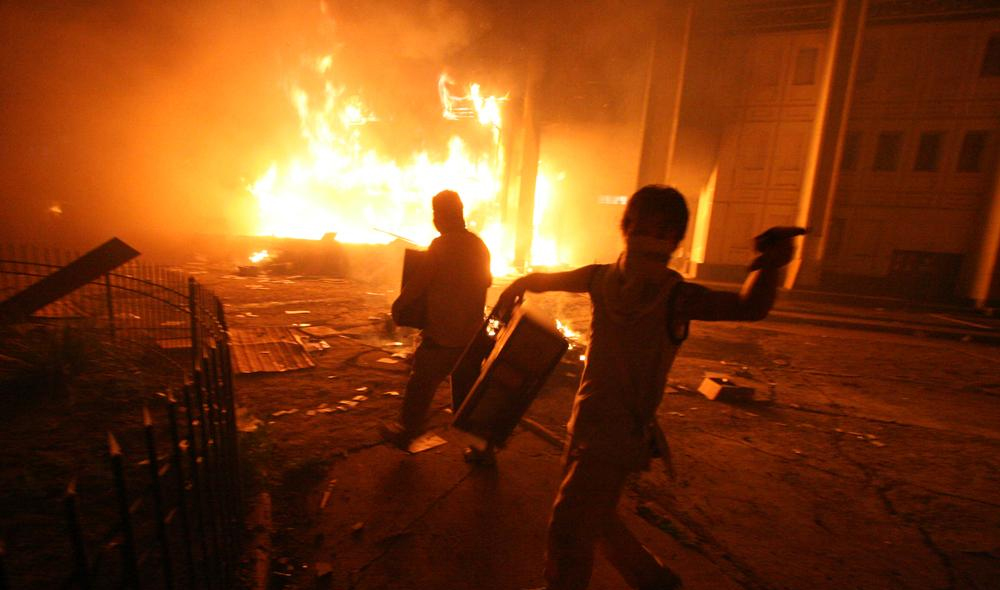
The riots in the night of July 1st

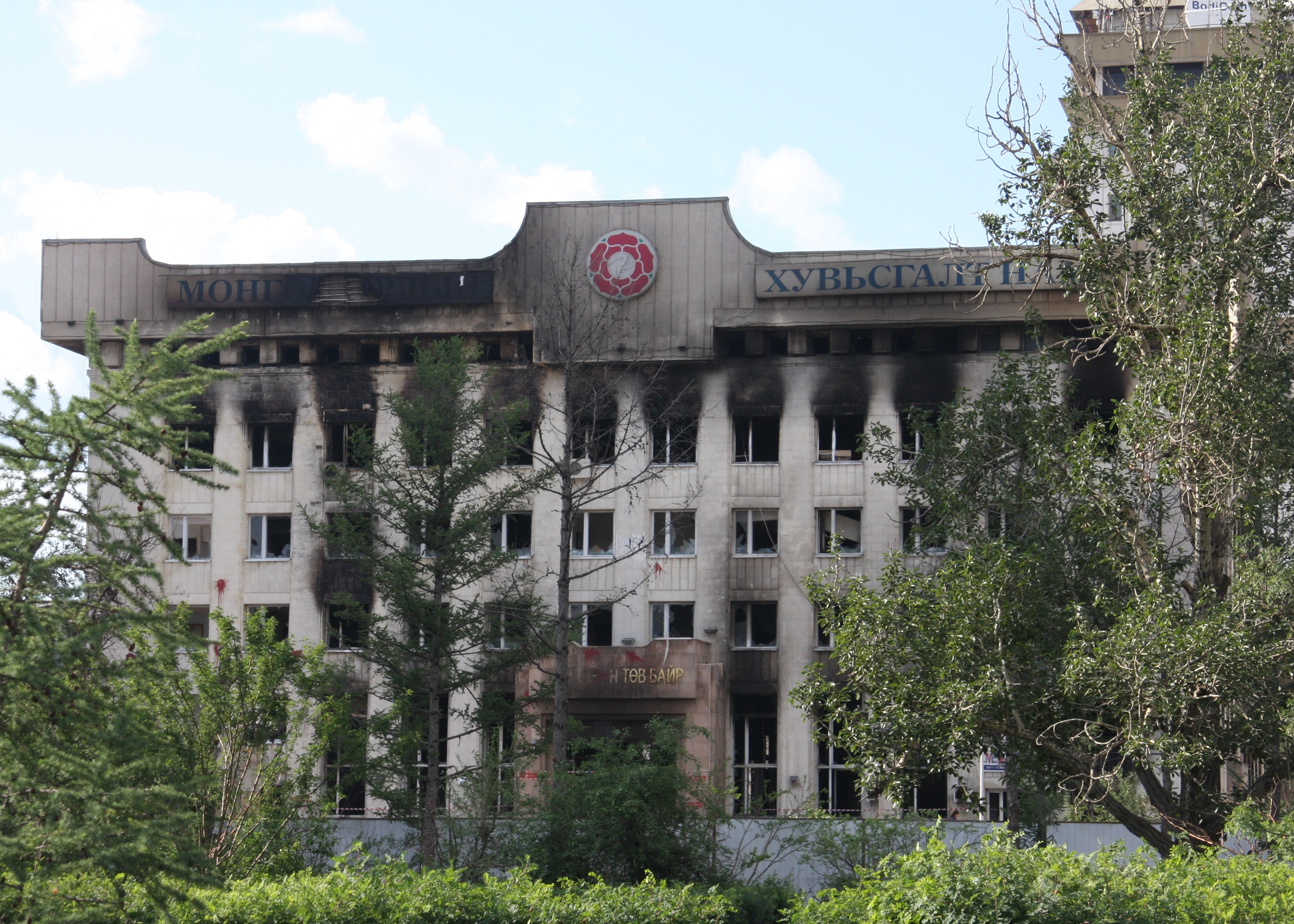
The MPRP headquarters on July 2nd after the riots

On 1 July, a peaceful gathering started at Sukhbaatar Square, organized by the opposition party leaders that took part in the elections. Eventually a large crowd gathered, mainly of young men, surrounding the adjacent MPRP Headquarters. The group started throwing rocks at the building and eventually advancing on it. Smaller police force responded with batons, water cannons, tear gas, rubber bullets, and live ammunition. In the evening fire started in the MPRP headquarters. Not enough measures to stop the riot or extinguish the fire were taken by the authority. Around midnight local time, after simply watching the live broadcast of the riot whole day on television channels, President Nambaryn Enkhbayar declared a state of emergency to be in effect for the following four days. Armored Personnel Carriers were deployed to the streets of Ulaanbaatar, a night curfew and a media blackout were declared.

Five people, all of them civilians, were killed during the state of emergency: four were shot, and one apparently died from carbon monoxide poisoning. The Mongolian Minister of Justice estimated 220 civilians and 108 service members were injured. Amnesty International raised concerns over the use of "unnecessary and excessive force" by the police.) Approximately 700 people were later arrested suspected to be being protesters, of whom 140, including 13 minors and 3 women, have been sentenced to 2–7 years in prison as of 31 October 2008.

On 15 and 19 August, ten police officers were arrested and charged in connection with the shootings in the night of 1 and 2 July. On 20 August, relatives of these arrested officers organized a protest demonstration on Sükhbaatar Square.

=== Political aftermath ===
On 18 July, DP chairman Elbegdorj announced his party's boycott of the opening session of parliament on 23 July. He also said that he was prepared to resign as DP chairman if the 200 protesters still being held by the police are not released and the political crisis did not end.

On 28 August, most of the DP representatives in the new State Great Khural decided to attend the parliament, and all but Elbegdorj were sworn in. Many of the DP lawmakers criticized the Chairman of the General Elections Commission and the way the elections were held.

On 2 September 2008, Elbegdorj resigned as the head of the Democratic Party as he said. Norovyn Altankhuyag was elected by the DP's National Consultative Committee as the next chairman, and the DP entered a coalition government with the MPRP. After Elbegdorj gave his party's position, members of the DP went out of the parliament. As a result, the new members of the parliament were not sworn in.

On 11 September, now ex-chairman Elbedorj was sworn into parliament alongside the re-appointment of incumbent prime minister and MPRP chairman Sanjiin Bayar. Bayar was re-elected as the 25th Prime Minister of Mongolia with 65 infavour and 1 against; Elbegdorj being the only one to vote against. In his second tenure, Bayar led a coalition government between the MPRP and the DP.

The members from Dornod (two MPRP, one DP) were sworn in on 16 September 2008. The members from Bayangol (2 MPRP, 1 DP, 1 Civic Coalition) were announced on 9 October 2008.

On 24 May 2009, nearly a year after the crisis, Tsakhiagiin Elbegdorj won the 2009 presidential election against incumbent President Enkhbayar.
