= Israel–Mongolia relations =

- Israel: Mongolia

Israel–Mongolia relations are the bilateral relations between Israel and Mongolia.

Israel and Mongolia established relations on 2 October 1991. Israel is represented in Mongolia via its embassy in Beijing, and Mongolia is represented in Israel via its embassy in Ankara.

== History ==
Israel and Mongolia established relations on 2 October 1991. In 1996, Israel and Mongolia agreed on Visa Exemption Agreement for Citizens Holding Diplomatic, Official and Ordinary National Passports, and Agreement on General Cooperation. In 1996, the Minister of Foreign Affairs of Mongolia Tserenpiliyn Gombosüren visited Israel, and in 1998 the Minister of National Infrastructure of Israel Ariel Sharon visited Mongolia. In 2003, Israel and Mongolia agreed on Memorandum of Understanding on the Establishment of Bilateral Consultations, and Agreement of Promotion and Reciprocal Protection of Investments. In 2003, the Minister of Foreign Affairs of Mongolia Luvsangiin Erdenechuluun visited Israel, and 2012 the Deputy of the Minister of Foreign Affairs of Israel Danny Ayalon visited Mongolia. The first state visit of the President of Mongolia, Nambaryn Enkhbayar, was made in 2008, and at same year Israel and Mongolia agreed on a Program in the Field of Culture and Science for 2008-2010.

In 2012, Israel and Mongolia agreed on an Agreement of Cooperation in the Field of Education. In 2017, the Minister of Foreign Affairs of Mongolia Tsendiin Mönkh-Orgil visited Israel. On 21 November 2017 Israel and Mongolia agreed establish a memorandum of cooperation regarding emergency protection, involving Mongolian emergency staff in the rescue training in Israel and introducing Israeli advanced technology into Mongolian emergency service. In 2018, the President of Mongolia Khaltmaagiin Battulga have sent congratulation letter to the President of Israel Reuven Rivlin on the occasion of the 70th anniversary of the establishment of Israel. On 20 May 2021, Israel's Agency for International Development Cooperation (MASHAV) donated protective equipment and face masks worth USD 20,000. On 25 May 2022, Israel and Mongolia agreed on a three-year exchange program in the fields of culture, science and sport. The agreement was signed by the Mongolian state Secretary Nyamdorj Ankhbayar and Nurit Tinari, the head of the Cultural Relations Bureau of the Israeli Foreign Ministry at the Ministry of Foreign Affairs in Jerusalem. On 25 December 2024, Israel's Agency for International Development Cooperation (MASHAV) agreed to support the Mongolian national movement “Billion Trees", to improve the green spaces, increase forest reserves, stimulate tree planting activities.

== Jewish community ==
According to the Jewish community: “there are enough fingers on two hands to count all Jews who live in Mongolia.” There is no synagogue or community center in Mongolia. The small Jewish of Mongolia is mostly expats, business related persons, and few Israelis who are married to Mongolians. The responsibility for Jewish life is managed by an Israeli-born businessman who lives in Ulaanbaatar. In 2003, the Mongol-Jewish Cooperation, was formed to facilitate a greater interest in Israel and Judaism in the country.

== See also ==
- Foreign relations of Israel
- Foreign relations of Mongolia
- History of the Jews in Mongolia
