= Batbayar =

Batbayar is a Mongolian patronym. Notable people with the name include:

- Bat-Erdeniin Batbayar, known mononymously as Baabar (born 1954), Mongolian politician
- Batjargalyn Batbayar (born 1953), Mongolian politician
- Khash-Erdene Batbayar (born 1997), Mongolian footballer
- Kyokushūzan Noboru (born 1973), Mongolian politician and former sumo wrestler
- Nyamjavyn Batbayar (born 1960), Mongolian politician
- Tsogtyn Batbayar, Mongolian politician
- Vanduin Batbayar (born 1950), Mongolian boxer
