= Road and Belt: Travel Facilitation Initiative =

The Belt and Road: Travel Facilitation Initiative is the integration of China's Belt and Road Initiative with Mongolia's initiative. It was proposed by the Minister of Foreign Affairs of Mongolia Mr. Damdin Tsogtbaatar during his official visit to the People's Republic of China at the invitation of the Foreign Minister of the People's Republic of China, Mr. Wang Yi.
