= Bazarsadyn Jargalsaikhan =

Mongolian politician and businessman

- Базарсадын Жаргалсайхан
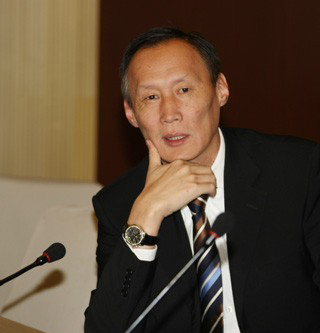
- Jargalsaikhan in 2008

Minister of Industry and Trade
- In office 5 January 2006 – 22 November 2007
- Prime Minister: Miyeegombyn Enkhbold
- Preceded by: Khalzkhuugiin Narankhuu

Member of the State Great Khural
- In office August 2004 – July 2008
- Constituency: 70th, Songinokhairkhan District, Ulaanbaatar

Chairman of the Republican Party
- Incumbent
- Assumed office 5 April 2004

Personal details
- Born: 20 August 1959 (age 67) Ulaanbaatar, Mongolia
- Party: Republican Party (since 2004)
- Other political affiliations: Republican Party (1992–2002); Civil Will–Republican Party (2002–2004)
- Education: Irkutsk State University
- Profession: Businessman, physicist

Bazarsadyn Jargalsaikhan (Mongolian: Базарсадын Жаргалсайхан; born 20 August 1959), better known by his nickname Buyangiin Jaagaa (Mongolian: Буянгийн Жагаа), is a Mongolian businessman and politician who has been the chairman of the Republican Party of Mongolia since 2004. He is the founder and owner of the Buyan Holding company.

Jargalsaikhan was elected to the State Great Khural in 2004, and served as member of parliament until 2008.

== Early life and education ==
Jargalsaikhan was born the middle child in a family of five in Ulaanbaatar on 20 August 1959. He entered the 23th Secondary School of Ulaanbaatar in 1967. After completing his secondary education in 1977, Jargalsaikhan studied as a space physicist at the Irkutsk State University of the Soviet Union. He graduated in 1988.

Between 1990 and 2004, he was regarded as one of the richest people in the country.

== Experience ==
1984-1985 Assistant worker in Govi corporation.

1985-1988 Private business

1989-1992 Founded his "Buyan" company as a small entity

1992-1996 “Buyan” became and Limited company, Executive director

1996-2004 “Buyan Holding” Co Ltd, executive director

2004-2008 Member of parliament

2006-2007 Member of cabinet, minister of trade and industry.
