= List of ambassadors of Mongolia to Russia =

This is a list of ambassadors from Mongolia to Russia and the Soviet Union:

Name	Start	End	Notes
J Davaa	1922	1924	
B Danzan	1924	1925	
G Gursed	1925	1925	
B Buyanchuluun	1925	1929	
D Gombojav	1929	1930	
D Tsienregzen	1930	1931	
G Sambuu	1931	1934	
L Darijav	1934	1936	
J Dendev	1934	1936	
Jamsrangiin Sambuu	1937	1946	(Mongolian: Жамсрангийн Самбуу; June 27, 1895 – May 21, 1972), served as the effective president of the Mongolian People's Republic from 1954 to 1972.
N Yadamjav	1946	1953	
D Adilbish	1953	1956	
S Bataa	1956	1959	
B Jambaldorj	1959	1960	
S Lubsan	1960	1964	
N Lubsanchultem	1964	1973	
H Banzragch	1973	1979	
D Gotov	1979	1984	
Ts Gurbadam	1984	1990	
N Mishigdorj	1990	1994	
N Bavuu	1994	1996	
Ts Tsolmon	1996	2000	
Sanjaagiin Bayar	2001	2005	
Luvsandandar Khangai	2005	incumbent	(Mongolian: Лувсандандарын Хангай), born 1956 in Ulaanbaatar
