= Ministry of Foreign Affairs (Mongolia) =

Government ministry of Mongolia

Ministry of Foreign Affairs of Mongolia
- Монгол Улсын Гадаад харилцааны яам
- Seal of the Ministry of Foreign Affairs of Mongolia

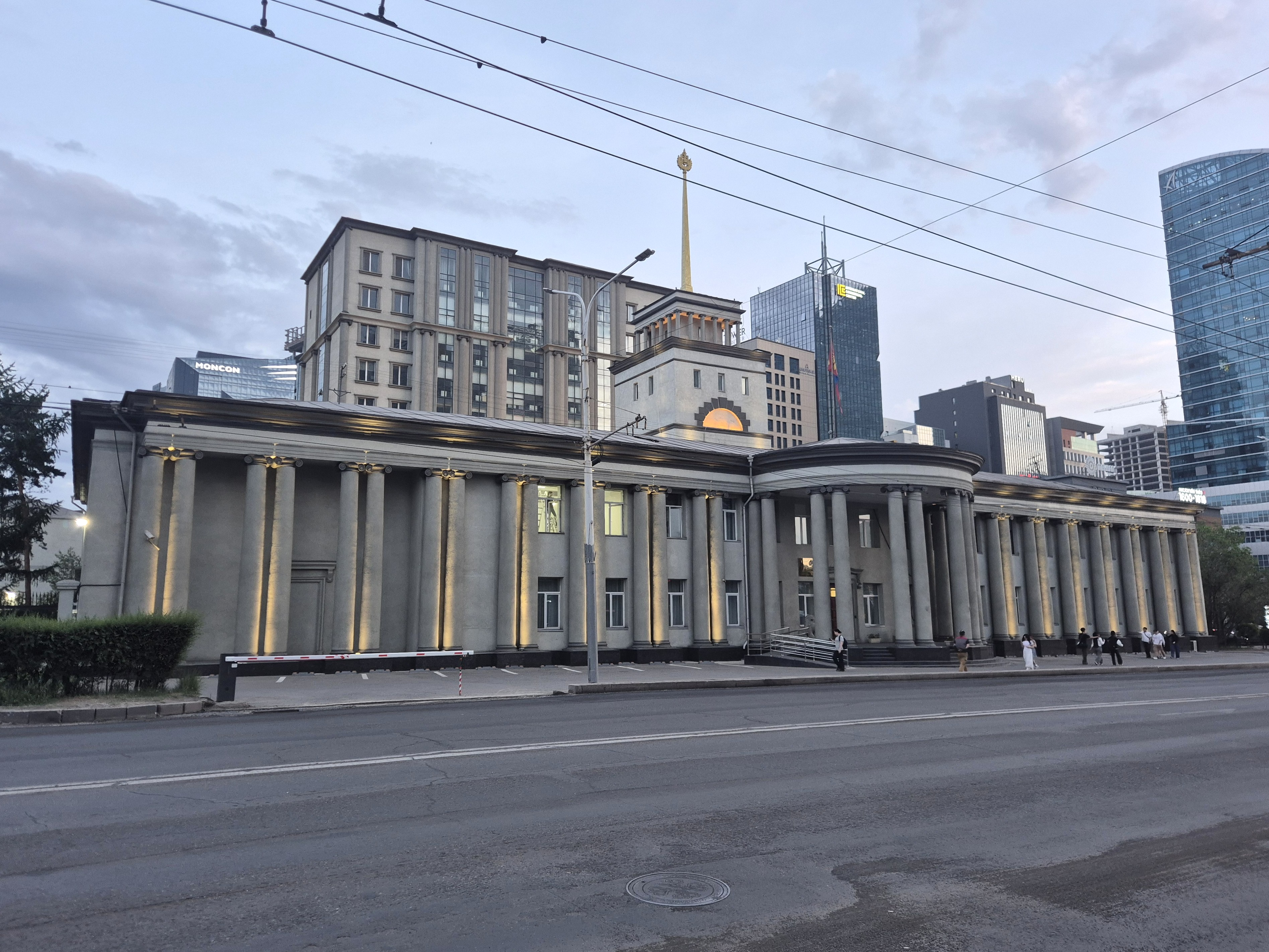

Agency overview
- Formed: December 29, 1911; 114 years ago
- Jurisdiction: Government of Mongolia
- Headquarters: Ulaanbaatar, Mongolia
- Employees: 147
- Annual budget: ₮14,100,000,000 (about US$4,900,000) (2020)
- Minister responsible: Battsetseg Batmunkh
- Website: Ministry of Foreign Affairs; Ministry of Foreign Affairs (English)

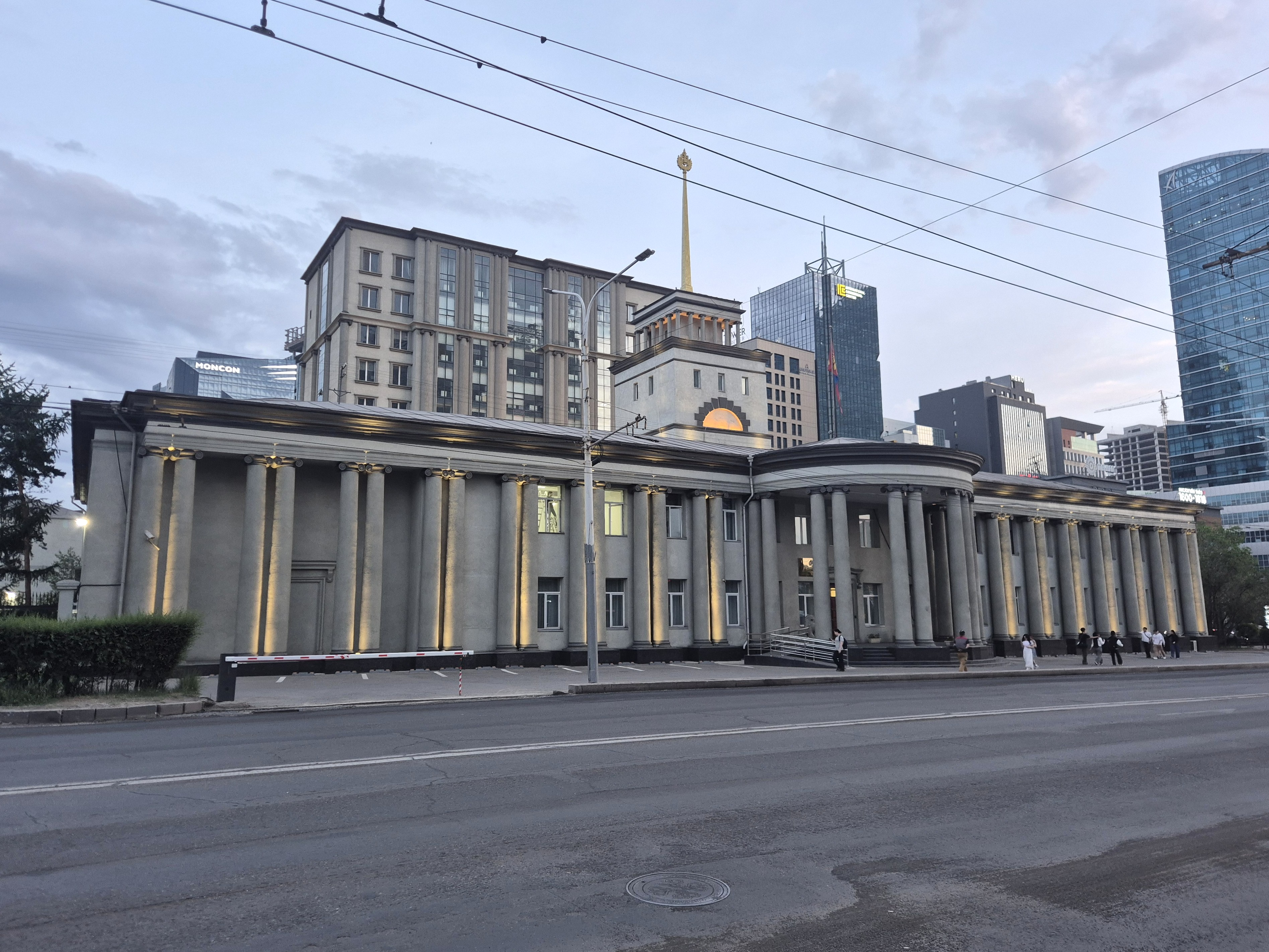
Ministry of Foreign Affairs building in Ulaanbaatar

The Ministry of Foreign Affairs of Mongolia (MOFA; Mongolian: Монгол улсын Гадаад харилцааны яам) is the Mongolian government ministry which oversees the foreign relations of Mongolia and the country's foreign policy.

== Departments ==
- Department of Policy Planning
- Department of Neighboring States
- Department of Europe
- Department of Asia and the Pacific
- Department of America, Middle East and Africa
- Department of Multilateral Cooperation
- Department of Foreign Trade and Economic Cooperation
- Department of State Administration
- Department of International Law and Treaty
- Department of Consular Affairs
- Department of Public Diplomacy and Cultural Relations
- Protocol Department
- Department of Monitoring, Evaluation and Internal Audit

== List of ministers ==
This is a list of foreign ministers of Mongolia to the present day.

- 1911–1913: Mijiddorjiin Khanddorj
- 1913–1915: Balingiin Tserendorj
- 1915–1919: Gonchigjalzangiin Badamdorj
- 1921–1922: Dogsomyn Bodoo
- 1922–1923: Balingiin Tserendorj
- 1923–1924: Anandyn Amar
- 1924–1925: Khanjiyn Givaabaljir
- 1925–1929: Vaanchingiyn Dorligjav
- 1929–1930: Ganjuuryn Gursed
- 1930–1932: Khorloogiin Choibalsan
- 1932–1936: Peljidiin Genden
- 1936–1939: Anandyn Amar
- 1939–1950: Khorloogiin Choibalsan
- 1950–1953: Nantayshiriyn Lkhamsüren
- 1953–1955: Bayaryn Jargalsaikhan
- 1955–1956: Sandavyn Ravdan (acting)
- 1956–1957: Dashiyn Adilbish
- 1957–1958: Sonomyn Avarzed
- 1958–1963: Puntsagiyn Shagdarsüren (acting to 1959)
- 1963–1968: Mangalyn Dügersüren
- 1968–1970: Luvsandorjiyn Toiv
- 1970............ Daramyn Yondon (acting)
- 1970–1976: Lodongiyn Rinchin
- 1976–1988: Mangalyn Dügersüren
- 1988–1996: Tserenpiliyn Gombosüren
- 1996............ Mendsaikhany Enkhsaikhan
- 1996–1998: Shukher Altangerel
- 1998............ Rinchinnyamyn Amarjargal
- 1998–2000: Nyam-Osoryn Tuyaa
- 2000–2004: Luvsangiin Erdenechuluun
- 2004–2006: Tsendiin Mönkh-Orgil
- 2006–2007: Nyamaagiin Enkhbold
- 2007–2008: Sanjaasürengiin Oyuun
- 2008–2009: Sükhbaataryn Batbold
- 2009–2012: Gombojavyn Zandanshatar
- 2012–2014: Luvsanvandan Bold
- 2014–2016: Lundeg Purevsuren
- 2016–2017: Tsendiin Mönkh-Orgil
- 2017–2020: Damdiny Tsogtbaatar
- 2020–2021: Nyamtseren Enkhtaivan
- 2021–present: Battsetseg Batmunkh

== See also ==
- List of diplomatic missions in Mongolia
- List of diplomatic missions of Mongolia
- Foreign relations of Mongolia
- Third neighbor policy

== Sources ==
- Official website
- Rulers.org – Foreign ministers L–R
