= Damdiny Tsogtbaatar =

Mongolian politician

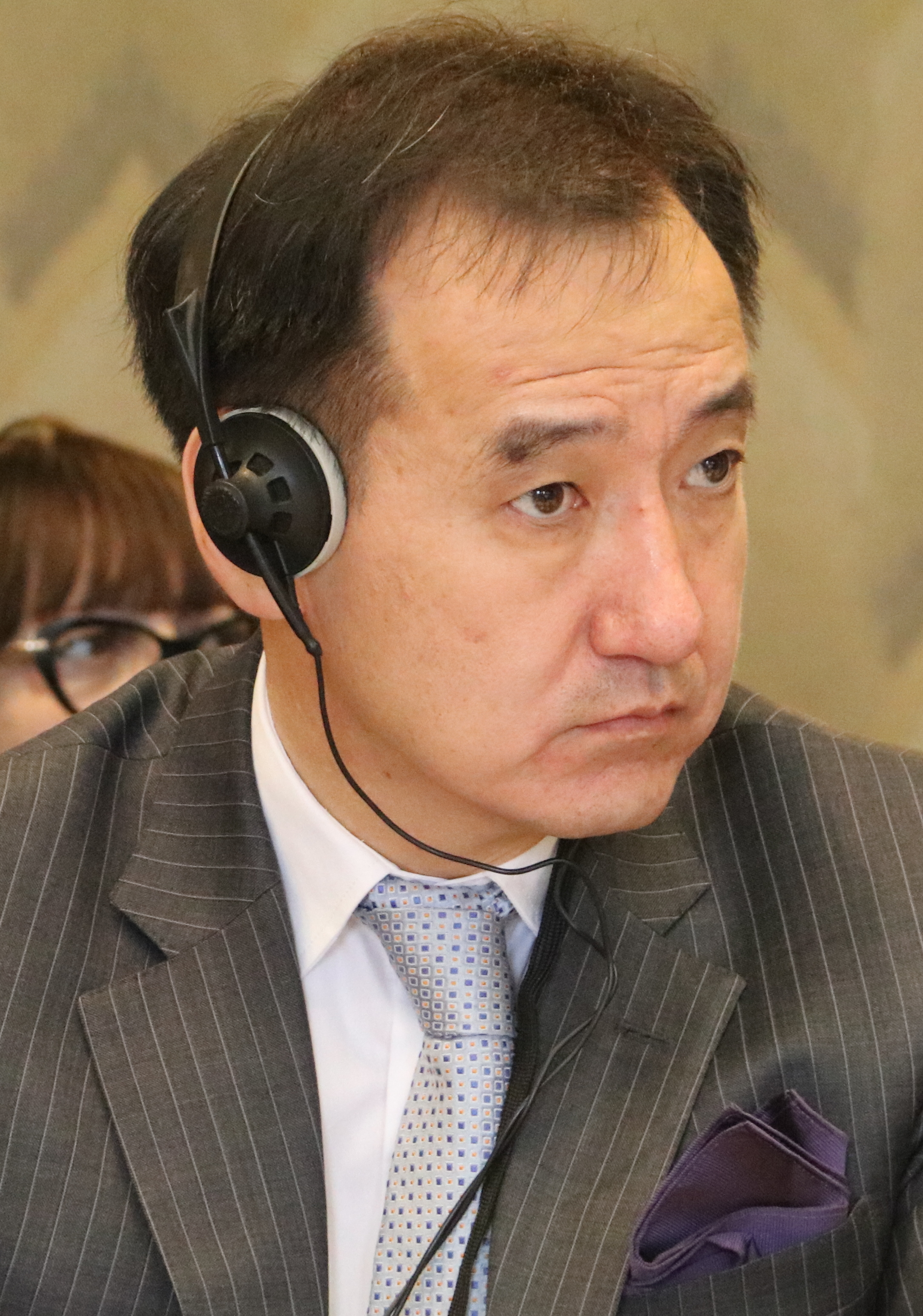

Foreign Minister of Mongolia
- In office 4 October 2017 – 7 July 2020
- Prime Minister: Jargaltulgyn Erdenebat
- Preceded by: Tsend Munkh-Orgil
- Succeeded by: Nyamtseren Enkhtaivan

Personal details
- Born: 14 January 1970 (age 56) Ulaanbaatar, Mongolian People's Republic

Damdiny Tsogtbaatar (Mongolian: Дамдины Цогтбаатар; born January 14, 1970) is a Mongolian politician and diplomat.

== Biography and career ==
He was born on January 4, 1970. In 1988 he graduated from the Soviet high school in Ulan Bator. In 1988 he entered Moscow State Institute of International Relations. In 1994–1998, he worked in the Asia and Africa Department of the Mongolian Foreign Ministry. In 1998, he received a degree from the Australian National University from the Faculty of Law and became an LLM in Legal Studies (International Law). In 1998–1999, he taught part-time at the Faculty of International Relations, Mongolian State University.

On 4 October 2017, The State Great Khural (Parliament) of Mongolia appointed him as the Foreign Minister of Mongolia. Previously he has served as State Secretary of Ministry of Foreign Affairs, Minister for Nature, Environment and Tourism of Mongolia and Minister of Construction and Urban Development of Mongolia. Since 2016 he was member of the State Great Khural (Parliament) of Mongolia. Tsogtbaatar is married and has two children.

== Personal life ==
Tsogtbaatar is married and has two children. He is fluent in English, Russian and Khmer.
