= Sanjiin Bayar =

Prime Minister of Mongolia from 2007 to 2009

- Санжийн Баяр
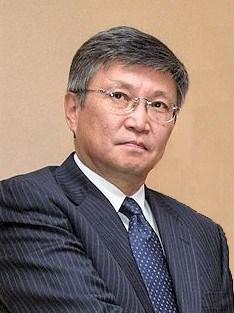
- Bayar in 2009

25th Prime Minister of Mongolia
- In office 22 November 2007 – 29 October 2009
- President: Nambaryn Enkhbayar
- Deputy: Miyeegombyn Enkhbold; Norovyn Altankhuyag
- Preceded by: Miyeegombyn Enkhbold
- Succeeded by: Sükhbaataryn Batbold

Chairman of the Mongolian People's Revolutionary Party
- In office 22 November 2007 – 8 April 2010
- Preceded by: Miyeegombyn Enkhbold
- Succeeded by: Sükhbaataryn Batbold

Member of the State Great Khural
- In office 29 July 2008 – 6 July 2012
- Constituency: 23rd, Sukhbaatar district

Member of the State Little Khural
- In office 13 September 1990 – 29 July 1992

Personal details
- Born: 24 December 1956 (age 69) Ulaanbaatar, Mongolia
- Party: Mongolian People's Party
- Spouse(s): Orsoogiin Gereltuya (Divorced); Khashbatyn Khulan (Divorced)
- Children: 3 daughters, 1 son (By Gereltuya); 1 daughter (By Khulan); 2 daughters (By Suvd)
- Education: Moscow State University (Faculty of Law)
- Profession: Lawyer, Politician, journalist and author

Military service
- Allegiance: Mongolian People's Republic
- Branch/service: Mongolian People's Army
- Years of service: 1979–1983
- Rank: Captain

Sanjiin Bayar (Mongolian: Санжийн Баяр, IPA: [sˈɑnʒyjn bˈɑj͡ar]; born 24 December 1956), sometimes referred to as Sanjaagiin Bayar, is a retired Mongolian politician who served as the 25th Prime Minister of Mongolia from 2007 to 2009. He was a member of the State Little Khural from 1990 until its dissolution in 1992, a member of the State Great Khural from 2008 to 2012, and Chairman of the Mongolian People's Revolutionary Party (now known as the MPP) from 2007 to 2010.

During his tenure as prime minister, he oversaw a coalition government dominated by the MPRP. Violent riots occurred in 2008 due to alleged electoral fraud, leading to a declaration of a state of emergency for the first time in Mongolia's modern history and a longstanding political crisis between the major political parties. Furthermore, Mongolia was hit with the 2008 financial crisis, which led to a brief economic stagnation and downturn as mineral prices collapsed.

Bayar secured a second term after the 2008 parliamentary elections, becoming the first Mongolian prime minister to secure a re-appointment. In his second administration, he established a major milestone foreign investment deal for Oyu Tolgoi mine project with Ivanhoe Mines and Rio Tinto in 2009. However, the deal was met with harsh domestic criticism and controversy. Soon enough, on 26 October 2009, Bayar resigned as prime minister for declining health. His role was assumed by his deputy, Norovyn Altankhuyag, for three days until Bayar was succeeded by Sükhbaataryn Batbold on 29 October 2009.

== Early life and education ==
Bayar was born in Ulaanbaatar, the capital of Mongolia, on 24 December 1956.

His father's given name on official government documents was Sanj, but when he entered the National University of Mongolia, an extra "aa" was mistakenly added to his name, and it became "Sanjaa" on his diploma. Due to these issues with state registration, Bayar's patronymic name has been frequently inconsistent since then.

According to Bayar's birth certificate, his official name is Sanjaagiin Ulziibayar. But when he entered a Russian kindergarten, the administration registered Bayar's full name as "Sandjaagiyn Uldziibair". His father, infuriated by Bayar's Russified name, shortened his name from "Sanjaagiin Ulziibayar" to "Sanjiin Bayar" when registering Bayar for elementary school. Many foreign media outlets and even official Mongolian government sources wrongly refer to Bayar as "Sanjaagiin Bayar", causing a misconception about his surname.

In 1978, he completed his law degree at Moscow State University. From 1979 to 1983, he worked as a junior officer at the General Staff of the Mongolian Armed Forces. Later from 1983 to 1990, Bayar worked as a journalist and editor at the state-owned Montsame and Mongolpress news agencies.

From 1992 to 1997, he taught at the Academy of Social Sciences, studied in Washington, D.C., and was director of the Mongolian Ministry of Defense's Institute for Strategic Studies. From 1997 to 2001, he was the Chief of Staff of the President's Office, and from 2001 to 2005, he was Mongolia's Ambassador to Russia.

== Political career ==
Bayar joined the Mongolian People's Revolutionary Party (MPRP) in 1988.

He was elected as a MPRP member of the State Little Khural, the standing legislature of the Mongolian People's Republic, in September 1990. He served as a lawmaker until the legislature's dissolution in 1992

He became General Secretary of the MPRP in 2005 and was – by 377 to 229 votes – elected Chairman of the MPRP at a party congress in October 2007, defeating incumbent Miyeegombyn Enkhbold. The same congress also voted in favor of Bayar becoming the next prime minister. The State Great Khural (unicameral parliament) approved Bayar as the 25th Prime Minister of Mongolia on 22 November 2007, with 67 votes in favor (97.1%) and two against.

== Prime Minister of Mongolia (2007–2009) ==
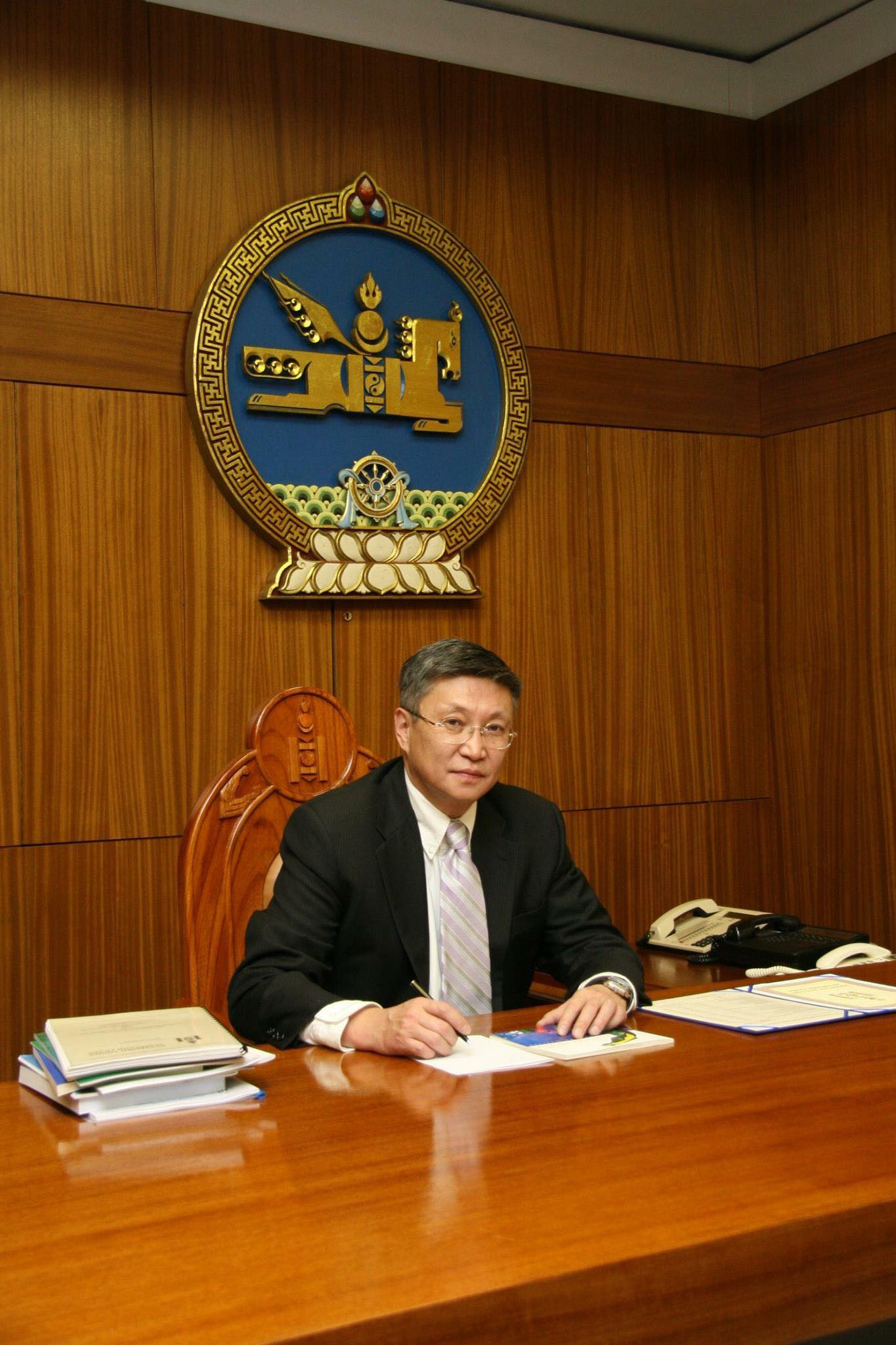
Bayar in his office as prime minister, 2008

He began his career as prime minister with verbal attacks (speech at his appointment) against Tsakhiagiin Elbegdorj and the nationalisation of the 15% share of Mongolian companies in the Tavantolgoi mine, making it a 100% public venture, thus inducing enthusiasm of Russian companies in the large coal deposit. Most of the members of a three-party coalition government, led by Bayar and dominated by the MPRP, were approved by the State Great Khural on 5 December 2007; the government included Bayar's predecessor, Miyeegombyn Enkhbold, as Deputy Prime Minister. This government was planned to serve until the June 2008 parliamentary election.

=== 2008 state of emergency ===
On 1 July 2008, peaceful protests against election fraud turned into a riot, the first-ever to happen in Mongolia. During the riots, the police chased civilians and shot four civilians to death from their backs and severely injured a dozen of civilians in streets different from demonstration or riot location. Nambaryn Enkhbayar, then-President of Mongolia, announced the country's first state of emergency in the midnight after the riot calmed. Subsequently, the police arrested approximately 1000 people in street or from random locations and imprisoned them. The arrests included children and women without legal advocacy. It is alleged that the police used inhumane methods on the arrested individuals. Victims, and their families, and civil societies claim the responsibility to President Enkhbayar who announced the state of emergency in the middle of night – an uncustomary hour of announcing state of emergency. A wounded teenager to lifelong disability and witnesses confirmed that they were shot by the police.

The National Police Agency is the state enforcement agency of the government, thus President Nambaryn Enkhbayar, Prime Minister Sanjiin Bayar and Minister of Justice Tsendiin Mönkh-Orgil have been blamed by the victims, their families, and civil societies for the deaths.

=== Re-appointment ===
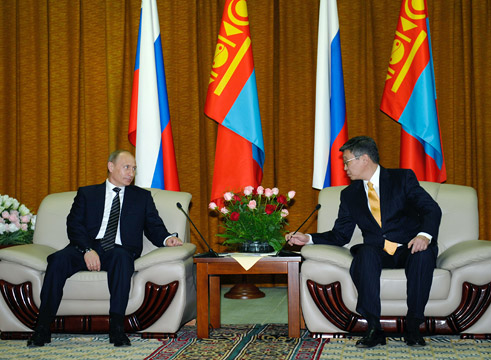
Bayar with Russian premier Vladimir Putin in March 2009

On 11 September 2008, following the MPRP's victory in the June election, Bayar was re-elected as prime minister with 65 infavour and 1 against during a parliamentary vote. In his second term, he led a coalition government between the MPRP and opposition Democratic Party. Under his leadership, the Government of Mongolia finally signed an investment agreement to mine the Oyu Tolgoi copper deposit in 2009. The deal was later revealed that in fact it was in favor of the investors. According to some sources, after his resignation he moved to the US and bought several properties on his daughter and relatives names. Later it was found that he has several offshore accounts. It is believed that he still had influences in the MPP which is confirmed by a leaked video footage in which he gives advice to Miyeegombyn Enkhbold, the official head of the party, for his 2017 presidential election speech preparation.

=== Declining health and resignation ===
Bayar was admitted to a hospital in Ulaanbaatar in October 2009. Because of his declining health, Bayar announced his resignation in a letter to the State Great Khural one week later on 26 October 2009. A meeting held two days later confirmed that the parliament had accepted his resignation, in which Bayar apologised to those who had voted for him. Norovyn Altankhuyag, the First Deputy Prime Minister, temporarily moved up as Bayar's replacement. Bayar then was succeeded by Sükhbaataryn Batbold on 29 October 2009.

On 8 April 2010, Sanjiin Bayar read his written request to resign from the chairmanship of the Mongolian People's Revolutionary Party due to declining health reasons to the conference of the party and then was replaced by incumbent premier Sükhbaataryn Batbold for the position on the same day from the party conference.

== Arrest ==
On 11 April 2018, Bayar and Chimediin Saikhanbileg, another former prime minister of Mongolia, were arrested by the anti-graft agency, the Independent Authority Against Corruption.

== Personal life ==
He is twice divorced and has seven children.

Party political offices
Preceded by Miyeegombyn Enkhbold	General Secretary of the Central Committee of the Mongolian People's Party; 2007–2010	Succeeded by Sükhbaataryn Batbold
Political offices
Preceded by Miyeegombyn Enkhbold	Prime Minister of Mongolia; 2007–2009	Succeeded by Sükhbaataryn Batbold
