= Lamjavyn Gündalai =

Mongolian politician

- Ламжавын Гүндалай
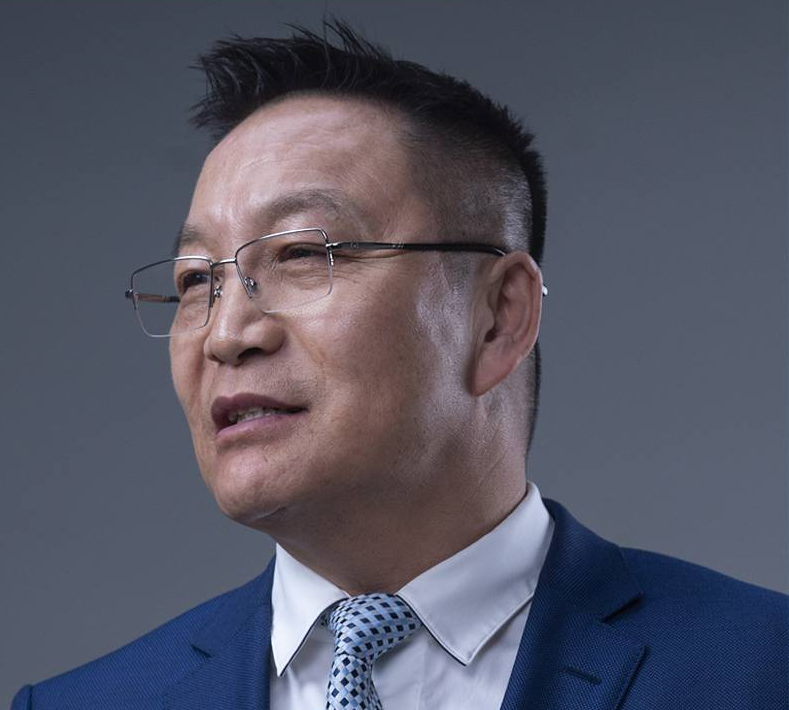
- Gündalai in 2024

Minister of Health
- In office 25 January 2006 – January 2007
- Prime Minister: Miyeegombyn Enkhbold
- Preceded by: Tugsjargalyn Gandi
- Succeeded by: Danzandarjaagiin Tuya

Member of the State Great Khural
- In office July 2000 – July 2012
- Constituency: 17th, Khövsgöl Province (2008–2012); 45th, Khövsgöl Province (2000–2008)

Personal details
- Born: 12 November 1963 (age 62) Khatgal, Khövsgöl, Mongolia
- Party: People's Power Party
- Other political affiliations: Democratic Party (2000–2005; 2008–2015); People's Party (2005–2008); Independent (2000)
- Spouse(s): Tsatsaa (Divorced); Lamjavyn Azzaya
- Children: 1 daughter, 1 son (By Tsatsaa); 3 daughters (By Azzaya)
- Education: Martin Luther University Halle-Wittenberg
- Awards: Order of the Polar Star
- Website: Official website

Lamjavyn Gündalai (Mongolian: Ламжавын Гүндалай; born 12 November 1963) is a Mongolian politician. He was thrice elected as a member of the State Great Khural in 2000, 2004 and 2008 from his native Khövsgöl Province. Gündalai served as Minister of Health from January 2006 to January 2007.

== Early life and education ==
Gündalai was born as the eighth child in Khatgal, Khövsgöl Province, on 12 November 1963. He graduated as a top student from his local secondary school and from his province in 1982. He studied medicine at the Martin Luther University of Halle-Wittenberg in Germany from 1984 to 1991. Gündalai would later become the founder of the GMET LLC and Batsarai companies. He returned to Mongolia in 1996.

== Political career ==
=== Member of parliament (2000–2012) ===
In the 2000 parliamentary election, he won his parliamentary seat from the 45th constituency in Khövsgöl as an independent candidate. The ex-communist Mongolian People's Revolutionary Party won 72 seats in parliament, whilst the main opposition Democratic Union won only one. In December of that same year, the remnants of the opposition Democratic Union merged into the Democratic Party (DP). He subsequently joined the Democratic Party and served as deputy party chairman of the DP from 2001 to 2004. He was one of the four opposition lawmakers to the MPRP. During his first term, Gundalai was involved in a highly publicized dispute with the then-Minister of Justice, Tsendiin Nyamdorj. The conflict escalated when the Ministry accused Gundalai of leaking state secrets, an allegation Gundalai denied. On July 24, 2003, plainclothes police arrested Gundalai at Ulaanbaatar's airport while he was en route to a democracy conference in Singapore (via Seoul). The arrest, which was conducted without the lifting of his parliamentary immunity, involved physical confrontations with his security detail and sparked immediate protests from human rights groups and the Democratic Party. He was detained at the Gants Khudag detention center but was released the following day without charge.

Gündalai was re-elected from his home provice, Khövsgöl, in the 2004 parliamentary election. The Motherland Democratic Coalition (MDC), led by the DP, won 35 out of 76 seats, whilst the rival MPRP won 37. A hung parliament was convened, and a coalition government was formed between the MDC and the MPRP. In late 2005, after disagreements with the Democratic chairman and prime minister Tsakhiagiin Elbegdorj, Gündalai founded his own party, the People's Party (Mongolian: Ард Түмний Нам), with a party structure, allegedly modeled after the political structure of the Great Mongol Empire. Four other DP lawmakers split off and founded the MPRP-friendly New National Party. With a now favorable majority in forming a government, the MPRP left the Elbegdorj cabinet and formed a new coalition government with MPRP chairman Miyeegombyn Enkhbold as head on 25 January 2006.

Prior to the 2008 parliamentary election, Gündalai left the People's Party and rejoined the DP. He was again elected as MP from the 17th Khövsgöl constituency, and was one of the two Democratic MPs to be elected from Khövsgöl on 29 June 2008.

In October 2011, during a state visit by German Chancellor Angela Merkel, Gündalai greeted Merkel in the Government Palace and cheek-kissed her.

After disagreements with the DP leader, Gündalai broke off for a second time and founded the "Love the People Party" (Mongolian: Ард Түмнээ Хайрлая Нам) in 2015. His party was officially registered by the Supreme Court of Mongolia on 26 June 2015. In November 2023, the party changed its name to the People's Power Party (Mongolian: Ард Түмний Хүч Нам). He failed to be elected as a member of parliament in 2016, 2020, and 2024, by only a few hundred votes.

== Personal life ==
Gündalai is married to Lamjavyn Azzaya and has three daughters. He was previously married to Tsatsaa and had a daughter and a son, who studied in the United Kingdom.

He is able to speak in English and in German. As of October 2025, Gündalai is considered to be the most-followed Mongolian politician on social media. He currently has around 910,000 followers on Facebook.
