= Nyamaagiin Enkhbold =

Mongolian politician

- Нямаагийн Энхболд
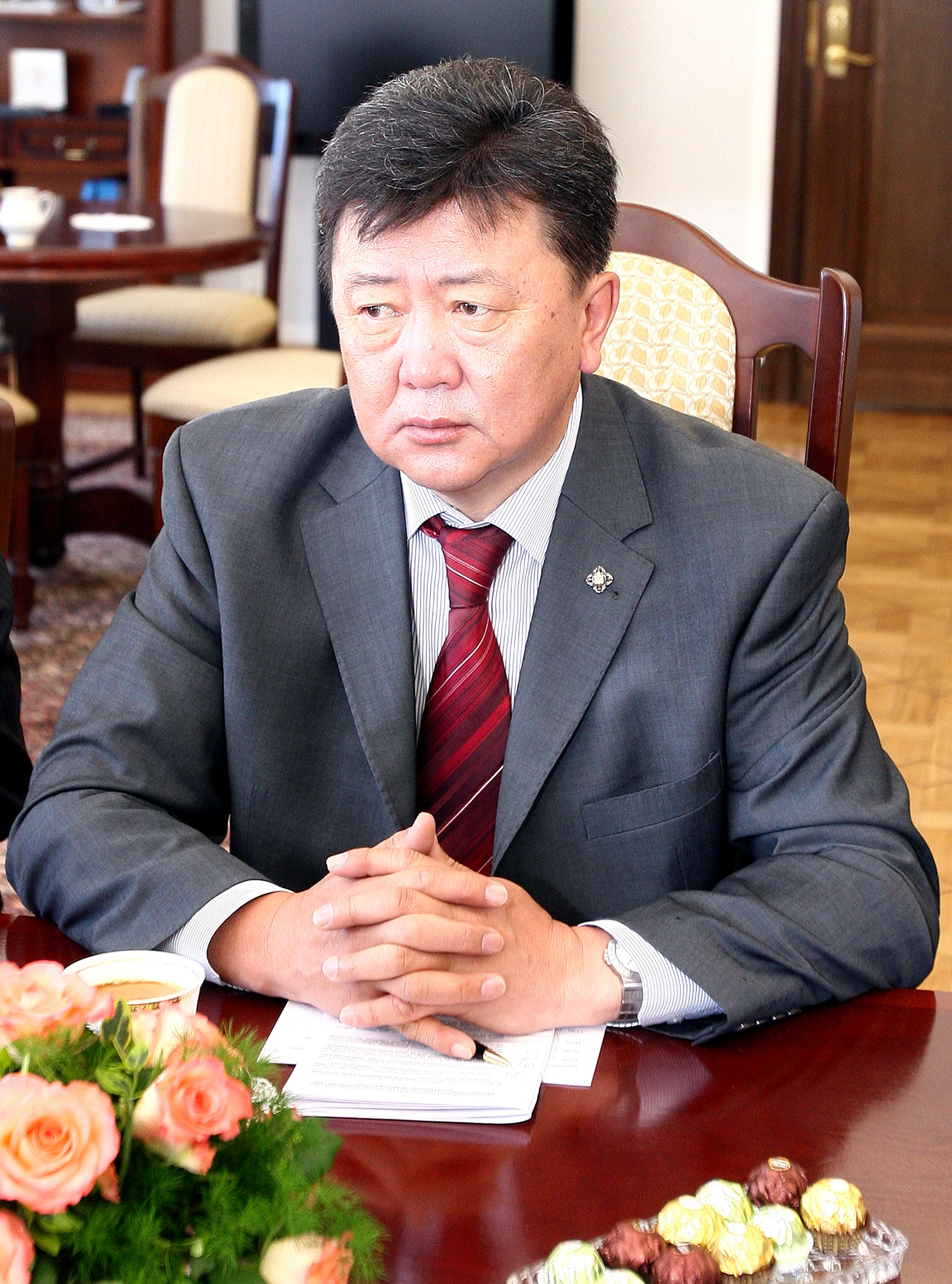

Minister of Defense of Mongolia
- In office October 19, 2017 – 8 July 2020
- President: Khaltmaagiin Battulga
- Preceded by: Badmaanyambuugiin Bat-Erdene
- Succeeded by: Gürsediin Saikhanbayar

Foreign Minister of Mongolia
- In office 2006–2007
- President: Nambaryn Enkhbayar
- Preceded by: Tsend Munkh-Orgil
- Succeeded by: Sanjaasürengiyn Oyun

Personal details
- Born: 6 January 1957 (age 68); Uliastai, Zavkhan aimag, Mongolia
- Political party: Mongolian People's Party
- Profession: Economist, Politician

Nyamaagiin Enkhbold (Mongolian: Нямаагийн Энхболд; born 6 January 1957) is a Mongolian politician who is a member of parliament and the president of Mongolian Red Cross Society since 2010. He was the Foreign Minister of Mongolia from 2006 to 2007 and was Defense Minister of Mongolia from October 2017 to July 2020. He was elected continuously 4 times as a Member of the State Great Khural representing the Töv Province.

== Early life ==
He was born in early 1957 in Uliastai. He finished high school in 1974 and started studying in Moscow Higher School of Publishing. He earned an undergraduate diploma in 1979 majoring in economics. From 1979 to 1980, he worked as an economist at the Ministry of Culture. From 1980 to 1986, Enkhbold worked as a senior specialist at the Planning Department of Ministry of Culture. In 1986, he became a deputy director at the States Printing House. Three years later, he got promoted as a Director of "Mongol Khevlel" State corporation. In 1990, he studied political science at Political Institute of Moscow. From 1993 to 1995, Enkhbold worked as an Advisor to the Deputy Prime Minister of Mongolia. From 1997 to 2000, he worked as a Head of the Media and Public relations Department at the Office of the President of Mongolia. In 1997, he earned graduate diploma in public policy at the University of Sydney, Australia.

== Political career ==
Since 2000, Enkhbold has been elected five times as a member of the State Great Khural) representing Töv Province. From 2006 to 2007, he served as a Foreign Minister of Mongolia, during presidency of Nambaryn Enkhbayar. The following year, he became the Chief of the Cabinet Secretariat. From 2008 to 2012, Enkhbold worked as a Vice Speaker of State Great Khural. From 2012 to 2013, he worked as a Head of the Mongolian People's Party Group at the Parliament. In 2010, Enkhbold became the President of Mongolian Red Cross Society.

== Gallery ==
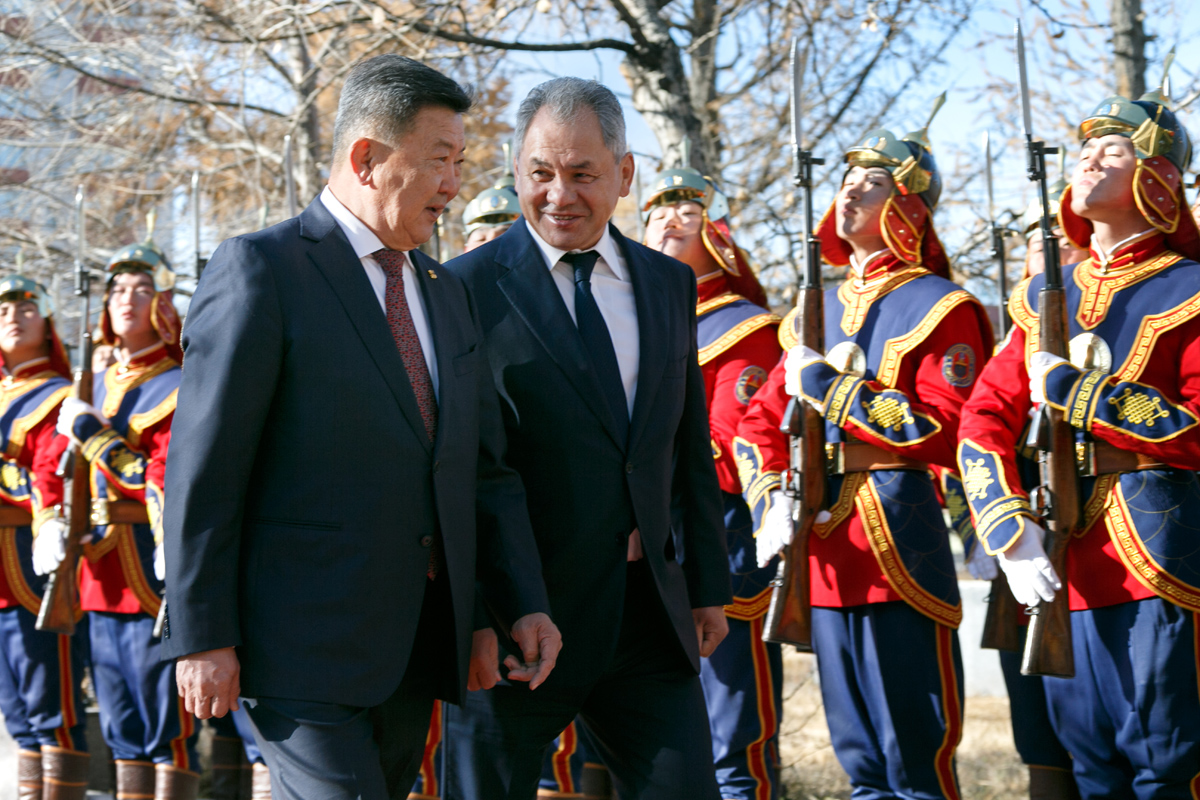
Enkhbold with Sergey Shoigu in October 2018.

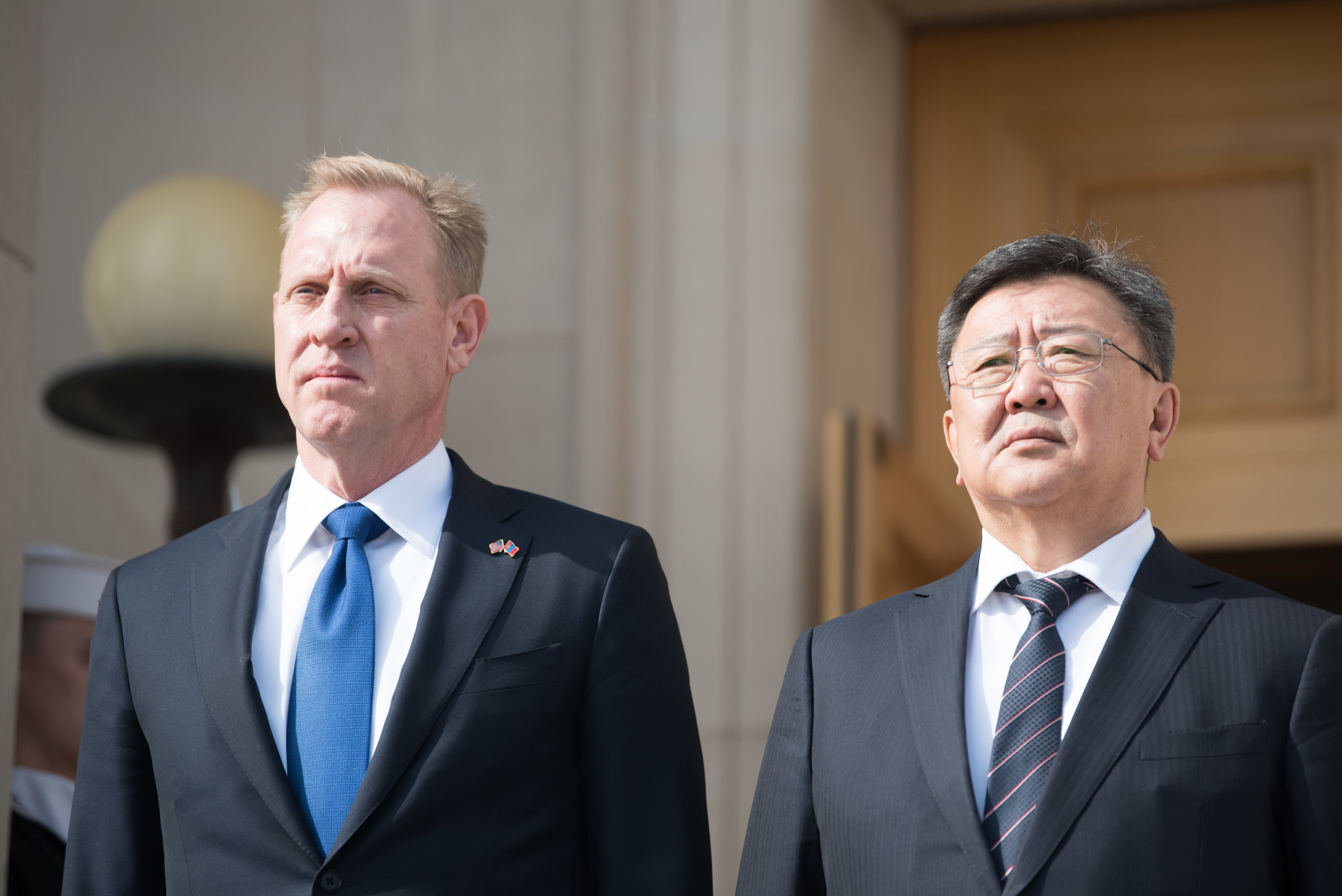
Enkhbold with Patrick Shanahan at The Pentagon in April 2019.

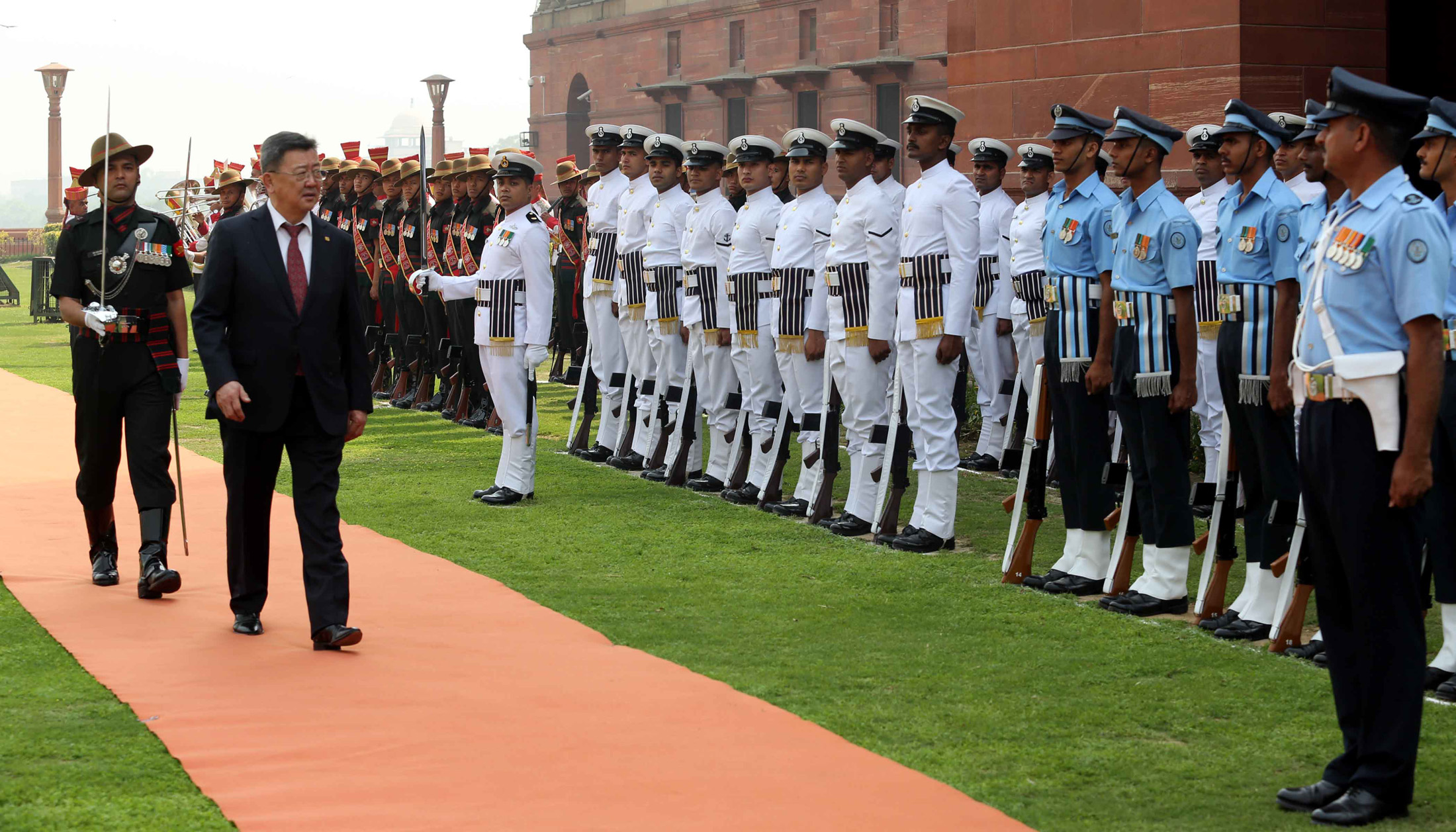
Enkhbold inspecting the Tri-Services Guard of Honour in New Delhi, March 2018.
