= Batjargalyn Batbayar =

Mongolian politician

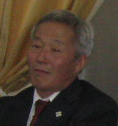

Batjargalyn Batbayar (Mongolian: Батжаргалын Батбаяр; born December 3, 1953, in Kharkhorin, Övörkhangai) is a democratic member of the State Great Hural of Mongolia.

== Education ==
In 1980 he graduated from Krivoi Rog Higher School of Mining in Ukraine. He studied at the Foreign Trade Management Center of the World Trade Institute in New York City in 1993.

== Non-political career ==
- Machinist at the Power Plant III (1971–1974)
- Electrical Technician at the Community Service Trust (1980–1981)
- Engineer at the Community Service Trust (1981–1985)
- Engineer at the Dry-Cleaning State-Owned Enterprise (1985–1989)
- Chairman of the Bolor Dry-Cleaning Cooperative (1989–1996)

== Political career ==
- Member of the State Great Hural (1996–2000)
- Chairman of the Standing Committee on Environmental Protection of the State Great Hural (1999–2000)
- Member of the board of directors of the North East Asian Society (Mongolia) (2000–2004)
- Member of the State Great Hural (2004–2008), elected in Chingeltei düüreg
- Elected to the State Great Hural in the 2008 Parliamentary Election, for Bayankhongor.
