= Luvsangiin Erdenechuluun =

Mongolian politician

Luvsangiin Erdenechuluun (Mongolian: Лувсангийн Эрдэнэчулуун; born October 10, 1948, in Ulaanbaatar, Mongolia) was the foreign minister of Mongolia from August 2000 until September 2004, when the Mongolian parliament approved a coalition government following the 2004 parliamentary elections and he was succeeded by Tsendiin Mönkh-Orgil. He is a member of the Mongolian People's Party.

In 2005 he founded the Human Security Research Center, an NGO that investigated human trafficking. In 2008 he became Representative of Mongolia to the executive board of UNESCO with the rank of ambassador.

His father was Sonomyn Luvsan, a leading communist political figure and diplomat from the 1940s to the 1970s who served as acting head of state of Mongolia from June 29, 1972, to June 11, 1974.
