= Tsendiin Mönkh-Orgil =

Mongolian politician

- Цэндийн Мөнх-Оргил
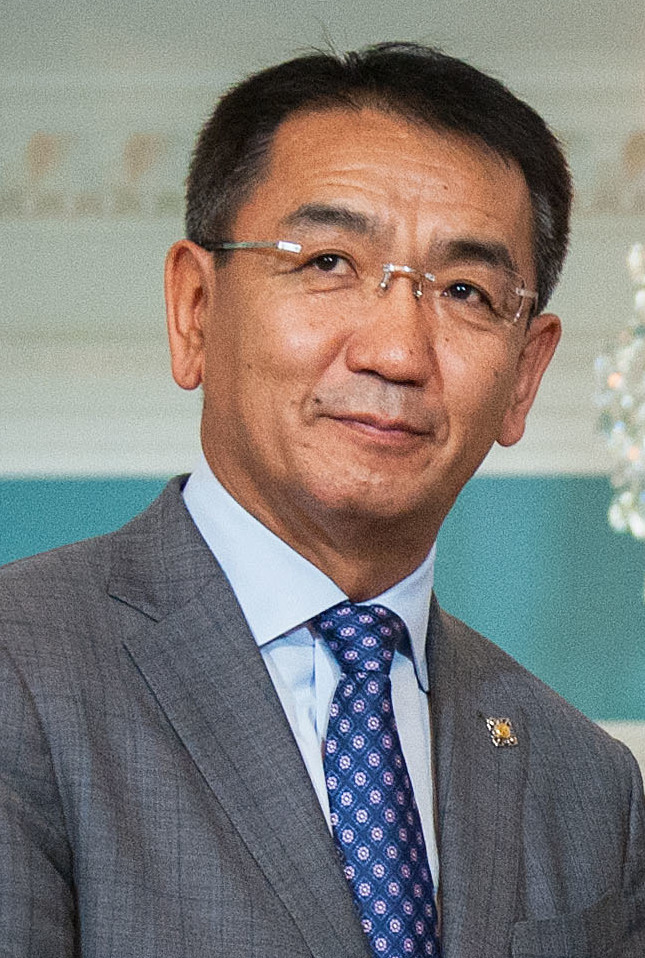

Foreign Minister of Mongolia
- In office 22 July 2016 – 4 October 2017
- Prime Minister: Jargaltulgyn Erdenebat
- Preceded by: Lundeg Purevsuren
- Succeeded by: Damdin Tsogtbaatar
- In office 28 September 2004 – 28 January 2006
- Preceded by: Luvsangiin Erdenechuluun
- Succeeded by: Nyamaagiin Enkhbold

Minister of Justice and Internal Affairs
- In office 2007–2008
- Prime Minister: Sanjaagiin Bayar

Deputy Minister of Justice and Internal Affairs
- In office 2000–2004

Member of the State Great Khural
- In office 2020–present
- Constituency: Ulaanbaatar, Sükhbaatar district
- In office 2016–2020
- Constituency: Ulaanbaatar, Sükhbaatar district
- In office 2008–2012
- Constituency: Ulaanbaatar, Bayangol district
- In office 2004–2008
- Constituency: Ulaanbaatar, Sükhbaatar district

Personal details
- Born: 18 October 1964 (age 61) Baruun-Urt, Sukhbaatar Province, Mongolian People's Republic
- Party: Mongolian People's Party
- Education: Moscow State Institute of International Relations (LL.B.), Harvard Law School (LL.M.)

Military service
- Allegiance: Mongolian People's Republic
- Branch/service: Mongolian People's Army
- Years of service: 1982–1983

Tsend Mönkh-Orgil or Tsendiin Mönkh-Orgil (Mongolian: Цэндийн Мөнх-Оргил; born 18 October 1964) is a Mongolian politician and a member of the State Great Hural. He is also the first person from Mongolia to join the United Nations International Law Commission as a member.

Mönkh-Orgil previously served as the Foreign Minister of Mongolia from 2004 to 2006 and from 2016 to 2017. Additionally, he served as the Minister of Justice and Internal Affairs from 2007 to 2008.

== Early life and education ==
Mönkh-Orgil was born to a family of doctors in the town of Baruun-Urt, Sukhbaatar Province, on 18 October 1964. As his parents' work commission ended in 1968, they moved to Ulaanbaatar, where he completed his secondary education at the 23rd school. As a kid, Mönkh-Orgil dreamed of becoming a pilot, architect, and journalist. At the end of his 10th grade, as he started to actively read Ünen, a Mongolian daily newspaper, as well as Russian newspapers, he developed an interest in international relations, and decided to pursue a higher education in the field.

He received a bachelor's degree from the Faculty of International Law at the Moscow State Institute of International Relations in 1988, and earned a master's degree from Harvard Law School in 1996. He engaged in postgraduate studies at the John F. Kennedy School of Government in 2001.

In 1982, the year before he went to study in Moscow, Mönkh-Orgil was drafted into the army and served in the 282nd Unit of the Mongolian People's Army.

== Diplomatic career ==
Mönkh-Orgil joined the Foreign Ministry of Mongolia in 1988 and worked there as a Diplomatic Officer until 1991. He was also a Diplomatic Officer at the Permanent Mission of Mongolia to the United Nations in New York from 1991 to 1995.

Throughout his diplomatic career, Mönkh-Orgil acted as the head or member of the Mongolian delegations to numerous international conferences including the UN General Assembly, the Conference on Disarmament, and the Human Rights Council.

In November 2021, Mönkh-Orgil was elected as a member of the United Nations International Law Commission at the 76th session of the UN General Assembly.

== Political career ==
Mönkh-Orgil started his political career in 2000, when he joined the Mongolian People's Party (MPP) as a member of its Governing Conference. He acted as a member of the party's Governing Council (executive body) from 2004-2008, 2012-2014, and has been a member since 2021. He was also secretary of the MPP in charge of the capital city of Ulaanbaatar from 2012 to 2014.

Furthermore, Mönkh-Orgil was elected as a member of the State Great Khural a total of 4 times, in 2004, 2008, 2016, and 2020. As a member of the parliament, he has drafted and co-drafted many pieces of legislation including civil, criminal, customs, corporate, labor, and land codes, and laws related to elections, political parties, anti-corruption, and anti-money laundering.

In 2000 and 2007, Mönkh-Orgil was appointed as the Deputy Minister and the Minister for Justice and Internal Affairs of Mongolia respectively.

In 2004 and 2016, Mönkh-Orgil was appointed as the Foreign Minister of Mongolia. As the foreign minister, he focused on improving foreign trade and economic relations, easing trade process, and providing comfortable legal environment for foreign investors and business owners. Also, he made statements about the need to consolidate Mongolia's budget.

During the merger process of the MPP and the Mongolian People's Revolutionary Party, which took place from 2020 to 2021, Mönkh-Orgil was a member of the team responsible for negotiating and managing the process.

Mönkh-Orgil is currently the Chairman of the Mongolian People's Party Working Group on Human Resources Development and Management Policy Paper.

== Legal career ==
From 1996 to 2000, Mönkh-Orgil acted as an attorney-at-law in private law firms in the Washington, D.C. and Ulaanbaatar, Mongolia. He also acted as a counsel and advisor to the Government of Mongolia in numerous litigations in domestic and international courts, as well as arbitrations and foreign investment negotiations. His expertise on law and legal matters helped him win court cases on behalf of the Mongolian Government, such as the "Marubeni Case".

== Personal life ==
Mönkh-Orgil is married and has three children. He has been a member of the New York State Bar Association since 1996. He joined the Mongolian National Olympic Committee as a member in 2017.

In 2017, Mönkh-Orgil was awarded the diplomatic title of Ambassador Extraordinary and Plenipotentiary by the Decree of the President of Mongolia.

In addition to his native Mongolian, Mönkh-Orgil is fluent in English, Russian, and French.

== See also ==
- List of foreign ministers in 2017
