= Nyamjavyn Batbayar =

Mongolian politician (born 1960)

Nyamjavyn Batbayar (Mongolian: Нямжавын Батбаяр, born in Ulaanbaatar on April 1, 1960) is a Mongolian politician who has served in the State Great Khural since 2008. A member of the Democratic Party, he represents the Arkhangai constituency. Batbayar received both his bachelor's and master's degree from Moscow State University.
