= Tsogtyn Batbayar =

Mongolian politician

Tsogtyn Batbayar (Mongolian: Цогтын Батбаяр) was mayor of Ulaanbaatar, the capital city of Mongolia, from 2005 to December 2007. His successor was Tüdeviin Bilegt.

Batbayar is a member of the predominantly ex-communist Mongolian People's Revolutionary Party, or MPRP. The city council of Ulaanbaatar selected Batbayar as mayor in 2005.

Batbayar visited the United States, including the United Nations, in October 2006.
