= Sükhbaataryn Batbold =

Prime Minister of Mongolia from 2009 to 2012

- Сүхбаатарын Батболд
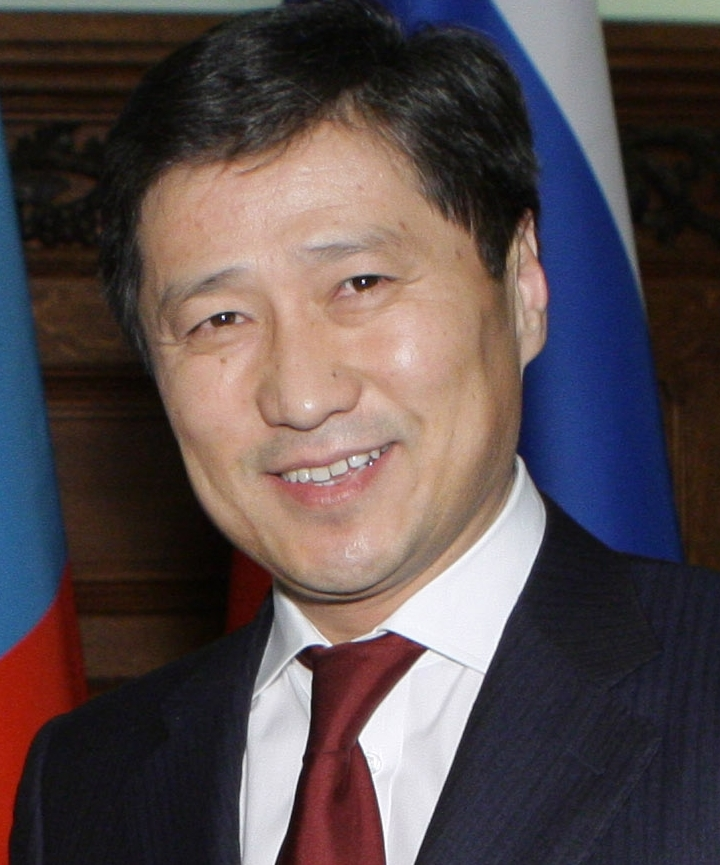
- Batbold in 2010

26th Prime Minister of Mongolia
- In office 29 October 2009 – 10 August 2012
- President: Tsakhiagiin Elbegdorj
- Deputy: Norovyn Altankhuyag
- Preceded by: Sanjaagiin Bayar
- Succeeded by: Norovyn Altankhuyag

Chairman of the Mongolian People’s Party
- In office 8 April 2010 – 25 July 2012
- Preceded by: Sanjaagiin Bayar
- Succeeded by: Ölziisaikhany Enkhtüvshin

Minister of Foreign Affairs of Mongolia
- In office 2008–2009
- Preceded by: Sanjaasürengiyn Oyun
- Succeeded by: Gombojavyn Zandanshatar

Personal details
- Born: June 24, 1963 (age 63) Choibalsan, Mongolian People's Republic
- Party: Mongolian People's Party
- Education: Moscow State Institute of International Relations; Middlesex University London Business School; Diplomatic Academy of the Ministry of Foreign Affairs of Russia
- Website: Official website

Sükhbaataryn Batbold (Mongolian: Сүхбаатарын Батболд, born June 24, 1963) is a prominent Mongolian political figure and leader, who was the 26th Prime Minister of Mongolia from 2009 to 2012, as well as Chairman of the Mongolian People's Party. He was previously Minister of Foreign Affairs in the government of his predecessor, Sanjaagiin Bayar.

== Personal life and education ==
Batbold was born in the far eastern province of Dornod, Mongolia, to parents who worked as medical doctors in the provincial hospital. As a child, Batbold graduated from the 14th high school in Ulaanbaatar, going on to study in Russia at the Moscow State Institute of International Relations, one of the most prestigious educational establishments in the former Eastern Bloc, between 1980 and 1986. He was one of the first Mongolians to be given the opportunity to receive an education in the West and studied at the Middlesex University London Business School from 1989 until 1991, residing at Netherhall House. He also earned a doctoral degree at the Diplomatic Academy of the Russian Ministry for Foreign Affairs in Moscow in 2002.

Batbold previously held an executive position at Mongol Impex Cooperative. In 1992, he established Altai Trading Co. Ltd. (currently Altai Holding LLC), which, among others, owns the Chinggis Khaan Hotel, Altai Cashmere, E-Mart Mongolia hypermarket chain, and the Skytel cellular operator. He headed the company until 2000, by which time it became one of the largest Mongolian private companies. After Mongolia started a transition from one-party authoritarian rule to a market economy and democracy, he was one of the first Mongolians to start a private business and grow it into a large corporation. Among all of his businesses, only Chinggus Khaan Hotel was bought from the government at the auction in 1994 as a half-finished building in complete ruin, which was completed and served as a flagship hotel till 2016 when Shangri-la entered Mongolia. All other businesses were created from scratch and introduced new standards of service and competence.

== Political career ==
Batbold entered Mongolian politics in 2000, by which time he was already an established and well-known businessman. He was Deputy Minister of Foreign Affairs from 2000 to 2004 and became a member of the Leadership Council of the Mongolian People's Revolutionary Party (MPRP) in 2001. During his term as Deputy Foreign Minister, a decision was taken by Mongolia to contribute forces to multinational forces in Iraq and Afghanistan. He was instrumental in negotiating a visa regime with the USA under which US citizens became exempt from Mongolian visa requirements and Mongolian citizens became eligible for 10-year multiple entry visas.

Batbold held the Ulan Bator 75 constituency in the 2004 Mongolian Great Khural election. He then became Cabinet Minister of Trade and Industry between 2004 and 2006. As Minister of Trade and Industry, he actively contributed to the implementation of the Trade and Investment Framework Agreement (TIFA) with the United States, establishing an ongoing dialogue to help remove barriers to trade between the United States and Mongolia. Also during his term as Minister of Trade and Industry, Mongolia was awarded the GSP Plus system of trade preferences by the European Union, which allowed for preferential access to more than 7,000 export items from Mongolia. As cabinet minister, he also proposed for the first time in Mongolia the special tax and regulatory treatment for small and medium businesses by proposing special legislation to the Parliament.

In the 2008 Great Khural election, Batbold won a seat for the MPRP in the Ulan Bator 23 constituency in the same location of the capital city of Ulaanbaatar as during previous elections. He was the Minister of Foreign Affairs from 2008 until he was nominated to become prime minister in 2009. During his tenure as Minister of Foreign Affairs, he hosted United Nations Secretary-General Ban Ki-moon in Ulan Bator to discuss the topic of climate change in Mongolia. Batbold also substituted for then Prime Minister Bayar at a Prime Ministers' meeting of the Shanghai Cooperation Organisation.

=== Prime Minister and Chairman of the Mongolian People's Party ===
On October 29, 2009, Batbold was elected as the 26th Prime Minister of Mongolia, succeeding Sanjaa Bayar, who resigned for health reasons. Batbold received 62 of the 66 votes cast by members of the Mongolian Parliament.

On the 8th of April 2010, Batbold became the Chairman of the MPRP. This was confirmed with an election at the 26th MPRP Congress. During the Party Congress, Batbold was one of three proposed candidates for leadership, the others being Parliament Speaker Demberel Damdin and MP U. Enkhtuvshin. After D.Demberel withdrew his name from the list of candidates, voting continued until 4:30 a.m., ending with Batbold winning a majority of 85% (675 votes from 788 voters).

During the same party conference, it was also decided that the Mongolian People's Revolutionary Party would revert to its original name, the Mongolian People's Party. The name change was proposed by S. Batbold as chairman and Secretary-General of the party Ukhnaa Khurelsukh and signified the full transition to social-democratic values by the Mongolian People's Party. Before 1990, successive leaders of the MPRP ruled Mongolia under a one-party totalitarian regime, and this is the only party among the former communist camp that managed to stay competitive in the new democratic system by transitioning to social-democratic values along the lines of the German Social Democrats and the British Labor Party.

As prime minister, Batbold oversaw a number of notable developments.

His cabinet supported the enactment of the Law on Gender Equality in 2011. The law was significant in legislating the notions of legally punishing workplace harassment, introducing women's quotas in political election nominations, etc.

The reform and modernisation of the Mongolian Stock Exchange were initiated, and its board was filled with respectable independent members for the first time in its history, such as Peter Morrow, an American who was one of the most influential figures in establishing Mongolia's private banking system and Baatar Bold, a Mongolian with many years of experience in international banking who is currently one of the top executives of Rio Tinto, among others. The Board worked closely with the London Stock Exchange to reform MSE's systems. This was the first time in the history of state-owned companies in Mongolia that the board was composed of independent directors outside of government.

The cabinet launched a collaboration between the Government of Mongolia and a Cambridge University consortium to introduce the Cambridge International Education System into Mongolia's public schools and reform primary and secondary education in Mongolia. This was one of the most far-reaching educational reform efforts since the 1990s in Mongolia.

The Human Development Fund was established to not only pay cash dividends to the public but also fund education, health, and social insurance. It sought to emulate the experiences of Singapore's Central Provident Fund.

In 2010, Batbold held a cabinet meeting in the Gobi Desert to draw attention to climate change and the growing threat of desertification in Mongolia.

During his term as prime minister, the Mongolian economy grew by 17.5 percent in 2011, one of the highest globally. The poverty rates fell by double digits, and household income doubled. This achievement cannot be solely attributed to high mineral prices, as there have been even higher prices before and since his cabinet. Progressive policies that encouraged economic growth and, at the same time, sought to address social issues at a time of difficult transition were the main reason for such impressive results.

When he visited Canada in 2010, he told Canadian Prime Minister Steven Harper that Canada can serve as a role model for Mongolia because of similarities in resource endowments, sparse population, big territory, and most importantly, democratic values and development models. This visit sparked exchanges between the two countries in different areas, including efforts to reform the public service, following the Canadian example. These efforts culminated in the adoption of the revised Law of Civil Service in 2017 by the Parliament of Mongolia. The revised law introduces concepts of minimum required years of service for promotion, increases the independence and powers of the Civil Service Commission of Mongolia, and tightens merit-based requirements for initial recruitment.

Batbold also sought to initiate a transition to "European standards," which he defined as "not only commodities and physical standards, but also new standards related to laws and regulations, technologies, and mindsets, as well as to culture and lifestyle." He proposed in his speech to the Parliament in 2009, as he was taking over as prime minister:

"We can learn from our traditional partners’ experiences where they have recently joined the European Union and enjoy the benefits of such new standards. In bringing up their standards, they neither re-invented the wheel nor did they re-write laws according to one person's wishes. What they did was choose one standard to be followed, starting with changing road standards and adopting anti-corruption laws to suit local conditions and specifics. I believe this is where their successes have come from."

This was a remarkable statement of intention by the country located on a different continent from the European Union to self-adopt its norms and principles on a voluntary and unilateral basis in the absence of any incentives from the European Union. The EU offered its Eastern European Partners (mostly former Soviet republics) as a part of the Eastern Partnership initiative a road towards greater integration with the potential of joining the union in accordance with a mutually agreed path of democratic reform and market openness. Mongolia, obviously geographically distant, wasn't part of this initiative; however, it was initiating the "European standards" reforms without any intention or hope of joining the EU but because it saw a value in itself in those reforms. Batbold discussed this initiative when he hosted German Chancellor Merkel in Mongolia.

Batbold hosted many other world dignitaries in Mongolia, such as US Vice President Joseph Biden and Secretary of State Hillary Clinton.

At the same time, Batbold's cabinet adhered to the traditional foreign policy of Mongolia to maintain and strengthen relations with its only two neighbors, Russia and China. He visited Russia in 2010 and met with then-Prime Minister Vladimir Putin. He also visited China in 2011 and held negotiations with his counterpart, China's Premier Wen Jiabao and then Vice President and current paramount leader of China Xi Jinping. During his time as prime minister, trade with the two neighbors grew at unprecedented speed.

Batbold's term as prime minister saw a remarkable degree of high-level visits and exchanges with the country's most significant foreign partners, such as Japan, South Korea, India, Australia, and Singapore, among many others.

Overall, this policy of maintaining balanced and cooperative relations with the immediate two neighbors and perceived third neighbors (the term invented by State Secretary James Baker when he visited Mongolia in 1990 with whom Mongolia shares common democratic values) has been maintained consistently since the 1990s transition to democracy and market relations.

Ideologically, Batbold is a Third Way politician along the lines of Bill Clinton, Tony Blair, and Gerhard Schroeder, whose views were very much market-based on economics and centrist on social issues, which put them to the right of traditional social democratic views.

=== Continued political involvement ===
Since the end of his term as prime minister in 2012, Batbold has remained a member of Parliament. He is a member of Mongolia's delegation to the Organization for Security and Cooperation in the European Parliamentary Assembly.

He is Vice President of the Socialist International, an international organization registered at the United Nations (whose current Secretary-General António Guterres was Vice President of the Socialist International from 1999 until 2005) that brings together parties around the world on a social democratic platform.

Mr. S. Batbold is a strong supporter of public policy based on knowledge-based research and public debate. Therefore, he is one of the founders of the Mongolia Economic Forum and the Mongolian Development Strategy Institute, both dedicated to encouraging deeper public policy research and more open debate. He serves as Chairman of the Mongolia Development Strategy Institute, a think tank that hosts international events and undertakes research on public policy issues with a significant impact on Mongolia's development trajectory. The institute co-hosted such prestigious international events as the Williamsburg Conference in 2007, the Northeast Asia Regional Meeting of the Asia Pacific Leadership Network for Nuclear Non-proliferation and Disarmament in 2017, the Boao Forum for Asia Ulaanbaatar Conference in 2019, and the Regional Energy Workshop in 2019, among others. Its board members and contributors have published many books and articles on Mongolia's developmental challenges, trade and diplomacy, security, history, environment, and governance.

In November 2014, Batbold was elected to membership in the MPP Chamber of Advisers, and in December 2015, he once again joined the MPP Leadership Council. After winning a parliamentary seat for the fifth time in 2020, Batbold was elected chairman of the Great Khural Subcommittee on Special Oversight.

He was named by party officials as one of the potential candidates for the June 2021 presidential elections by the Mongolian People's Party and was nominated by some local party entities. As a result, he was the target of a smear campaign orchestrated by political opponents.

=== Legal proceedings ===
In 2017, the International Consortium of Investigative Journalists' (ICIJ) reported, based on the Panama Papers, that Batbold had held shares in an offshore company that owned a Mongolian company involved in mining. Batbold said that his offshore business interests were transparent and complied with applicable business and disclosure laws.

In 2020, Mongolian state entities brought civil proceedings alleging that Batbold had improperly benefited from transactions involving state-owned mining companies. Related proceedings were subsequently brought in several other jurisdictions, primarily to freeze assets while the Mongolian case was pending. Batbold denied the allegations.

The underlying Mongolian case was dismissed on 6 December 2021. In other words, that proceeding ended with a judgment finding that Batbold had not committed the alleged corruption. The dismissal was later recorded by the U.S. District Court for the Southern District of New York.

Proceedings connected to the same litigation subsequently ended in other jurisdictions. In Hong Kong, the High Court discharged the injunction against Batbold and struck out the related proceeding in 2022, noting that the underlying Mongolian proceeding had already been dismissed. In Singapore, related proceedings against two defendants were dismissed without a trial after the plaintiffs ceased pursuing them; the Singapore High Court also recorded that an earlier freezing order against those defendants had been discharged.

In March 2024, the United States Department of Justice filed a separate civil forfeiture case seeking the forfeiture of two Manhattan apartments purchased for approximately US$14 million. The government alleges that the properties were acquired using proceeds connected to improperly awarded Mongolian mining contracts. Batbold denies the allegations and has not been criminally charged in connection with the case. The Department of Justice itself states that a civil forfeiture complaint is only an allegation and that the allegations are not proven unless a court enters judgment in favor of the United States.

In 2026, Batbold sought to intervene in the U.S. proceeding to challenge the government's allegations and pursue dismissal or summary judgment. Public reporting in June 2026 continued to describe the civil forfeiture proceeding as pending.

Party political offices
| Preceded by Sanjaagiin Bayar | General Secretary of the Mongolian People's Party; 2010–2012 | Succeeded by Ölziisaikhany Enkhtüvshin |
Political offices
| Preceded by Sanjaagiin Bayar | Prime Minister of Mongolia; 2009–2012 | Succeeded by Norovyn Altankhuyag |
