= Politics of Mongolia =

Politics of Mongolia Монголын улс төр (Mongolian)
- State emblem of Mongolia
- Polity type: Unitary semi-presidential
- Constitution: Constitution of Mongolia

Legislative branch
- Name: State Great Khural
- Type: Unicameral
- Meeting place: Government Palace
- Presiding officer: Sandagiin Byambatsogt, Chairman of the State Great Khural

Executive branch
- Head of state
- Title: President
- Currently: Ukhnaagiin Khürelsükh
- Appointer: Direct popular vote
- Cabinet
- Name: Government of Mongolia
- Leader: Prime Minister
- Deputy leader: First Deputy Prime Minister
- Appointer: Prime Minister
- Headquarters: Government Palace
- Ministries: 16

Judicial branch
- Name: Judiciary of Mongolia
- Supreme Court
- Constitutional Court

The politics of Mongolia takes place in a framework of a parliamentary system with a multi-party representative democracy. Mongolia is described as a semi-presidential system.

The government is headed by the Prime Minister of Mongolia, who is appointed by and accountable to the State Great Khural (Parliament). Executive power is exercised by the President of Mongolia, Prime Minister, and the Cabinet. The President serves as the head of state, primarily in the areas of foreign policy and national security, as well as being the Commander-in-Chief of the Armed Forces. The President also has veto power over laws passed by Parliament, though this can be overridden by a two-thirds parliamentary majority.

Legislative power is vested in the State Great Khural, a unicameral parliament. Judicial power is vested in the Supreme Court, and is independent of the executive and legislature, as guaranteed by the Constitution.

Mongolia held its first democratic elections in 1990, following a peaceful 1990 revolution. From 1921 to 1990, Mongolia was a communist single-party state under the Mongolian People's Revolutionary Party. Historically, Mongolian politics has been influenced by its two large neighbors, Russia and China.

== History ==
=== Socialist period and single party government (1921–1990) ===
The Mongolian People's Revolutionary Party ruled the Mongolian People's Republic for its entire existence

Shortly after the Mongolian Revolution of 1921, Mongolia adopted a one-party socialist republican constitution modeled after the Soviet Union; only the communist party — the Mongolian People's Revolutionary Party (MPRP) — was officially permitted to function. Mongolian politics was closely monitored and directed by Kremlin. Any political opposition was brutally repressed, and government officials who opposed the Soviet influence were murdered, executed or sent to labour camps. During the communist regime, collectivisation of livestock, introduction of modern agriculture, limited industrialisation and the urbanisation were carried out without perceptible popular opposition.

=== Democratic revolution (1990) ===
The perestroika in the Soviet Union and the democracy movements across Eastern Europe had a profound impact on Mongolian politics. On the morning of 10 December 1989, the first open pro-democracy demonstration was held in front of the Youth Cultural Centre in Ulaanbaatar, the capital city of the Mongolian People's Republic. During the demonstrations, Tsakhiagiin Elbegdorj, one of the leading pro-democracy leaders, announced the establishment of the Mongolian Democratic Union, a pro-democracy non-governmental organization and political movement.

Over the next months activists, led by 13 leaders, continued to organise demonstrations, rallies, protests and hunger strikes, as well as teachers' and workers' strikes. Activists had growing support from Mongolians, both in the capital and the countryside. Efforts made by trade unions across the country for democracy had a significant impact on the success of the movement. After demonstrations of tens of thousands of people in freezing weather in the capital city and provincial centres, the Politburo of the Central Committee of the MPRP gave way to the pressure and entered negotiations with the leaders of the democratic movement in March. Jambyn Batmönkh, chairman of the Politburo, decided to dissolve the Politburo and to resign on 9 March 1990, paving the way for the first multi-party elections in Mongolia. In the 1990 parliamentary elections, the MPRP retained its majority in both chambers with relatively minor opposition party gains. As a result, Mongolia became the first country in Asia to successfully transition into democracy from communist rule.

=== Post-revolution development (1990–1992) ===
As a result of the democratic movement that led to 1990 Democratic Revolution, the constitution was amended, removing reference to the MPRP's role as the leading political force in the country, legalising opposition parties and creating a standing legislative body and the office of president in May 1990.

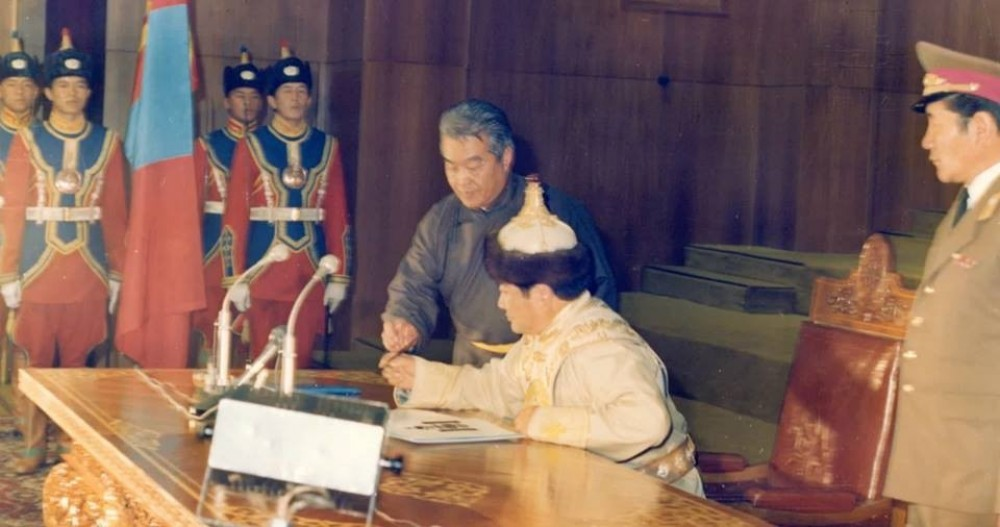
President Punsalmaagiin Ochirbat ratifying the Constitution of Mongolia on 13 January 1992

Mongolia's first multi-party free and fair elections for the People's Great Khural (upper chamber) were held on 29 July 1990. The MPRP won 85% of the seats. The People's Great Khural first commenced on 3 September and elected the president (MPRP), the vice-president (MSDP), the prime minister (MPRP), and 50 members to the State Little Khural (lower chamber). The vice president was also the speaker of the Little Khural.

In November 1991, the People's Great Khural began discussion on a new constitution and adopted it on 13 January 1992. The Constitution of Mongolia entered into force on 12 February 1992. In addition to establishing Mongolia as an independent, sovereign republic and guaranteeing a number of rights and freedoms, the new constitution restructured the legislative branch of government via the creation of a unicameral legislature, the State Great Khural, with 76 members. The 1992 constitution provided that the president would be directly elected by popular vote rather than by the legislature as before. In June 1993, incumbent Punsalmaagiin Ochirbat won the first direct presidential election, running as the joint candidate of the democratic opposition.

As the supreme legislative organ, the State Great Khural is empowered to enact and amend laws, regarding domestic and foreign policy, to ratify international agreements, and declare a state of emergency by the constitution. The State Great Khural meets semi-annually. The parliamentary election holds place every four years, but the electoral system varied in each election. The current electoral system is based on plurality-on-large with 29 electoral districts. The Speaker of the State Great Khural is elected by the members of the parliament, and one deputy speaker is appointed by each political party or coalition with at least 10 seats in the parliament.

== Political developments ==
=== Since the 1990s ===
Until June 1996, the predominant party in Mongolia was the Mongolian People's Revolutionary Party (MPRP). The country's first democratically elected president was Punsalmaagiin Ochirbat, who served from September 1990 to June 1997. Ochirbat was a member of the MPRP until the 1993 presidential election, when he was nominated as a candidate by the opposition Mongolian Social Democratic Party (MSDP) and the Mongolian National Democratic Party (MNDP).

Tsakhiagiin Elbegdorj, as the chairman of the MNDP, co-led the Democratic Union Coalition to its first historic victory in the 1996 parliamentary elections, winning 50 of the 76 parliamentary seats. The Democratic Union, between the MNDP, the MSDP and the Mongolian Green Party, was in power from 1996 to 2000. Mendsaikhany Enkhsaikhan (MSDP), election manager of coalition, worked as the prime minister from 7 July 1996 to 23 April 1998. In 1998, a clause in the constitution was removed that prohibited members of parliament to take cabinet responsibility. Thus on 23 April 1998, the parliament elected (61–6) MNDP chairman and coalition majority leader Elbegdorj as prime minister. Due to the minority MPRP's demand, Elbegdorj lost a confidence vote in July 1998, triggering a prolonged government crisis. He stayed as caretaker prime minister until a successor was nominated and approved by both then-president Natsagiin Bagabandi and the State Great Khural. Natsagiin Bagabandi (MPRP) was elected as the country's second president in the 1997 presidential election, defeating sitting president Ochirbat by a large margin.

On 9 December 1998, Elbegdorj was succeeded by Ulaanbaatar mayor Janlavyn Narantsatsralt (MNDP). Janlavyn Narantsatsralt worked as the prime minister for eight months until his resignation in July 1999. Rinchinnyamyn Amarjargal (MNDP) became the MNDP's new chairman and served as the prime minister from 30 July 1999 to 26 July 2000.

=== Since the 2000s ===
As a result of the 2000 parliamentary elections, the MPRP was back in power in the parliament with a supermajority of 72 seats. MPRP chairman Nambaryn Enkhbayar was appointed the head of government on 26 July 2000. Consequently, the MPRP secured the legislature, the cabinet, and the presidency. Incumbent president Natsagiin Bagabandi was re-elected in the 2001 presidential election, becoming the first president to serve two terms, which lasted until 2005.

The vote in the 2004 parliamentary elections was evenly split between the two major political forces – the ruling MPRP and the opposition Motherland Democratic Coalition between the Democratic Party (DP), the Motherland Party and the Civil Will–Republican Party. Neither side had the absolute majority to form a government. Thus, a grand coalition government between the Motherland Democratic Coalition and the MPRP was established. On 20 August 2004, Elbegdorj became the prime minister for the second time as the leader of the coalition government.

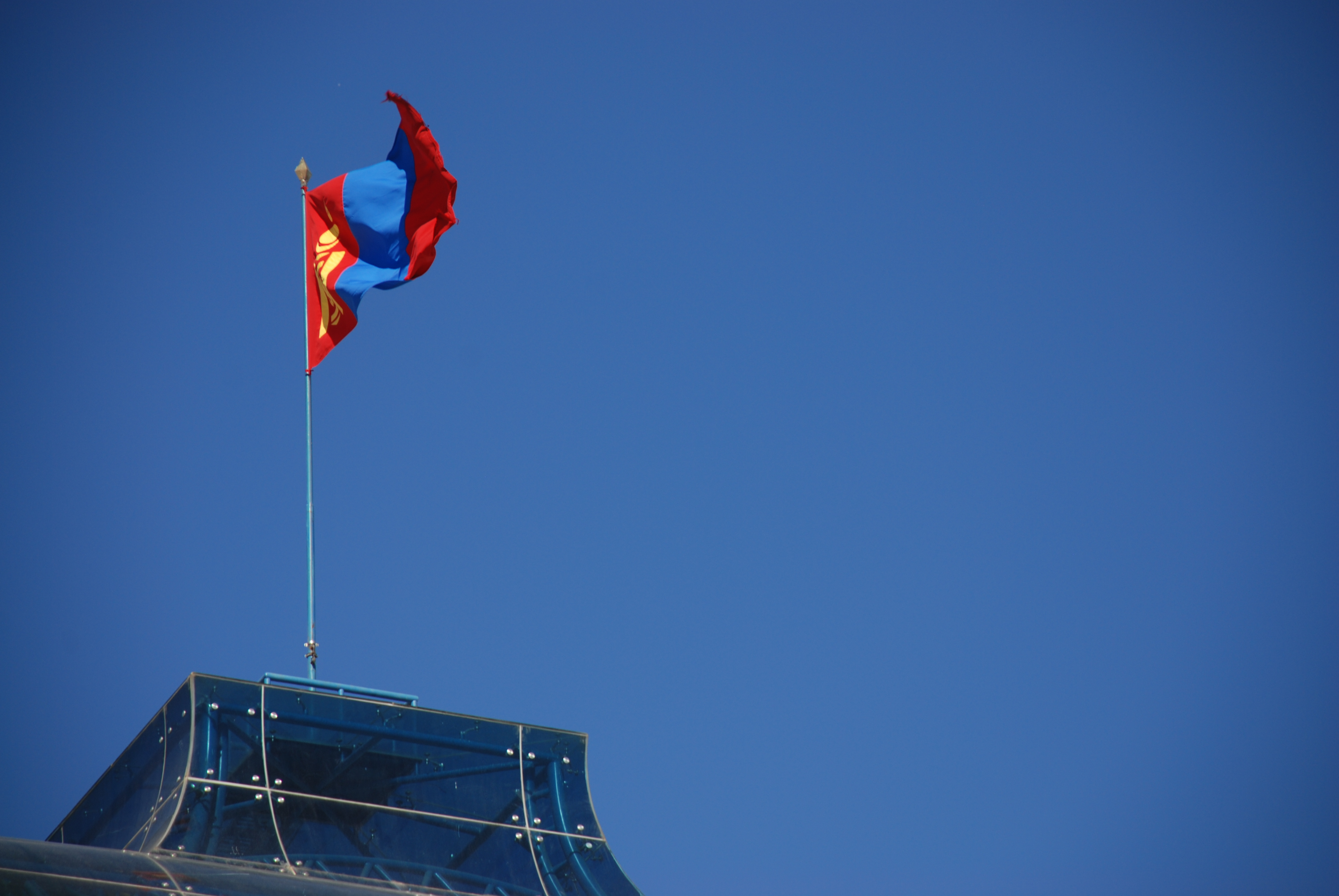
Flag of Mongolia waving on top of the Government Palace, 2009

In the 2005 presidential election, former prime minister and parliamentary speaker Nambaryn Enkhbayar (MPRP) was elected as the country's president in a four-way race.

Following a series of political developments in 2005, the political balance in parliament shifted towards the MPRP by late 2005 due to the defection of several lawmakers from the DP. Subsequently, in January 2006, the MPRP exitted the coalition government, causing Elbegdorj's cabinet to collapse. A new cabinet partnered with minor parliamentary parties was established by then MPRP leader Miyeegombyn Enkhbold. He was replaced by the party's new chairman, Sanjiin Bayar, in 2007.

In the 2008 parliamentary elections, the MPRP won 45 of the 76 seats while the DP won 27 seats with the three remaining seats going to minor parties and an independent. The landslide victory of the MPRP triggered concerns of electoral fraud amongst the opposition. Soon on 1 July 2008, a peaceful demonstration against vote rigging turned into a riot that led to the burning of the MPRP headquarters; looting of several nearby businesses; and the declaration of a 4-day state of emergency. After a month-long political deadlock, the MPRP formed a coalition government with the DP despite having enough seats to govern alone.

In the 2009 presidential election, the DP candidate Tsakhiagiin Elbegdorj defeated incumbent president Nambaryn Enkhbayar. Elbegdorj was sworn into office on 18 June 2009 and became Mongolia's first non-MPRP member president and the first to obtain a Western education.

=== Since the 2010s ===
In 2010, the former communist MPRP reverted to its original 1921 name, the Mongolian People's Party (MPP), and shifted from democratic socialism to social democracy. Following his defeat in the presidential election and party leadership change, ex-president Nambaryn Enkhbayar established a new political party, the Mongolian People's Revolutionary Party, after the Supreme Court permitted the use of the old name of the MPP in 2010. Enkhbayar became the chairman of the new party.

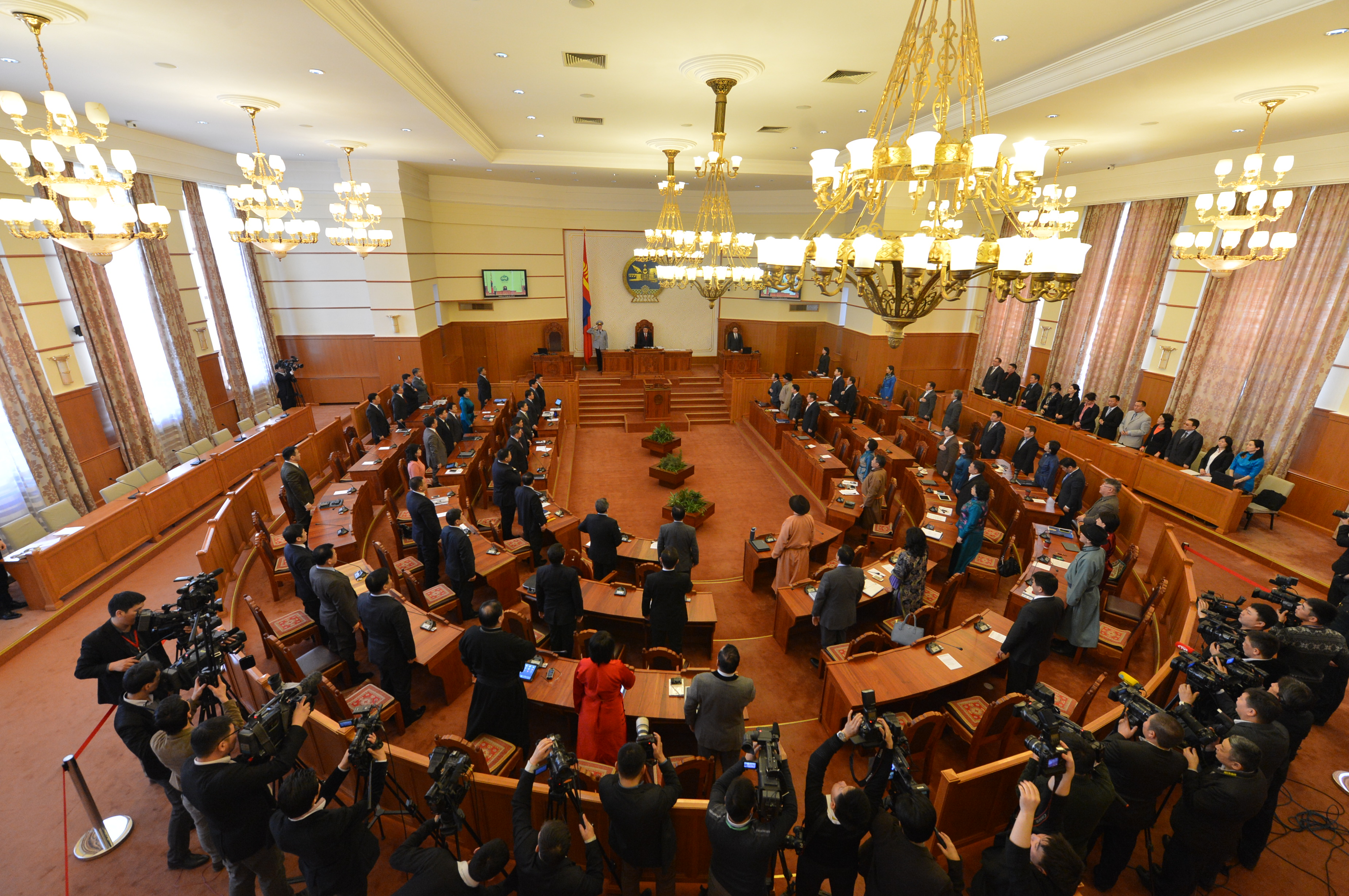
State Great Khural, the parliament of Mongolia, during the opening of its spring session in March 2014

In June 2012, the DP won the 2012 parliamentary elections and became the plurality in the parliament with 34 seats while the MPP secured only 26 seats. The DP established a coalition government with the Civil Will–Green Party and the Justice Coalition, between the new MPRP and the Mongolian National Democratic Party. Incumbent president Elbegdorj was re-elected in the 2013 presidential election on 26 June 2013. Between 2012 and 2016, the DP controlled both the presidency and the government.

Due to an economic downfall and unpopularity, the governing DP suffered a landslide defeat in the 2016 parliamentary election. Despite receiving over 30% of the total constituency vote, the DP was reduced to only 9 seats, primarily due to the electoral change to first-past-the-post voting. In contrast, the MPP, with better organization nationwide, won a supermajority of 65 seats. Former governor of Selenge Province and finance minister, Jargaltulgyn Erdenebat, became the prime minister of an all-MPP cabinet.

The now-opposition DP narrowly retained the presidency in the 2017 presidential election, in which Khaltmaagiin Battulga was elected to succeed outgoing two-term president Elbegdorj. The defeat of MPP chairman and 2017 presidential nominee, Miyeegombyn Enkhbold, led to an infighting within the party. The infighting caused the dismissal of prime minister Erdenebat and appointment of Ukhnaagiin Khürelsükh, who later became the party chairman, in late 2017. Since 2016, Mongolia had a divided government, with the MPP having an overwhelming majority in the State Great Khural, while the DP held the presidency.

=== Since the 2020s ===
On 24 June 2020, the incumbent MPP was re-elected to the parliament with another landslide victory. Prime minister Khürelsükh continued to head the cabinet during the COVID-19 pandemic. Protests over the treatment of a coronavirus patient in early 2021 led to the resignation of prime minister Khürelsükh and his cabinet. Luvsannamsrain Oyun-Erdene (MPP) became the new prime minister on 27 January 2021. He represented a younger generation of leaders who had studied abroad. Later, in June 2021, former prime minister Khürelsükh, the candidate of the ruling MPP, became the country's sixth democratically elected and current president after winning the 2021 presidential election. Incumbent president Battulga was barred from running for a second term due to constitutional amendments in 2020. In August 2022, Prime Minister Oyun-Erdene made a cabinet reshuffle to get legislative support in pushing his liberalization and privatization agenda forward.

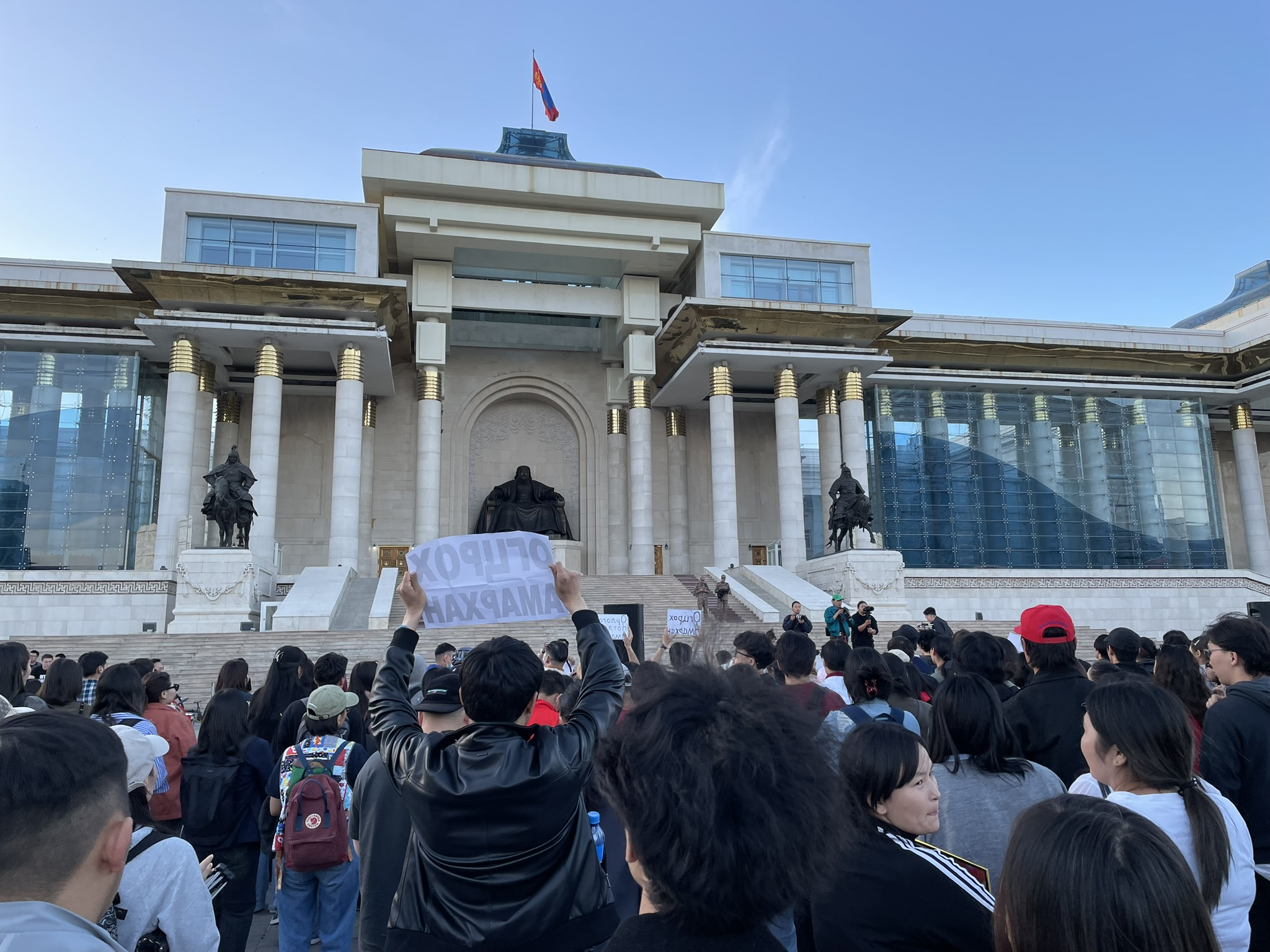
Protests in 2025 led to a party turmoil within the MPP later that year. Consequently, within a year, Mongolia had three prime ministers.

In the 2024 parliamentary election, Oyun-Erdene was re-appointed as prime minister after the MPP won a reduced majority. The opposition DP won 42 of the 126 seats in the expanded State Great Khural. Remaining seats were won by the HUN Party (8), the Civil Will–Green Party (4), and the National Coalition (4). Oyun-Erdene formed a coalition government between the MPP, the DP and the HUN party. This government lasted until mid 2025, when a series of anti-government youth protests caused prime minister Oyun-Erdene to lose a motion of confidence in parliament. Unseated legislator and former speaker Gombojavyn Zandanshatar succeeded Oyun-Erdene and formed a coalition government without the DP in June 2025.

The question of the next MPP chairman within the party provoked a party infighting between two camps allied with incumbent Zandanshatar and speaker Dashzegviin Amarbayasgalan. The month-long crisis was defused in November after both politicians pulled their candidacy infavor of party unity. Nyam-Osoryn Uchral was elected the MPP chairperson and succeeded parliamentary speaker Amarbayasgalan, who resigned in October. The appointment of MPP chairman Uchral as speaker was opposed by the DP, which later boycotted all parliamentary procedures in March 2026 to force his resignation. Prime minister Zandanshatar resigned soon after to prevent the political deadlock amidst an economic uncertainty caused by the 2026 Iran war. Uchral succeeded Zandanshatar and currently heads a coalition government between the MPP, the HUN party, and the National Coalition.

== Executive branch ==
Main office-holders
Office	Name	Party	Since
President	Ukhnaagiin Khürelsükh	Mongolian People's Party	25 June 2021
Prime Minister	Nyam-Osoryn Uchral	Mongolian People's Party	30 March 2026

=== President ===
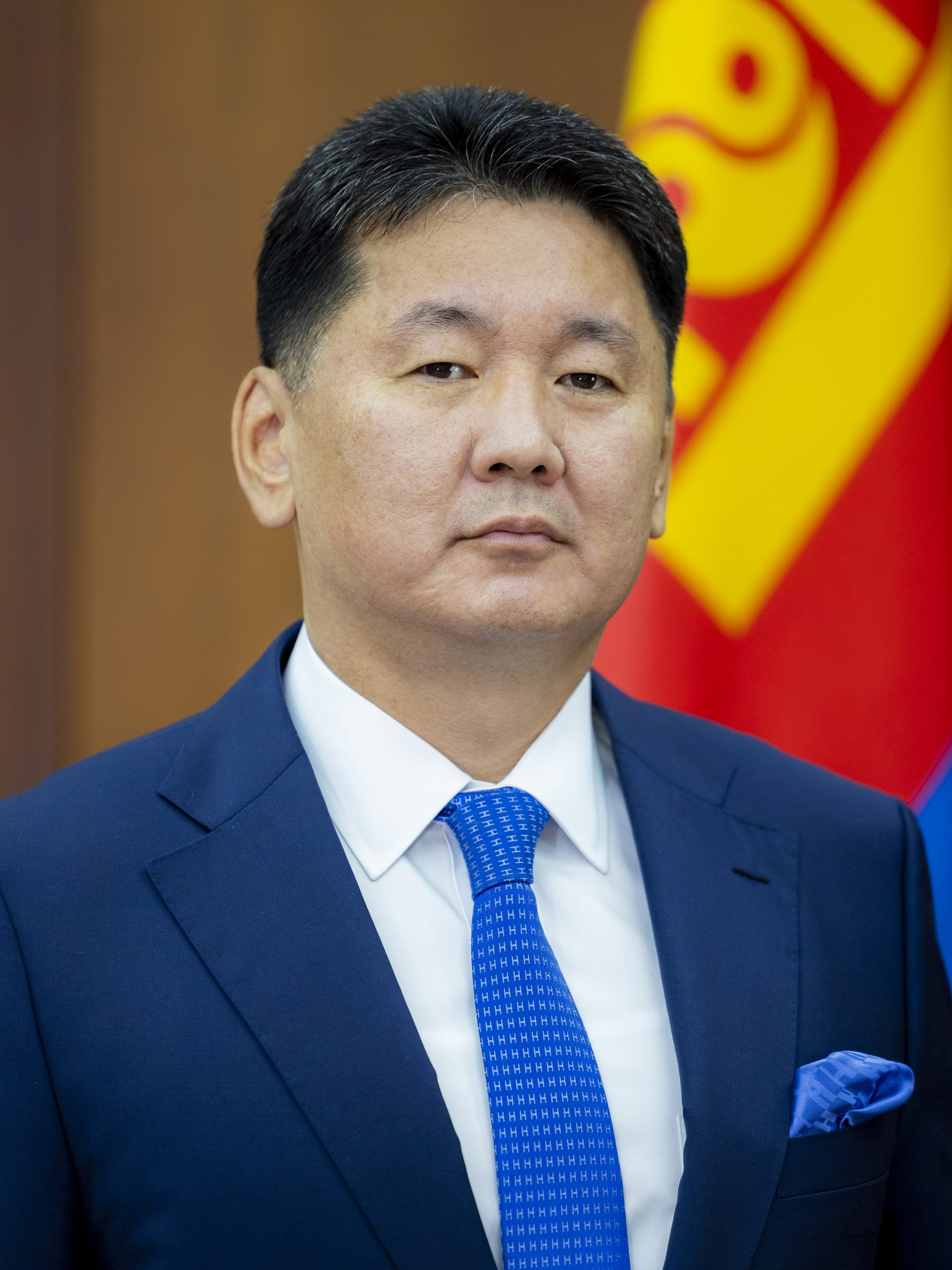
Current President Ukhnaagiin Khürelsükh

Presidential candidates are nominated by parties with parliamentary representation in the State Great Khural. The president is elected by popular vote for a non-renewable six-year term. The president is the head of state, commander-in-chief of the Armed Forces, and head of the National Security Council. The constitution empowers the president to propose a prime minister (upon the recommendation by the dominant political party), call for the government's dismissal (the two-thirds majority of vote needed in the State Great Khural), initiate legislation, veto all or parts of a legislation (the State Great Khural can override the veto with a two-thirds majority), and issue decrees (effective with the prime minister's countersignature).

In the absence, incapacity, or resignation of the president, the Speaker of the State Great Khural exercises presidential power until the inauguration of a newly elected president. Although the president has limited executive powers, they represent the nation internationally, sign international treaties and conventions, and advise the cabinet on important socioeconomic issues. After being elected, the president-elect must give up their party affiliations to act as the "symbol of unity".

In June 2021, former Prime Minister Ukhnaagiin Khürelsükh won the presidential election. He was inaugurated on 25 June 2021, currently serving as the sixth President of Mongolia.

=== Cabinet ===
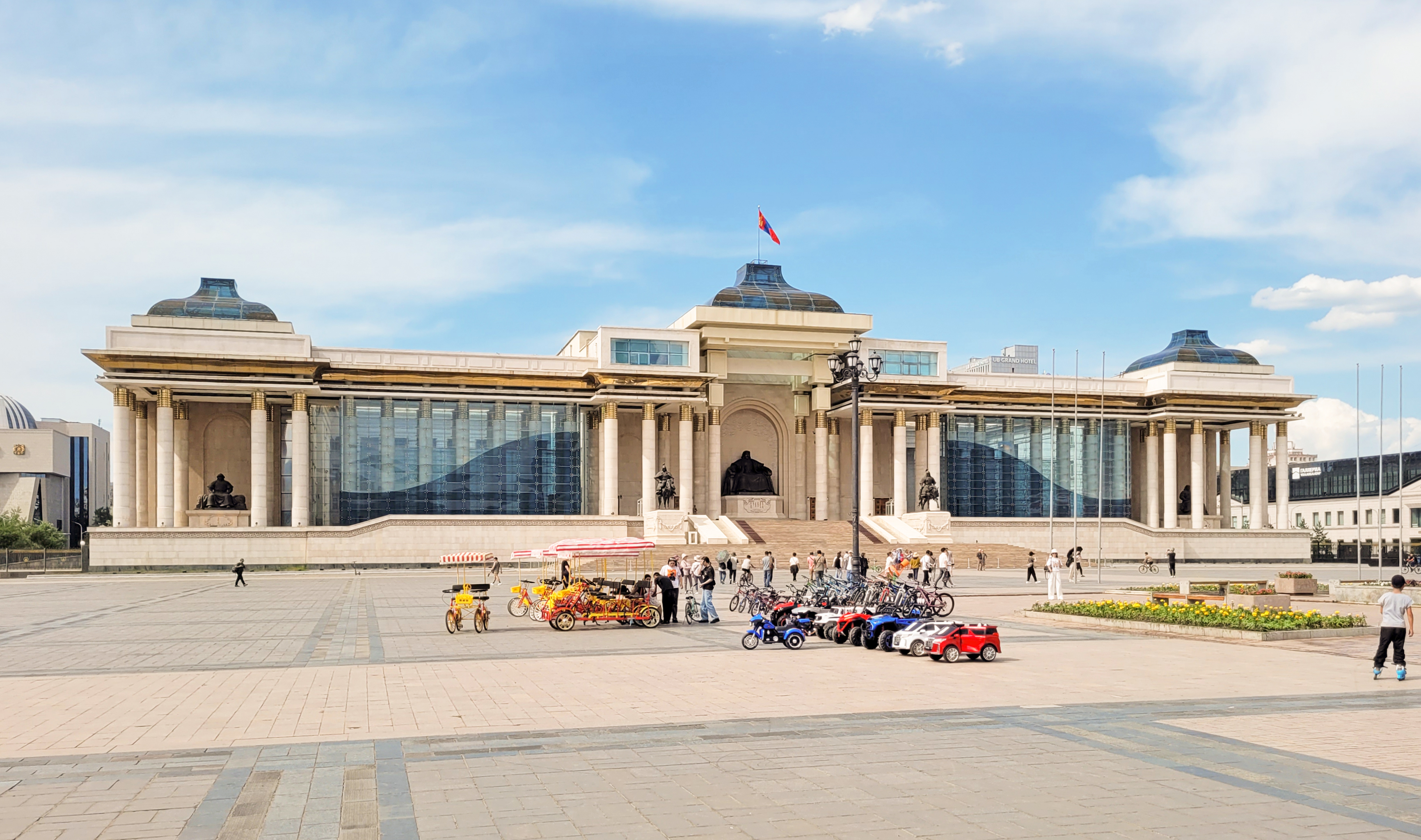
The Government Palace is the seat of the Mongolian cabinet and the legislature.

The Cabinet, headed by the Prime Minister of Mongolia, has a four-year term. The president appoints the prime minister after each parliamentary election and appoints the members of the Government on the recommendation of the prime minister. If the president is not able to reach a consensus with the prime minister on the appointment of the Cabinet within a week, the issue is submitted the State Great Khural. Dismissal of the government occurs upon the prime minister's resignation, simultaneous resignation of half the cabinet, or after the State Great Khural voted for a motion of censure.

The prime minister holds much of the executive powers in Mongolian politics. Unlike the president, the prime minister is chosen by the party (or coalition) with the majority of seats in the State Great Khural. Typically, the prime minister leads a major political party and generally commands the majority in the State Great Khural.

Party	Ministers	Percentage
Mongolian People's Party	16	84%
HUN Party	2	11%
National Coalition	1	5%
Total	19	100%

№	Office(s)	Portrait	Minister Constituency	Party	Took office	Left office
1	Prime Minister		Nyam-Osoryn Uchral; MP for 10th Chingeltei, Sükhbaatar	MPP	30 March 2026	Incumbent
2	First Deputy Prime Minister of Mongolia and Minister of Economy and Development		Jadambyn Enkhbayar; MP for 5th Darkhan-Uul, Selenge, Töv Province	MPP	25 November 2025 (renewed on 4 April 2026)	Incumbent
3	Deputy Prime Minister		Togmidyn Dorjkhand; Party list	HUN	10 July 2024 (renewed on 4 April 2026)	Incumbent
4	Deputy Prime Minister		Nyamtaishiryn Nomtoibayar; Party list	National Coalition	4 April 2026	Incumbent
5	Chief Cabinet Secretary		Battömöriin Enkhbayar; MP for 8th Bayanzürkh District	MPP	4 April 2026	Incumbent
6	Minister of Foreign Affairs		Batmönkhiin Battsetseg; MP for 1st Arkhangai, Bayankhongor, Övörkhangai Province	MPP	29 January 2021 (renewed on 4 April 2026)	Incumbent
7	Minister of Finance		Zagdjavyn Mendsaikhan; MP for 2nd Govi-Altai, Khovd, Uvs, Zavkhan Province	MPP	4 April 2026	Incumbent
8	Minister of Justice and Internal Affairs		Sainbuyangiin Amarsaikhan; MP for 13th Bagakhangai, Baganuur, Nalaikh District	MPP	4 April 2026	16 September 2026 (dismissed)
8	Minister of Justice and Internal Affairs		Ganzorigiin Temüülen; MP for 1st Arkhangai, Bayankhongor, Övörkhangai Province	MPP	22 September 2026	Incumbent
9	Minister of Mining and Heavy Industry		Gongoryn Damdinnyam; MP for 5th Darkhan-Uul, Selenge, Töv Province	MPP	18 June 2025 (renewed on 4 April 2026)	Incumbent
10	Ministry of Defense		Dambyn Batlut; MP for 4th Bulgan, Khövsgöl, Orkhon Province	MPP	18 June 2025 (renewed on 4 April 2026)	Incumbent
11	Minister of Environment and Climate Change		Tsendiin Sandag-Ochir; MP for 13th Bagakhangai, Baganuur, Nalaikh District	MPP	4 April 2026	Incumbent
12	Minister of Education		Luvsantserengiin Enkh-Amgalan; MP for 4th Bulgan, Khövsgöl, Orkhon Province	MPP	4 April 2026	Incumbent
13	Minister of Family, Labor and Social Protection		Telukhany Aubakir; MP for 3rd Bayan-Ölgii Province	MPP	18 June 2025 (renewed on 4 April 2026)	Incumbent
14	Minister of Road and Transport Development		Borkhüügiin Delgersaikhan; MP for 7th Govisümber, Dornogovi, Dundgovi, Ömnögovi Province	MPP	10 July 2024 (renewed on 4 April 2026)	Incumbent
15	Minister of Culture, Sports, Tourism, and Youth		Jukovyn Aldarjavkhlan; MP for 12th Khan-Uul District	MPP	4 April 2026	Incumbent
16	Minister of Construction, Urban Development, and Housing		Enkhtaivany Bat-Amgalan; MP for 8th Bayanzürkh District	MPP	18 June 2025 (renewed on 4 April 2026)	Incumbent
17	Minister of Food, Agriculture and Light Industry		Tsagaankhüügiin Iderbat; MP for 6th Dornod, Khentii, Sükhbaatar Province	MPP	4 April 2026	Incumbent
18	Minister of Digital Development, Innovation, and Communications		Chinbatyn Nomin; MP for 11th Songinokhairkhan District	MPP	4 April 2026	Incumbent
19	Minister of Energy		Badrakhyn Naidalaa; Party list	HUN	4 April 2026	Incumbent
20	Minister of Health		Enkhbayaryn Batshugar; MP for 11th Songinokhairkhan District	MPP	4 April 2026	Incumbent

=== Parliament ===
The State Great Khural (Mongolian: Улсын Их Хурал, romanized: Ulsyn Ikh Khural, meaning 'State Great Assembly') is a unicameral legislative body with 126 seats. The State Great Khural wields some of the most important powers in Mongolian politics. Parliamentary elections are held every four years, and 126 representatives are chosen. The current electoral system is based on plurality-at-large with 29 electoral districts across the country. According to the Constitution, every Mongolian citizen over the age of 18 can participate in elections, or run for government offices including the State Great Khural. Although there are several controversies (such as the right to vote of prisoners and Mongolian nationals abroad), the US government-funded agency Freedom House considers Mongolia to be a free representative democracy.

The State Great Khural is charged with the passage of legislation, approval of treaties, confirmation of the Government ministers and hearings of various government officials. Members of the State Great Khural have immunity against court trials, and the right to inspect government documents as an accountability on the Government's activities.

The Parliament of Mongolia
Name	Position	Political Party
Mr Sandagiin Byambatsogt	Chairman of the State Great Khural	Mongolian People's Party
Mr Jadambyn Bat-Erdene	Deputy Chairman of the State Great Khural	Mongolian People's Party
Mr Bökhchuluuny Pürevdorj	Deputy Chairman of the State Great Khural	Democratic Party
Mr Jigjidiin Batjargal	Leader of the Mongolian People's Party Caucus in the Parliament	Mongolian People's Party
Mr Odongiin Tsogtgerel	Leader of the Democratic Party Caucus in the Parliament	Democratic Party

== Political parties and elections ==
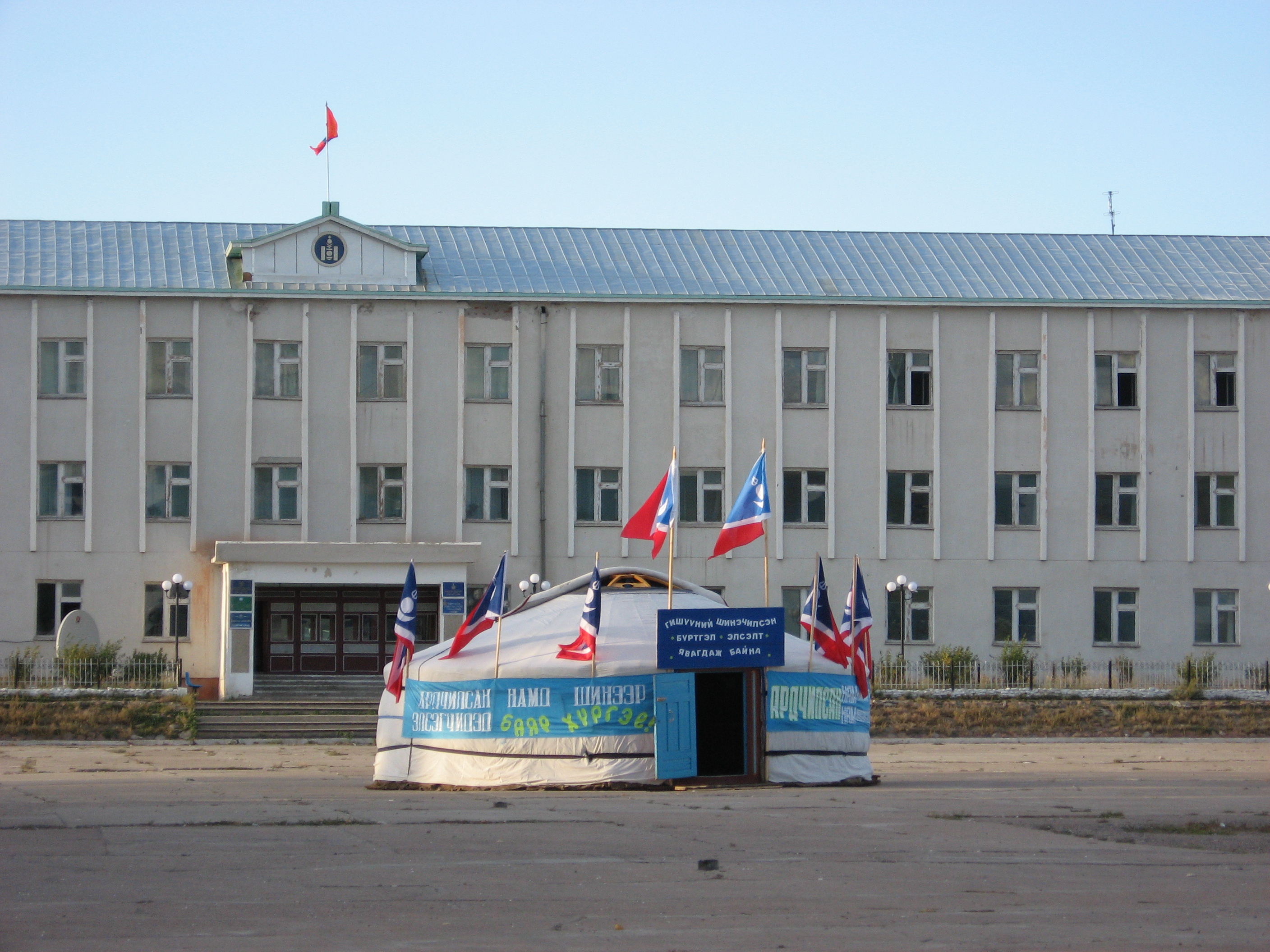
Ger set up by the Democratic Party for an election campaign in Khövsgöl aimag, 2006

Mongolian politics is currently dominated by two major political parties: the Mongolian People's Party (160,000 members) and the Democratic Party (150,000 members). After the 1990 Democratic Revolution, then-ruling Mongolian People's Revolutionary Party (MPRP) transitioned into a centre-left social democratic party. Since the fall of the Soviet regime, the MPRP has been able to maintain a high level of nationwide support, especially among rural voters.

In late 2010, the MPRP changed its name to the Mongolian People's Party (MPP) along with modifications in the party manifesto and leadership; however, former president Nambaryn Enkhbayar's faction and other conservative members departed from the party and created a new political party taking the original name, Mongolian People's Revolutionary Party. The splinter MPRP would become the primary third-party force from 2010 to 2021, until its merger with the MPP.

Contrary to the MPP, the Democratic Party (DP) was established relatively recently, in December 2000, following the merger of five opposition parties led by the leaders of the 1990 Democratic Revolution. The DP is a centre-right liberal conservative political party.

In late 2018 and 2019, a major corruption scandal involving SMEs and the government occurred. Subsequently, major anti-government protests erupted, leading to a significant increase in public distrust for the political establishment and support for opposition minor parties. Despite the landslide victory of the MPP in the 2020 elections, the vote share for minor parties substantially increased. The Right Person Electorate Coalition, led by the National Labour Party (NLP), won several seats in both the State Great Khural and municipal councils. In the 2021 presidential election, the NLP candidate received 20% of the vote, beating the Democratic candidate, who had won 6%. The NLP later changed its name to the HUN Party and its position from centre-left to centre-right politics in 2022.

In the 2024 parliamentary election, five parties were elected to the State Great Khural, making the current parliament the most politically diverse and the first five-party parliament to be ever convened in Mongolia. As of October 2025, there are 37 political parties recognised by the Supreme Court. However, critics argue that there are no significant ideological differences between the political parties on issues such as economic policies and governance.

=== 2021 presidential election ===
Second place by administrative divisions: Khürelsükh Enkhbat Erdene Blank

Polls opened at 07:00 in 2,087 polling stations across the country for the 2 million registered voters, with special measures in place due to the COVID-19 pandemic in Mongolia. Voting ended at 22:00. Khürelsükh and Erdene voted in Ulaanbaatar, while Enkhbat tested positive for COVID-19 and voted in the hospital.

Candidate	Party	Votes	%
Ukhnaagiin Khürelsükh	Mongolian People's Party	823,326	67.76
Dangaasürengiin Enkhbat	Right Person Electorate Coalition	246,968	20.33
Sodnomzunduin Erdene	Democratic Party	72,832	5.99
Blank votes		71,937	5.92
Total		1,215,063	100.00
Total votes		1,215,063	–
Registered voters/turnout		2,049,379	59.29
Source: General Election Commission

Vote share
Khürelsükh	67.76%
Enkhbat	20.33%
Erdene	5.99%
Blank votes	5.92%

Results of Khürelsükh by administrative divisions

Results of Enkhbat by administrative divisions

Results of Erdene by administrative divisions

=== By area ===
Subdivision	Ukhnaagiin Khürelsükh MPP		Dangaasürengiin Enkhbat RPEC		Sodnomzunduin Erdene DP	
Subdivision	Votes	%	Votes	%	Votes	%
Aimags of Mongolia
Arkhangai	23,870	69.85%	3,046	8.91%	6,186	18.10%
Bayan-Ölgii	29,474	81.53%	1,616	4.47%	2,636	7.29%
Bayankhongor	23,522	74.60%	2,507	7.95%	1,898	6.02%
Bulgan	17,825	78.34%	2,290	10.06%	1,401	6.16%
Govi-Altai	18,336	84.60%	1,640	7.57%	1,099	5.07%
Govisümber	5,032	76.87%	846	12.92%	414	6.32%
Dornogovi	20,434	74.62%	4,336	15.83%	1,476	5.39%
Dornod	21,291	73.98%	4,292	14.91%	1,433	4.98%
Dundgovi	12,786	79.06%	1,726	10.67%	856	5.29%
Zavkhan	22,058	76.21%	3,220	11.12%	1,915	6.62%
Övörkhangai	32,879	79.32%	4,284	10.33%	1,915	4.62%
Ömnögovi	17,870	74.16%	3,170	13.16	1,625	6.74%
Sükhbaatar	23,215	87.28%	1,356	5.10%	880	3.31%
Selenge	25,149	69.93%	5,901	16.41%	2,401	6.68%
Töv	26,481	78.38%	4,073	12.05%	1,560	4.62%
Uvs	23,642	77.49%	2,689	8.81%	1,063	3.48%
Khovd	24,366	73.96%	4,176	12.68%	3,349	10.17%
Khövsgöl	32,931	68.11%	7,937	16.42%	4,901	10.14%
Khentii	26,356	82.52%	2,393	7.49%	2,361	7.39%
Darkhan-Uul	24,714	67.46%	7,764	21.19%	1,628	4.44%
Orkhon	27,408	68.94%	7,962	20.03%	1,530	3.85%
Düüregs of Ulaanbaatar
Khan-Uul	55,183	68.67%	27,890	34.70%	4,063	5.06%
Baganuur	7,940	72.43%	1,920	17.52%	670	6.11%
Bagakhangai	1,492	84.53%	155	8.78%	65	3.68%
Bayanzürkh	82,796	59.32%	42,414	30.39%	5,627	4.03%
Nalaikh	10,309	72.51%	2,570	18.08%	667	4.69%
Sükhbaatar	32,710	56.74%	18,090	31.38%	3,193	5.54%
Chingeltei	35,830	61.69%	15,680	27.00%	2,757	4.75%
Bayangol	48,954	52.61%	30,249	32.51%	8,361	8.99%
Songino Khairkhan	79,244	67.34%	26,692	22.68%	4,742	4.03%
Overseas	1,175	21.10%	4,084	73.35%	160	2.87%
Total	823,326	67.76%	246,968	20.33%	72,832	5.99%

=== 2024 parliamentary election ===
Preliminary results showed the ruling Mongolia People's Party had won a narrow and reduced majority in the Khural, which allowed Prime Minister Luvsannamsrain Oyun-Erdene to publicly claim victory. The Democratic Party also gained 42 seats, an increase from the 2020 election. The full official results were presented by the GEC on 1 July 2024.

Party	Proportional			Constituency			Total seats	+/–
Party	Votes	%	Seats	Votes	%	Seats	Total seats	+/–
Mongolian People's Party	509,482	35.01	18	3,619,950	38.64	50	68	+6
Democratic Party	438,506	30.13	16	3,135,988	33.48	26	42	+31
HUN Party	151,111	10.38	6	636,648	6.80	2	8	+7
National Coalition	75,196	5.17	4	291,166	3.11	0	4	New
Civil Will–Green Party	73,006	5.02	4	269,582	2.88	0	4	+4
New United Coalition	69,682	4.79	0	255,847	2.73	0	0	New
Truth and Right Party	40,783	2.80	0	208,717	2.23	0	0	New
Civil Movement Party	20,443	1.40	0	153,615	1.64	0	0	New
Republican Party	19,635	1.35	0	116,561	1.24	0	0	New
The Civic Unity Party	13,733	0.94	0	86,083	0.92	0	0	New
People's Power Party	10,614	0.73	0	106,423	1.14	0	0	New
Good Democratic Citizens United Party	6,104	0.42	0	59,902	0.64	0	0	New
Motherland Party	5,621	0.39	0	52,803	0.56	0	0	New
Liberte Party	4,738	0.33	0	45,794	0.49	0	0	New
People's Majority Governance Party	3,619	0.25	0	31,025	0.33	0	0	0
For the Mongolian People Party	3,461	0.24	0	35,183	0.38	0	0	New
Mongolian Liberal Democratic Party	2,820	0.19	0	232	0.00	0	0	New
United Patriots Party	2,168	0.15	0	213	0.00	0	0	0
Mongolian Social Democratic Party	1,531	0.11	0	7,789	0.08	0	0	0
Mongol Conservative Party	1,485	0.10	0	21,177	0.23	0	0	New
Freedom Implementing Party	1,450	0.10	0	26,192	0.28	0	0	0
Independent				206,916	2.21	0	0	–1
Total	1,455,188	100.00	48	9,367,806	100.00	78	126	+50
Valid votes	1,455,188	99.47		1,441,825	99.33			
Invalid/blank votes	7,717	0.53		9,728	0.67			
Total votes	1,462,905	100.00		1,451,553	100.00			
Registered voters/turnout	2,094,733	69.84		2,097,961	69.19			
Source: General Election Commission

=== Results by constituency ===
Results by constituency

1st Constituency
Candidate	Party	Votes	%
Oyuunsaikhany Altangerel	Democratic Party	66,656	5.80
Sainkhüügiin Ganbaatar	Democratic Party	61,824	5.38
Batmönkhiin Battsetseg	Mongolian People's Party	60,610	5.27
Pürevbaataryn Mönkhtulga	Democratic Party	60,059	5.23
Dashdondogiin Ganbat	Democratic Party	58,263	5.07
Ganzorigiin Temüülen	Mongolian People's Party	58,228	5.07
Ganbatyn Khosbayar	Democratic Party	56,612	4.93
Damdinsürengiin Jargalsaikhan	Democratic Party	56,177	4.89
Davaagiin Tsogtbaatar	Democratic Party	55,935	4.87
Gombojavyn Zandanshatar	Mongolian People's Party	53,649	4.67
Amgalangiin Ad'yaasüren	Democratic Party	53,485	4.65
Dulamdorjiin Togtokhsüren	Mongolian People's Party	51,867	4.51
Batsuuriin Davaadalai	Mongolian People's Party	51,686	4.50
Sodnomyn Chinzorig	Mongolian People's Party	51,248	4.46
Enebishiin Bolorchuluun	Democratic Party	50,935	4.43
Gürsediin Saikhanbayar	Mongolian People's Party	49,296	4.29
Gochoogiin Ganbold	Mongolian People's Party	48,964	4.26
Ayuushiin Tsogtsetseg	Mongolian People's Party	48,661	4.23
Ayuurzanyn Otgonbaatar	Truth and Right Party	23,876	2.08
Tserendorjiin Dagvadorj	National Coalition	10,025	0.87
Otgonbaataryn Bilgüün	HUN Party	9,724	0.85
Tsolmongiin Mönkhbat	Independent	7,955	0.69
Erdene-Ochiryn Sodnomjamts	National Coalition	7,760	0.68
Sharav-Arildiigiin Mönkhbaatar	Truth and Right Party	4,493	0.39
Rentsendorjiin Oyuunbileg	National Coalition	3,966	0.35
Dagdangiin Odontungalag	National Coalition	3,726	0.32
Mönkhtogtokhyn Galmönkh	Truth and Right Party	3,609	0.31
Batsürengiin Urangoo	HUN Party	3,290	0.29
Perenlein Tamir	HUN Party	3,033	0.26
Gombodorjiin Enkh-Amgalan	Civil Movement Party	2,943	0.26
Ünenbuyangiin Gantig	HUN Party	2,770	0.24
Byambaakhüügiin Oyuunbileg	Truth and Right Party	2,726	0.24
Tömör-Ochiryn Mönkhnasan	New United Coalition	2,721	0.24
Dashkhüügiin Batmandakh	HUN Party	2,519	0.22
Baasansambuugiin Chinbaatar	New United Coalition	2,474	0.22
Jambalsürengiin Batzangia	Truth and Right Party	2,447	0.21
Tömör-Ochiryn Bulganmaa	HUN Party	2,403	0.21
Gankhuyagiin Odontsetseg	Truth and Right Party	2,305	0.20
Enkhbaataryn Mönkhtulga	Motherland Party	2,249	0.20
Nergüin Tüvshinmönkh	Civil Movement Party	2,123	0.18
Sosorbaramyn Ganbold	Civil Will–Green Party	2,062	0.18
Dolgorsürengiin Erdenebat	Truth and Right Party	2,002	0.17
Byambaagiin Buyanjargal	Civil Movement Party	1,990	0.17
Sükhbaataryn Bütemj	Civil Movement Party	1,896	0.16
Pürevragchaagiin Battulga	Civil Movement Party	1,854	0.16
Erdenebatyn Gan-Erdene	Civil Will–Green Party	1,839	0.16
Gend-Ochiryn Khayankhyarvaa	Civil Movement Party	1,798	0.16
Chagnaadorjiin Pürevsüren	Truth and Right Party	1,783	0.16
Chuluuntsetsegiin Gereltuyaa	Truth and Right Party	1,769	0.15
Ganbaataryn Bütemj	HUN Party	1,725	0.15
Chogsomyn Mönkh-Amgalan	HUN Party	1,693	0.15
Ölziipüreviin Shinekhüü	Civil Movement Party	1,672	0.15
Sosoryn Enkhbat	Civil Will–Green Party	1,641	0.14
Enkhtöriin Pagamjam	Civil Will–Green Party	1,590	0.14
Tsanjidyn Baldandorj	New United Coalition	1,522	0.13
Üdelmaagiin Erdenechimeg	Civil Will–Green Party	1,473	0.13
Ganpüreviin Dolgormaa	HUN Party	1,352	0.12
Dashzevegiin Bayarmaa	Civil Will–Green Party	1,238	0.11
Zinamideriin Bat-Erdene	People's Majority Rule Party	1,114	0.10
Batchuluuny Uranchimeg	People's Power Party	990	0.09
Bat-Ayuushiin Dugarmaa	Civil Will–Green Party	963	0.08
Nyam-Ochiryn Nasanbaatar	Motherland Party	935	0.08
Gombosürengiin Düürenbileg	Republican Party	933	0.08
Davaabayaryn Nyambayar	Motherland Party	911	0.08
Tüvshintöriin Tüvshinjargal	Citizen Participation Union Party	905	0.08
Erdenebatyn Enkhbat	For the Mongolian People Party	862	0.07
Myagmardorjiin Batmönkh	Republican Party	824	0.07
Dembereldalain Tsegmed	Mongolian Conservative Party	718	0.06
Myagmarpüreviin Osorjamaa	Citizen Participation Union Party	713	0.06
Dashbazaryn Otgontsetseg	Freedom Alliance Party	705	0.06
Batmönkhiin Oyuun-Erdene	For the Mongolian People Party	635	0.06
Üüriintuyaagiin Amarjargal	People's Power Party	584	0.05
Davkharbayaryn Khurtsbaatar	Freedom Alliance Party	566	0.05
Shinedentseliin Altansükh	For the Mongolian People Party	477	0.04
Mijiddorjiin Battulga	Good Democratic Citizens United Party	460	0.04
Batbayaryn Ankhbayar	Freedom Alliance Party	456	0.04
Banzaryn Javzmaa	Good Democratic Citizens United Party	415	0.04
Pürevjambyn Sanchir	Citizen Participation Union Party	373	0.03
Avirmediin Üürtsaikh	Good Democratic Citizens United Party	326	0.03
Tserenbaljiryn Erdenebaatar	Good Democratic Citizens United Party	280	0.02
Total		1,149,336	100.00
Valid votes		127,163	99.46
Invalid/blank votes		687	0.54
Total votes		127,850	100.00
Registered voters/turnout		187,668	68.13

2nd Constituency
Candidate	Party	Votes	%
Sandagiin Byambatsogt	Mongolian People's Party	79,826	5.66
Odongiin Tsogtgerel	Democratic Party	75,927	5.38
Dashzegviin Amarbayasgalan	Mongolian People's Party	74,199	5.26
Bökhchuluuny Pürevdorj	Democratic Party	74,152	5.26
Battogtokhyn Choijilsüren	Mongolian People's Party	73,280	5.20
Banzragchiin Tüvshin	Democratic Party	69,829	4.95
Ochirbatyn Amgalanbaatar	Democratic Party	67,597	4.79
Batjargalyn Zayaabal	Mongolian People's Party	67,321	4.77
Zagdjavyn Mendsaikhan	Mongolian People's Party	66,594	4.72
Enkhbatyn Bolormaa	Mongolian People's Party	64,838	4.60
Tsedendambyn Tserenpuntsag	Mongolian People's Party	64,537	4.58
Zagdkhüügiin Narantuyaa	Democratic Party	59,284	4.20
Shirnenbanidyn Adishaa	Democratic Party	58,823	4.17
Baljinnyamyn Bayarsaikhan	Mongolian People's Party	58,788	4.17
Chimediin Khürelbaatar	Mongolian People's Party	56,388	4.00
Sereejavyn Enkhbold	Mongolian People's Party	55,107	3.91
Tsogtoogiin Odontungalag	Democratic Party	51,204	3.63
Daimaagiin Batsaikhan	Democratic Party	50,612	3.59
Dogsomyn Battsogt	Democratic Party	50,096	3.55
Norovyn Tegshbayar	Democratic Party	38,629	2.74
Samandyn Javkhlan	Republican Party	18,883	1.34
Ad'yaabaljiryn Sanjmyatav	Independent	6,071	0.43
Dorjiin Önörjargal	HUN Party	5,568	0.39
Khiimorsangiin Bolor-Erdene	HUN Party	5,109	0.36
Khumbagaryn Batmend	New United Coalition	4,357	0.31
Tseren-Ochiryn Batdorj	National Coalition	4,325	0.31
Ganbatyn Bayarmaa	HUN Party	4,153	0.29
Damdiny Buyanbal	HUN Party	3,892	0.28
Nyamaagiin Tseveen	National Coalition	3,374	0.24
Ganboldyn Bayartogtokh	Civil Will–Green Party	3,322	0.24
Jarantain Amartaivan	New United Coalition	2,822	0.20
Sorogiin Soyombo	HUN Party	2,737	0.19
Doljingiin Otgonbayar	Civil Will–Green Party	2,594	0.18
Battulgyn Enkhzayaa	HUN Party	2,447	0.17
Altangereliin Dorjdagva	Truth and Right Party	2,445	0.17
Davaatserengiin Avirmed	National Coalition	2,443	0.17
Baljinnyamyn Amaraa	HUN Party	2,282	0.16
Khadbaataryn Naranzayaa	Civil Will–Green Party	2,196	0.16
Ochirbatyn Altansükh	Civil Movement Party	2,042	0.14
Gantulgyn Khiimorisan	Independent	1,957	0.14
Jambaldorjiin Otgonbayar	New United Coalition	1,916	0.14
Chimidiin Mönkhjargal	New United Coalition	1,825	0.13
Dashravdangiin Altansükh	Civil Movement Party	1,802	0.13
Tüvshindüürenbayaryn Tsolmonsaikhan	New United Coalition	1,795	0.13
Dorjpalamyn Mönkhbayar	Independent	1,765	0.13
Tsogoogiin Möngöntulga	Civil Will–Green Party	1,722	0.12
Baryn Batsuuri	Civil Will–Green Party	1,674	0.12
Magsarjavyn Byambadorj	Republican Party	1,624	0.12
Batnasangiin Battogtokh	Truth and Right Party	1,597	0.11
Batsaikhany Khash-Erdene	HUN Party	1,531	0.11
Chimeddorjiin Yerööltüvshin	People's Majority Rule Party	1,512	0.11
Narantsetsegiin Davaanyam	National Coalition	1,494	0.11
Gankhuyagiin Budnyam	Truth and Right Party	1,465	0.10
Namjiljavyn Sandag	Civil Movement Party	1,461	0.10
Myangandashiin Byambadorj	HUN Party	1,461	0.10
Tsengeliin Bat-Erdene	Independent	1,459	0.10
Batsaikhany Mönkhtsetseg	Freedom Implementing Party	1,454	0.10
Tulgaagiin Galbadrakh	Republican Party	1,432	0.10
Oyuunbaataryn Nyamdorj	Truth and Right Party	1,427	0.10
Davaanyamyn Batzorigt	Civil Movement Party	1,372	0.10
Choijilsürengiin Bat-Erdene	Republican Party	1,303	0.09
Jamsrangiin Tserenchimed	Civil Movement Party	1,218	0.09
Erdenebaataryn Ganbold	Civil Movement Party	1,148	0.08
Dorjiin Chingeel Baatar	Civil Movement Party	1,121	0.08
Jamsranjavyn Mönkhbayar	Motherland Party	1,088	0.08
Shartolgoin Odkhüü	Civil Movement Party	1,067	0.08
Darisürengiin Tsogjargal	Motherland Party	1,049	0.07
Gantulgyn Enkhbayar	Independent	1,031	0.07
Tserenpiliin Odgerel	Civil Movement Party	1,004	0.07
Gombosürengiin Sarantuyaa	Truth and Right Party	991	0.07
Lkhagvajavyn Ganzorig	Independent	989	0.07
Ganboldyn Pürevragchaa	Independent	942	0.07
Ganbaataryn Namjilmaa	Truth and Right Party	902	0.06
Buyanjargalyn Lkhagvasüren	Independent	895	0.06
Batmönkhiin Tögsbayar	Freedom Implementing Party	890	0.06
Bayarsaikhany Pürevsüren	Truth and Right Party	888	0.06
Pürveegiin Ganbold	Independent	879	0.06
Tömöriin Batsükh	Truth and Right Party	826	0.06
Batkholboogiin Nyamdolgor	Citizen Participation Union Party	825	0.06
Tulgaagiin Ariuntungalag	Good Democratic Citizens United Party	818	0.06
Sharavyn Erdenetsetseg	People's Power Party	817	0.06
Tsedendambyn Batlkhagva	Civil Will–Green Party	781	0.06
Banzragchiin Byambadorj	Civil Movement Party	774	0.05
Enkh-Amgalangiin Baljinnyam	Freedom Alliance Party	727	0.05
Choijiljavyn Binder'yaa	Truth and Right Party	721	0.05
Jamsranchimediin Batsaikhan	Independent	704	0.05
Ideshiin Tungalagtuyaa	For the Mongolian People Party	699	0.05
Garmaagiin Erdenebat	People's Power Party	684	0.05
Dügersürengiin Enkhbayar	Independent	683	0.05
Battömöriin Batbayar	Independent	670	0.05
Dorjiin Möngöntsetseg	Good Democratic Citizens United Party	661	0.05
Naranbaataryn Choijildagva	Motherland Party	655	0.05
Badamdorjiin Baasankhüü	Independent	643	0.05
Baasandorjiin Bileg	Freedom Implementing Party	638	0.05
Lkhagvasürengiin Tömörsükh	Citizen Participation Union Party	626	0.04
Vanchigiin Tömörbaatar	Mongolian Conservative Party	604	0.04
Zambyn Batmönkh	Independent	580	0.04
Tulgaagiin Ankhbayar	Freedom Alliance Party	576	0.04
Ganjuuryn Mönkhtsetseg	Citizen Participation Union Party	554	0.04
Mandakhyn Enkhmörön	Freedom Alliance Party	505	0.04
Dalantain Bayanjargal	Truth and Right Party	501	0.04
Sanjmyatavyn Saruul-Erdene	People's Majority Rule Party	454	0.03
Sengesambyn Mönkh-Ochir	Citizen Participation Union Party	453	0.03
Yadamdorjiin Bat-Erdene	People's Majority Rule Party	451	0.03
Zandangiin Enkh-Orgil	Freedom Alliance Party	443	0.03
Tsesmaagiin Ganbat	Good Democratic Citizens United Party	423	0.03
Bayarsaikhany Anundari	Good Democratic Citizens United Party	418	0.03
Nyalkhain Oyuundalai	Citizen Participation Union Party	409	0.03
Khuvkhüü Dobkhardtyn Tümenkhishig	Mongolian Conservative Party	364	0.03
Ishdorjiin Davaadulam	For the Mongolian People Party	356	0.03
Batnasangiin Mönkh-Altai	Good Democratic Citizens United Party	351	0.02
Myagmaryn Nyamgerel	Good Democratic Citizens United Party	350	0.02
Javjingiin Nyamdorj	People's Majority Rule Party	272	0.02
Bazarjavyn Davaadorj	Good Democratic Citizens United Party	201	0.01
Total		1,410,460	100.00
Valid votes		140,704	99.71
Invalid/blank votes		403	0.29
Total votes		141,107	100.00
Registered voters/turnout		192,200	73.42

3rd Constituency
Candidate	Party	Votes	%
Khajyekbyeriin Jangabyl	Mongolian People's Party	25,138	18.14
Tilyeukhany Aubakir	Mongolian People's Party	23,772	17.15
Bulany Byeisyen	Democratic Party	21,454	15.48
Sharivyn Jandos	Democratic Party	18,160	13.10
Khuzkyeigiin Darmyen	Democratic Party	17,518	12.64
Zulpain Batyrbyek	Mongolian People's Party	16,986	12.26
Dalyeliin Bauyrjan	Independent	8,880	6.41
Birdkhany Mukhit	HUN Party	1,161	0.84
Battulgyn Enkh-Uyanga	Truth and Right Party	1,154	0.83
Kabiliin Yerjan	National Coalition	1,036	0.75
Tsonkhiogiin Tsolmon	HUN Party	665	0.48
Tursyny Güljan	Civil Will–Green Party	362	0.26
Khalimjany Bagdat	Civil Will–Green Party	317	0.23
Nasiryn Samat	New United Coalition	317	0.23
Zakhany Daulyetbyek	New United Coalition	285	0.21
Khajymuratyn Nurgül	Civil Will–Green Party	245	0.18
Natsagdorjiin Enkhbaatar	Civil Movement Party	240	0.17
Batdelgeriin Zagdzüsem	Civil Movement Party	231	0.17
Boldbaataryn Naranbadral	Civil Movement Party	225	0.16
Marjany Bolat	HUN Party	133	0.10
Pürevjavyn Erdenetsogt	Good Democratic Citizens United Party	114	0.08
Mavlyetyn Tölyegyen	Republican Party	110	0.08
Shökyeshiin Asylbyek	Freedom Alliance Party	79	0.06
Total		138,582	100.00
Valid votes		46,080	99.63
Invalid/blank votes		171	0.37
Total votes		46,251	100.00
Registered voters/turnout		62,896	73.54

4th Constituency
Candidate	Party	Votes	%
Khaltmaagiin Battulga	Democratic Party	60,933	5.92
Luvsantserengiin Enkh-Amgalan	Mongolian People's Party	59,728	5.80
Dambyn Batlut	Mongolian People's Party	58,657	5.70
Bat-Ölziin Bat-Erdene	Mongolian People's Party	53,474	5.20
Dorjsürengiin Üüriintuyaa	Mongolian People's Party	51,805	5.03
Lkhagvyn Mönkhbaatar	Mongolian People's Party	49,182	4.78
Jadambyn Bat-Erdene	Mongolian People's Party	48,198	4.68
Tserenpiliin Davaasüren	Mongolian People's Party	47,557	4.62
Batbayaryn Ariun-Erdene	Democratic Party	43,885	4.26
Lamjavyn Gündalai	People's Power Party	42,919	4.17
Jalbasürengiin Batzandan	Democratic Party	42,683	4.15
Günshiriin Möngönkhuyag	Democratic Party	40,183	3.90
Khaichaagiin Batsaikhan	Democratic Party	40,162	3.90
Batsükhiin Bayarmagnai	Mongolian People's Party	39,800	3.87
Dorligiin Ösökhbayar	Democratic Party	38,449	3.74
Khash-Erdeniin Erdenebaatar	Democratic Party	37,132	3.61
Gungaajavyn Tserendolgor	Democratic Party	33,045	3.21
Erdenebilegiin Batkhishig	New United Coalition	12,066	1.17
Batchuluuny Mönkhnasan	Independent	11,046	1.07
Batmönkhiin Mönkhbold	HUN Party	9,402	0.91
Dashdavaagiin Ganbold	National Coalition	9,007	0.88
Bayaraagiin Zundui	HUN Party	8,669	0.84
Shinebayaryn Zulbadam	Independent	8,531	0.83
Enkh-Amgalangiin Sarantsetseg	National Coalition	8,026	0.78
Ganzorigiin Gankhuyag	New United Coalition	7,671	0.75
Tömörbaataryn Ochirdari	HUN Party	7,284	0.71
Bavuugiin Chinzorig	National Coalition	7,070	0.69
Ganbaataryn Batbaatar	Truth and Right Party	6,627	0.64
Erdenetögsiin Enkhchimeg	HUN Party	6,074	0.59
Munadembereliin Sambuunyam	People's Power Party	5,542	0.54
Biraagiin Bat-Erdene	Civil Will–Green Party	5,447	0.53
Mashiny Elbegzayaa	HUN Party	5,317	0.52
Tsogtyn Bataa	Independent	4,726	0.46
Tsagaantsoojiin Enkhbat	HUN Party	4,571	0.44
Erdenebayaryn Tungalag	HUN Party	4,477	0.44
Battulgyn Bolormaa	Truth and Right Party	4,381	0.43
Dashtserengiin Nominzayaa	People's Power Party	4,308	0.42
Dashnyamyn Batbayar	Independent	4,228	0.41
Gürjavyn Batpürev	Civil Movement Party	4,163	0.40
Bayarsaikhany Byambajav	People's Power Party	4,027	0.39
Dashbaldangiin Batbayar	New United Coalition	4,007	0.39
Batkhüügiin Batjargal	People's Power Party	3,763	0.37
Dorjiin Amartüvshin	People's Power Party	3,718	0.36
Bat-Erdeniin Ariunzayaa	People's Power Party	3,706	0.36
Balsanjavyn Batbileg	Civil Will–Green Party	3,653	0.35
Badarchiin Erdenebat	Motherland Party	3,495	0.34
Tümenbayaryn Saruultungalag	New United Coalition	3,269	0.32
Ayuulgüin Ariunbold	New United Coalition	3,240	0.31
Baldandorjiin Bat-Uul	Civil Movement Party	3,092	0.30
Nyamsürengiin Khandsüren	Civil Will–Green Party	2,953	0.29
Otgondorjiin Sanjaasüren	Truth and Right Party	2,953	0.29
Gonchigsürengiin Enkhbayar	Republican Party	2,525	0.25
Jam'yandorjiin Zolzayaa	Truth and Right Party	2,513	0.24
Püreviin Ganbat	Civil Movement Party	2,482	0.24
Namnansürengiin Serjmyatav	Civil Movement Party	2,290	0.22
Davaajavyn Batchimeg	Citizen Participation Union Party	2,143	0.21
Davaasürengiin Tsogt-Erdene	Civil Movement Party	2,117	0.21
Jamsrangiin Ider	New United Coalition	2,008	0.20
Tömörbaataryn Amraa	Civil Will–Green Party	1,939	0.19
Puntsagdorjiin Damdindorj	Civil Movement Party	1,910	0.19
Tömör-Ochiryn Ganbat	Motherland Party	1,859	0.18
Bataagiin Gantulga	Freedom Implementing Party	1,838	0.18
Setenjavyn Ürelpürev	New United Coalition	1,794	0.17
Gombosürengiin Bayanjargal	Civil Movement Party	1,790	0.17
Chogsomjavyn Enkhbold	Civil Movement Party	1,758	0.17
Tserenbatyn Jimbeegalsan	People's Power Party	1,661	0.16
Tsetsgeegiin Odonchimeg	Good Democratic Citizens United Party	1,625	0.16
Erdenebilegiin Oyuun-Erdene	Freedom Alliance Party	1,528	0.15
Davaajavyn Ölzii-Orshikh	Citizen Participation Union Party	1,399	0.14
Lkhagvyn Saranchimeg	Citizen Participation Union Party	1,281	0.12
Dagvajamtsyn Sarantuyaa	Good Democratic Citizens United Party	1,235	0.12
Rentsendorjiin Galbadrakh	For the Mongolian People Party	1,124	0.11
Byambajavyn Sükhbold	For the Mongolian People Party	1,107	0.11
Tömörbaataryn Oyuunbolor	Freedom Alliance Party	1,055	0.10
Tömöriin Erdenetsetseg	Mongolian Conservative Party	1,028	0.10
Chimiddorjiin Chimid-Ochir	Motherland Party	923	0.09
Batmönkhiin Ayuush	Citizen Participation Union Party	844	0.08
Amgalangiin Batbileg	People's Majority Rule Party	797	0.08
Giragiin Niislelkhüü	People's Majority Rule Party	796	0.08
Delgeriin Narmandakh	For the Mongolian People Party	777	0.08
Iderbatyn Biligsaikhan	Freedom Alliance Party	754	0.07
Luvsanjambaagiin Mönkhtör	Mongolian Conservative Party	745	0.07
Baldangiin Bayasgalan	Mongolian Conservative Party	675	0.07
Galbadrakhyn Altanshagai	Citizen Participation Union Party	663	0.06
Khurmashiin Baasansüren	Citizen Participation Union Party	661	0.06
Sanjaasürengiin Pürevsüren	Good Democratic Citizens United Party	562	0.05
Ganshiremiin Nordod	People's Majority Rule Party	525	0.05
Total		1,029,032	100.00
Valid votes		128,125	99.52
Invalid/blank votes		619	0.48
Total votes		128,744	100.00
Registered voters/turnout		193,183	66.64

5th Constituency
Candidate	Party	Votes	%
Boldyn Javkhlan	Mongolian People's Party	62,898	4.89
Tsevegdorjiin Tuvaan	Democratic Party	60,644	4.72
Dalain Batbayar	Democratic Party	53,903	4.19
Jadambyn Enkhbayar	Mongolian People's Party	53,306	4.15
Buyaagiin Tulga	Mongolian People's Party	50,017	3.89
Gongoryn Damdinnyam	Mongolian People's Party	49,307	3.84
Sükhbaataryn Erdenebold	Democratic Party	47,892	3.73
Sürenjavyn Lündeg	Mongolian People's Party	46,712	3.64
Chinbatyn Undram	Mongolian People's Party	44,925	3.50
Jigjidiin Batjargal	Mongolian People's Party	44,775	3.48
Batchuluuny Tsogtgerel	Mongolian People's Party	43,223	3.36
Nemekheegiin Odongua	Democratic Party	40,617	3.16
Dondogdorjiin Erdenebat	Democratic Party	40,270	3.13
Dombongiin Üüriintuyaa	Democratic Party	39,908	3.11
Deremiin Erdenesuvd	Democratic Party	39,687	3.09
Natsagdorjiin Lkhagvadorj	Mongolian People's Party	39,643	3.09
Damdinsürengiin Önörbolor	Mongolian People's Party	39,394	3.07
Dulamsürengiin Dorjpürev	Democratic Party	37,281	2.90
Radnaagiin Batjargal	Democratic Party	36,584	2.85
Lkhasürengiin Odbayar	Democratic Party	33,937	2.64
Magsarjavyn Ochirbat	HUN Party	15,209	1.18
Khashbaataryn Tsagaanbaatar	Civil Will–Green Party	14,639	1.14
Lkhagvasürengiin Bayartulga	National Coalition	12,323	0.96
Pürevdorjiin Erdenebat	New United Coalition	12,226	0.95
Ganbürgediin Gantuyaa	HUN Party	12,000	0.93
Gongoryn Otgontuyaa	HUN Party	10,351	0.81
Chuluunbatyn Tsog-Erdene	HUN Party	10,294	0.80
Otgonkhüügiin Bolor-Erdene	National Coalition	10,016	0.78
Monkhoryn Törtogtokh	Independent	9,559	0.74
Dagvadorjiin Gantuul	Independent	9,497	0.74
Batsaikhany Nyambayar	Truth and Right Party	9,316	0.72
Shoovdoryn Barkhasbadi	HUN Party	8,366	0.65
Lkhagvyn Jambaa	HUN Party	7,483	0.58
Agvaansamdangiin Batsükh	New United Coalition	7,384	0.57
Davaagiin Bayasgalan	New United Coalition	6,790	0.53
Lkhagvaagiin Oyuunchimeg	New United Coalition	6,461	0.50
Janyn Ganbaatar	Independent	6,389	0.50
Luvsangiin Ganbold	Independent	6,376	0.50
Donoloin Badamkhand	HUN Party	6,289	0.49
Dashpuntsagiin Khishigjargal	National Coalition	6,214	0.48
Baataryn Undrakh-Od	National Coalition	5,991	0.47
Lkhasürengiin Choi-Ish	National Coalition	5,948	0.46
Baastyn Erdenebolor	National Coalition	5,833	0.45
Baldangiin Ganbaatar	Civil Will–Green Party	5,683	0.44
Pürevtserengiin Undram	HUN Party	5,474	0.43
Oidovyn Tsetsegmaa	Truth and Right Party	5,407	0.42
Tovuudorjiin Nasanjargal	National Coalition	5,401	0.42
Saranbaataryn Atartsetseg	Civil Will–Green Party	5,088	0.40
Sharavyn Batkhishig	Civil Will–Green Party	4,858	0.38
Mergenbilegiin Soyol	HUN Party	4,737	0.37
Ünenbürengiin Myagmarjav	Civil Movement Party	4,621	0.36
Shaizadagiin Galam	HUN Party	4,602	0.36
Khaltaryn Boldmandal	National Coalition	4,013	0.31
Batboldyn Byambabaatar	Truth and Right Party	3,929	0.31
Rinchindorjiin Ariunsanaa	Civil Will–Green Party	3,775	0.29
Ochirbatyn Nergüi	Civil Will–Green Party	3,545	0.28
Batsaikhany Chinbat	Truth and Right Party	3,520	0.27
Tsend-Ayuushiin Mönkhjargal	Civil Will–Green Party	3,504	0.27
Tsedeviin Ölziitogtokh	Civil Movement Party	3,486	0.27
Ninagiin Soronzonbayar	Republican Party	3,445	0.27
Manakhüügiin Ganbat	Civil Movement Party	3,399	0.26
Sükhbaataryn Batbayar	Motherland Party	3,340	0.26
Lamkhüügiin Naranchimeg	Republican Party	3,298	0.26
Batsaikhany Odgerel	Truth and Right Party	3,296	0.26
Urtnasangiin Baatarkhuyag	Civil Will–Green Party	3,244	0.25
Bayanmönkhiin Baljinnyam	Motherland Party	3,223	0.25
Janchivyn Tsendsüren	Civil Movement Party	3,098	0.24
Soronzonboldyn Bolorchuluun	Civil Movement Party	3,032	0.24
Batbayaryn Davaajargal	Citizen Participation Union Party	2,934	0.23
Chimeddorjiin Erdenebat	Civil Movement Party	2,912	0.23
Balchindorjiin Enkhsaikhan	Mongolian Conservative Party	2,660	0.21
Badralyn Khorolgarav	Truth and Right Party	2,654	0.21
Radnaagiin Ulambadrakh	Civil Movement Party	2,605	0.20
Choijingiin Ganchimeg	Motherland Party	2,375	0.18
Gochoogiin Natsagdorj	Civil Movement Party	2,361	0.18
Mönkhbayaryn Amarsanaa	For the Mongolian People Party	2,234	0.17
Sandagdorjiin Soyolbaatar	Civil Movement Party	2,224	0.17
Dorjiin Damdinsüren	Freedom Implementing Party	2,016	0.16
Batboldyn Telmüün	Good Democratic Citizens United Party	1,969	0.15
Batkhüügiin Bayarchimeg	People's Power Party	1,968	0.15
Namdagiin Naranbaatar	Citizen Participation Union Party	1,915	0.15
Tsedendambyn Enkhsaikhan	Civil Movement Party	1,903	0.15
Ochirbatyn Itgelsüren	Freedom Alliance Party	1,857	0.14
Batzorigiin Uuganbayar	Freedom Alliance Party	1,844	0.14
Dembereliin Bayaraa	Motherland Party	1,807	0.14
Altankhuyagiin Möngönshagai	Motherland Party	1,778	0.14
Batkhuyagiin Anar	People's Power Party	1,773	0.14
Dulmaagiin Uuganbayar	Citizen Participation Union Party	1,713	0.13
Gantömöriin Tungalag	Citizen Participation Union Party	1,639	0.13
Banzragchiin Ganbold	Freedom Implementing Party	1,625	0.13
Darkhanbayaryn Amartüvshin	Freedom Implementing Party	1,531	0.12
Tsedengiin Enkhtuyaa	Good Democratic Citizens United Party	1,478	0.12
Bayandalain Mönkhtenger	People's Power Party	1,350	0.11
Püreviin Bold	People's Majority Rule Party	1,332	0.10
Gankhuyagiin Sarantsetseg	People's Majority Rule Party	1,242	0.10
Möngönzagasyn Erdenebat	Good Democratic Citizens United Party	1,195	0.09
Tsogtbayaryn Tungalagbolor	People's Power Party	1,180	0.09
Bayarsaikhany Tsengünjav	Freedom Alliance Party	1,102	0.09
Batchuluuny Bars	People's Power Party	1,091	0.08
Dulmaagiin Ariuntuyaa	For the Mongolian People Party	1,071	0.08
Bazargüriin Ariunbold	Good Democratic Citizens United Party	1,044	0.08
Nyamaabazaryn Mönkhtuyaa	People's Power Party	1,009	0.08
Vanchingiin Narantsetseg	For the Mongolian People Party	989	0.08
Chuluuny Iderbaatar	Freedom Implementing Party	958	0.07
Namsrain Erdenestsatsral	Citizen Participation Union Party	927	0.07
Mönkhtömöriin Ariunzayaa	People's Power Party	913	0.07
Battömöriin Baigalimaa	For the Mongolian People Party	907	0.07
Zorigtyn Batüd	Citizen Participation Union Party	900	0.07
Sükhbaataryn Javzandulam	Freedom Implementing Party	840	0.07
Enebishiin Ölziisaruul	For the Mongolian People Party	804	0.06
Pürevdalain Enkh-Amgalan	People's Majority Rule Party	787	0.06
Volodyagiin Badamkhand	People's Majority Rule Party	758	0.06
Bayartsaikhany Byambagerel	Citizen Participation Union Party	753	0.06
Bürengiin Delgerekh	For the Mongolian People Party	657	0.05
Dondogiin Dariimaa	People's Power Party	628	0.05
Denzengiin Chuluunchimeg	People's Majority Rule Party	627	0.05
Tsedengiin Sergelentuyaa	For the Mongolian People Party	493	0.04
Lkhagvadorjiin Byaraabazar	People's Power Party	412	0.03
Tsogtoogiin Tserendolgor	For the Mongolian People Party	351	0.03
Total		1,284,990	100.00
Valid votes		127,950	99.44
Invalid/blank votes		724	0.56
Total votes		128,674	100.00
Registered voters/turnout		193,635	66.45

6th Constituency
Candidate	Party	Votes	%
Luvsannamsrain Oyun-Erdene	Mongolian People's Party	55,469	8.06
Myagmarsürengiin Badamsüren	Mongolian People's Party	46,667	6.78
Tsagaankhüügiin Iderbat	Mongolian People's Party	45,777	6.65
Ukhnaagiin Otgonbayar	Mongolian People's Party	43,724	6.35
Lkhagvasürengiin Soronzonbold	Mongolian People's Party	43,400	6.30
Shinebayaryn Byambasüren	Democratic Party	43,047	6.25
Möngöntsogiin Gankhüleg	Mongolian People's Party	42,248	6.14
Erkhembaataryn Tömörbaatar	Democratic Party	41,601	6.04
Pürev-Ochiryn Anujin	Mongolian People's Party	40,443	5.87
Törmönkhiin Pürevkhatan	Democratic Party	38,915	5.65
Nayantain Ganibal	Democratic Party	37,630	5.47
Sükhbaataryn Tömörkhüü	Democratic Party	36,239	5.26
Demberelvaanchigiin Baldan	Democratic Party	28,408	4.13
Shagdaryn Batdelger	Democratic Party	27,090	3.94
Lkhamjavyn Batjav	Independent	23,562	3.42
Pürevgereliin Gerelbaatar	Independent	8,883	1.29
Chuluuny Erdenebat	National Coalition	7,831	1.14
Enkhjargalyn Undarmaa	National Coalition	6,223	0.90
Galsandorjiin Solongo	Truth and Right Party	6,080	0.88
Erdenebaataryn Zayagegee	National Coalition	4,053	0.59
Damdinsürengiin Enkhbayar	HUN Party	3,727	0.54
Törboldyn Bat-Orgil	National Coalition	3,230	0.47
Lkhagvyn Lkhagvasüren	HUN Party	2,624	0.38
Enkhtöriin Pürevsüren	Civil Will–Green Party	2,454	0.36
Arslanbaataryn Arvinjargal	HUN Party	2,356	0.34
Ochirsükhiin Odjargal	Independent	2,276	0.33
Delgermaagiin Solongo	Motherland Party	2,071	0.30
Sharavdorjiin Byambatogtokh	National Coalition	1,992	0.29
Tsedevdorjiin Choijamts	Independent	1,959	0.28
Dolgoryn Bayarbileg	HUN Party	1,781	0.26
Tömör-Ochiryn Chinbat	Civil Will–Green Party	1,678	0.24
Ryenchindorjiin Enkhtuyaa	HUN Party	1,620	0.24
Magsaryn Ariunbat	New United Coalition	1,543	0.22
Galsandorjiin Bulgan	Truth and Right Party	1,456	0.21
Mönkhjargalyn Buyanzayaa	HUN Party	1,447	0.21
Dashjamtsyn Badrakh	New United Coalition	1,353	0.20
Kholkhoryn Oyuunchimeg	Civil Movement Party	1,248	0.18
Myagmarpüreviin Önörbileg	Truth and Right Party	1,178	0.17
Damdinsürengiin Daramdorj	Civil Will–Green Party	1,136	0.17
Batmönkhiin Batbayar	New United Coalition	1,131	0.16
Enkhbayaryn Tömör	Civil Movement Party	1,126	0.16
Bat-Ölziin Ganzorig	Civil Movement Party	1,123	0.16
Jam'yany Chuluun	Civil Movement Party	1,111	0.16
Badamjavyn Bazarvaani	Truth and Right Party	1,079	0.16
Jambaljamtsyn Jargalsaikhan	Civil Movement Party	1,063	0.15
Dashdondogiin Dagvasüren	Civil Will–Green Party	961	0.14
Ichinkhorloogiin Tserenkhand	Civil Movement Party	920	0.13
Alyeksandryn Bayarsaikhan	Civil Will–Green Party	912	0.13
Ulaankhüügiin Myagmarkhüü	HUN Party	898	0.13
Gansükhiin Batkhuyag	Motherland Party	897	0.13
Ideriin Odonchimeg	Republican Party	893	0.13
Ochgereliin Baatarkhuyag	Good Democratic Citizens United Party	772	0.11
Taravyn Mönkhbat	Republican Party	768	0.11
Khoroljavyn Enkhtulga	Good Democratic Citizens United Party	727	0.11
Mashlain Otgonbayar	For the Mongolian People Party	691	0.10
Tsend-Ayuushiin Batbold	Civil Movement Party	663	0.10
Ariunbayaryn Uyanga	People's Power Party	629	0.09
Tsagaany Ganbold	For the Mongolian People Party	629	0.09
Norovsambuugiin Enkhbold	Mongolian Conservative Party	598	0.09
Gankhüügiin Khürelkhüü	Citizen Participation Union Party	593	0.09
Myagmarsürengiin Odgerel	Citizen Participation Union Party	573	0.08
Batsürlegiin Bat-Erdene	Freedom Alliance Party	553	0.08
Khürelbaataryn Chinzorig	Citizen Participation Union Party	501	0.07
Valyagiin Bat-Otgon	People's Majority Rule Party	475	0.07
Khumbaadain Chingiskhaan	People's Majority Rule Party	443	0.06
Sanjaagiin Enkhbaatar	Republican Party	442	0.06
Altangereliin Tsolmon	Freedom Alliance Party	396	0.06
Sharavyn Ganbold	People's Power Party	388	0.06
Jadambaagiin Boroldoi	People's Power Party	320	0.05
Bayasgalangiin Amartüvshin	People's Majority Rule Party	316	0.05
Mendbayaryn Ankhkhatan	People's Majority Rule Party	278	0.04
Sanjaajavyn Dagmidmaa	Republican Party	274	0.04
Sharavdüvjiriin Amarjargal	People's Majority Rule Party	248	0.04
Lkhamkhandyn Tsevegdari	Freedom Alliance Party	242	0.04
Luvsanbaldangiin Batnasan	People's Power Party	203	0.03
Batjargalyn Nyamjargal	People's Majority Rule Party	174	0.03
Total		688,429	100.00
Valid votes		97,465	98.96
Invalid/blank votes		1,029	1.04
Total votes		98,494	100.00
Registered voters/turnout		143,143	68.81

7th Constituency
Candidate	Party	Votes	%
Ryenchinbyambyn Seddorj	Democratic Party	41,428	6.59
Borkhüügiin Delgersaikhan	Mongolian People's Party	39,331	6.26
Nanzadyn Naranbaatar	Mongolian People's Party	37,134	5.91
Luvsanbyambaagiin Mönkhbayasgalan	Democratic Party	37,019	5.89
Tsagaankhüügiin Mönkhbat	Democratic Party	36,433	5.80
Ravjikhyn Erdenebüren	Democratic Party	36,179	5.76
Gombyn Ganbaatar	Democratic Party	35,629	5.67
Ölziibayaryn Zolbayar	Mongolian People's Party	35,525	5.65
Tömörtogoogiin Enkhtüvshin	Mongolian People's Party	35,486	5.65
Batsükhiin Saranchimeg	Mongolian People's Party	34,557	5.50
Nasanbuyangiin Enkhbat	Democratic Party	32,101	5.11
Gombodorjiin Batsuuri	Mongolian People's Party	29,930	4.76
Luvsandorjiin Odser	Democratic Party	29,466	4.69
Gompildoogiin Mönkhtsetseg	Mongolian People's Party	27,930	4.45
Otgony Mönkhzayaa	National Coalition	9,809	1.56
Osoryn Ganbat	New United Coalition	9,001	1.43
Altangarigiin Büddorj	Truth and Right Party	8,100	1.29
Ulaanmaamyn Erdenebayar	Independent	7,401	1.18
Tsetsegeegiin Mönkhbayar	Truth and Right Party	6,885	1.10
Baatarsürengiin Uuganbayar	Independent	5,763	0.92
Tögsiin Enkhbayar	National Coalition	5,703	0.91
Jalbuugiin Jamsrandorj	HUN Party	4,396	0.70
Agvaany Otgonbayar	HUN Party	4,274	0.68
Bataagiin Erdenebat	National Coalition	3,990	0.64
Luvsandorjiin Khishigbayar	National Coalition	3,839	0.61
Darjaagiin Bolormaa	New United Coalition	3,617	0.58
Khüükhendüügiin Sugir	Civil Movement Party	3,315	0.53
Chuluuny Urangua	HUN Party	2,999	0.48
Myagmaryn Otgonbaatar	Civil Movement Party	2,785	0.44
Fyeodoryn Zorigoo	HUN Party	2,737	0.44
Büdeegiin Khökhöö	Truth and Right Party	2,726	0.43
Chagnaadorjiin Khongorzul	Civil Will–Green Party	2,604	0.41
Tömörkhürdiin Khürelbat	New United Coalition	2,360	0.38
Luvsannyamyn Ösökhjargal	New United Coalition	2,332	0.37
Yandagiin Boldbaatar	Civil Movement Party	2,313	0.37
Nyamdavaagiin Bolortsetseg	Truth and Right Party	2,252	0.36
Tsagaanchuluuny Mönkhzul	New United Coalition	2,209	0.35
Jamsrangiin Uranchimeg	Civil Will–Green Party	2,183	0.35
Ölzii-Orshikhyn Mönkh-Amgalan	Civil Movement Party	2,177	0.35
Khüreltsoojiin Nominsuvd	HUN Party	2,010	0.32
Dashdoorovyn Chimegsaikhan	Civil Movement Party	1,972	0.31
Baataryn Oyuun	Civil Will–Green Party	1,948	0.31
Sükhbatyn Enkhtaivan	Civil Movement Party	1,864	0.30
Törmönkhiin Buyanjargal	Civil Movement Party	1,764	0.28
Oyuunbatyn Bayasakh	Civil Will–Green Party	1,711	0.27
Tsogbaataryn Gandolgor	HUN Party	1,584	0.25
Janjaadorjiin Oyuunbayar	HUN Party	1,576	0.25
Nyamyn Tserendavga	New United Coalition	1,493	0.24
Batboldyn Javkhlan	Republican Party	1,468	0.23
Bataagiin Gerelt-Tsolmon	Truth and Right Party	1,418	0.23
Dagvadorjiin Dovchinsüren	Truth and Right Party	1,414	0.23
Myagmarsürengiin Sarangaravuu	Motherland Party	1,388	0.22
Sharkhüügiin Buyantogtokh	People's Majority Rule Party	1,240	0.20
Sanjaajavyn Tsogzolmaa	Republican Party	841	0.13
Baatarjavyn Batbayar	Republican Party	786	0.13
Ikhbaataryn Zolzayaa	Freedom Alliance Party	661	0.11
Gürsoronzongombosüre Ngiin Otgonbaatar	Freedom Alliance Party	655	0.10
Amarsanaagiin Mönkhzul	Freedom Alliance Party	596	0.09
Sodnomyn Nergüi	People's Power Party	581	0.09
Ganzorigiin Mönkh-Erdene	Freedom Alliance Party	565	0.09
Olzvoin Togtokhzayaa	Citizen Participation Union Party	560	0.09
Semjidiin Enkhtüvshin	Mongolian Conservative Party	559	0.09
Ganbaataryn Enkh-Undrakh	People's Power Party	492	0.08
Nyamkhüügiin Galbadrakh	Good Democratic Citizens United Party	477	0.08
Altantulgyn Khaliun	People's Power Party	421	0.07
Sangaagiin Myagmar-Od	People's Power Party	415	0.07
Damdinbaljiryn Sarantuyaa	Good Democratic Citizens United Party	410	0.07
Ganbatyn Pürevdemberel	For the Mongolian People Party	404	0.06
Davaasürengiin Narangarav	Good Democratic Citizens United Party	399	0.06
Enkhboldyn Chinbold	For the Mongolian People Party	370	0.06
Bashliin Nyamkhüü	Citizen Participation Union Party	333	0.05
Baasanjavyn Batzul	Mongolian Conservative Party	330	0.05
Sharkhüügiin Tsogmaam	For the Mongolian People Party	324	0.05
Byambajavyn Ölziikhishig	Citizen Participation Union Party	324	0.05
Luvsanjambyn Khash-Erdene	Mongolian Conservative Party	281	0.04
Nyamsürengiin Erdenechimeg	Freedom Alliance Party	275	0.04
Chogdogiin Byambatseren	Citizen Participation Union Party	261	0.04
Ochirkhüügiin Altanbayar	Citizen Participation Union Party	222	0.04
Total		628,310	100.00
Valid votes		89,331	99.39
Invalid/blank votes		551	0.61
Total votes		89,882	100.00
Registered voters/turnout		132,090	68.05

8th Constituency
Candidate	Party	Votes	%
Jigjidsürengiin Chinbüren	Mongolian People's Party	58,854	6.81
Battömöriin Enkhbayar	Mongolian People's Party	56,247	6.51
Pürevsürengiin Naranbayar	HUN Party	53,358	6.18
Enkhtaivany Bat-Amgalan	Mongolian People's Party	52,872	6.12
Khürelbaataryn Bulgantuya	Mongolian People's Party	51,214	5.93
Natsagiin Bayarmönkh	Mongolian People's Party	48,230	5.58
Mainbayaryn Tulgat	Democratic Party	47,893	5.54
Tümendelgeriin Battsogt	Democratic Party	45,661	5.29
Ganboldyn Bolormaa	Democratic Party	45,549	5.27
Tsagaan-Övgönii Jadambaa	Democratic Party	41,312	4.78
Ochirsuuriin Tsetsegbal	HUN Party	29,472	3.41
Ganboldyn Uugantsetseg	Democratic Party	27,955	3.24
Ganbaataryn Battömör	HUN Party	24,340	2.82
Erdenechimegiin Enkhzorig	New United Coalition	18,711	2.17
Dorjlkhagvyn Battsetseg	HUN Party	17,618	2.04
Ganboldyn Batbold	Good Democratic Citizens United Party	16,941	1.96
Buyantogtokhyn Alimaa	HUN Party	16,216	1.88
Bayarboldyn Jadamba	National Coalition	15,527	1.80
Boldyn Gantulga	New United Coalition	11,542	1.34
Buyandelgeriin Nandin-Erdene	Civil Will–Green Party	8,421	0.97
Damdinsürengiin Mönkhtsetseg	Civil Will–Green Party	8,376	0.97
Yadamsürengiin Batkhüü	New United Coalition	7,831	0.91
Namkhaidagvyn Temüüjin	Truth and Right Party	7,765	0.90
Batdelgeriin Erdenebayar	National Coalition	7,687	0.89
Bat-Ochiryn Tsatsral	Freedom Alliance Party	7,578	0.88
Enkhtuyaagiin Erdenetuyaa	New United Coalition	7,123	0.82
Pürevtserengiin Enkhtsetseg	National Coalition	6,789	0.79
Tsendiin Mönkhtsatsral	National Coalition	6,625	0.77
Gürdorjiin Batbayar	New United Coalition	6,420	0.74
Gandansürengiin Ganzorig	Civil Will–Green Party	6,292	0.73
Jamsrangiin Batsükh	Civil Will–Green Party	6,040	0.70
Enkhjargalyn Odbayar	Civil Will–Green Party	5,608	0.65
Gotovyn Battulga	Republican Party	4,841	0.56
Batbayaryn Ariunzayaa	Citizen Participation Union Party	4,086	0.47
Chuluunkhüügiin Uuganbaatar	Truth and Right Party	3,428	0.40
Tsedmaajavyn Batdorj	Truth and Right Party	3,421	0.40
Chuluunbaataryn Sugarsüren	Truth and Right Party	3,241	0.38
Dashtserengiin Tögsbayar	Civil Movement Party	3,065	0.35
Amartüvshingiin Bolor-Erdene	Civil Movement Party	2,949	0.34
Zorigtyn Otgonbayar	Freedom Implementing Party	2,569	0.30
Gombogüriin Undram	Civil Movement Party	2,559	0.30
Dorjkhandyn Narantuyaa	For the Mongolian People Party	2,514	0.29
Luvsandorjiin Batbayar	Republican Party	2,478	0.29
Tsogbadrakhyn Batbold	Citizen Participation Union Party	2,391	0.28
Rentsengiin Sünjidmaa	Republican Party	2,257	0.26
Ulambayaryn Khosbayar	Mongolian Conservative Party	2,140	0.25
Bayarsaikhany Ganchimeg	Republican Party	2,101	0.24
Dashtsoodolyn Khandsüren	Citizen Participation Union Party	2,072	0.24
Baasandorjiin Altanzul	Civil Movement Party	2,038	0.24
Sükhbaataryn Batbold	Motherland Party	2,009	0.23
Battulgyn Batbaatar	People's Power Party	1,974	0.23
Davaatserengiin Lkhachinsüren	Truth and Right Party	1,955	0.23
Erdenebatyn Amarmönkh	Republican Party	1,875	0.22
Tserendorjiin Altantsetseg	Motherland Party	1,815	0.21
Altan-Avdaryn Ireedüi	People's Power Party	1,808	0.21
Vanluugiin Dügermaa	People's Majority Rule Party	1,794	0.21
Tüüchintavyn Dorjgotov	Citizen Participation Union Party	1,645	0.19
Dorjgotovyn Otgonbayar	For the Mongolian People Party	1,574	0.18
Rentsendashiin Olonbayar	Mongolian Social Democratic Party	1,509	0.17
Delgerbatyn Nasanbayar	Freedom Alliance Party	1,491	0.17
Altankhuyagiin Tegshbayar	For the Mongolian People Party	1,469	0.17
Nyamdorjiin Sodchimeg	Civil Movement Party	1,446	0.17
Bat-Erdeniin Tserenlkham	Citizen Participation Union Party	1,398	0.16
Altankhüügiin Mönkhtuyaa	For the Mongolian People Party	1,230	0.14
Baastyn Zorigbayar	Freedom Implementing Party	1,180	0.14
Bayarmagnaigiin Taivanbaatar	Freedom Alliance Party	1,158	0.13
Dondogiin Tömörbaatar	People's Majority Rule Party	1,156	0.13
Otgonbayaryn Ariuntuyaa	Mongolian Conservative Party	1,151	0.13
Erdenebatyn Enkhbaatar	People's Majority Rule Party	1,111	0.13
Baigali-Erdeniin Ariunaa	Mongolian Social Democratic Party	1,100	0.13
Enkhboldyn Mergenshagai	Good Democratic Citizens United Party	1,058	0.12
Sharav-Osoryn Khandsüren	Motherland Party	1,057	0.12
Nokhoijavyn Batbold	Good Democratic Citizens United Party	1,055	0.12
Togmidyn Sünjidmaa	People's Power Party	1,027	0.12
Erdene-Ochiryn Enkhbold	Mongolian Conservative Party	955	0.11
Shagdarsürengiin Tögsbayar	Mongolian Social Democratic Party	870	0.10
Ayuushiin Dolgor	People's Majority Rule Party	866	0.10
Serchindorjiin Byamba	Freedom Alliance Party	857	0.10
Bayarsaikhany Chimegsaikhan	Good Democratic Citizens United Party	851	0.10
Dendeviin Sandagsüren	Motherland Party	844	0.10
Nergüin Enkhee	People's Majority Rule Party	840	0.10
Zorigtyn Khand	People's Power Party	775	0.09
Amarsaikhany Batjargal	People's Power Party	760	0.09
Total		863,880	100.00
Valid votes		171,536	99.10
Invalid/blank votes		1,550	0.90
Total votes		173,086	100.00
Registered voters/turnout		243,918	70.96

9th Constituency
Candidate	Party	Votes	%
Jargalsaikhany Zoljargal	HUN Party	39,771	12.71
Khassuuriin Gankhuyag	Mongolian People's Party	39,012	12.46
Jambalyn Ganbaatar	Mongolian People's Party	28,414	9.08
Ölzii-Orshikhyn Sum'yabaatar	Mongolian People's Party	27,941	8.93
Sharavdembereliin Enkhtuul	HUN Party	20,698	6.61
Tserendulamyn Altantsetseg	Democratic Party	16,539	5.28
Sodnomzunduin Erdene	Democratic Party	15,852	5.06
Tömör-Ukhnyn Zolboot	HUN Party	15,476	4.94
Tsedeviin Tavanchuluu	Democratic Party	13,485	4.31
Namsraijavyn Enkhchimeg	National Coalition	12,180	3.89
Altankhuyagiin Barkhüü	New United Coalition	8,546	2.73
Jargalsaikhany Khongorzul	National Coalition	7,864	2.51
Tsültemiin Enkhjin	Civil Will–Green Party	4,905	1.57
Grishagiin Uugankhüü	Civil Will–Green Party	4,796	1.53
Taivanbaataryn Orgilmönkh	New United Coalition	4,112	1.31
Khürelbaataryn Suvdaa	Civil Will–Green Party	3,980	1.27
Tömörkhuyagiin Narantuyaa	Civil Movement Party	3,939	1.26
Boryn Möngönkhishig	New United Coalition	3,855	1.23
Bayasgalangiin Sükhbaatar	Truth and Right Party	3,430	1.10
Ganbaataryn Shijirbat	Independent	3,021	0.97
Regzengiin Batbayar	Republican Party	2,679	0.86
Dorjsürengiin Enkh-Amgalan	Independent	2,584	0.83
Dorjderemiin Erdenetuyaa	Citizen Participation Union Party	2,176	0.70
Otgonbayaryn Oyuundari	Civil Movement Party	2,159	0.69
Galsangiin Nyamdarjaa	Independent	2,015	0.64
Sugarjavyn Tserensodnom	Independent	1,745	0.56
Tömörkhuyagiin Bolortungalag	Civil Movement Party	1,732	0.55
Chuluundorjiin Battunkhag	Truth and Right Party	1,675	0.54
Mönkhtogoogiin Byambabat	Citizen Participation Union Party	1,469	0.47
Enkhbaataryn Byambasüren	Republican Party	1,463	0.47
Natsagiin Maraltsetseg	Republican Party	1,391	0.44
Chuluunbatyn Nyamsambuu	Good Democratic Citizens United Party	1,361	0.43
Ganbatyn Mönkhjargal	For the Mongolian People Party	1,290	0.41
Dugarsürengiin Boldbaatar	People's Power Party	1,160	0.37
Shoovdoryn Tömörsükh	Freedom Implementing Party	1,083	0.35
Jalbaagiin Batbileg	Mongolian Conservative Party	978	0.31
Dorjiin Baigalmaa	Motherland Party	860	0.27
Buyandalain Byambasüren	Citizen Participation Union Party	836	0.27
Sodnompilyn Ninj	Motherland Party	822	0.26
Altanbaganyn Manlaibaatar	Freedom Alliance Party	708	0.23
Tserenbaljiryn Zorigtbaatar	People's Majority Rule Party	646	0.21
Batmönkhiin Byambagerel	Freedom Alliance Party	571	0.18
Gantömöriin Tuul	Motherland Party	531	0.17
Dugarjavyn Bayanmönkh	Freedom Alliance Party	523	0.17
Ganbatyn Ariunbüüvei	People's Power Party	520	0.17
Tsendiin Batsükh	People's Majority Rule Party	507	0.16
Chogsomyn Oyuuntungalag	Freedom Implementing Party	468	0.15
Dolgorsürengiin Bayarsaikhan	Freedom Implementing Party	443	0.14
Damdinsürengiin Odgerel	People's Majority Rule Party	443	0.14
Mönkh-Amgalangiin Baasantsend	People's Power Party	357	0.11
Total		313,011	100.00
Valid votes		103,875	99.34
Invalid/blank votes		693	0.66
Total votes		104,568	100.00
Registered voters/turnout		145,838	71.70

10th Constituency
Candidate	Party	Votes	%
Nyam-Osoryn Uchral	Mongolian People's Party	67,107	8.85
Otgonsharyn Batnairamdal	Mongolian People's Party	43,261	5.71
Tsendiin Baatarkhüü	Democratic Party	36,540	4.82
Natsagdorjiin Batsümberel	Mongolian People's Party	34,261	4.52
Damdiny Tsogtbaatar	Mongolian People's Party	32,907	4.34
Khökhkhüügiin Bolormaa	Democratic Party	32,279	4.26
Bazarsadyn Jargalsaikhan	Republican Party	30,930	4.08
Ganzorigiin Dashnyam	Mongolian People's Party	30,727	4.05
Chadraabalyn Önörbayar	Democratic Party	29,446	3.88
Mönkhöögiin Oyuunchimeg	Mongolian People's Party	27,995	3.69
Davaasürengiin Badarsan	Democratic Party	26,906	3.55
Tsenddorjiin Erdenebat	HUN Party	26,379	3.48
Ishjamtsyn Mönkhjargal	Democratic Party	25,449	3.36
Oktyabriin Baasankhüü	Democratic Party	23,769	3.14
Pürveegiin Bayarkhüü	National Coalition	16,144	2.13
Dorjvalyn Enkhjargal	HUN Party	14,630	1.93
Dorjoogiin Batsaikhan	HUN Party	14,337	1.89
Ranjilyn Badmaanyambuu	HUN Party	13,607	1.80
Battsengeliin Khash-Erdene	HUN Party	12,197	1.61
Ragchaagiin Erdenebileg	HUN Party	11,881	1.57
Davaagiin Ganbold	National Coalition	11,761	1.55
Jukovyn Bayarjavkhlan	Civil Will–Green Party	10,986	1.45
Dashiin Batsükh	Independent	10,903	1.44
Chimeddorjiin Amarsanaa	New United Coalition	9,346	1.23
Tserendambyn Bayarkhüü	New United Coalition	7,939	1.05
Tsegmediin Bumtsend	New United Coalition	7,934	1.05
Enebishiin Odontuyaa	Civil Will–Green Party	7,657	1.01
Jargalsaikhany Ünenbayar	Truth and Right Party	7,278	0.96
Jamsrandorjiin Tsogzolmaa	National Coalition	6,829	0.90
Sanjaasürengiin Ganbat	National Coalition	5,990	0.79
Mönkhbatyn Ariunzul	New United Coalition	5,229	0.69
Serjgotovyn Khan-Uul	Civil Will–Green Party	5,076	0.67
Chimedregzengiin Batbaatar	New United Coalition	4,568	0.60
Myangan-Yondongiin Mönkhjargal	Civil Will–Green Party	4,444	0.59
Zorigiin Tuyaa	Citizen Participation Union Party	4,292	0.57
Enkhboldyn Bat-Orshikh	Truth and Right Party	4,197	0.55
Nergüin Lkhagva-Ochir	Civil Will–Green Party	4,123	0.54
Sambuugiin Tömörbat	Republican Party	3,839	0.51
Erdeniin Odongerel	Mongolian Conservative Party	3,772	0.50
Tsendsürengiin Ganbat	Civil Movement Party	3,697	0.49
Yondonsambuugiin Batbayar	Republican Party	3,472	0.46
Tsogtsaikhany Pürevsüren	New United Coalition	3,453	0.46
Myagmarjavyn Uranchimeg	Truth and Right Party	3,422	0.45
Günzengiin Byambadorj	Civil Will–Green Party	3,303	0.44
Dashzevegiin Ad'yaabaatar	Truth and Right Party	2,631	0.35
Jantsandorjiin Yanjinsüren	Republican Party	2,472	0.33
Shagdarsürengiin Ariunaa	Civil Movement Party	2,236	0.29
Baasanjavyn Amarsaikhan	For the Mongolian People Party	2,152	0.28
Batsükhiin Gombosüren	Truth and Right Party	2,137	0.28
Erdene-Ochiryn Ankhtuyaa	Civil Movement Party	2,135	0.28
Tömörkhuyagiin Ögöömörzayaa	Citizen Participation Union Party	1,953	0.26
Khürelbaataryn Zorig	Citizen Participation Union Party	1,929	0.25
Jantsanpüreviin Amgalanbaatar	People's Power Party	1,888	0.25
Ganbaataryn Uranchimeg	Civil Movement Party	1,879	0.25
Sarantuyaagiin Narantuyaa	Freedom Implementing Party	1,859	0.25
Törbatyn Tenüün	Motherland Party	1,709	0.23
Dugarjavyn Ariunaa	Citizen Participation Union Party	1,699	0.22
Batbaataryn Günjinlkham	Civil Movement Party	1,684	0.22
Boldoogiin Batnasan	Motherland Party	1,662	0.22
Rentsendoorovyn Battömör	People's Majority Rule Party	1,554	0.21
Dorjiin Soyolmaa	Motherland Party	1,552	0.20
Dorjgotovyn Nyamtseren	Civil Movement Party	1,472	0.19
Baatarjavyn Altanbagana	Good Democratic Citizens United Party	1,458	0.19
Myagmardashiin Orkhonbayar	Citizen Participation Union Party	1,432	0.19
Byambaagiin Ganbaatar	Freedom Alliance Party	1,353	0.18
Sambuugiin Mönkhtsetseg	For the Mongolian People Party	1,330	0.18
Lkhagvajavyn Tuyaa	People's Power Party	1,293	0.17
Namsrain Enkhtsolmon	Good Democratic Citizens United Party	1,200	0.16
Avidyn Tamir	For the Mongolian People Party	1,192	0.16
Bayarmagnaigiin Önör-Orshikh	Freedom Alliance Party	1,168	0.15
Baljiryn Mönkhtuyaa	Freedom Alliance Party	1,167	0.15
Tulgaagiin Zolbayar	Freedom Alliance Party	1,047	0.14
Lamjavyn Adilbish	Freedom Implementing Party	1,037	0.14
Bürenjargalyn Batmönkh	Freedom Implementing Party	1,004	0.13
Sükhbaataryn Sod-Erdene	People's Power Party	991	0.13
Baasangiin Otgontsetseg	People's Power Party	932	0.12
Bazarbidarinyn Dorjsüren	Citizen Participation Union Party	922	0.12
Ganbatyn Sanchir	People's Power Party	921	0.12
Tömörkhuyagiin Khandmaa	Motherland Party	904	0.12
Jadambyn Naranchimeg	People's Power Party	836	0.11
Pürevdorjiin Erdenebulgan	Freedom Alliance Party	830	0.11
Sanjmyatavyn Saruul-Amidral	People's Majority Rule Party	783	0.10
Erdenetsogtyn Batchimeg	Freedom Alliance Party	780	0.10
Mudgyn Togtokhbayar	Motherland Party	744	0.10
Tseveendorjiin Erdemt	People's Majority Rule Party	725	0.10
Dashrentsengiin Naranjargal	People's Majority Rule Party	708	0.09
Dashzevegiin Lkhagvabayar	Good Democratic Citizens United Party	696	0.09
Khürelbaataryn Enkhtuyaa	Freedom Implementing Party	683	0.09
Bazarvaaniin Uranbileg	Motherland Party	660	0.09
Byambaagiin Zuunnast	For the Mongolian People Party	654	0.09
Chuluunbaataryn Bayarsodnom	People's Majority Rule Party	604	0.08
Gombojavyn Oyuunbayar	Freedom Implementing Party	592	0.08
Dariin Lkhagvadorj	People's Majority Rule Party	463	0.06
Total		757,974	100.00
Valid votes		125,249	98.98
Invalid/blank votes		1,296	1.02
Total votes		126,545	100.00
Registered voters/turnout		182,511	69.34

11th Constituency
Candidate	Party	Votes	%
Enkhbayaryn Batshugar	Mongolian People's Party	58,914	8.48
Norovyn Altankhuyag	Democratic Party	53,659	7.73
Narantsetsegiin Altanshagai	Mongolian People's Party	48,527	6.99
Pürevjavyn Sainzorig	Mongolian People's Party	46,833	6.74
Chinbatyn Nomin	Mongolian People's Party	44,187	6.36
Nyamdavaagiin Khürelbaatar	Mongolian People's Party	43,661	6.29
Nemekhbayaryn Amarjin	Democratic Party	39,842	5.74
Pürevdorjiin Galindev	Democratic Party	35,050	5.05
Gantömöriin Khajidmaa	Civil Will–Green Party	28,541	4.11
Jadambaagiin Otgonbayar	Democratic Party	27,939	4.02
Tsoggereliin Uyanga	Democratic Party	19,985	2.88
Gansükhiin Maitsetseg	HUN Party	19,151	2.76
Baljinnyamyn Tsegmed	Independent	18,293	2.63
Jagvaralyn Tömörkhuyag	HUN Party	13,080	1.88
Gendendaramyn Batzorig	HUN Party	10,725	1.54
Chuluuny Bayarsaikhan	HUN Party	10,662	1.54
Otgonsürengiin Tsogtbayar	Civil Will–Green Party	8,350	1.20
Ochirbatyn Uuganbayar	Civil Will–Green Party	7,745	1.12
Jügdernamjilyn Bayarkhüü	Truth and Right Party	7,734	1.11
Jargalsaikhany Üüriinzayaa	Civil Will–Green Party	7,596	1.09
Narantsetsegiin Oyuungerel	Civil Movement Party	6,161	0.89
Nyam-Osoryn Bürenbat	National Coalition	6,030	0.87
Tömörkhuyagiin Naranzul	New United Coalition	5,761	0.83
Tsetsegmaagiin Baasanjav	Civil Will–Green Party	5,519	0.79
Tümen-Oiloogiin Tsooj	New United Coalition	5,410	0.78
Tseveenii Beejin	National Coalition	5,254	0.76
Badarchiin Odkhüü	Independent	5,186	0.75
Nyangaryn Batchuluun	New United Coalition	5,131	0.74
Narantsetsegiin Battogtokh	New United Coalition	5,088	0.73
Baatar-Ochiryn Enkhnaran	National Coalition	4,322	0.62
Namdagiin Natsagdorj	Independent	4,320	0.62
Yunrengiin Darambazar	Independent	4,120	0.59
Zagdaagiin Gerelt-Od	Truth and Right Party	3,849	0.55
Düngeegiin Lkhagvadorj	New United Coalition	3,616	0.52
Lkhagvyn Enkhbold	Independent	3,572	0.51
Ad'yaagiin Erdenebileg	Mongolian Social Democratic Party	3,418	0.49
Choijiljavyn Batbayar	Republican Party	3,328	0.48
Dünshigiin Myagmarsüren	Truth and Right Party	3,013	0.43
Dogsomchuluuny Üüriintuyaa	Civil Movement Party	2,892	0.42
Dashdorjiin Myadagmaa	Truth and Right Party	2,841	0.41
Khishigdulamyn Oyuunbayar	Truth and Right Party	2,819	0.41
Dorjjantsangiin Bolortuyaa	Republican Party	2,518	0.36
Sükhiin Ochir	Republican Party	2,423	0.35
Dashdorjiin Narmandakh	Republican Party	2,345	0.34
Khadbaataryn Batchimeg	Civil Movement Party	2,328	0.34
Pürevjavyn Bayarkhüü	Freedom Alliance Party	2,216	0.32
Ganbaataryn Amartüvshin	Freedom Alliance Party	2,076	0.30
Ichinkhorloogiin Sarangerel	Citizen Participation Union Party	1,959	0.28
Tserenbatyn Badamsüren	Civil Movement Party	1,795	0.26
Baatarjavyn Ganzorig	For the Mongolian People Party	1,681	0.24
Batsuuriin Enkh-Amgalan	Motherland Party	1,625	0.23
Naryn Sarangerel	Freedom Alliance Party	1,532	0.22
Shagdaryn Ölziitogtokh	Citizen Participation Union Party	1,483	0.21
Byambajavyn Nyamtsagaan	Civil Movement Party	1,478	0.21
Badarchiin Yeröölt	Motherland Party	1,425	0.21
Sharav-Osoryn Gantögs	Motherland Party	1,347	0.19
Boldyn Enkhtüvshin	Mongolian Conservative Party	1,198	0.17
Uranchimegiin Khaliunaa	Freedom Alliance Party	1,162	0.17
Chimediin Baasanjav	People's Power Party	1,125	0.16
Ganboldyn Khongorzul	Freedom Implementing Party	1,113	0.16
Javzangiin Namnansüren	People's Power Party	1,048	0.15
Togoogiin Ganbat	Citizen Participation Union Party	1,045	0.15
Boldbaataryn Tungalagkharaa	Republican Party	1,017	0.15
Chültemsürengiin Chunt	Citizen Participation Union Party	998	0.14
Lkhündeviin Lkhagvadorj	People's Majority Rule Party	944	0.14
Ajirshavgaany Enkhbaatar	Citizen Participation Union Party	937	0.13
Yundengiin Batchuluun	For the Mongolian People Party	890	0.13
Boldyn Soyol-Erdene	Freedom Implementing Party	856	0.12
Tsendkhüügiin Zandankhüü	For the Mongolian People Party	849	0.12
Sampilnorovyn Batbold	For the Mongolian People Party	840	0.12
Pürevsürengiin Ulambayar	People's Power Party	839	0.12
Begziin Khishigbayar	People's Majority Rule Party	811	0.12
Khishigtogtokhyn Mönkhtogtokh	Mongolian Conservative Party	779	0.11
Amindavaagiin Davaadorj	Good Democratic Citizens United Party	775	0.11
Dulamyn Sanchir	Good Democratic Citizens United Party	756	0.11
Tömör-Ochiryn Myagmardorj	Motherland Party	743	0.11
Nasbatyn Sugarsüren	Motherland Party	729	0.10
Sharavyn Tömör	Freedom Implementing Party	697	0.10
Nyamdovdongiin Gantuyaa	People's Majority Rule Party	684	0.10
Baasansürengiin Oyuunjargal	Good Democratic Citizens United Party	656	0.09
Tsogtbaataryn Baasandorj	Mongolian Conservative Party	652	0.09
Namnangiin Enkh-Ölzii	People's Majority Rule Party	557	0.08
Denzengiin Chuluunbat	People's Majority Rule Party	548	0.08
Lkhamyn Khishigdavaa	Freedom Implementing Party	476	0.07
Khuunain Böndör	People's Power Party	471	0.07
Total		694,550	100.00
Valid votes		137,878	99.07
Invalid/blank votes		1,290	0.93
Total votes		139,168	100.00
Registered voters/turnout		219,313	63.46

12th Constituency
Candidate	Party	Votes	%
Togtmolyn Mönkhsaikhan	Mongolian People's Party	45,396	13.11
Chuluunbilegiin Lodoisambuu	Democratic Party	40,937	11.82
Jukovyn Aldarjavkhlan	Mongolian People's Party	40,915	11.82
Sanjaadorjiin Molor-Erdene	Civil Will–Green Party	22,474	6.49
Tsedevdambyn Oyungerel	Citizen Participation Union Party	22,419	6.47
Luvsandashiin Ninjjamts	Mongolian People's Party	22,384	6.46
Erdene-Ochiryn Tamir	Democratic Party	17,090	4.94
Byambasürengiin Jagar	Good Democratic Citizens United Party	16,261	4.70
Banzragchiin Otgontögs	HUN Party	15,594	4.50
Sodnomdorjiin Sanaser	HUN Party	15,470	4.47
Byambyn Ariunbold	Democratic Party	14,002	4.04
Altansükhiin Mandakhnaran	HUN Party	11,051	3.19
Batmönkhiin Tsetsegsaikhan	National Coalition	5,705	1.65
Khosbayaryn Amarsaikhan	National Coalition	5,647	1.63
Altangereliin Batmönkh	Independent	4,858	1.40
Seteviin Shaariibuu	Civil Will–Green Party	4,095	1.18
Byambasürengiin Bayarmaa	New United Coalition	3,824	1.10
Shagdarsürengiin Bat-Erdene	New United Coalition	3,590	1.04
Nadmidtserengiin Tamir	New United Coalition	3,584	1.04
Tsogt-Ochiryn Jargalsaikhan	Republican Party	3,180	0.92
Batbayaryn Bat-Ochir	Truth and Right Party	3,154	0.91
Boldyn Mönkhsaikhan	Truth and Right Party	2,891	0.83
Bayarkhüügiin Bat-Yalalt	Freedom Alliance Party	2,195	0.63
Pürevkhüügiin Minjmaa	Civil Will–Green Party	2,132	0.62
Jürmediin Zanaa	Civil Movement Party	1,972	0.57
Barbaataryn Bolortuyaa	Civil Movement Party	1,470	0.42
Chuluunbatyn Batchimeg	Citizen Participation Union Party	1,353	0.39
Gankhuyagiin Undral	Truth and Right Party	1,318	0.38
Pürevdorjiin Bayartüvshin	Citizen Participation Union Party	1,259	0.36
Bayaraagiin Amarmend	Civil Movement Party	1,168	0.34
Zandar'yaagiin Ariunaa	Republican Party	830	0.24
Gochoosürengiin Batjargal	Mongolian Conservative Party	785	0.23
Baasanbyambyn Sanchirmaa	Republican Party	767	0.22
Tsagaany Chinbat	Motherland Party	579	0.17
Distein Tulga	For the Mongolian People Party	522	0.15
Ganboldyn Ariuntuyaa	Motherland Party	501	0.14
Tserendagvyn Oyuunaa	Mongolian Social Democratic Party	451	0.13
Banzragchiin Törbold	Mongolian Social Democratic Party	441	0.13
Tömöriin Ganchimeg	Freedom Alliance Party	425	0.12
Battömöriin Mönkhtsetseg	People's Power Party	420	0.12
Dorjpüreviin Tsolmonkhüü	People's Power Party	417	0.12
Pürevdorjiin Enkhmend	Freedom Alliance Party	411	0.12
Yundengiin Batbold	For the Mongolian People Party	397	0.11
Baljinnyamyn Narangerel	For the Mongolian People Party	393	0.11
Bayaraagiin Mandakh	People's Power Party	369	0.11
Sükhbaataryn Bürentsogt	Motherland Party	361	0.10
Tsegmediin Dagvadorj	People's Majority Rule Party	311	0.09
Jam'yangiin Pürevdorj	People's Majority Rule Party	270	0.08
Dügerjavyn Batbaatar	People's Majority Rule Party	228	0.07
Total		346,266	100.00
Valid votes		115,068	99.54
Invalid/blank votes		531	0.46
Total votes		115,599	100.00
Registered voters/turnout		153,077	75.52

13th Constituency
Candidate	Party	Votes	%
Sainbuyangiin Amarsaikhan	Mongolian People's Party	16,539	26.26
Tsendiin Sandag-Ochir	Mongolian People's Party	12,347	19.60
Dashzevegiin Altankhuyag	Democratic Party	9,745	15.47
Ganaagiin Tsambagarav	Democratic Party	7,493	11.90
Badralyn Mönkhdöl	HUN Party	3,517	5.58
Bat-Ochiryn Enkhmaa	HUN Party	3,142	4.99
Sükhbaataryn Tsogzolmaa	National Coalition	2,151	3.42
Batbilegiin Erdenebayar	New United Coalition	1,245	1.98
Mangaagiin Batnasan	Civil Will–Green Party	1,189	1.89
Naranbadrakhyn Enkhbold	Truth and Right Party	849	1.35
Myagmarjavyn Baatarkhuyag	Truth and Right Party	558	0.89
Lkhagvyn Densmaa	Civil Movement Party	376	0.60
Tömörbaataryn Batbold	Republican Party	342	0.54
Chuluuny Manduul	Freedom Implementing Party	342	0.54
Altantsoojiin Khaliunaa	Civil Movement Party	317	0.50
Dorjvain Enkhtör	Motherland Party	281	0.45
Gerelmaagiin Ankhzayaa	For the Mongolian People Party	245	0.39
Dorjpalamyn Tsengelmaa	Mongolian Liberal Democratic Party	232	0.37
Bat-Ochiryn Otgon	Freedom Alliance Party	231	0.37
Tündeviin Dariimaa	United Patriots Party	213	0.34
Sandagdariin Ganbaatar	People's Majority Rule Party	183	0.29
Tseveliin Dolgormaa	People's Majority Rule Party	183	0.29
Lkhagvaagiin Khulan	Freedom Alliance Party	175	0.28
Chuluuntogtokhyn Gansüren	Citizen Participation Union Party	175	0.28
Samdannorovyn Zoltoi	Republican Party	164	0.26
Mönkhtuyaagiin Oyuunkhishig	Citizen Participation Union Party	158	0.25
Naranchimegiin Uyanga	People's Majority Rule Party	145	0.23
Tamiryn Tögöldör	People's Majority Rule Party	120	0.19
Minaryn Büdragchaa	Mongolian Conservative Party	116	0.18
Batjargalyn Bayarmaa	Mongolian Conservative Party	89	0.14
Nagaanragchaagiin Khangalbaatar	Good Democratic Citizens United Party	62	0.10
Boldbaataryn Bolor	Good Democratic Citizens United Party	62	0.10
Total		62,986	100.00
Valid votes		31,401	99.42
Invalid/blank votes		184	0.58
Total votes		31,585	100.00
Registered voters/turnout		48,489	65.14

=== Incumbents who were unseated ===
Members of Parliament who lost re-election
MP	Seat	First elected	Party	New MP	New party
Gombojavyn Zandanshatar	Bayankhongor	2004 (Note: Zandanshatar lost his seat in 2012 but was re-elected through an election in 2016)	Mongolian People's Party	Not applicable	
Amgalangiin Adiyaasüren	Bayankhongor	2020	Democratic Party	Not applicable	
Dulamdorjiin Togtokhsüren	Övörkhangai	2016	Mongolian People's Party	Not applicable	
Sodnomyn Chinzorig	Övörkhangai	2016	Mongolian People's Party	Not applicable	
Gochoogiin Ganbold	Övörkhangai	2020	Mongolian People's Party	Not applicable	
Tsedendambyn Tserenpuntsag	Zavkhan	2020	Mongolian People's Party	Not applicable	
Baljinnyamyn Bayarsaikhan	Zavkhan	2020	Mongolian People's Party	Not applicable	
Shirnenbanidiin Adishaa	Khovd	2020	Democratic Party	Not applicable	
Chimediin Khürelbaatar	Uvs	2008	Mongolian People's Party	Not applicable	
Damdinsürengiin Önörbolor	Selenge	2020	Mongolian People's Party	Not applicable	
Purev-Ochiryn Anujin	Songino Khairkhan	2020	Mongolian People's Party	Not applicable	
Nayantain Ganibal	Sükhbaatar	2020	Democratic Party	Not applicable	
Tömörtogoogiin Enkhtüvshin	Dornogovi	2020	Mongolian People's Party	Not applicable	
Batsükhiin Saranchimeg	Bayanzürkh	2016	Mongolian People's Party	Not applicable	
Gompildoogiin Mönkhtsetseg	Dundgovi; Govisümber	2016	Mongolian People's Party	Not applicable	
Mönkhöögiin Oyuunchimeg	Chingeltei	2016	Mongolian People's Party	Not applicable	

== Legal system ==
The new constitution empowered a Judicial General Council (JGC) to select all judges and protect their rights. The Supreme Court is the highest judicial body. Justices are nominated by the JGC, confirmed by the State Great Khural, and appointed by the president. The Supreme Court is constitutionally empowered to examine all lower court decisions—excluding specialized court rulings—upon appeal and provide official interpretations on all laws except the constitution.

Specialized civil, criminal, and administrative courts exist at all levels and are not subject to Supreme Court supervision. Local authorities—district and city governors—ensure that these courts abide by presidential decrees and SGKh decisions. At the apex of the judicial system is the Constitutional Court of Mongolia, which consists of nine members, including a chairman, appointed for a six-year term, whose jurisdiction extends solely over the interpretation of the constitution.

The constitution states that the Judicial branch of the government should be independent of any outside influences and government officials. However, in 2019, the State Great Khural passed a law that allows the National Security Council (a non-constitutional advisory body to the president) to dismiss judges who are "dishonest", effectively removing their immunity that meant to prevent outside interventions in court decisions. Various civil movements, international organisations, and prominent individuals (including the former president Tsakhiagiin Elbegdorj) have denounced the decision, sparking a constitutional crisis lasting 8 months. A constitutional amendment, made in November 2019, reverted this decision and empowered the prime minister whilst also limiting the presidential term from a maximum of two four-year terms to a single six-year term.

== Administrative divisions ==
Mongolia is divided into 21 provinces (aimags) and one provincial municipality: Arkhangai, Bayan-Ölgii, Bayankhongor, Bulgan, Darkhan-Uul, Dornod, Dornogovi, Dundgovi, Govi-Altai, Govisümber, Khentii, Khovd, Khövsgöl, Ömnögovi, Orkhon, Övörkhangai, Selenge, Sükhbaatar, Töv, Uvs, Zavkhan, and the city of Ulaanbaatar.

Local elections are held every four years in all 21 provinces and the capital, electing representatives to local councils called the Citizens' Representatives Khural. After each election, the newly elected local councils recommend a governor and their office, and meet semi-annually to discuss issues in their province, recommend, and supervise the local government. However, the prime minister has the power to choose provincial and municipal governors. Unlike federal republics like Germany and the United States, local governments in Mongolia hold limited authority, and are generally tasked with implementing the central government's policies.

On the next lower administrative level, representatives are elected to councils of provincial subdivisions and urban sub-districts in Ulaanbaatar.

The latest local elections took place on 11 October 2024. A total of 17149 candidates ran for 8167 seats in provincial and county councils. The Mongolian People's Party won a majority in 14 out of 21 provincial councils in Mongolia, while the Democratic Party took the remaining seven provinces.

Provincial councils
Council	Available seats	MPP	DP	HUN	Independent
Ulaanbaatar	45	40	5		
Arkhangai	41	28	12	1	
Bayan-Ölgii	41	18	23		
Bayankhongor	35	23	12		
Bulgan	29	15	14		
Govi-Altai	29	11	18		
Govisümber	25	21	4		
Darkhan-Uul	41	24	16		1
Dornogovi	35	27	8		
Dornod	35	20	14	1	
Dundgovi	25	16	9		
Zavkhan	35	19	15		1
Orkhon	41	21	20		
Övörkhangai	41	29	12		
Ömnögovi	35	13	21		1
Sükhbaatar	29	9	20		
Selenge	41	21	19	1	
Töv	41	20	21		
Uvs	35	18	15		2
Khovd	41	14	27		
Khövsgöl	41	26	15		
Khentii	35	17	18		

== See also ==
- Constitution of Mongolia
- Government of Mongolia
- Foreign relations of Mongolia
- Flag of Mongolia
