= Monnaran Solar Power Plant =

Photovoltaic power plant in Songino Khairkhan, Ulaanbaatar, Mongolia

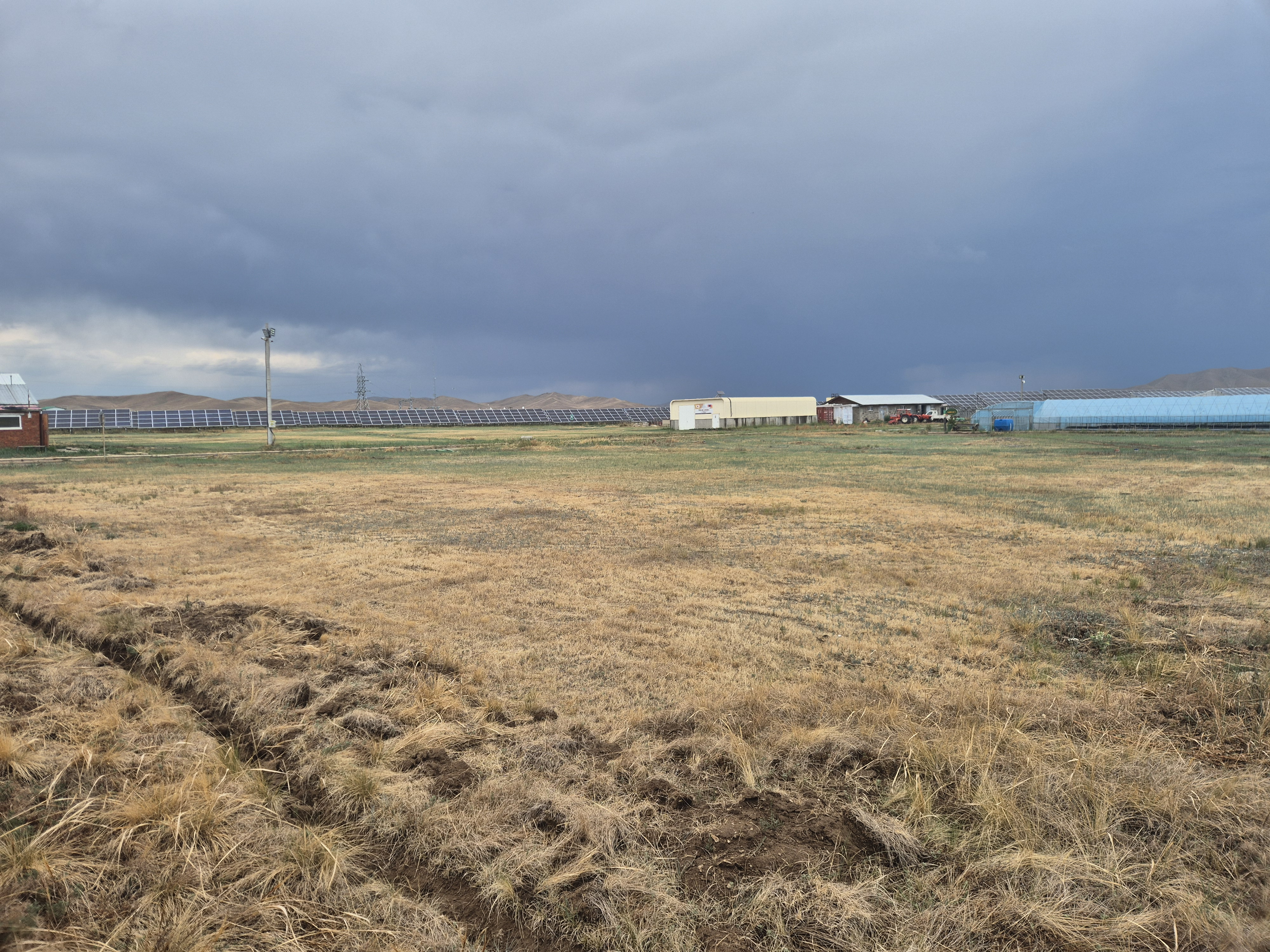
- Official name: Моннаран Нарны Цахилгаан Станц
- Country: Mongolia
- Location: Songino Khairkhan, Ulaanbaatar
- Coordinates: 48°01′54.4″N 106°30′49.6″E
- Status: Operational
- Construction began: 2015
- Commission date: 25 November 2017
- Construction cost: US$23 million

Solar farm
- Type: Standard PV
- Site area: 13 hectares

Power generation
- Nameplate capacity: 10 MW

The Monnaran 10MW Solar Power Plant (Mongolian: Моннаран Нарны Цахилгаан Станц) is a photovoltaic power station in Songino Khairkhan, Ulaanbaatar, Mongolia. It was constructed together on top of greenhouse.

== History ==
The construction of the power plant started in 2015. It was then commissioned on 25 November 2017 during a ceremony attended by Foreign Minister D. Tsogtbaatar.

The power plant was constructed with a cost of US$23 million. Part of the funds were provided by the Japan Bank for International Cooperation. It was constructed by Everyday Farm LLC.

== Technical specifications ==
The power plant consists of 46,848 photovoltaic panels with a total installed capacity of 10 MW. Included in the project were the construction of the 20-km of overhead line and the expansion of Bayanchandmani substation. The area includes 20 greenhouses which were built on 13 hectares of land in which the PV panels were installed on top of the greenhouse buildings.

== See also ==
- List of power stations in Mongolia
