= New Central Wastewater Treatment Plant =

Wastewater treatment plant in Songino Khairkhan, Ulaanbaatar, Mongolia

- Төв цэвэрлэх байгууламж
- Interactive map of the New Central Wastewater Treatment Plant area

General information
- Type: wastewater treatment plant
- Location: Songino Khairkhan, Ulaanbaatar, Mongolia
- Coordinates: 47°54′09″N 106°45′45″E
- Groundbreaking: 28 February 2019
- Cost: US$262.7 million

Technical details
- Grounds: 17.7 hectares

The New Central Wastewater Treatment Plant (Mongolian: Төв цэвэрлэх байгууламж) is a wastewater treatment plant under construction in Songino Khairkhan District, Ulaanbaatar, Mongolia.

== History ==
The feasibility study to establish the plant was done in 2015. The construction of the plant was officiated on 2 February 2019 and constructed officially started on 28 February 2019 in a groundbreaking ceremony officiated by Prime Minister Ukhnaagiin Khürelsükh. On 31 March 2022, concrete started to be poured into the inner walls of the plant three reaction tanks. In July 2025, the plant received its first trial inflow of.

== Architecture ==
The plant is constructed in a 17.7 hectares of land. There are 35 buildings being constructed at the plant site.

== Technical specifications ==
Once completed, the plant will have a processing capacity of 250,000 m^{3} of wastewater per day.

== Finance ==
The plant costs US$262.7 million which was financed by a loan provided by the Government of China to the Government of Mongolia.

== See also ==
- Environmental issues in Mongolia
