= Songino Battery Storage Power Station =

Battery storage power station in Baganuur, Ulaanbaatar, Mongolia

- Official name: Сонгино Батарей Хуримтлуурын Станц
- Country: Mongolia
- Location: Songino Khairkhan, Ulaanbaatar
- Coordinates: 47°51′53.0″N 106°36′14.5″E
- Status: Operational
- Construction began: August 2022
- Commission date: December 2023
- Construction cost: US$80.9 million
- Site area: 16 hectares

Power generation
- Nameplate capacity: 80 MW
- Storage capacity: 200 MWh

The Songino Battery Storage Power Station (Mongolian: Сонгино Батарей Хуримтлуурын Станц) is a battery storage power station in Songino Khairkhan, Ulaanbaatar, Mongolia.

== History ==
The consultant for the project was awarded to RWE Technology International GmbH in June 2021. The contract with the contractor to construct the power station was signed on 6 July 2022. The first payment for the project was made by the Asian Development Bank (ADB) on 13 September 2022.

The groundbreaking ceremony for the construction of the power station was held in August 2022 attended by Prime Minister Luvsannamsrain Oyun-Erdene and the Minister of Energy. The earthworks for the power station commenced in April 2023 and the power station was commissioned in December 2023. The remaining civil works commenced on 1 April 2024 and completed by September 2024.

== Technical specifications ==
The power station has an installed electricity generation capacity of 80 MW. It produces 200 MWh of electricity annually. The power station supplies electricity to the central energy system of the national grid. The power station is interconnected with the 220/110/35 kV Songino substation.

== Architecture ==
The power station complex spans over an area of 16 hectares. It consists of seven sections, which are the control room building, two 100 MWh transformers, 35 kV indoor switchgear and 32 cold storage facilities with 64 containers. It is equipped with pump station for firefighting with underground pipes, outdoor hydrants and drainage system. It is also equipped with parking area, lighting towers and paved roads for maintenance.

== Finance ==
The power station was constructed with a cost of US$80.9 million. It was funded through soft loan by the ADB. It was also supported by the Government of Mongolia by granting the project various tax exemptions.

== Management ==
The power station was constructed by Jiangsu Zhongtian Technology Co., Ltd (ZTT) and Zhongtian Energy Storage Technology Co., Ltd (ZEST) from China. The consultant for the project was RWE Technology International GmbH from Germany.

== See also ==
- List of power stations in Mongolia
