= Songino Khairkhan =

District in Ulaanbaatar, Mongolia

Songino Khairkhan District Сонгинохайрхан дүүрэг ᠰᠣᠩᠭᠢᠨ᠎ᠠᠬᠠᠶᠢᠷᠬᠠᠨᠲᠡᠭᠦᠷᠭᠡ
- Municipal District
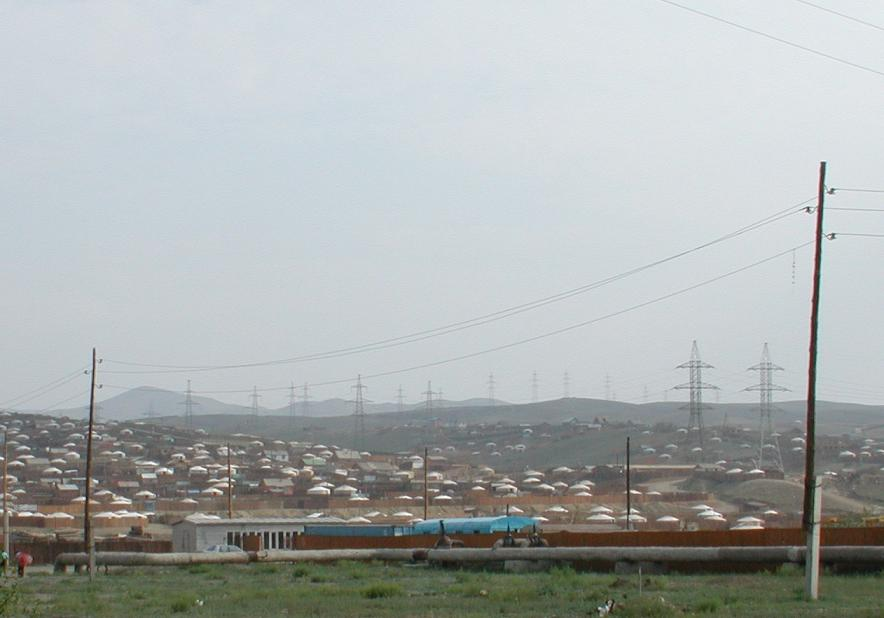
- Songino Khairkhan, 2003

- Flag Coat of arms

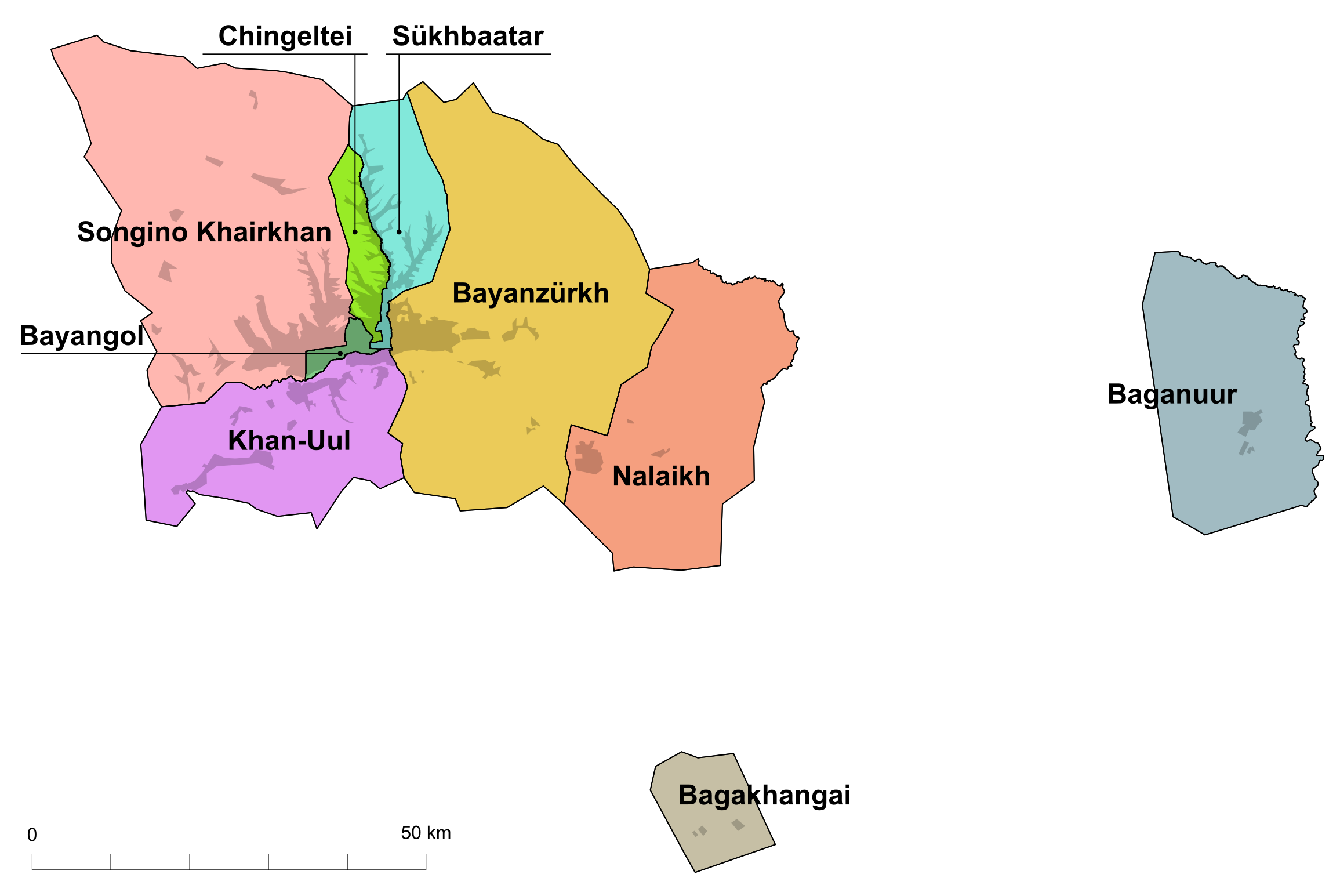
- Songino Khairkhan in Ulaanbaatar
- Interactive map of Songino Khairkhan District
- Country: Mongolia
- Municipality: Ulaanbaatar
- Oktyabr raion of Ulaanbaatar: 1965
- Reorganized as district: 1992

Government
  - Body: Citizens' Representatives Khural of the Songino khairkhan district
  - Governor of District: N.Altanshagai, MPP

Area
  - Total: 1,200.6 km^{2} (463.6 sq mi)

Population (January 1, 2024)
  - Total: 341,390
  - Density: 284.35/km^{2} (736.46/sq mi)
- Time zone: UTC+8 (UTC + 8)

Songino Khairkhan (Mongolian: Сонгинохайрхан [sɔ́ŋgɪɴ‿χɛ́rχəɴ]) is one of nine districts of the Mongolian capital of Ulaanbaatar. It is divided into 43 subdistricts. It is located in Ulaanbaatar's westernmost region, and encompasses one of the city's four largest mountains — the Songinokhairkhan Uul.

== Administrative divisions ==
The district consists of 43 khoroos.

== Economy ==
The majority sector of employment in the district are construction (35%), wholesale and retail (22%) and manufacturing (15%).

== Demographics ==
As of March 2022, the district recorded a population of 335,554 people living across 89,725 households.

== Infrastructure ==
- Monnaran Solar Power Plant
- New Central Wastewater Treatment Plant
- Songino Battery Storage Power Station
- Ulaanchuluut Landfill
