= List of political parties in Mongolia =

This article lists political parties in Mongolia. Mongolia has had a multi-party system since the 1990 Democratic Revolution. Prior to the democratic transition, the country was a one-party state throughout the 20th century. Mongolian politics is currently dominated by two major political parties: the Mongolian People's Party, established in 1921, and the Democratic Party, established in 2000 but dates its roots back to 1990.

According to the Law on Political Parties, first passed in 1990, then revised in 2005 and later in 2023, a political party is considered as a union of Mongolian citizens who have consolidated voluntarily with the purpose of organizing social, personal, and political activities as stated in the Constitution of Mongolia. Political parties must be registered by the Supreme Court of Mongolia.

The Mongolian People's Party (MPP) – known as the Mongolian People's Revolutionary Party (MPRP) between 1924 and 2010 – governed the country from 1921 to 1996 (in a socialist one-party system until 1990). After the 1990 revolution and the fall of the Soviet Union, the then-ruling MPRP transitioned into a democratic socialist party and maintained a high level of nationwide support, especially among rural voters. The party was out of power for the first time in 1996, when the opposition Democratic Union Coalition was elected with an overwhelming majority in the State Great Khural. However, after many political crises and unpopularity, the coalition lost much of its seats to the MPRP in 2000. Subsequently, the centre-right Democratic Party (DP) was founded in 2000 through the merger of five parties and became the primary opposition to the MPRP up until 2004, when it became an almost-equal coalition partner to the MPRP. The DP became the dominant political force between 2012 to 2016, when it held the presidency, prime ministership, and speakership.

In late 2010, the MPRP changed its name to the Mongolian People's Party (MPP) along with an ideological shift towards social democracy; however, former president Nambaryn Enkhbayar's faction and other conservative members departed from the party and created a new party taking the original name, Mongolian People's Revolutionary Party. The splinter MPRP became the primary third-party force from 2010 to 2021, when it merged with the MPP during its 100th year anniversary.

The now-renamed MPP won a landslide victory in the 2016 election and another one in the 2020 election. In late 2018, a major corruption scandal involving SMEs occurred along with an alleged conspiracy of a duopoly amplified by social media. Consequently, mass anti-government protests erupted, which led to a significant increase in public distrust for the political establishment. The Right Person Electorate Coalition, led by the National Labour Party (NLP), won several seats both in the State Great Khural and municipal councils. In the 2021 presidential election, the NLP candidate received 21% of the vote, outperforming the Democratic candidate, who won 9%. The NLP changed its name to the HUN Party in 2022.

Electoral reforms in 2023 allowed minor parties to be more represented in parliament via proportional representation. Consequently, the MPP's parliamentary supermajority was reduced to a slim majority in the 2024 elections, allowing the DP and three other parties to make up almost half of the now-expanded State Great Khural. The current ninth legislature of the State Great Khural has been the most politically diverse and the first five-party parliament to be ever convened in Mongolia.

As of 22 August 2026, there are 30 political parties officially registered by the Supreme Court. However, critics argue that there are no significant ideological differences between the political parties on issues such as economic policies and governance.

== Current parties ==
=== Parties represented in the State Great Khural ===
Party	Abbr.	Founded	Party leader	Position	Ideology	MPs	Provincial & Capital legislators	District & county legislators
Mongolian People's Party; Монгол Ардын Нам; Mongol Ardīn Nam	MPP; МАН	1920	Nyam-Osoryn Uchral	Centre-left	Social democracy	68 / 126	450 / 796	3,925 / 7,235
Democratic Party; Ардчилсан Нам; Ardchilsan Nam	DP; АН	2000	Odongiin Tsogtgerel	Centre-right	Mongolian nationalism; Liberal conservatism; Economic liberalism	42 / 126	338 / 796	3,185 / 7,235
HUN Party; ХҮН Нам; KHÜN Nam	HUN; ХҮН	2011	Togmidyn Dorjkhand	Centre-right	Liberalism; Pragmatism	7 / 126	3 / 796	5 / 7,235
Civil Will–Green Party; Иргэний Зориг–Ногоон Нам; Irgenii Zorig–Nogoon Nam	IZNN; ИЗНН	2012	Batyn Batbaatar	Centre	Green liberalism	4 / 126	0 / 796	4 / 7,235
National Coalition; Үндэсний Эвсэл; Ündesnii Evsel	NC; ҮЭ	2024	Nyamtaishiryn Nomtoibayar	Centre to centre-right	Big tent	4 / 126	0 / 796	5 / 7,235

=== Parties with local representation ===
Party	Abbr.	Founded	Party leader	Position	Ideology	Provincial & Capital legislators	District & county legislators
Civil Movement Party; Иргэний Хөдөлгөөний Нам; Irgenii Khödölgöönii Nam	CMP; ИХН		Ulziibatyn Bayaraa	Centre-right	Mongolian nationalism	0 / 796	23 / 7,235
The Civic Unity Party; Иргэдийн Оролцооны Нэгдэл Нам; Irgediin Oroltsoony Negdel Nam	CUP; ИОНН		Tsedevdambyn Oyungerel	Centre-right	Economic liberalism	0 / 796	1 / 7,235
Truth and Right Party; Үнэн ба Зөв Нам; Ünen ba Zöv Nam	TRP; ҮБЗН		Ayurzanyn Otgonbaatar	Centre-left to centre	Social democracy	0 / 796	1 / 7,235

=== Extra-parliamentary parties ===
- Mongolian Traditional United Party (Mongolyn Ulamjlalyn Negdsen Nam)
- Mongolian Liberal Democratic Party (Mongolyn Liberal Ardchilsan Nam)
- Motherland Party (Ekh Oron Nam)
- Republican Party (Bügd Nairamdakh Nam)
- Mongolian Social Democratic Party (Mongolyn Sotsial Demokrat Nam)
- Freedom Implementing Party (Erkhchölöög Kheregjüülegch Nam)
- Development Program Party (Khögjliin Khötölbör Nam)
- Mongolian Democratic Movement Party (Mongolyn Ardchilsan Khödölgöönii Nam)
- United Patriots Party (Ekh Oronchdyn Negdsen Nam)
- Mongol Conservative Party (Mongol Konservativ Nam)
- Independence and Unity Party (Tusgaar Togtnol, Ev Negdliin Nam)
- People's Power Party (Ard Tümnii Khüch Nam)
- For the Mongolian People Party (Mongolyn Khünii Tölöö Nam)
- Liberté party (Erkh Chölöönii Evsel Nam)
- World Mongols Party (Delkhiin Mongolchuud Nam)
- People's Majority Governance Party (Ard Tümnii Olonkhiin Zasaglal Nam)
- Great Harmony Party (Ikh Ev Nam)
- Ger Area Development Party (Ger Khoroolol Khögjliin Nam)
- My Mongolia Party (Minii Mongol Nam)
- Good Democratic Citizens United Party (Sain Ardchilsan Irgediin Negdsen Nam)
- Libertarian Party (Libertari Nam)

== Defunct parties ==
=== In the 1990s ===
==== Mongolian National Democratic Party ====
- Mongolian Democratic Party (1990) (MDP) — merged into the Mongolian National Democratic Party
- Mongolian National Progress Party (MNPP) — merged into the Mongolian National Democratic Party
- Mongolian United Party — merged into the Mongolian National Democratic Party
- Mongolian Renaissance Party — merged into the Mongolian National Democratic Party

==== Democratic Party of Mongolia ====
- Mongolian National Democratic Party (1992–2000) (MNDP) — merged into the Democratic Party
- Mongolian Democratic Renaissance Party (MDRP) — merged into the Democratic Party
- Mongolian Religious Democratic Party (MRDP) — merged into the Democratic Party

==== Mongolian Traditional United Party ====
- Mongolian Party for Independence — merged into the Mongolian Traditional United Party
- Mongolian United Party of Pastoralists and Farmers — merged into the Mongolian Traditional United Party
- Mongolian United Party of Private Owners — merged into the Mongolian Traditional United Party

=== In the 2000s ===
- Civil Will–Republican Party — short-lived merger of the Civil Will Party and the Republican Party
- Mongolian National Unity Party — merged into the Civil Will Party

=== In the 2010s ===
- Civil Will Party (CWP) — merged into the Civil Will–Green Party

=== In the 2020s ===
- Mongolian People's Revolutionary Party (MPRP) — merged into the Mongolian People's Party
- NEW Party — deregistered by the Supreme Court for inactivity

== See also ==
- Politics of Mongolia
- List of political parties by country
- History of modern Mongolia
- Elections in Mongolia
