= Women in the Mongolian Parliament =

Women's representation in Mongolian Parliament, the State Great Khural, has constantly increased over the years since the country's democratic election in 1992. 17.1% (13 out of 76 seats) of the parliament are female as of 2016, which is the highest among seven parliamentary elections in Mongolia. However, it is still lower than the regional average of 19.7% and the world average of 23.4%. According to the Inter-Parliamentary Union, Mongolia ranks at 115th together with Gabon (193 countries are classified by descending order of the percentage of women in the lower or single house).

Mongolian female MPs have a tradition of working under an unofficial parliamentary group. Elected female members in 2016 (12 of 13 female MPs are from MPP and one is from DP) agreed to unofficially work as a team on social security issues related to children, women and families.

== Records ==
Election year	Number of seats	Number of women	% of female seats in Parliament	Female candidates	% of female candidates
1973	336	77	22.91
1977	354	82	23.16
1981	370	90	24.32
1986	370	92	24.86
1990	430	9	2.09
1992	76	3	3.94
1996	76	9	7.89
2000	76	8	10.52
2004	76	5	6.57	40	16.4%
2008	76	3	3.94	66	18.5%
2012	76	10	14.9	174	32.0%
2016	76	13	17.1	129	25.9%
2020	76	13	17.1	151	24.9%
2024	126	32	25.4	519	38.8%

== Legal basis ==
Article 126 of the Law on Election sets a quota for women candidacy. The revised electoral law obliges parties to include at least 20 per cent of women candidates.

Article 126.2 states that at least 20 percent of candidates nominated by a party or coalition shall be represented by one gender. This article was amended on May 5, 2016, by law.

== Current representation ==
In the 2020 parliamentary election, a total of 13 women parliamentarians were elected, and four were re-elected from the previous election.

Female Parliamentarians 2020-2024 of Mongolia
#	Name	Party affiliation	Constituency
1	Anujin Purev-Ochir	Mongolian People's Party	Songino Khairkhan
2	Adiyasuren Amgalan	Democratic Party	Bayankhongor Province
3	Bayarsaikhan Baljinnyam	Mongolian People's Party	Zavkhan Province
4	Bulgantuya Khurelbaatar	Mongolian People's Party	Bayanzürkh
5	Jargalmaa Badarch	Mongolian People's Party	Songino Khairkhan
6	Munkhtsetseg Gompildoo	Mongolian People's Party	Dundgovi Province
7	Munkhtsetseg Tserenjamts	Mongolian People's Party	Sükhbaatar
8	Odontuya Saldan	Democratic Party	Bayangol
9	Oyunchimeg Munkhuu	Mongolian People's Party	Chingeltei
10	Sarangerel Davaajantsan	Mongolian People's Party	Khan-Uul
11	Saranchimeg Batsukh	Mongolian People's Party	Bayanzürkh
12	Undram Chinbat	Mongolian People's Party	Selenge Province
13	Unurbolor Damdinsuren	Mongolian People's Party	Selenge Province

== Historic representation ==
=== 2016 election ===
In the 2016 parliamentary election, 13 women were elected from 151 women candidates (25.9 percent of the total candidates), representing 49 constituencies from 76 constituencies.

Before the 2016 election, the parliamentary law reduced the women quota from 30 percent to 20 percent and moved from proportional representation to the majoritarian system.

A total of 12 political parties and 3 coalitions all obliged the 20 percent of the women quota. Although all parties and coalition nominated more than the quota on women candidates, the main two parties, the Mongolian People's Party and Democratic Party, all 13 women parliamentarians were from either party.

Female Parliamentarians 2016-2020 of Mongolia
#	Name	Party affiliation	Constituency
1	Amarzaya Namsrai	Mongolian People's Party	Ömnögovi Province
2	Bilegt Magvan	Mongolian People's Party	Bayankhongor Province
3	Garamjav Tseden	Mongolian People's Party	Songino Khairkhan
4	Munkhtsetseg Gompildoo	Mongolian People's Party	Dornogovi and Govisumber Province
5	Narantuya Zagdkhuu	Democratic Party	Zavkhan Province
6	Oyunchimeg Munkhuu	Mongolian People's Party	Chingeltei
7	Oyundari Navaan-Yunden	Mongolian People's Party	Selenge Province
8	Oyunkhorol Dulamsuren	Mongolian People's Party	Bayanzürkh
9	Saranchimeg Batsukh	Mongolian People's Party	Bayanzürkh
10	Sarangerel Davaajantsan	Mongolian People's Party	Khan-Uul
11	Tsogzolmaa Tsedenbal	Mongolian People's Party	Sükhbaatar
12	Undraa Agvaanluvsan	Mongolian People's Party	Bayangol
13	Undarmaa Batbayar	Mongolian People's Party	Songino Khairkhan

=== 2012 election ===
The election law was amended at the end of 2011 moved from majoritarian system to a "mixed member proportional system" with the quota of 20% for women candidates.

In the 2012 parliamentary election, a total of 10 women parliamentarians were elected from 174 female candidates in the election, representing 32% (highest number of candidates) of the total candidates.

Female Parliamentarians 2012-2016 of Mongolia
#	Name	Party affiliation
1	Oyunkhorol Dulamsuren	Mongolian People's Party
2	Uyanga Gantumur	Justice Coalition
3	Oyungerel Tsedevdamba	Democratic Party
4	Erdenechimeg Luvsan	Democratic Party
5	Odontuya Saldan	Democratic Party
6	Batchimeg Migeddorj	Democratic Party
7	Bayanselenge Zangad	Justice Coalition
8	Oyun Sanjaasuren	Civil Will–Green Party
9	Burmaa Radnaa	Democratic Party
10	Saranchimeg Batsukh	Mongolian People's Party

=== 2008 election ===
The number reduced to only 3 women parliamentarians, 4% of the total parliament.

The Mongolian People's Revolutionary Party (MPRP) changed its name to Mongolian People's Party (MPP) in 2010.

Female Parliamentarians 2008-2012 of Mongolia
#	Name	Party affiliation
1	Arvin Dashjamts	Mongolian Revolutionary People's Party
2	Oyun Sanjaasuren	Civil Will–Green Party
3	Oyunkhorol Dulamsuren	Mongolian Revolutionary People's Party

=== 2004 election ===
During the 2004 parliamentary election, only 5 women were elected out of 40 candidates, 16.4% of the total candidates.

Female Parliamentarians 2004-2008 of Mongolia
#	Name	Party affiliation
1	Arvin Dashjamts	Mongolian Revolutionary People's Party
2	Gandhi Tugsjargal	Mongolian Revolutionary People's Party
3	Munkhtuya Budee	Motherland Democratic Coalition
4	Oyun Sanjaasuren	Civil Will–Green Party
5	Tuya Danzandarjaa	Motherland Democratic Coalition

=== 2000 election ===
In the 2000 parliamentary election, 8 women from the MPRP and Oyun Sanjaasuren from the Civil Will Party-Mongolian Green Party were elected to the parliament.

Female Parliamentarians 2000-2004 of Mongolia
#	Name	Party affiliation
1	Altai Dulbaa	Mongolian Revolutionary People's Party
2	Arvin Dashjamts	Mongolian Revolutionary People's Party
3	Bolormaa Nordov	Mongolian Revolutionary People's Party
4	Dolgor Badraa	Mongolian Revolutionary People's Party
5	Gandhi Tugsjargal	Mongolian Revolutionary People's Party
6	Gerelsuren Nansaljav	Mongolian Revolutionary People's Party
7	Oyun Sanjaasuren	Civil Will Party-Mongolian Green Party
8	Oyunkhorol Dulamsuren	Mongolian Revolutionary People's Party
9	Tuya Danzandarjaa	Mongolian Revolutionary People's Party

=== 1996 election ===
There were 8 women parliamentarian members from 1996 to 2000.

When the Zorig Sanjaasuren was murdered in 1998, his sister, Oyun Sanjaasuren, entered politics and won the by-election in her brother's constituency.

Enkhtuya Oidov established a women parliamentarians committee and started initiatives to work closely with women civil society organisations.

Female Parliamentarians 1996-2000 of Mongolia
#	Name	Party affiliation
1	Arvin Dashjamts	Mongolian Revolutionary People's Party
2	Enkhtuya Oidov	Democratic Union Coalition
3	Gandhi Tugsjargal	Mongolian Revolutionary People's Party
4	Khulan Khasbat	Mongolian Revolutionary People's Party
5	Narangerel Rinchen	Democratic Union Coalition
6	Narantsetseg Unenburen	Democratic Union Coalition
7	Otgonbayar Chultem	Democratic Union Coalition
8	Oyun Sanjaasuren	Democratic Union Coalition

=== 1992 election ===
In the 1992 parliamentary election, a total of 9 parties and one coalition joined the election. One of the women parliamentarians, Byambajav Janlav, left the parliament to join the Supreme Court of Mongolia, the highest court in Mongolia, in 1995 before her term ended.

Female Parliamentarians 1992-1996 of Mongolia
#	Name	Party affiliation
1	Munkhuu Dorj	Mongolian Revolutionary People's Party
2	Gandhi Tugsjargal	Mongolian Revolutionary People's Party
3	Byambajav Janlav	Mongolian Revolutionary People's Party
