= 2020 Mongolian parliamentary election =

- 24 June 2020
- All 76 seats in the State Great Khural; 39 seats needed for a majority
- Turnout: 73.64% (▲0.71pp)
| Party | Leader | Vote % | Seats | +/– |
|---|---|---|---|---|
| MPP | Ukhnaagiin Khürelsükh | 44.98 | 62 | −3 |
| Democratic | Sodnomzunduin Erdene | 24.49 | 11 | +2 |
| Our Coalition | Nambaryn Enkhbayar | 8.08 | 1 | 0 |
| RPEC | Badrakhyn Naidalaa | 5.24 | 1 | New |
| Independents | – | 8.79 | 1 | 0 |
This lists parties that won seats. See the complete results below.
Results by constituency
| Prime Minister before | Prime Minister after |
|---|---|
| Ukhnaagiin Khürelsükh; MPP | Ukhnaagiin Khürelsükh; MPP |

Parliamentary elections were held in Mongolia on 24 June 2020. The result was a landslide victory for the ruling Mongolian People's Party (MPP), which won 62 of the 76 seats, a slight decrease from the 65 it won in the 2016 parliamentary elections. The main opposition Democratic Party won 11 out 76 seats, gaining only 2 seats. Two electoral coalitions, the Our Coalition and the Right Person Electorate Coalition, each won a single parliamentary seat.

With a turnout of 73%, slightly higher than the last election, the parliamentary elections were held under strict public safety and hygiene measures during the early stages of the COVID-19 pandemic. The convening State Great Khural re-appointed incumbent prime minister and MPP chairman Ukhnaagiin Khürelsükh to a second term on 2 July 2020.

== Background ==
Mongolia experienced an economic decline and commodity price shocks starting from 2013. Foreign direct investment recovered starting from 2015 but by 2016, the economic forecast of Mongolia's growth by the IMF was just at 0.4% compared to 17.5% in 2011.

In the 2016 parliamentary election, then-opposition Mongolian People's Party won a landslide victory, outperforming the governing Democratic Party (DP) by 56 seats, despite only 12% total constituency vote difference. The DP's previous plurality of 34 seats was reduced to 9 seats. MPP chairman Miyeegombyn Enkhbold was elected the parliamentary speaker and MPP lawmaker Jargaltulgyn Erdenebat was appointed the Prime Minister of Mongolia in July 2016.

In the 2017 presidential election, Mongolia's first presidential run-off was held after no candidates received the majority vote. The nominee of the Mongolian People's Revolutionary Party, Sainkhüügiin Ganbaatar came in third with only a thousand-vote difference. Despite record high protest votes, the DP presidential candidate, Khaltmaagiin Battulga, defeated the MPP candidate and speaker, Miyeegombyn Enkhbold, with a 9.4% lead.

Following the MPP's defeat, infighting between the factions led by chairman Enkhbold and rising figure Ukhnaagiin Khürelsükh occurred in the subsequent months. Prime minister Erdenebat was ousted (42–31) from office in September 2017. He was succeeded by deputy prime minister Khürelsükh in October 2017. A series of mass demonstrations occurred in December 2018, after the unravelling of a landmark 2018 SME loan scandal, in which 14 parliamentarians, 2 cabinet ministers, 1 deputy minister and several high officials were involved. The protestors called for the resignation of speaker Enkhbold, who was accused of corruption and abuse of power.

The mass protests coincited with a major factional infighting within the governing MPP and subsequent political gridlock since November 2018. A series of political maneuvers led to a failed motion of no confidence in November and dismissal of several MPP officials in December. Enkhbold was dismissed as speaker by the State Great Khural on 29 January 2019, forcing him to retire from politics. He was succeeded by Gombojavyn Zandanshatar on 1 February 2019.

A legislation allowing president Battulga to dismiss corrupt judges based on the suggestions of the National Security Council, a body chaired by the president, was passed in March 2019. The dismissal of justices, prosecutors and anti-corruption chiefs by the president in March and June caused a constitutional crisis in 2019. Major constitutional amendments, which empowered the prime minister and judicial independence, were drafted and passed by two-thirds of parliament in November 2019.

=== COVID-19 pandemic ===
On 27 January 2020, the Government of Mongolia closed its border with China and all schools following the WHO reports on coronavirus. Multiple holidays, including Tsagaan Sar and Naadam, were cancelled by the government. The COVID-19 pandemic was confirmed to have reached the country when its first case was identified in a French man who traveled from Moscow to Dornogovi on 10 March 2020.

== Electoral system ==
The 76 members of the State Great Khural were elected by plurality-at-large voting in multi-member constituencies (of two to four seats each). The electoral system was not decided until a new electoral law was passed on 22 December 2019. The changes were expected to marginalise smaller parties, and also effectively removed the right of 150,000 Mongolian expatriates to vote, as they could not be registered in a specific constituency. The new electoral law also barred people found guilty of "corrupt practices" from standing in elections. A proposal to re-introduce mixed proportional system did not garner enough support to pass into law.

Women's right activists called for raising gender quota for nominations from 20% to 30% but they failed. Until the 2024 elections, female MPs made up 17% (13 seats) in the parliament, the highest number since the first democratic elections in 1990.

== Political parties ==
=== Parliamentary parties ===
In the 2016 parliamentary election, three political parties and one independent were elected to the State Great Khural. By June 2020, the outgoing parliament consisted of three parties—the Mongolian People's Party, the Democratic Party, and the Citizens' Coalition for Justice Party; the latter party was formed by two lawmakers in 2019. The Mongolian People's Revolutionary Party lost its only seat to the Democratic Party in 2017. Three members of parliament from the MPP were relieved from their duties, thereby three seats remained vacant.

| Name | | Party leader | Floor leader | Ideology | Position | 2016 election | | At dissolution |
| Name | | Party leader | Floor leader | Ideology | Position | Votes (%) | Seats | At dissolution |
|---|---|---|---|---|---|---|---|---|
| MPP | Mongolian People's Party | Ukhnaagiin Khürelsükh | Dulamdorjiin Togtokhsüren | Social democracy | Centre-left | 45.1% | 65 / 76 | 62 / 76 |
| DP | Democratic Party | Sodnomzunduin Erdene | Dondogdorjiin Erdenebat | Liberal conservatism | Centre-right | 33.1% | 9 / 76 | 9 / 76 |
| MPRP | Mongolian People's Revolutionary Party | Nambaryn Enkhbayar | | Left-wing populism | Centre-left | 8.0% | 1 / 76 | 0 / 76 |
| NEW | Citizens' Coalition for Justice Party | Jalbasürengiin Batzandan | | Populism | Centre-right | — | 0 / 76 | 2 / 76 |

=== Contesting parties ===
606 candidates were officially registered by the General Election Commission of Mongolia for the election, of whom 121 were independents and 485 were from the following 13 political parties and 4 coalitions:

| Party or coalition | | Total |
|---|---|---|
| Mongolian People's Party | | 76 |
| Democratic Party | | 76 |
| Mongolian Green Party | | 15 |
| Our Coalition | Mongolian People's Revolutionary Party | 74 |
| Our Coalition | Civil Will–Green Party | 74 |
| Our Coalition | Mongolian Traditional United Party | 74 |
| New Coalition | Citizens' Coalition for Justice Party | 72 |
| New Coalition | Republican Party | 72 |
| New Coalition | Truth and Right Party | 72 |
| New Coalition | Mongolian National Democratic Party | 72 |
| Right Person Electorate Coalition | National Labour Party | 53 |
| Right Person Electorate Coalition | Mongolian Social Democratic Party | 53 |
| Right Person Electorate Coalition | Justice Party | 53 |
| People's Party | | 1 |
| Freedom Implementing Party | | 13 |
| Development Program Party | | 7 |
| United Patriots Party | | 1 |
| Keep Order! Constitution 19 Coalition | Mongol Conservative Party | 34 |
| Keep Order! Constitution 19 Coalition | For the Mongolian People Party | 34 |
| Love the People Party | | 1 |
| Demos Party | | 30 |
| World Mongols Party | | 3 |
| People's Majority Governance Party | | 24 |
| Great Harmony Party | | 1 |
| Ger Area Development Party | | 4 |
| Independent | | 121 |
| Total | | 606 |

Multiple candidates were arrested during the election campaign. Among them, two were running on the governing MPP's ticket, three were candidates of the opposition DP and one was a candidate of the Keep Order! Constitution 19 Coalition.

=== Lawmakers not standing for re-election ===
| MP | Seat | First elected | Party |
|---|---|---|---|
| Gombojain Soltan | Bayan-Ölgii | 2016 | MPP |
| Magvany Bilegt | Bayankhongor | 2016 | MPP |
| Yadamsürengiin Sanjmyatav | Zavkhan | 2004 | DP |
| Yangugiin Sodbaatar | Övörkhangai | 2012 | MPP |
| Namsrain Amarzayaa | Ömnögovi | 2016 | MPP |
| Luvsangiin Enkhbold | Ömnögovi | 2016 | MPP |
| Chültemiin Ulaan | Sükhbaatar | 1996 | MPP |
| Navaan-Yundengiin Oyundari | Selenge | 2016 | MPP |
| Miyeegombyn Enkhbold | Töv | 2005 | MPP |
| Agvaansamdangiin Sükhbat | Töv | 2016 | MPP |
| Damdiny Khayankhyarvaa | Darkhan-Uul | 2008 | MPP |
| Otgonbilegiin Sodbileg | Orkhon | 2012 | MPP |
| Dorjdambyn Damba-Ochir | Orkhon | 2016 | MPP |
| Dulamsürengiin Oyuunkhorol | Bayanzürkh | 2000 | MPP |
| Jadambyn Enkhbayar | Bayanzürkh | 2008 | MPP |
| Ölziisaikhany Enkhtüvshin | Chingeltei / Nalaikh | 2000 | MPP |
| Davaagiin Ganbold | Chingeltei / Nalaikh | 2016 | MPP |
| Agvaanluvsangiin Undraa | Bayangol | 2016 | MPP |
| Tsedengiin Garamjav | Songinokhairkhan | 2016 | MPP |
| Dendeviin Terbishdagva | Songinokhairkhan | 2004 | MPP |
| Batbayaryn Undarmaa | Songinokhairkhan | 2016 | MPP |

== Opinion polls ==
| Polling firm | Fieldwork date | Sample size | MPP | DP | MPRP | CWGP | NEW | RP | MNDP | Truth and Right | NLP | Other | Ind. | None | Und./NA/ DK |
|---|---|---|---|---|---|---|---|---|---|---|---|---|---|---|---|
| Sant Maral | 10–30 Mar 2017 | 1,200 | 31.6 | 18.1 | 5.2 | – | – | – | – | – | – | 0.7 | – | – | 43.5 |
| MEC | 17–19 May 2017 | 980 | 15.0 | 22.0 | 12.0 | – | – | – | – | – | – | 5.0 | – | – | 46.0 |
| MEC | 28–30 Jul 2017 | 990 | 20.0 | 43.0 | 9.0 | – | – | – | – | – | – | – | – | – | 28.0 |
| MEC | Aug 2017 | – | 17.0 | 37.0 | 6.0 | – | – | – | – | – | – | – | – | – | 40.0 |
| MEC | Sep 2017 | – | 17.0 | 35.0 | 7.0 | – | – | – | – | – | – | – | – | – | 40.0 |
| MEC | Oct 2017 | – | 17.0 | 29.0 | 7.0 | – | – | – | – | – | – | – | – | – | 47.0 |
| MEC | Nov 2017 | – | 16.0 | 30.0 | 6.0 | – | – | – | – | – | – | – | – | – | 48.0 |
| MEC | Dec 2017 | – | 17.0 | 25.0 | 7.0 | – | – | – | – | – | – | – | – | – | 51.0 |
| MEC | Jan 2018 | – | 11.0 | 15.0 | 4.0 | – | – | – | – | – | – | – | – | – | 70.0 |
| MEC | Feb 2018 | – | 13.0 | 17.0 | 6.0 | – | – | – | – | – | – | – | – | – | 64.0 |
| MEC | Mar 2018 | – | 14.0 | 17.0 | 6.0 | – | – | – | – | – | – | – | – | – | 63.0 |
| Sant Maral | 15 Mar – 2 Apr 2018 | 1,200 | 17.7 | 18.9 | 7.3 | 0.7 | – | – | – | – | – | 1.0 | – | – | 54.4 |
| MEC | Apr 2018 | – | 15.0 | 18.0 | 7.0 | – | – | – | – | – | – | – | – | – | 60.0 |
| Policy Research Center | Apr 2018 | – | 14.8 | 20.4 | 7.1 | – | – | – | – | – | – | 4.6 | – | – | 53.2 |
| MEC | Jun 2018 | – | 14.0 | 16.0 | 7.0 | – | – | – | – | – | – | 4.0 | – | – | 59.0 |
| MEC | Sep 2018 | – | 16.0 | 18.0 | 7.0 | – | – | – | – | – | – | 3.0 | – | – | 48.0 |
| HHC | 10 Sep – 10 Dec 2018 | 16,000 | 15.5 | 19.3 | 3.9 | 0.6 | – | 3.0 | 0.3 | 9.9 | 2.8 | 0.2 | – | – | 44.4 |
| MEC | Oct 2018 | – | 16.0 | 17.0 | 6.0 | – | – | – | – | – | – | 5.0 | – | – | 56.0 |
| Policy Research Center | Oct 2018 | – | 16.9 | 17.3 | 4.2 | 0.1 | – | 0.3 | – | 0.5 | 0.1 | 1.8 | – | – | 58.9 |
| MEC | 13–14 Nov 2018 | 750 | 12.0 | 15.0 | 7.0 | – | – | – | – | – | – | 7.0 | – | – | 59.0 |
| Sant Maral | 20 Mar – 9 Apr 2019 | 1,200 | 14.7 | 11.4 | 8.5 | 0.5 | – | 1.0 | 0.1 | 2.3 | 0.1 | 0.1 | 4.7 | 5.7 | 51.0 |
| MEC | 7–18 Apr 2019 | 1,070 | 10.0 | 12.0 | 7.0 | – | – | – | – | – | – | 2.0 | – | – | 69.0 |
| Policy Research Center | April 2019 | – | 9.7 | 10.9 | 4.1 | 0.2 | – | 0.3 | – | 0.3 | 0.1 | 1.3 | – | – | 73.1 |
| | 6 June 2019 | Citizens' Coalition for Justice Party founded | | | | | | | | | | | | | |
| Mongolian Poll | 19–21 Sep 2019 | 1,200 | 15.1 | 18.8 | 5.0 | 0.7 | 0.7 | 0.5 | – | – | 1.1 | – | – | – | 58.1 |
| MEC | 10–18 Nov 2019 | 700 | 16.0 | 17.0 | 7.0 | – | – | – | – | – | – | 8.0 | – | – | 52.0 |
| | 23 March 2020 | Our Coalition formed between MPRP, CWGP and MTUP | | | | | | | | | | | | | |
| | 23 March 2020 | New Coalition established by NEW Party, RP, MNDP and Truth and Right Party | | | | | | | | | | | | | |
| Sant Maral | 1–19 May 2020 | 1,200 | 16.9 | 11.0 | 5.3 | | 3.3 | | | | 1.0 | 3.0 | 4.5 | 4.5 | 53.6 |
| 2020 election | 24 Jun 2020 | – | 44.9 | 24.5 | 8.1 | | 5.4 | | | | 5.2 | 3.2 | 8.7 | – | – |

== Results ==
The ruling Mongolian People's Party won with a supermajority of 62 seats, a slight drop from the 65 won in the prior elections. The centre-right Democratic Party won 11 seats. The candidate of Our Coalition, former State Great Khural member and vice chairperson of the Mongolian People's Revolutionary Party, Sainkhüügiin Ganbaatar, won a seat, as did the candidate of the Right Person Electorate Coalition, Togmidyn Dorjkhand. Former Prime Minister of Mongolia Norovyn Altankhuyag won one seat as an independent candidate.

| Party | Votes | % | Seats | +/– |
|---|---|---|---|---|
| Mongolian People's Party | 1,795,665 | 44.98 | 62 | –3 |
| Democratic Party | 977,680 | 24.49 | 11 | +2 |
| Our Coalition | 322,454 | 8.08 | 1 | 0 |
| New Coalition | 210,668 | 5.28 | 0 | New |
| Right Person Electorate Coalition | 209,106 | 5.24 | 1 | New |
| Keep Order! Constitution 19 Coalition | 40,836 | 1.02 | 0 | New |
| Mongolian Green Party | 23,485 | 0.59 | 0 | 0 |
| Love the People Party | 18,542 | 0.46 | 0 | 0 |
| People's Majority Governance Party | 13,733 | 0.34 | 0 | New |
| Demos Party | 8,837 | 0.22 | 0 | New |
| Freedom Implementing Party | 4,759 | 0.12 | 0 | 0 |
| Great Harmony Party | 4,118 | 0.10 | 0 | New |
| Ger Area Development Party | 3,343 | 0.08 | 0 | New |
| Development Program Party | 3,522 | 0.09 | 0 | New |
| People's Party | 3,333 | 0.08 | 0 | New |
| World Mongols Party | 591 | 0.01 | 0 | New |
| United Patriots Party | 448 | 0.01 | 0 | 0 |
| Independents | 350,806 | 8.79 | 1 | 0 |
| Total | 3,991,926 | 100.00 | 76 | 0 |
| Valid votes | 1,473,406 | 99.84 | | |
| Invalid/blank votes | 2,374 | 0.16 | | |
| Total votes | 1,475,780 | 100.00 | | |
| Registered voters/turnout | 2,003,969 | 73.64 | | |
Source: General Election Commission

=== Results by constituency ===
Results by constituency

Constituency 1. Arkhangai
| Candidate | Party | Votes | % |
|---|---|---|---|
| Yondonperenlein Baatarbileg | Mongolian People's Party | 21,849 | 48.14 |
| Jamyangiin Mönkhbat | Mongolian People's Party | 21,478 | 47.32 |
| Ganzorigiin Temüülen | Mongolian People's Party | 20,204 | 44.51 |
| Pürevbaataryn Mönkhtulga | Democratic Party | 17,155 | 37.79 |
| Dondogdorjiin Zoljargal | Democratic Party | 10,663 | 23.49 |
| Nyamjavyn Batbayar | Democratic Party | 10,041 | 22.12 |
| Enkhbayaryn Mönkhsaikhan | Independent | 7,536 | 16.60 |
| Enebishiin Bolorchuluun | Independent | 6,438 | 14.18 |
| Bataagiin Gantsetseg | Our Coalition | 4,552 | 10.03 |
| Davaadorjiin Ariunjargal | New Coalition | 4,115 | 9.07 |
| Natsagiin Udval | Our Coalition | 3,378 | 7.44 |
| Ranjilyn Badmaanyambuu | Independent | 2,885 | 6.36 |
| Dulamjavyn Mönkh-Erdene | Our Coalition | 2,545 | 5.61 |
| Batbaataryn Ganpürev | Independent | 1,092 | 2.41 |
| Lkhagvaagiin Dansranbavuu | New Coalition | 1,053 | 2.32 |
| Radnaabazaryn Jargalmaa | Right Person Electorate Coalition | 518 | 1.14 |
| Dolgoryn Sosorbaram | Keep Order! Constitution 19 Coalition | 258 | 0.57 |
| Khadbaataryn Demidbaldannyam | Zon People's Party | 242 | 0.53 |
| Jambyn Sanduijav | Right Person Electorate Coalition | 171 | 0.38 |
| Total | | 136,173 | 100.00 |
| Valid votes | | 45,391 | 99.88 |
| Invalid/blank votes | | 54 | 0.12 |
| Total votes | | 45,445 | 100.00 |
| Registered voters/turnout | | 61,227 | 74.22 |

Constituency 2. Bayan-Ölgii
| Candidate | Party | Votes | % |
|---|---|---|---|
| Khavdislamyn Badyelkhan | Mongolian People's Party | 23,379 | 46.86 |
| Tyelukhany Aubakar | Mongolian People's Party | 22,662 | 45.42 |
| Bulany Byeisen | Democratic Party | 22,448 | 44.99 |
| Aipyn Gylymkhan | Mongolian People's Party | 22,239 | 44.58 |
| Dakyein Murat | Democratic Party | 21,185 | 42.46 |
| Rakhmyetyn Gajaiv | Democratic Party | 18,203 | 36.49 |
| Bolatyn Aibyek | Our Coalition | 6,678 | 13.39 |
| Tashtuany Auyez | Our Coalition | 3,042 | 6.10 |
| Zulpain Batyrbyek | Our Coalition | 2,977 | 5.97 |
| Paldain Nyamkhüü | New Coalition | 2,679 | 5.37 |
| Kasnain Khanagat | Independent | 1,555 | 3.12 |
| Gaval-Erdeniin Bayanmönkh | Development Program Party | 812 | 1.63 |
| Mavlyetyn Tölyegyen | New Coalition | 757 | 1.52 |
| Kharatyshkhany Ganibat | New Coalition | 693 | 1.39 |
| Batmönkhiin Byambagerel | Zon People's Party | 364 | 0.73 |
| Total | | 149,673 | 100.00 |
| Valid votes | | 49,891 | 99.88 |
| Invalid/blank votes | | 58 | 0.12 |
| Total votes | | 49,949 | 100.00 |
| Registered voters/turnout | | 59,594 | 83.82 |

Constituency 3. Bayankhongor
| Candidate | Party | Votes | % |
|---|---|---|---|
| Gombojavyn Zandanshatar | Mongolian People's Party | 24,029 | 53.11 |
| Dashdondogiin Ganbat | Democratic Party | 21,427 | 47.36 |
| Amgalangiin Ad'yaasüren | Democratic Party | 19,076 | 42.16 |
| Batmönkhiin Battsetseg | Mongolian People's Party | 18,790 | 41.53 |
| Püreviin Nürzed | Democratic Party | 18,490 | 40.87 |
| Lkhagvaagiin Eldev-Ochir | Mongolian People's Party | 18,080 | 39.96 |
| Davaagiin Mönkh-Erdene | Independent | 4,948 | 10.94 |
| Erdene-Ochiryn Sodnomjamts | Our Coalition | 4,517 | 9.98 |
| Jambalyn Ganzul | Our Coalition | 1,510 | 3.34 |
| Ochiryn Batsükh | New Coalition | 900 | 1.99 |
| Gunaajavyn Tseveenjav | Our Coalition | 898 | 1.98 |
| Mandakhyn Tsendjav | New Coalition | 780 | 1.72 |
| Baasanjavyn Ankhbayar | Independent | 526 | 1.16 |
| Batchuluuny Otgonbayar | Independent | 372 | 0.82 |
| Maamyn Ganzorig | New Coalition | 315 | 0.70 |
| Jagvaralyn Tömörkhuyag | Right Person Electorate Coalition | 313 | 0.69 |
| Bayarsaikhany Uuganbayar | Independent | 246 | 0.54 |
| Myagmaryn Ariuntuyaa | Right Person Electorate Coalition | 204 | 0.45 |
| Chimeddorjiin Gantulga | People's Majority Party | 168 | 0.37 |
| Pürevsürengiin Ochirpürev | Zon People's Party | 143 | 0.32 |
| Total | | 135,732 | 100.00 |
| Valid votes | | 45,244 | 99.90 |
| Invalid/blank votes | | 46 | 0.10 |
| Total votes | | 45,290 | 100.00 |
| Registered voters/turnout | | 56,610 | 80.00 |

Constituency 4. Bulgan
| Candidate | Party | Votes | % |
|---|---|---|---|
| Tsogt-Ochiryn Anandbazar | Mongolian People's Party | 15,624 | 53.09 |
| Jadambyn Bat-Erdene | Mongolian People's Party | 14,305 | 48.60 |
| Sereenengiin Gal-Erdene | Democratic Party | 8,807 | 29.92 |
| Dorligiin Ösökhbayar | Democratic Party | 8,158 | 27.72 |
| Boldbaataryn Günbileg | Right Person Electorate Coalition | 4,661 | 15.84 |
| Shirendeviin Bulgan | Our Coalition | 2,292 | 7.79 |
| Baataryn Sanchir | Our Coalition | 960 | 3.26 |
| Gantuyaagyn Soyol-Erdene | Independent | 826 | 2.81 |
| Ganboldyn Ganchimeg | Independent | 774 | 2.63 |
| Ganbatyn Batbayar | New Coalition | 672 | 2.28 |
| Batmönkhiin Bat-Erdene | Independent | 600 | 2.04 |
| Batjargalyn Sükhbaatar | Independent | 571 | 1.94 |
| Tserendendeviin Mendee | New Coalition | 453 | 1.54 |
| Altanbaganyn Manlaibaatar | Zon People's Party | 161 | 0.55 |
| Total | | 58,864 | 100.00 |
| Valid votes | | 29,432 | 99.83 |
| Invalid/blank votes | | 51 | 0.17 |
| Total votes | | 29,483 | 100.00 |
| Registered voters/turnout | | 40,896 | 72.09 |

Constituency 5. Govi-Altai
| Candidate | Party | Votes | % |
|---|---|---|---|
| Byambasürengiin Enkh-Amgalan | Mongolian People's Party | 14,801 | 52.25 |
| Shatarbalyn Radnaased | Mongolian People's Party | 14,235 | 50.25 |
| Ochirbatyn Amgalanbaatar | Democratic Party | 12,763 | 45.06 |
| Osormaagiin Batkhand | Democratic Party | 10,620 | 37.49 |
| Bazarragchaagiin Oyuunbileg | Our Coalition | 1,637 | 5.78 |
| Lutaagiin Enkhnasan | Right Person Electorate Coalition | 1,104 | 3.90 |
| Sanduin Batbaatar | Our Coalition | 875 | 3.09 |
| Enkhtuyaagiin Erdenetuyaa | New Coalition | 296 | 1.04 |
| Tsedenbalyn Amarzayaa | Zon People's Party | 166 | 0.59 |
| Don-Ochiryn Dondovsambuu | Development Program Party | 157 | 0.55 |
| Total | | 56,654 | 100.00 |
| Valid votes | | 28,327 | 99.87 |
| Invalid/blank votes | | 36 | 0.13 |
| Total votes | | 28,363 | 100.00 |
| Registered voters/turnout | | 37,474 | 75.69 |

Constituency 6. Govisümber and Dornogovi
| Candidate | Party | Votes | % |
|---|---|---|---|
| Sükhbaataryn Batbold | Mongolian People's Party | 14,091 | 50.32 |
| Gompildoogiin Mönkhtsetseg | Mongolian People's Party | 10,175 | 36.34 |
| Batsükhiin Narankhüü | Democratic Party | 9,180 | 32.79 |
| Luvsandorjiin Odser | Democratic Party | 7,402 | 26.44 |
| Osoryn Ganbat | New Coalition | 5,802 | 20.72 |
| Narantsetsraltyn Soyombo | Independent | 4,479 | 16.00 |
| Tsetsegeegiin Mönkhbayar | Our Coalition | 1,855 | 6.62 |
| Oroolongiin Erdenetögs | New Coalition | 1,765 | 6.30 |
| Baataryn Arvinbayar | Right Person Electorate Coalition | 426 | 1.52 |
| Dashtserengiin Enkhsaikhan | Our Coalition | 334 | 1.19 |
| Pürevsürengiin Enkhbayar | Independent | 201 | 0.72 |
| Gaadangiin Batbaatar | Mongolian Green Party | 188 | 0.67 |
| Erdenetsogtyn Batchimeg | Zon People's Party | 64 | 0.23 |
| Tserenvaanchigiin Erdenebat | Keep Order! Constitution 19 Coalition | 38 | 0.14 |
| Total | | 56,000 | 100.00 |
| Valid votes | | 28,000 | 99.81 |
| Invalid/blank votes | | 53 | 0.19 |
| Total votes | | 28,053 | 100.00 |
| Registered voters/turnout | | 40,860 | 68.66 |

Constituency 7. Dornod
| Candidate | Party | Votes | % |
|---|---|---|---|
| Khayangaagiin Bolorchuluun | Mongolian People's Party | 16,798 | 46.67 |
| Tsedeviin Sergelen | Mongolian People's Party | 16,245 | 45.14 |
| Jamtsyn Enkhbold | Democratic Party | 9,797 | 27.22 |
| Püreviin Batchimeg | Democratic Party | 9,439 | 26.23 |
| Pürevgereliin Gerelbaatar | Independent | 5,027 | 13.97 |
| Chuluuny Ölziisaikhan | Our Coalition | 4,455 | 12.38 |
| Khishigeegiin Odmandakh | New Coalition | 2,770 | 7.70 |
| Gankhuyagiin Mönkh-Od | Independent | 2,493 | 6.93 |
| Sanjmyatavyn Otgonbaatar | New Coalition | 2,018 | 5.61 |
| Badamyn Dorjpürev | Independent | 517 | 1.44 |
| Choimbolyn Battulga | Right Person Electorate Coalition | 502 | 1.39 |
| Minchindorjiin Namsrai | Keep Order! Constitution 19 Coalition | 475 | 1.32 |
| Bayarsaikhany Naranbat | Independent | 459 | 1.28 |
| Khutrangaagiin Bat-Erdene | Keep Order! Constitution 19 Coalition | 456 | 1.27 |
| Shagdarsürengiin Tögsbayar | Right Person Electorate Coalition | 275 | 0.76 |
| Lkhamkhandyn Tsevegdary | Zon People's Party | 254 | 0.71 |
| Total | | 71,980 | 100.00 |
| Valid votes | | 35,990 | 99.74 |
| Invalid/blank votes | | 94 | 0.26 |
| Total votes | | 36,084 | 100.00 |
| Registered voters/turnout | | 52,236 | 69.08 |

Constituency 8. Dundgovi
| Candidate | Party | Votes | % |
|---|---|---|---|
| Borkhüügiin Delgersaikhan | Mongolian People's Party | 21,238 | 67.65 |
| Tömörtogoogiin Enkhtüvshin | Mongolian People's Party | 17,411 | 55.46 |
| Tsagaan-Övgönii Jadambaa | Democratic Party | 5,867 | 18.69 |
| Dorjrentsengiin Altangerel | Democratic Party | 5,801 | 18.48 |
| Tsendsürengiin Gantulga | New Coalition | 4,572 | 14.56 |
| Ochirsükhiin Mashbat | Independent | 2,996 | 9.54 |
| Dambaryenchingiin Erdenebat | New Coalition | 1,428 | 4.55 |
| Baatarsürengiin Uuganbayar | Mongolian Green Party | 1,244 | 3.96 |
| Sükhbatyn Mendsaikhan | Our Coalition | 959 | 3.05 |
| Chimiddorjiin Chimidsüren | Our Coalition | 686 | 2.19 |
| Solongyn Saran | Right Person Electorate Coalition | 496 | 1.58 |
| Khishigjargalyn Ariunsanaa | Zon People's Party | 88 | 0.28 |
| Total | | 62,786 | 100.00 |
| Valid votes | | 31,393 | 99.76 |
| Invalid/blank votes | | 77 | 0.24 |
| Total votes | | 31,470 | 100.00 |
| Registered voters/turnout | | 44,674 | 70.44 |

Constituency 9. Zavkhan
| Candidate | Party | Votes | % |
|---|---|---|---|
| Tsedendambyn Tserenpuntsag | Mongolian People's Party | 18,828 | 49.69 |
| Baljinnyamyn Bayarsaikhan | Mongolian People's Party | 14,350 | 37.87 |
| Zagdkhüügiin Narantuyaa | Democratic Party | 13,539 | 35.73 |
| Daimaagiin Batsaikhan | Democratic Party | 12,597 | 33.25 |
| Shinensambuugiin Saikhansambuu | New Coalition | 9,258 | 24.44 |
| Ad'yaabaljiryn Sanjmyatav | Independent | 2,121 | 5.60 |
| Altangereliin Dorjdagva | New Coalition | 1,495 | 3.95 |
| Sükhbatyn Byambaasüren | Right Person Electorate Coalition | 848 | 2.24 |
| Dorjpalamyn Erdenetsogt | Our Coalition | 716 | 1.89 |
| Erdenebatyn Gündsambuu | Our Coalition | 585 | 1.54 |
| Sovdyn Mönkhbat | Independent | 509 | 1.34 |
| Bibishiin Baasanbyamba | Independent | 464 | 1.22 |
| Baljinnyamyn Amaraa | Right Person Electorate Coalition | 335 | 0.88 |
| Dugarjavyn Bayanmönkh | Zon People's Party | 131 | 0.35 |
| Total | | 75,776 | 100.00 |
| Valid votes | | 37,888 | 99.88 |
| Invalid/blank votes | | 47 | 0.12 |
| Total votes | | 37,935 | 100.00 |
| Registered voters/turnout | | 47,397 | 80.04 |

Constituency 10. Övörkhangai
| Candidate | Party | Votes | % |
|---|---|---|---|
| Sodnomyn Chinzorig | Mongolian People's Party | 32,808 | 61.73 |
| Dulamdorjiin Togtokhsüren | Mongolian People's Party | 30,020 | 56.48 |
| Gochoogiin Ganbold | Mongolian People's Party | 23,560 | 44.33 |
| Oyuunsaikhany Altangerel | Democratic Party | 17,824 | 33.54 |
| Chimiddorjiin Davaabayar | Democratic Party | 17,433 | 32.80 |
| Batkhüügiin Gankhölög | Democratic Party | 17,277 | 32.51 |
| Ayuurzanyn Otgonbaatar | New Coalition | 10,077 | 18.96 |
| Sanjaasürengiin Orgodol | Our Coalition | 4,454 | 8.38 |
| Chagnaadorjiin Tsendee | Our Coalition | 2,219 | 4.18 |
| Damdinjavyn Mönkhbold | Right Person Electorate Coalition | 1,104 | 2.08 |
| Tömörbaataryn Khasbaatar | Independent | 1,066 | 2.01 |
| Damdinsürengiin Khoroldamba | Our Coalition | 897 | 1.69 |
| Dulamdorjiin Khishigdelger | Development Program Party | 382 | 0.72 |
| Dashbazaryn Otgontsetseg | Zon People's Party | 320 | 0.60 |
| Total | | 159,441 | 100.00 |
| Valid votes | | 53,147 | 99.82 |
| Invalid/blank votes | | 94 | 0.18 |
| Total votes | | 53,241 | 100.00 |
| Registered voters/turnout | | 74,420 | 71.54 |

Constituency 11. Ömnögovi
| Candidate | Party | Votes | % |
|---|---|---|---|
| Nanzadyn Naranbaatar | Mongolian People's Party | 15,929 | 49.71 |
| Dashdembereliin Bat-Erdene | Democratic Party | 15,239 | 47.56 |
| Kharkhüügiin Mandakhbayar | Mongolian People's Party | 14,059 | 43.88 |
| Badamgaravyn Badraa | Democratic Party | 12,888 | 40.22 |
| Agvaan-Osoryn Sükhbaatar | Our Coalition | 1,413 | 4.41 |
| Dagdangiin Erdene | Our Coalition | 1,066 | 3.33 |
| Tseveenii Beejin | New Coalition | 1,060 | 3.31 |
| Agvaandagvyn Enkhbaatar | Independent | 572 | 1.79 |
| Aviryn Gantulga | Zon People's Party | 413 | 1.29 |
| Ad'yaagiin Ganbaatar | Right Person Electorate Coalition | 406 | 1.27 |
| Dorjjodovyn Sansar | New Coalition | 301 | 0.94 |
| Rentsendoorovyn Battömör | Independent | 277 | 0.86 |
| Bilgeegiin Mönkhchuluun | Mongolian Green Party | 178 | 0.56 |
| Choisürengiin Batbayar | Independent | 155 | 0.48 |
| Erdenechimegiin Damdinsüren | Keep Order! Constitution 19 Coalition | 66 | 0.21 |
| Ganbatyn Pürevdemberel | Keep Order! Constitution 19 Coalition | 62 | 0.19 |
| Total | | 64,084 | 100.00 |
| Valid votes | | 32,042 | 99.86 |
| Invalid/blank votes | | 46 | 0.14 |
| Total votes | | 32,088 | 100.00 |
| Registered voters/turnout | | 44,914 | 71.44 |

Constituency 12. Sükhbaatar
| Candidate | Party | Votes | % |
|---|---|---|---|
| Jambyn Batsuury | Democratic Party | 19,451 | 59.02 |
| Nayantain Ganibal | Democratic Party | 17,395 | 52.78 |
| Tögsjargalyn Gandi | Mongolian People's Party | 13,214 | 40.09 |
| Zanyn Enkhtör | Mongolian People's Party | 12,998 | 39.44 |
| Namsrain Lutbayar | Our Coalition | 925 | 2.81 |
| Ailtgüin Tömör-Ochir | New Coalition | 576 | 1.75 |
| Chantsalyn Ül-Oldokh | Our Coalition | 553 | 1.68 |
| Namsrain Lkhagvasüren | New Coalition | 442 | 1.34 |
| Ryenchindorjiin Enkhtuyaa | Right Person Electorate Coalition | 278 | 0.84 |
| Jargalsaikhany Mönkhzayaa | Zon People's Party | 86 | 0.26 |
| Total | | 65,918 | 100.00 |
| Valid votes | | 32,959 | 99.76 |
| Invalid/blank votes | | 78 | 0.24 |
| Total votes | | 33,037 | 100.00 |
| Registered voters/turnout | | 40,778 | 81.02 |

Constituency 13. Selenge
| Candidate | Party | Votes | % |
|---|---|---|---|
| Jargaltulgyn Erdenebat | Mongolian People's Party | 22,865 | 46.69 |
| Chinbatyn Undram | Mongolian People's Party | 22,583 | 46.11 |
| Damdinsürengiin Önörbolor | Mongolian People's Party | 19,412 | 39.64 |
| Sangajavyn Bayartsogt | Democratic Party | 14,678 | 29.97 |
| Dondogdorjiin Erdenebat | Democratic Party | 14,548 | 29.70 |
| Donbongiin Üüriintuyaa | Democratic Party | 13,499 | 27.56 |
| Shagdarragchaagiin Erdenebat | Our Coalition | 7,857 | 16.04 |
| Bazaryn Tseepildorj | Independent | 7,250 | 14.80 |
| Amjaagiin Enkhbold | Our Coalition | 6,409 | 13.09 |
| Mongoldoogiin Nasanjargal | Our Coalition | 4,010 | 8.19 |
| Batsükhiin Khaidavmönkh | Independent | 3,405 | 6.95 |
| Batjargalyn Buyanzayaa | Independent | 3,383 | 6.91 |
| Logiin Tsog | New Coalition | 1,788 | 3.65 |
| Lkhamjavyn Orkhon | Independent | 1,120 | 2.29 |
| Gotovyn Battulga | New Coalition | 879 | 1.79 |
| Tsedeviin Bat-Erdene | Right Person Electorate Coalition | 670 | 1.37 |
| Damdinsürengiin Amarsaikhan | Right Person Electorate Coalition | 640 | 1.31 |
| Bürenjargalyn Nergüibaatar | New Coalition | 527 | 1.08 |
| Altangereliin Mönkh-Erdene | Right Person Electorate Coalition | 396 | 0.81 |
| Shiilegsürengiin Bolorsüren | Freedom Implementing Party | 320 | 0.65 |
| Nyamsürengiin Battsetseg | Keep Order! Constitution 19 Coalition | 301 | 0.61 |
| Ragchaagiin Lkhagvasüren | Zon People's Party | 209 | 0.43 |
| Badamjavyn Bazarvaany | Keep Order! Constitution 19 Coalition | 179 | 0.37 |
| Total | | 146,928 | 100.00 |
| Valid votes | | 48,976 | 99.84 |
| Invalid/blank votes | | 80 | 0.16 |
| Total votes | | 49,056 | 100.00 |
| Registered voters/turnout | | 70,420 | 69.66 |

Constituency 14. Töv
| Candidate | Party | Votes | % |
|---|---|---|---|
| Jigjidiin Batjargal | Mongolian People's Party | 18,531 | 42.39 |
| Tsevegdorjiin Tuvaan | Democratic Party | 16,125 | 36.89 |
| Nyamaagiin Enkhbold | Mongolian People's Party | 15,842 | 36.24 |
| Dagvyn Gantögs | Mongolian People's Party | 14,586 | 33.37 |
| Dulamsürengiin Dorjpürev | Independent | 13,094 | 29.96 |
| Khishigdembereliin Temüüjin | Democratic Party | 12,427 | 28.43 |
| Deremiin Erdenesuvd | Democratic Party | 9,649 | 22.07 |
| Orgoin Buyannemekh | Our Coalition | 8,512 | 19.47 |
| Tuulyn Mönkhsüld | Our Coalition | 8,148 | 18.64 |
| Sanjaagiin Erdenechimeg | Our Coalition | 4,041 | 9.24 |
| Övgönkhüügiin Gerelt-Od | Independent | 3,018 | 6.90 |
| Batbayaryn Nasanbileg | Right Person Electorate Coalition | 1,710 | 3.91 |
| Agvaansamdangiin Batsükh | New Coalition | 1,456 | 3.33 |
| Badmaabazaryn Tsondovdorj | New Coalition | 1,176 | 2.69 |
| Sedbazaryn Choijiljav | Independent | 1,028 | 2.35 |
| Lkhamsürengiin Altantuyaa | New Coalition | 961 | 2.20 |
| Dünshigiin Myagmarsüren | Keep Order! Constitution 19 Coalition | 419 | 0.96 |
| Namsraidorjiin Uyanga | Zon People's Party | 413 | 0.94 |
| Total | | 131,136 | 100.00 |
| Valid votes | | 43,712 | 99.82 |
| Invalid/blank votes | | 78 | 0.18 |
| Total votes | | 43,790 | 100.00 |
| Registered voters/turnout | | 61,765 | 70.90 |

Constituency 15. Uvs
| Candidate | Party | Votes | % |
|---|---|---|---|
| Odongiin Tsogtgerel | Democratic Party | 26,644 | 61.08 |
| Chimediin Khürelbaatar | Mongolian People's Party | 22,562 | 51.72 |
| Battogtokhyn Choijilsüren | Mongolian People's Party | 21,378 | 49.01 |
| Namsrain Tserenbat | Mongolian People's Party | 19,221 | 44.06 |
| Dashiin Tsendsüren | Democratic Party | 15,682 | 35.95 |
| Samandyn Javkhlan | Democratic Party | 12,403 | 28.43 |
| Tseveenii Batbold | Independent | 2,721 | 6.24 |
| Khorloogiin Udvaltsetseg | Our Coalition | 1,930 | 4.42 |
| Baatarjavyn Bat-Amgalan | Independent | 1,809 | 4.15 |
| Nyamaagiin Ulambayar | Our Coalition | 1,703 | 3.90 |
| Tsedeviin Ölziitogtokh | Right Person Electorate Coalition | 918 | 2.10 |
| Tsengeliin Bat-Erdene | Independent | 594 | 1.36 |
| Ganboldyn Pürevragchaa | Independent | 583 | 1.34 |
| Damdinsürengiin Gansüren | Our Coalition | 569 | 1.30 |
| Buyanjargalyn Lkhagvasüren | Independent | 447 | 1.02 |
| Shagdaryn Buyanjargal | New Coalition | 311 | 0.71 |
| Avirmediin Chinbat | New Coalition | 249 | 0.57 |
| Gansükhiin Nyamsüren | New Coalition | 235 | 0.54 |
| Ishiin Erdenechimeg | Freedom Implementing Party | 216 | 0.50 |
| Dorjnamjilyn Bold-Erdene | Right Person Electorate Coalition | 203 | 0.47 |
| Ikhbaataryn Zolzayaa | Zon People's Party | 191 | 0.44 |
| Mönkhbayaryn Tsedenpuntsag | Right Person Electorate Coalition | 170 | 0.39 |
| Dulmaagiin Gankhuyag | Freedom Implementing Party | 124 | 0.28 |
| Total | | 130,863 | 100.00 |
| Valid votes | | 43,621 | 99.87 |
| Invalid/blank votes | | 58 | 0.13 |
| Total votes | | 43,679 | 100.00 |
| Registered voters/turnout | | 52,178 | 83.71 |

Constituency 16. Khovd
| Candidate | Party | Votes | % |
|---|---|---|---|
| Shirnenbanydyn Adyshaa | Democratic Party | 22,549 | 52.37 |
| Bökhchuluuny Pürevdorj | Democratic Party | 18,578 | 43.15 |
| Sandagiin Byambatsogt | Mongolian People's Party | 18,464 | 42.88 |
| Otgoogiin Batnasan | Mongolian People's Party | 16,702 | 38.79 |
| Tsedenbalyn Tsogzolmaa | Mongolian People's Party | 15,733 | 36.54 |
| Nergüin Puntsag | Democratic Party | 12,950 | 30.08 |
| Chültemiin Gantulga | New Coalition | 4,697 | 10.91 |
| Khaltain Batbold | Our Coalition | 4,203 | 9.76 |
| Dorjiin Alimaa | Our Coalition | 3,422 | 7.95 |
| Ölziin Altai | Independent | 3,016 | 7.00 |
| Ganboldyn Bilgüün | New Coalition | 2,621 | 6.09 |
| Urtnasangiin Batzayaa | Our Coalition | 1,883 | 4.37 |
| Gantulgyn Buyanbaatar | Right Person Electorate Coalition | 1,740 | 4.04 |
| Damdinsürengiin Uuganjargal | Independent | 1,154 | 2.68 |
| Baatarjavyn Ganzorig | Keep Order! Constitution 19 Coalition | 697 | 1.62 |
| Ayuushiin Baasandemberel | New Coalition | 436 | 1.01 |
| Tömörbaataryn Oyuunbolor | Zon People's Party | 329 | 0.76 |
| Total | | 129,174 | 100.00 |
| Valid votes | | 43,058 | 99.87 |
| Invalid/blank votes | | 56 | 0.13 |
| Total votes | | 43,114 | 100.00 |
| Registered voters/turnout | | 54,343 | 79.34 |

Constituency 17. Khövsgöl
| Candidate | Party | Votes | % |
|---|---|---|---|
| Tserenpiliin Davaasüren | Mongolian People's Party | 33,783 | 54.16 |
| Lkhagvyn Mönkhbaatar | Mongolian People's Party | 29,351 | 47.05 |
| Luvsantserengiin Enkh-Amgalan | Mongolian People's Party | 27,931 | 44.78 |
| Lamjavyn Gündalai | Love the People Party | 18,542 | 29.73 |
| Chimidiin Battsogt | Democratic Party | 18,111 | 29.03 |
| Byambasürengiin Bayarmaa | Democratic Party | 13,099 | 21.00 |
| Davaadorjiin Ganbold | Democratic Party | 9,077 | 14.55 |
| Erdenebilegiin Batkhishig | New Coalition | 6,897 | 11.06 |
| Khaichaagiin Batsaikhan | Independent | 5,856 | 9.39 |
| Erdenebaataryn Magnaibayar | Our Coalition | 4,347 | 6.97 |
| Demberelnyamyn Sovd | Independent | 3,517 | 5.64 |
| Jamsrangiin Oyuunmaa | New Coalition | 3,249 | 5.21 |
| Chimediin Bazar | Our Coalition | 2,597 | 4.16 |
| Khastömöriin Beejin | Our Coalition | 2,367 | 3.79 |
| Mijiddorjiin Ganbold | Independent | 2,310 | 3.70 |
| Lamjavyn Dorjpalam | New Coalition | 1,865 | 2.99 |
| Tangadyn Tuyaa | Right Person Electorate Coalition | 1,724 | 2.76 |
| Tüvdendansrangiin Uuganbayar | Right Person Electorate Coalition | 1,084 | 1.74 |
| Badarchiin Boldbaatar | Independent | 623 | 1.00 |
| Tsendsürengiin Ariunbold | Zon People's Party | 439 | 0.70 |
| Dulmaagiin Ariuntuyaa | Keep Order! Constitution 19 Coalition | 365 | 0.59 |
| Total | | 187,134 | 100.00 |
| Valid votes | | 62,378 | 99.85 |
| Invalid/blank votes | | 91 | 0.15 |
| Total votes | | 62,469 | 100.00 |
| Registered voters/turnout | | 86,124 | 72.53 |

Constituency 18. Khentii
| Candidate | Party | Votes | % |
|---|---|---|---|
| Ukhnaagiin Khürelsükh | Mongolian People's Party | 25,356 | 71.13 |
| Luvsannamsrain Oyun-Erdene | Mongolian People's Party | 25,169 | 70.61 |
| Badmaanyambuugiin Bat-Erdene | Mongolian People's Party | 19,887 | 55.79 |
| Jagdagiin Oyuunbaatar | Democratic Party | 12,255 | 34.38 |
| Törmönkhiin Pürevkhatan | Democratic Party | 10,080 | 28.28 |
| Erdeniin Bat-Üül | Democratic Party | 6,495 | 18.22 |
| Selengiin Ononbayar | Our Coalition | 2,855 | 8.01 |
| Sanduin Jargal | Our Coalition | 1,987 | 5.57 |
| Batsuuriin Batkhishig | Our Coalition | 1,619 | 4.54 |
| Puntsagdashiin Narantuyaa | New Coalition | 437 | 1.23 |
| Dambadondogiin Baatarjav | New Coalition | 314 | 0.88 |
| Dambyn Odgerel | New Coalition | 280 | 0.79 |
| Amarsanaagiin Mönkhzul | Zon People's Party | 201 | 0.56 |
| Total | | 106,935 | 100.00 |
| Valid votes | | 35,645 | 99.82 |
| Invalid/blank votes | | 64 | 0.18 |
| Total votes | | 35,709 | 100.00 |
| Registered voters/turnout | | 49,656 | 71.91 |

Constituency 19. Darkhan-Uul
| Candidate | Party | Votes | % |
|---|---|---|---|
| Boldyn Javkhlan | Mongolian People's Party | 24,026 | 53.38 |
| Gongoryn Damdinnyam | Mongolian People's Party | 22,347 | 49.65 |
| Baagaagiin Battömör | Mongolian People's Party | 19,824 | 44.04 |
| Tordain Ganbold | Independent | 15,242 | 33.86 |
| Namsrain Mönkhdash | Democratic Party | 8,933 | 19.85 |
| Dorjzovdyn Enkhtuyaa | Democratic Party | 6,231 | 13.84 |
| Bayanjargalyn Byambasaikhan | Democratic Party | 5,726 | 12.72 |
| Ganbaataryn Bayanmönkh | Independent | 3,784 | 8.41 |
| Dashnyamyn Araajav | Our Coalition | 3,772 | 8.38 |
| Pürevdorjiin Erdenebat | New Coalition | 3,729 | 8.28 |
| Oyuunbatyn Orgil | Independent | 3,560 | 7.91 |
| Artbazaryn Galtbayar | Right Person Electorate Coalition | 2,483 | 5.52 |
| Togtokhyn Amgalan | Our Coalition | 2,471 | 5.49 |
| Banzragchiin Otgontögs | Right Person Electorate Coalition | 2,455 | 5.45 |
| Erdenebayaryn Myagmardorj | Our Coalition | 1,914 | 4.25 |
| Bat-Ochiryn Sodbold | Right Person Electorate Coalition | 1,758 | 3.91 |
| Lkhasürengiin Odbayar | Independent | 1,707 | 3.79 |
| Tsogtoogiin Amarbayasgalan | Independent | 1,528 | 3.39 |
| Jambalsürengiin Tögsjargal | New Coalition | 1,249 | 2.77 |
| Batsaikhany Nyambayar | New Coalition | 923 | 2.05 |
| Mönkhbayaryn Amarsanaa | Keep Order! Constitution 19 Coalition | 417 | 0.93 |
| Saineriin Bayar | Freedom Implementing Party | 271 | 0.60 |
| Dorjiin Terbish | People's Majority Party | 267 | 0.59 |
| Gombojavyn Enkhjargal | People's Majority Party | 245 | 0.54 |
| Gonchigzegviin Otgonjargal | Zon People's Party | 177 | 0.39 |
| Total | | 135,039 | 100.00 |
| Valid votes | | 45,013 | 99.82 |
| Invalid/blank votes | | 79 | 0.18 |
| Total votes | | 45,092 | 100.00 |
| Registered voters/turnout | | 65,195 | 69.16 |

Constituency 20. Orkhon
| Candidate | Party | Votes | % |
|---|---|---|---|
| Dambyn Batlut | Mongolian People's Party | 22,621 | 49.60 |
| Norovyn Altankhuyag | Independent | 19,595 | 42.96 |
| Sainkhüügiin Ganbaatar | Our Coalition | 17,034 | 37.35 |
| Batnasangiin Oyuungerel | Mongolian People's Party | 15,300 | 33.55 |
| Tsendiin Nyamdorj | Mongolian People's Party | 14,273 | 31.29 |
| Tsogtsaikhany Batkhuyag | Democratic Party | 9,281 | 20.35 |
| Pürevsürengiin Battör | Our Coalition | 7,786 | 17.07 |
| Oktyabriin Baasankhüü | Democratic Party | 4,666 | 10.23 |
| Myanganbuugiin Sarandavaa | Independent | 4,652 | 10.20 |
| Badarchiin Kherlen | Our Coalition | 4,625 | 10.14 |
| Dondovdorjiin Batmönkh | New Coalition | 3,113 | 6.83 |
| Alyeksandryn Undrakhtamir | Right Person Electorate Coalition | 3,022 | 6.63 |
| Dembereliin Orosoo | Democratic Party | 2,547 | 5.58 |
| Ravjiryn Myagmardorj | Independent | 1,811 | 3.97 |
| Tölöviin Khairat | Independent | 1,197 | 2.62 |
| Sereeteriin Erdenetsetseg | Right Person Electorate Coalition | 1,017 | 2.23 |
| Bat-Ochiryn Gantüshig | Right Person Electorate Coalition | 749 | 1.64 |
| Dorjpalamyn Mönkhtuyaa | New Coalition | 659 | 1.44 |
| Baasangiin Erdenezul | People's Majority Party | 621 | 1.36 |
| Bataagiin Gantulga | Independent | 493 | 1.08 |
| Davaasürengiin Tümenjargal | New Coalition | 402 | 0.88 |
| Vaanchigiin Sum'yaasükh | Independent | 340 | 0.75 |
| Mergenbilegiin Soyol | Freedom Implementing Party | 298 | 0.65 |
| Taivangiin Pürevsüren | Keep Order! Constitution 19 Coalition | 266 | 0.58 |
| Baldorjiin Mönkh-Aldar | People's Majority Party | 208 | 0.46 |
| Shagdarsürengiin Chimegsüren | Keep Order! Constitution 19 Coalition | 140 | 0.31 |
| Batboldyn Amarbayasgalan | Zon People's Party | 114 | 0.25 |
| Total | | 136,830 | 100.00 |
| Valid votes | | 45,610 | 99.84 |
| Invalid/blank votes | | 71 | 0.16 |
| Total votes | | 45,681 | 100.00 |
| Registered voters/turnout | | 66,830 | 68.35 |

Constituency 21. Bagakhangai, Baganuur and Nalaikh
| Candidate | Party | Votes | % |
|---|---|---|---|
| Sainbuyangiin Amarsaikhan | Mongolian People's Party | 21,969 | 68.82 |
| Tsendiin Sandag-Ochir | Mongolian People's Party | 15,576 | 48.79 |
| Tserendulamyn Altantsetseg | Democratic Party | 4,912 | 15.39 |
| Mangalsürengiin Enkh-Amar | Democratic Party | 4,599 | 14.41 |
| Erdenebilegiin Erdenejam'yan | Our Coalition | 4,348 | 13.62 |
| Pürevsürengiin Tsolmon | Our Coalition | 4,023 | 12.60 |
| Begzsürengiin Gantulga | New Coalition | 2,203 | 6.90 |
| Badralyn Mönkhdöl | Right Person Electorate Coalition | 1,554 | 4.87 |
| Gombosürengiin Chogloonamjil | Independent | 1,475 | 4.62 |
| Davaasambuugiin Oyuunchimeg | New Coalition | 1,384 | 4.34 |
| Gelegiin Baasan | Independent | 1,010 | 3.16 |
| Tsogiin Nandinbaatar | Right Person Electorate Coalition | 372 | 1.17 |
| Gankhuyagiin Byambatulga | Keep Order! Constitution 19 Coalition | 310 | 0.97 |
| Bolyskhany Rizaguly | Zon People's Party | 113 | 0.35 |
| Total | | 63,848 | 100.00 |
| Valid votes | | 31,924 | 99.77 |
| Invalid/blank votes | | 74 | 0.23 |
| Total votes | | 31,998 | 100.00 |
| Registered voters/turnout | | 44,617 | 71.72 |

Constituency 22. Bayanzürkh
| Candidate | Party | Votes | % |
|---|---|---|---|
| Battömöriin Enkhbayar | Mongolian People's Party | 36,364 | 45.16 |
| Batsükhiin Saranchimeg | Mongolian People's Party | 25,228 | 31.33 |
| Pürevsürengiin Naranbayar | Right Person Electorate Coalition | 23,479 | 29.16 |
| Zandaakhüügiin Enkhbold | Democratic Party | 18,170 | 22.57 |
| Tümendelgeriin Battsogt | Democratic Party | 12,339 | 15.32 |
| Gonchigdorjiin Uyangakhishig | Right Person Electorate Coalition | 6,493 | 8.06 |
| Ganbatyn Tulga | Independent | 4,894 | 6.08 |
| Tsoodolyn Khulan | Independent | 4,706 | 5.84 |
| Ravjaagiin Ösökhbayar | Our Coalition | 4,168 | 5.18 |
| Zulaagiin Bat-Otgon | Great Harmony Party | 4,118 | 5.11 |
| Khaltaryn Batsuury | New Coalition | 4,087 | 5.08 |
| Manjaagiin Ichinnorov | Independent | 4,030 | 5.01 |
| Sanjjavyn Amarsaikhan | New Coalition | 3,740 | 4.64 |
| Gantulgyn Zolzayaa | Our Coalition | 3,707 | 4.60 |
| Jalkharyn Batzorig | Keep Order! Constitution 19 Coalition | 901 | 1.12 |
| Dorjgotovyn Batjargal | Independent | 687 | 0.85 |
| Avirmediin Erdenebayar | Freedom Implementing Party | 681 | 0.85 |
| Ganchilyn Ganbat | United Patriots Party | 448 | 0.56 |
| Shagdaryn Ganbold | Independent | 434 | 0.54 |
| Bayarsaikhany Pürevjav | Mongolian Green Party | 356 | 0.44 |
| Baasansürengiin Tsatsraltuyaa | Mongolian Green Party | 344 | 0.43 |
| Lüüreviin Önörchimeg | Development Program Party | 343 | 0.43 |
| Sosorbaramyn Barsbold | Independent | 343 | 0.43 |
| Chuluunbaataryn Chuluuntsetseg | Independent | 318 | 0.39 |
| Dashdondogiin Ganzorig | People's Majority Party | 251 | 0.31 |
| Tsetsgeegiin Mönkhjargal | People's Majority Party | 177 | 0.22 |
| Baataryn Lkhamkhüü | Zon People's Party | 116 | 0.14 |
| Ulaankhüügiin Myagmarkhüü | Zon People's Party | 112 | 0.14 |
| Total | | 161,034 | 100.00 |
| Valid votes | | 80,517 | 99.82 |
| Invalid/blank votes | | 142 | 0.18 |
| Total votes | | 80,659 | 100.00 |
| Registered voters/turnout | | 110,069 | 73.28 |

Constituency 23. Bayanzürkh
| Candidate | Party | Votes | % |
|---|---|---|---|
| Jigjidsürengiin Chinbüren | Mongolian People's Party | 41,004 | 52.69 |
| Khürelbaataryn Bulgantuya | Mongolian People's Party | 35,472 | 45.58 |
| Enkhtaivany Bat-Amgalan | Mongolian People's Party | 30,870 | 39.67 |
| Jalbasürengiin Batzandan | New Coalition | 19,237 | 24.72 |
| Jadambaagiin Bayasgalan | Democratic Party | 17,012 | 21.86 |
| Davaakhüügiin Pürevdavaa | Democratic Party | 14,115 | 18.14 |
| Tsogtoogiin Odontungalag | Democratic Party | 13,472 | 17.31 |
| Donorovyn Gantulga | Right Person Electorate Coalition | 9,732 | 12.51 |
| Shinensambuugiin Batsambuu | New Coalition | 6,368 | 8.18 |
| Tserenkhüügiin Battuyaa | New Coalition | 5,947 | 7.64 |
| Batdelgeriin Batbold | Our Coalition | 4,667 | 6.00 |
| Sonomyn Byambasüren | Our Coalition | 4,313 | 5.54 |
| Byambasürengiin Bayarmagnai | Independent | 3,876 | 4.98 |
| Tserenbaltavyn Minjin | Independent | 3,509 | 4.51 |
| Lkhagvasürengiin Önörbayar | Our Coalition | 3,437 | 4.42 |
| Galindeviin Ragchaasüren | Right Person Electorate Coalition | 3,335 | 4.29 |
| Altanchuluuny Dölgöön | Right Person Electorate Coalition | 3,213 | 4.13 |
| Sanjsürengiin Batchuluun | Independent | 1,620 | 2.08 |
| Övgönkhüügiin Erdenebold | Independent | 1,610 | 2.07 |
| Janyn Ganbaatar | Independent | 1,326 | 1.70 |
| Batkhuyagiin Batsükh | Ger Area Development Party | 1,162 | 1.49 |
| Ochirbatyn Zayaa | Development Program Party | 1,074 | 1.38 |
| Naryn Sarangerel | Zon People's Party | 816 | 1.05 |
| Sugiryn Maam | Mongolian Green Party | 670 | 0.86 |
| Pürevdorjiin Khishigbayar | Keep Order! Constitution 19 Coalition | 628 | 0.81 |
| Batsükhiin Batsaikhan | Independent | 561 | 0.72 |
| Ad'yaagiin Bat-Erdene | Independent | 535 | 0.69 |
| Gansükhiin Javkhlan | Independent | 511 | 0.66 |
| Damdinsürengiin Bayanzul | Keep Order! Constitution 19 Coalition | 509 | 0.65 |
| Dashiin Batsükh | Independent | 505 | 0.65 |
| Maamaagiin Enkhdelger | Independent | 467 | 0.60 |
| Gombojavyn Sükhbold | Keep Order! Constitution 19 Coalition | 442 | 0.57 |
| Byambatsogtyn Bayarbaatar | Independent | 433 | 0.56 |
| Vandandorjiin Ganbold | People's Majority Party | 363 | 0.47 |
| Bayaraagiin Mönkhbat | Independent | 328 | 0.42 |
| Daramsengiin Batbileg | People's Majority Party | 307 | 0.39 |
| Total | | 233,446 | 100.00 |
| Valid votes | | 77,816 | 99.79 |
| Invalid/blank votes | | 163 | 0.21 |
| Total votes | | 77,979 | 100.00 |
| Registered voters/turnout | | 112,148 | 69.53 |

Constituency 24. Sükhbaatar
| Candidate | Party | Votes | % |
|---|---|---|---|
| Damdiny Tsogtbaatar | Mongolian People's Party | 25,333 | 39.49 |
| Tsendiin Mönkh-Orgil | Mongolian People's Party | 23,637 | 36.84 |
| Tserenjamtsyn Mönkhtsetseg | Mongolian People's Party | 20,584 | 32.08 |
| Rinchinnyamyn Amarjargal | Democratic Party | 15,403 | 24.01 |
| Sükhbaataryn Erdenebold | Democratic Party | 13,061 | 20.36 |
| Erdenebaataryn Dolgion | Democratic Party | 11,880 | 18.52 |
| Gendendaramyn Gankhüü | Right Person Electorate Coalition | 11,705 | 18.24 |
| Baatarjavyn Mönkhsoyol | Right Person Electorate Coalition | 11,218 | 17.49 |
| Dembereltserengiin Mönkh-Erdene | Right Person Electorate Coalition | 9,540 | 14.87 |
| Parchaagiin Shinjeeravdan | Our Coalition | 7,061 | 11.01 |
| Zuunain Shagdarsüren | Our Coalition | 5,671 | 8.84 |
| Sodnomdarjaagiin Davaasüren | Independent | 5,358 | 8.35 |
| Banzragchiin Delgermaa | Our Coalition | 4,993 | 7.78 |
| Olzodyn Bum-Yalagch | Mongolian Green Party | 3,443 | 5.37 |
| Tsendiin Enkhbat | New Coalition | 3,116 | 4.86 |
| Byambyn Mönkhjargal | New Coalition | 2,868 | 4.47 |
| Chimed-Ochiryn Mendsaikhan | Independent | 2,746 | 4.28 |
| Tsogtsaikhany Buyantsogtoo | Independent | 2,100 | 3.27 |
| Markhaajiin Choidorj | Independent | 2,089 | 3.26 |
| Agvaandorjiin Saruul | Independent | 1,941 | 3.03 |
| Tsegmidiin Tömörbaatar | Keep Order! Constitution 19 Coalition | 1,535 | 2.39 |
| Sharavyn Amgalan | Zon People's Party | 1,290 | 2.01 |
| Agnaibayaryn Chingiskhaan | Independent | 671 | 1.05 |
| Tseveendorjiin Erdem | Independent | 538 | 0.84 |
| Jantsandorjiin Yanjinsüre | Independent | 373 | 0.58 |
| Ochirbatyn Selenge | Development Program Party | 370 | 0.58 |
| Byaruuzany Oyuunsaikhan | People's Majority Party | 369 | 0.58 |
| Tsogzoogiin Khürelbaatar | Freedom Implementing Party | 361 | 0.56 |
| Gembeliin Temüüjin | World Mongols Party | 358 | 0.56 |
| Luvsanvandangiin Daramsenge | People's Majority Party | 241 | 0.38 |
| Dovchinsürengiin Chimedbavuu | Independent | 240 | 0.37 |
| Gürragchaagiin Badamragchaa | Keep Order! Constitution 19 Coalition | 220 | 0.34 |
| Tömöriin Tömörbat | World Mongols Party | 132 | 0.21 |
| Ochirbatyn Itgelsüren | Zon People's Party | 112 | 0.17 |
| Dorjgotovyn Enkhjargal | World Mongols Party | 101 | 0.16 |
| Total | | 190,658 | 100.00 |
| Valid votes | | 64,155 | 99.86 |
| Invalid/blank votes | | 90 | 0.14 |
| Total votes | | 64,245 | 100.00 |
| Registered voters/turnout | | 87,043 | 73.81 |

Constituency 25. Chingeltei
| Candidate | Party | Votes | % |
|---|---|---|---|
| Tömörbaataryn Ayuursaikhan | Mongolian People's Party | 33,356 | 48.36 |
| Mönkhöögiin Oyuunchimeg | Mongolian People's Party | 27,339 | 39.63 |
| Jam'yankhorloogiin Sükhbaatar | Mongolian People's Party | 23,365 | 33.87 |
| Bazarsadyn Jargalsaikhan | New Coalition | 16,680 | 24.18 |
| Tsendiin Baatarkhüü | Democratic Party | 12,422 | 18.01 |
| Dorjrentsengiin Sündii | Keep Order! Constitution 19 Coalition | 12,359 | 17.92 |
| Badrakhyn Naidalaa | Right Person Electorate Coalition | 10,246 | 14.85 |
| Rinzaany Bulgamaa | Democratic Party | 9,888 | 14.34 |
| Gantömöriin Uyanga | Democratic Party | 9,012 | 13.07 |
| Tserendorjiin Gankhuyag | Our Coalition | 6,226 | 9.03 |
| Byambasürengiin Jagar | Mongolian Green Party | 6,118 | 8.87 |
| Tserendorjiin Pürevkhüü | Independent | 5,677 | 8.23 |
| Sharkhüügiin Khishigsüren | Our Coalition | 4,493 | 6.51 |
| Batyn Batbaatar | Our Coalition | 4,022 | 5.83 |
| Sharavdembereliin Enkhtuul | Right Person Electorate Coalition | 3,528 | 5.11 |
| Tsendiin Enkhtuyaa | Independent | 2,873 | 4.17 |
| Gombojavyn Ganbayar | Right Person Electorate Coalition | 2,620 | 3.80 |
| Dagdangiin Ankhbayar | Independent | 2,574 | 3.73 |
| Jukovyn Bayarjavkhlan | Independent | 2,514 | 3.64 |
| Rentsendorjiin Uuganbaatar | New Coalition | 2,278 | 3.30 |
| Sharkhüügiin Nanjid | New Coalition | 1,792 | 2.60 |
| Dagvadorjiin Ulambayar | Keep Order! Constitution 19 Coalition | 1,267 | 1.84 |
| Otgony Narantuyaa | Ger Area Development Party | 1,150 | 1.67 |
| Davaanyamyn Ochirkhuyag | Independent | 930 | 1.35 |
| Batsaikhany Amartüvshin | Independent | 925 | 1.34 |
| Gombodorjiin Orgil | Independent | 871 | 1.26 |
| Mijiddorjiin Bat | Keep Order! Constitution 19 Coalition | 659 | 0.96 |
| Jam'yansürengiin Oimandakh | Independent | 424 | 0.61 |
| Dembereliin Önörzul | Development Program Party | 384 | 0.56 |
| Gankhüügiin Batbayar | Freedom Implementing Party | 345 | 0.50 |
| Choisürengiin Buyanjargal | People's Majority Party | 258 | 0.37 |
| Dashdelegiin Nyamtüshig | People's Majority Party | 172 | 0.25 |
| Buyantogtokhyn Batmönkh | Zon People's Party | 164 | 0.24 |
| Total | | 206,931 | 100.00 |
| Valid votes | | 68,977 | 99.83 |
| Invalid/blank votes | | 115 | 0.17 |
| Total votes | | 69,092 | 100.00 |
| Registered voters/turnout | | 96,838 | 71.35 |

Constituency 26. Bayangol
| Candidate | Party | Votes | % |
|---|---|---|---|
| Khassuuriin Gankhuyag | Mongolian People's Party | 50,073 | 48.33 |
| Jambalyn Ganbaatar | Mongolian People's Party | 48,624 | 46.93 |
| Saldangiin Odontuyaa | Democratic Party | 27,143 | 26.20 |
| Danzangiin Lündeejantsan | Mongolian People's Party | 26,890 | 25.95 |
| Pürevdorjiin Galindev | Independent | 25,866 | 24.97 |
| Sodnomzunduin Erdene | Democratic Party | 17,031 | 16.44 |
| Jargalsaikhany Zoljargal | Right Person Electorate Coalition | 15,706 | 15.16 |
| Dogsomyn Battsogt | Democratic Party | 12,607 | 12.17 |
| Danydain Jargalsaikhan | New Coalition | 11,401 | 11.00 |
| Pürevdorjiin Tsogtbaatar | Our Coalition | 9,229 | 8.91 |
| Mönkhtöriin Narantuyaa- Nara | Independent | 8,596 | 8.30 |
| Dashdondogiin Üürtsaikh | Right Person Electorate Coalition | 7,867 | 7.59 |
| Dolgoryn Tümen-Ölzii | Right Person Electorate Coalition | 7,337 | 7.08 |
| Demchigiin Bolor | Independent | 7,306 | 7.05 |
| Namjaagiin Dashzeveg | Keep Order! Constitution 19 Coalition | 5,766 | 5.57 |
| Yondonsambuugiin Byambatogtokh | Our Coalition | 5,301 | 5.12 |
| Ganbaataryn Erdenetuyaa | Mongolian Green Party | 5,026 | 4.85 |
| Bazarragchaa Zorigoo | New Coalition | 2,657 | 2.56 |
| Chuluunbaatar Enkhzayaa | Independent | 2,627 | 2.54 |
| Tserendorjiin Solongo | New Coalition | 2,362 | 2.28 |
| Pürevbaatar Büüveibaatar | Independent | 1,306 | 1.26 |
| Ochirkhuyagiin Mönkhtulga | Independent | 1,153 | 1.11 |
| Sodnomtsogiin Sükh-Ochir | Independent | 1,050 | 1.01 |
| Khalkhyn Gankhuyag | Independent | 1,023 | 0.99 |
| Sükheegiin Odontuyaa | Keep Order! Constitution 19 Coalition | 872 | 0.84 |
| Shoovdoryn Tömörsükh | Freedom Implementing Party | 784 | 0.76 |
| Sharavyn Tsengel | Mongolian Green Party | 687 | 0.66 |
| Namjilyn Dashdavaa | Keep Order! Constitution 19 Coalition | 676 | 0.65 |
| Shagdaryn Mönkhbaatar | People's Majority Party | 589 | 0.57 |
| Chuluunbatyn Ankhbayar | Independent | 575 | 0.55 |
| Pürevdorjiin Mönkhbayar | Independent | 574 | 0.55 |
| Batzayaagyn Ariunsanaa | Zon People's Party | 554 | 0.53 |
| Sanj-Osoryn Batdorj | Mongolian Green Party | 466 | 0.45 |
| Damdiny Batsaikhan | People's Majority Party | 407 | 0.39 |
| Surmaadorjiin Batsükh | Independent | 354 | 0.34 |
| Denzengiin Chuluunbat | People's Majority Party | 327 | 0.32 |
| Total | | 310,812 | 100.00 |
| Valid votes | | 103,604 | 99.87 |
| Invalid/blank votes | | 140 | 0.13 |
| Total votes | | 103,744 | 100.00 |
| Registered voters/turnout | | 135,169 | 76.75 |

Constituency 27. Songino Khairkhan
| Candidate | Party | Votes | % |
|---|---|---|---|
| Khishgeegiin Nyambaatar | Mongolian People's Party | 32,962 | 56.77 |
| Badarchiin Jargalmaa | Mongolian People's Party | 24,867 | 42.83 |
| Buyaagiin Tulga | Our Coalition | 12,172 | 20.96 |
| Badamdorjiin Punsalmaa | Democratic Party | 9,105 | 15.68 |
| Davaagiin Kyoküshyuzan Batbayar | Democratic Party | 8,709 | 15.00 |
| Dashaagiin Byambasüren | Our Coalition | 7,913 | 13.63 |
| Jadambaagiin Otgonbayar | Right Person Electorate Coalition | 6,523 | 11.24 |
| Enkhboldyn Bolorchuluun | Independent | 2,800 | 4.82 |
| Batzorigiin Erdenee | Right Person Electorate Coalition | 2,078 | 3.58 |
| Sainbayaryn Amarsüld | Independent | 1,653 | 2.85 |
| Khaltaryn Oyuuntsetseg | New Coalition | 1,274 | 2.19 |
| Yagaany Möngöntsetseg | Ger Area Development Party | 1,031 | 1.78 |
| Chadraabalyn Otgonchuluun | Independent | 991 | 1.71 |
| Borisyn Sarantsetseg | New Coalition | 785 | 1.35 |
| Batsükhiin Altankhuyag | Mongolian Green Party | 705 | 1.21 |
| Dorjpalamyn Khosbayar | Keep Order! Constitution 19 Coalition | 480 | 0.83 |
| Orgilyn Enkhmaa | Independent | 434 | 0.75 |
| Dügerjavyn Batbaatar | People's Majority Party | 388 | 0.67 |
| Doljingiin Narmandakh | People's Majority Party | 304 | 0.52 |
| Boldbaataryn Otgontuul | Keep Order! Constitution 19 Coalition | 289 | 0.50 |
| Ochirboldyn Sarantuyaa | Independent | 278 | 0.48 |
| Gombodorjiin Zolbayar | Independent | 259 | 0.45 |
| Delgerbatyn Nasanbayar | Zon People's Party | 118 | 0.20 |
| Total | | 116,118 | 100.00 |
| Valid votes | | 58,059 | 99.78 |
| Invalid/blank votes | | 127 | 0.22 |
| Total votes | | 58,186 | 100.00 |
| Registered voters/turnout | | 84,640 | 68.75 |

Constituency 28. Songino Khairkhan
| Candidate | Party | Votes | % |
|---|---|---|---|
| Nyam-Osoryn Uchral | Mongolian People's Party | 53,651 | 65.64 |
| Dolgorsürengiin Sumyaabazar | Mongolian People's Party | 36,785 | 45.00 |
| Purev-Ochiryn Anujin | Mongolian People's Party | 32,031 | 39.19 |
| Enkhbayaryn Batshugar | Our Coalition | 22,991 | 28.13 |
| Samdannyamyn Mönkhchuluun | Independent | 11,579 | 14.17 |
| Mijidiin Tulga | Our Coalition | 10,951 | 13.40 |
| Ganbatyn Ochirbat | Democratic Party | 10,761 | 13.17 |
| Khadbaataryn Bat-Yalalt | Keep Order! Constitution 19 Coalition | 8,112 | 9.92 |
| Myanganbuugiin Naranbaatar | Our Coalition | 7,469 | 9.14 |
| Otgonjargalyn Magnai | Democratic Party | 7,324 | 8.96 |
| Shagdarsürengiin Gantulga | People's Majority Party | 6,365 | 7.79 |
| Pürveegiin Tsetsegmaa | Democratic Party | 6,132 | 7.50 |
| Ad'yaabatyn Amarbayar | Right Person Electorate Coalition | 5,621 | 6.88 |
| Rinchinlkhümbiin Nyam-Ochir | Independent | 5,038 | 6.16 |
| Bayanjargalyn Tsogtgerel | New Coalition | 4,242 | 5.19 |
| Shagdarsürengiin Gantulga | People's Party | 3,333 | 4.08 |
| Tsevegrashiin Erdenechuluun | Mongolian Green Party | 3,329 | 4.07 |
| Danydain Enkhsaikhan | New Coalition | 2,953 | 3.61 |
| Tserendorjiin Tüvshintör | Independent | 1,689 | 2.07 |
| Donjoogiin Batbayar | New Coalition | 1,093 | 1.34 |
| Myagmaryn Altankhuyag | Keep Order! Constitution 19 Coalition | 693 | 0.85 |
| Nyamdorjiin Gan-Od | Freedom Implementing Party | 599 | 0.73 |
| Byambarinchingiin Bayaraa | Keep Order! Constitution 19 Coalition | 586 | 0.72 |
| Pürevsürengiin Mönkhchimeg | Zon People's Party | 567 | 0.69 |
| Altantsetsegiin Batdorj | People's Majority Party | 502 | 0.61 |
| Lkhündeviin Lkhagvadorj | People's Majority Party | 449 | 0.55 |
| Chuluundorjiin Mönkhbayar | Freedom Implementing Party | 366 | 0.45 |
| Total | | 245,211 | 100.00 |
| Valid votes | | 81,737 | 99.85 |
| Invalid/blank votes | | 123 | 0.15 |
| Total votes | | 81,860 | 100.00 |
| Registered voters/turnout | | 111,107 | 73.68 |

Constituency 29. Khan Uul
| Candidate | Party | Votes | % |
|---|---|---|---|
| Ganibalyn Amartüvshin | Mongolian People's Party | 37,476 | 42.16 |
| Davaajantsangiin Sarangerel | Mongolian People's Party | 37,457 | 42.13 |
| Togmidyn Dorjkhand | Right Person Electorate Coalition | 24,450 | 27.50 |
| Jukovyn Aldarjavkhlan | Mongolian People's Party | 23,606 | 26.55 |
| Banzragchiin Tüvshin | Democratic Party | 19,275 | 21.68 |
| Jargaltsengeliin Erkhembaatar | Independent | 14,396 | 16.19 |
| Nyamtaishiryn Nomtoibayar | Independent | 13,960 | 15.70 |
| Luvsanvandangiin Bold | New Coalition | 12,558 | 14.13 |
| Tömördöshiin Bayarkhüü | Our Coalition | 12,460 | 14.02 |
| Tsedeviin Tsolmon | Independent | 11,795 | 13.27 |
| Chadraabalyn Önörbayar | Democratic Party | 9,062 | 10.19 |
| Terbishiin Enkhsaikhan | Democratic Party | 7,848 | 8.83 |
| Törboldyn Bat-Orgil | Independent | 6,892 | 7.75 |
| Baasangiin Naminchimed | Our Coalition | 5,238 | 5.89 |
| Bayarkhüügiin Mönkhtselmeg | Right Person Electorate Coalition | 5,235 | 5.89 |
| Erdenedelgeriin Tüvshin | New Coalition | 5,086 | 5.72 |
| Ganbaataryn Javkhlantögs | Right Person Electorate Coalition | 4,874 | 5.48 |
| Tserendashiin Oyuunbaatar | Our Coalition | 4,562 | 5.13 |
| Lkhagvadorjiin Ariunaa | New Coalition | 3,827 | 4.30 |
| Akhanbayaryn Galbadrakh | Independent | 2,190 | 2.46 |
| Davaagiin Basandorj | Independent | 1,433 | 1.61 |
| Gochoosürengiin Batjargal | Independent | 425 | 0.48 |
| Serchingiin Üürtsaikh | Freedom Implementing Party | 394 | 0.44 |
| Bataagiin Gerelttsolmon | Keep Order! Constitution 19 Coalition | 393 | 0.44 |
| Dovdongiin Enkhbold | Mongolian Green Party | 386 | 0.43 |
| Janchivyn Oyuunjargal | Zon People's Party | 370 | 0.42 |
| Myagmaryn Nyamgerel | Mongolian Green Party | 345 | 0.39 |
| Nanzaddorjiin Erdenetsetseg | People's Majority Party | 293 | 0.33 |
| Oidovyn Lkhagvadorj | People's Majority Party | 261 | 0.29 |
| Agvaanpüreviin Dugarmaa | People's Majority Party | 201 | 0.23 |
| Total | | 266,748 | 100.00 |
| Valid votes | | 88,900 | 99.90 |
| Invalid/blank votes | | 89 | 0.10 |
| Total votes | | 88,989 | 100.00 |
| Registered voters/turnout | | 114,747 | 77.55 |

=== Incumbents who were unseated ===
Members of Parliament who lost re-election
| MP | Seat | First elected | Party | New MP | New party |
|---|---|---|---|---|---|
| Dakein Murat | Bayan-Ölgii | 2016 | DP | Not applicable | |
| Lkhagvaagiin Eldev-Ochir | Bayankhongor | 2016 | MPP | Not applicable | |
| Nyamtaishiryn Nomtoibayar (Note: Nyamtaishiryn Nomtoibayar was relieved from his parliamentary duties in early 2020 following investigations into alleged abuse of power as labour minister.) | Dornod | 2012 | Independent | Not applicable | |
| Batsükhiin Narankhüü | Dundgovi | 2012 | DP | Not applicable | |
| Zagdkhüügiin Narantuyaa | Zavkhan | 2016 | DP | Not applicable | |
| Dondogdorjiin Erdenebat | Selenge | 2012 | DP | Not applicable | |
| Namsrain Tserenbat | Uvs | 2016 | MPP | Not applicable | |
| Otgoogiin Batnasan | Khovd | 2016 | MPP | Not applicable | |
| Oktyabriin Baasankhüü | Orkhon | 2016 | DP | Not applicable | |
| Jalbasürengiin Batzandan | Bayanzürkh | 2012 | NEW | Not applicable | |
| Samandyn Javkhlan | Bayanzürkh | 2016 | DP | Not applicable | |
| Tsendiin Nyamdorj | Bagakhangai / Khan-Uul | 1992 | MPP | Not applicable | |
| Luvsanvandangiin Bold | Bagakhangai / Khan-Uul | 2008 | NEW | Not applicable | |
| Tsedenbalyn Tsogzolmaa | Baganuur / Sükhbaatar | 2016 | MPP | Not applicable | |
| Sodnomzunduin Erdene | Bayangol | 2008 | DP | Not applicable | |
| Danzangiin Lündeejantsan | Bayangol | 1992 | MPP | Not applicable | |

== See also ==
- List of MPs elected in the 2020 Mongolian parliamentary election
