= Mongolian National Democratic Party =

Mongolian National Democratic Party may refer to:

- Mongolian National Democratic Party (1992–1999) (Монголын Үндэсний Ардчилсан Нам), a cofounder of the Democratic Party in 2000
- Mongolian National Democratic Party (2005) (Монгол Үндэсний Ардчилсан Нам), known until 2011 as the National New Party (Үндэсний Шинэ Нам, ҮШН), formed the Justice Coalition with the Mongolian People's Revolutionary Party

== See also ==
- Democratic Party (Mongolia)
- List of political parties in Mongolia
