= Our Coalition =

Political party alliance in Mongolia

Our Coalition Та бидний эвсэл
- One of the logos of Our coalition
- Leader: Nambaryn Enkhbayar
- Leader of the Civil Will–Green Party: Tserendorjiin Gankhuyag
- Leader of the Mongolian Traditional United Party: Batdelgeriin Batbold
- Founded: 23 March 2020
- Dissolved: c. 2021, 2 July 2024 (In accordance with the law)
- Ideology: Big tent
- Alliance parties: Mongolian People's Revolutionary Party; Civil Will–Green Party; Mongolian Traditional United Party
- Colors: Red
- State Great Khural (2020–2021): 1 / 76

Our Coalition (Mongolian: Та бидний эвсэл, Ta bidnii evsel) was an electoral alliance formed to run for 2020 Mongolian parliamentary election. It consisted of three political parties: Mongolian People's Revolutionary Party, Civil Will–Green Party, and Mongolian Traditional United Party. The coalition gained 1 seat in the State Great Khural. According to Mongolian law, the coalition is considered dissolved in 2024.

== Ideology ==
The coalition's platform proposed following actions:

- Nationalization of natural resources;
- Change government form into presidential republic;
- Establish a bicameral parliament;
- Change the procedure for appointing judges: election from citizens instead of being appointed by the president;
- Make public universities tuition-free and make the government bear the cost;
- Full coverage of the cost of medical treatment and services provided by state-owned health institutions by the government.

== History ==
=== Before election ===
The parties joined to the coalition were agreed to nominate 56 candidates from Mongolian People's Revolutionary Party, 15 candidates from Civil Will–Green Party, and 5 candidates from Mongolian Traditional United Party, and intended to nominate former president, Nambaryn Enkhbayar. However, Enkhbayar was not registered by the General Election Commission because it was stated in Article 29.8 of the Law on the State Great Khural elections that "If the person has been found guilty for corruption or abuse of office, it is prohibited to run for elections", and even though he appealed to the Constitutional Court of Mongolia to annul the article. It was unsuccessful and he was unable to be nominated.

=== After the election and breakdown ===
In 2020 election, Sainkhüügiin Ganbaatar, the deputy chairman of the Mongolian People's Revolutionary Party won in the Orkhon Province's 20th constituency, by thus the coalition gained one seat in the parliament. After announcement of Mongolian People's Revolutionary Party's merger with Mongolian People's Party, Ganbaatar, who was displeased with it, left the MPRP and joined the Democratic Party on 29 April 2021. In result, the coalition lost only seat in the State Great Khural, and also lost the right to nominate candidate for the 2021 Mongolian presidential election. Gankhuyag, the chairman of Civil Will–Green Party, accused Ganbaatar, that he broke the agreement to become a member of Civil Will–Green Party.

== Election results ==
=== State Great Khural election ===
Election	Party leader	Votes	%	Seats	+/–	Position	Government
2020	Nambaryn Enkhbayar	323,675	8.10%	1 / 76	New	3rd	Opposition

== See also ==
- Politics of Mongolia
- List of political parties in Mongolia
- Justice Coalition, former president Enkhbayar's MPRP led-coalition formed to run 2012 Mongolian parliamentary election
