= Civil Will–Green Party =

Political party in Mongolia

Civil Will–Green Party Иргэний Зориг Ногоон Нам
- Abbreviation: CWGP (English); ИЗНН (Mongolian)
- Chairperson: Batyn Batbaatar
- Founder: Sanjaasürengiin Oyun; Dangaasürengiin Enkhbat
- Founded: 12 March 2012; 14 years ago
- Merger of: Green Party (faction) (25 November 1990); Civil Will Party (9 March 2000)
- Headquarters: Ulaanbaatar
- Ideology: Green liberalism
- Political position: Centre
- National affiliation: Our Coalition (2020–2021)
- International affiliation: Liberal International; Council of Asian Liberals and Democrats
- Colors: Green; White
- Slogan: Шинэчлэлд зоригтой бай! ("Be willing for change!")
- State Great Khural: 4 / 126
- Provincial Governors: 0 / 21
- Ulaanbaatar District Governors: 0 / 9

Party flag

Website
- iznn.mn

The Civil Will–Green Party (Mongolian: Иргэний Зориг Ногоон Нам, romanized: Irgeniy Zorig Nogoon Nam, (Note: In English, the party can be called both the Civil Will–Green Party and the Civil Will–Green Party of Mongolia. The official name of the party in Mongolian is Civil Will–Green Party) abbreviated ИЗНН or CWGP) is a green liberal political party in Mongolia. It was founded in 2012 with the 2011 merger of the Civil Will Party and the Mongolian Green Party.

== Precursors ==
The Civil Will Party (CWP) was established on 9 March 2000, with Sanjaasürengiin Oyun as chairwoman and E. Narmandakh as general secretary. The party's name in Mongolian is a reference to the name of Oyun's murdered brother Sanjaasürengiin Zorig, one of the leaders of the 1990 democratic movement. His name literally meaning "Will" or "Courage."

In the 2000 parliamentary election, the Civil Will Party entered a coalition with the Mongolian Green Party (MGP), and won its first seat in the State Great Khural (parliament). Before the 2008 parliamentary election, the Mongolian National Unity Party (Mongolian: Монголын Үндэсний Эв Нэгдлийн Нам) merged with the Civil Will Party. In the ensuing June 2008 elections, the party secured a single seat in the State Great Khural, while receiving 1.97% of the popular vote. The CWP was admitted as an observer member of the Liberal International in 2007, and later a full member in 2009.

== History ==
=== Founding ===
In 2011, the CWP and the MGP, with a single seat, decided to merge into the Civil Will–Green Party during its 7th Congress. Following the merger, the new party held two seats in the State Great Khural–party chairman Dangaasürengiin Enkhbat and first deputy chairwoman Sanjaasürengiin Oyun. E. Zorigt worked as the Adviser of Nature and the Environment Affairs to then President of Mongolia Tsakhiagiin Elbegdorj.

During the 8th Party Congress of the CWP, on 28 January 2012, the party changed its name to the Civil Will–Green Party, approved the decision to have up to three chairpersons, and adopted a new flag and symbol. Dangaasuürengiin Enkhbat, Sanjaasürengiin Oyun, and Sambuugiin Demberel were elected as the party's three chairpersons. The party merger was opposed by many Green Party members, with some people blocking the party's application to the Supreme Court for a prolonged period of six months. The changes were finally submitted to the Supreme Court, which were then approved on 12 March 2012, officially founding the Civil Will–Green Party (CWGP).

=== Coalition government (2012–2016) ===
In the 2012 parliamentary election, the CWGP obtained two seats in parliament and became a part of the Government for Reform, led by the Democratic Party (DP). Party chairman Enkhbat did not run for re-election in 2012. Long-time standing leader Oyun served as Minister for Green Development and Environment. Mr. Tumenjargal, head of the youth organisation, served as Deputy Minister for Culture, Sports and Tourism. Additionally, the party obtained its very first seat in the Citizens' Representatives Khural of the Capital City during the 2012 capital elections, which were held alongside the parliamentary election. In the 2013 presidential election, despite being eligible to run, the CWGP endorsed the re-election of sitting President Tsakhiagiin Elbegdorj from the DP. In November 2014, the coalition government collapsed after Prime Minister Norovyn Altankhuyag was voted out by parliament. Succeeding premier Chimediin Saikhanbileg formed a grand coalition excluding the CWGP.

Starting from November 2015, discussions regarding a possible merger with the CWGP began to circulate within the DP. A formal proposal to lay the groundwork for the merger with the CWGP was submitted by the DP on 2 February 2016. Party leaders Zandaakhüügiin Enkhbold and Sanjaasürengiin Oyun signed a memorandum of understanding on 5 February 2016. However with the June election deadline near, the full merger didn't materialize as the DP opted to not run together with any party in April 2016. Several CWGP politicians, including chair Demberel, joined the DP as part of the agreement to support the party in May 2016. Talks for a possible big tent coalition between third parties were made by the CWGP, the Mongolian National Democratic Party (MNDP), and the Mongolian People's Revolutionary Party (MPRP). Without consensus, the alliance didn't manifest within final registration date.

=== Electoral setbacks (2016–2024) ===
On 2 May 2016, party chair Enkhbat was relieved of his position with Tserendorjiin Gankhuyag as his successor. Registration irregularities occurred on 3 May 2016, delaying the party to register its candidate later than other parties. On 7 and 9 June 2016, the CWGP was reinstated on the parliamentary ballot on June 7 and the municipal ballot on June 9 via a court decision. In the 2016 parliamentary election, the party didn't win any seats in the State Great Khural. In 2018, both Oyun and Demberel submitted their letters of resignation as party chairperson, leaving Gankhuyag the sole-party leader.

For the 2020 parliamentary election, the CWGP ran together with the Mongolian People's Revolutionary Party and the Mongolian Traditional United Party as part of the Our Coalition. The coalition won a single seat in the State Great Khural, but belonged to MPRP member Sainkhüügiin Ganbaatar. The coalition lost its sole legislator in April 2021 when Ganbaatar defected to the Democratic Party in reaction to the MPRP's merger with the ruling Mongolian People's Party (MPP). Then party chair Gankhuyag accused Ganbaatar of breaking his prior agreement to become a member of Civil Will–Green Party. With the effective dissolution of the Our Coalition, the party lost its ability to nominate its candidate for the 2021 presidential election.

In June 2023, Batyn Batbaatar succeeded Gankhuyag as the next party chairman.

=== Parliamentary return (2024–present) ===
In the 2024 parliamentary election, the CWGP fielded 60 candidates in 13 electoral districts and 12 candidates in its party list. With 73,006 party votes, the party met the minimum 5% threshold and secured four of the total 48 seats allocated by proportional representation. In June 2025, the party entered a coalition government with the ruling MPP and its coalition partner HUN Party following the resignation of Prime Minister Luvsannamsrain Oyun-Erdene during the 2025 protests. Party chair Batbaatar was appointed as Minister of Environment and Climate Change in the Zandanshatar cabinet, serving from June 2025 until its collapse in late March 2026.

== Electoral history ==
=== Presidential elections ===
Election	Party candidate	Votes	%	Result
2013	Endorsed Tsakhiagiin Elbegdorj			Elected ✓
2017	Supported Khaltmaagiin Battulga			Elected ✓
2021	Not eligible to run (Note: Political parties or coalitions with parliamentary seats are able to nominate candidates in presidential elections)			

=== State Great Khural elections ===
Election	Leader(s)			Seats		Position	Constituency		Party list		Status
Election	Leader(s)			No.	+/–	Position	Votes	%	Votes	%	Status
2012	Dangaasürengiin Enkhbat	Sanjaasürengiin Oyun	Sambuugiin Demberel	2 / 76	New	4th	112,521	4.75%	62,325	5.51%	Coalition partner (2012–2014)
2012	Dangaasürengiin Enkhbat	Sanjaasürengiin Oyun	Sambuugiin Demberel	2 / 76	New	4th	112,521	4.75%	62,325	5.51%	Opposition (2014–2016)
2016	Tserendorjiin Gankhuyag	Sanjaasürengiin Oyun	Sambuugiin Demberel	0 / 76	▼2	▼8th	6,568	0.47%			Extra-parliamentary
2020	Tserendorjiin Gankhuyag			0 / 76	0	▲3rd	323,675 (Note: Run as part of Our Coalition.)	8.10%			Extra-parliamentary
2024	Batyn Batbaatar			4 / 126	▲4	▼5th	269,582	2.88%	73,006	5.02%	Opposition (2024–2025)
2024	Batyn Batbaatar			4 / 126	▲4	▼5th	269,582	2.88%	73,006	5.02%	Coalition partner (2025–2026)
2024	Batyn Batbaatar			4 / 126	▲4	▼5th	269,582	2.88%	73,006	5.02%	Opposition (since 2026)
