= Sainkhüügiin Ganbaatar =

Mongolian politician and Member of the State Great Khural

Sainkhuugiin Ganbaatar
- Сайнхүүгийн Ганбаатар
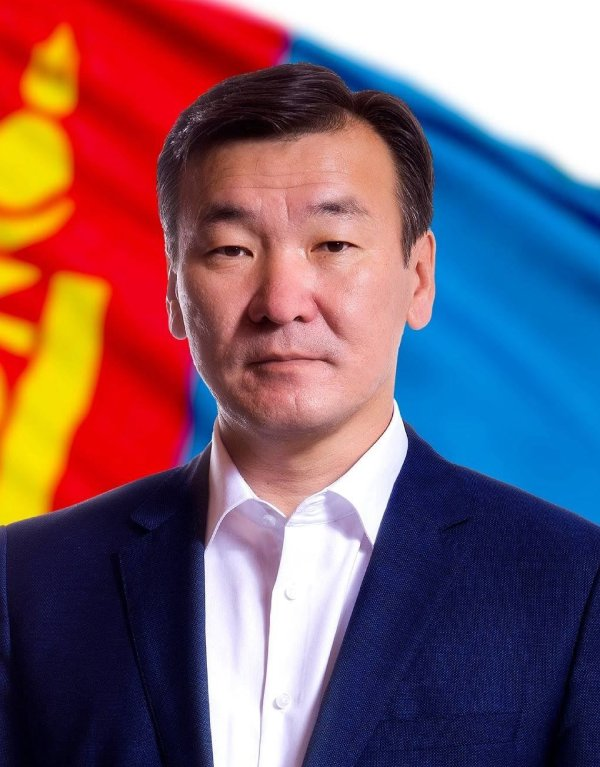
- Ganbaatar in 2017

Member of the State Great Khural
- Incumbent
- Assumed office 30 June 2020
- Constituency: 1st, Arkhangai, Övörkhangai, Bayankhongor Provinces (2024–present); 20th, Orkhon Province (2020–2024)
- In office July 2012 – July 2016
- Constituency: 19th, Darkhan-Uul Province (2012–2016)

Personal details
- Born: 30 July 1970 (age 56) Bayankhongor, Bayankhongor, Mongolia
- Party: Democratic Party (2021–present)
- Other political affiliations: Independent (2012–2016); National Labour Party (2016); Mongolian People's Revolutionary Party (2017–2021)
- Spouse: Baljinnyamyn Tungalag

Sainkhuugiin Ganbaatar (Mongolian: Сайнхүүгийн Ганбаатар; born 30 July 1970) is a Mongolian politician and trade union leader who has been serving as a member of the State Great Khural (parliament) since 2020. Ganbaatar was elected to the State Great Khural in 2012, 2020, and most recently 2024. He previously ran for the presidency in 2017 as a third-party candidate but failed to progress to the second round by a small margin.

== Early life and education ==
Ganbaatar was born in Bayankhongor, the provincial capital of Bayankhongor Province, on 30 July 1970. He spent much of his childhood in Darkhan city and studied at the No.9 Secondary School of Darkhan until 1985. Ganbaatar completed his 10-year secondary education at the No.1 Secondary School of Bayankhongor, his home town, in 1988.

According to his official resume, He enrolled at a preparatory course for German engineering program at the National University of Mongolia between 1988 and 1989. Later, he studied at the Faculty of Geology at the Polytechnic University of Mongolia from 1989 to 1991, and the Siberian State University of Geosystems and Technologies from 1991 to 1993. Ganbaatar graduated the University of Labour in Ulaanbaatar with a master's degree in Economics in 2010.

Howerver, the credentials of his tertiary education has been widely scrutinized.

Ganbaatar became the president of the Confederation of Mongolian Trade Unions, the only national trade union center, in mid 2007. He served as trade union leader and head of the Education and Science trade union federation until 2012.

== Political career ==
Ganbaatar was elected to the State Great Khural as an independent from Darkhan-Uul Province in 2012. During his parliamentary tenure, he joined the National Labour Party and briefly served as its party chairman from January 2016. He left the National Labour Party in May and ran as the "United Patriots Coalition"' candidate for the 2016 parliamentary election. He lost his re-election in the 43th Darkhan-Uul Constituency.

He would later join the Mongolian People's Revolutionary Party (MPRP) and became the MPRP's nominee for President of Mongolia in the 2017.

In his presidential campaign, Ganbaatar campaigned mainly on resource nationalism. Prior to and during his candidacy, he positioned himself against the political establishment and duopoly. Ganbaatar ranked 3rd place and received 30.61% of the popular vote. Despite his significant performance, Ganbaatar was narrowly eliminated out of the race, falling short of the Mongolian People's Party (MPP) candidate Miyeegombyn Enkhbold by just 0.14%.

In the second round of voting, Ganbaatar amplified a "White Choice" (Mongolian: Цагаан сонголт) campaign calling the public to cast a blank vote, so as to have none of the remaining candidates reach the 50% threshold needed, leading to a new election. While not a campaign for a candidate, it was nonetheless ruled by the election commission as an electoral campaign, and thus forbidden. In the second round, a record of 99,494 blank votes were gathered, totalling 8.24% of the total of valid votes, falling close to the intended result by a few thousand votes.

Ganbaatar was elected again to the State Great Khural in the 2020 parliamentary election, becoming the only politician from the Our Coalition to win a parliamentary seat. However, he would leave the MPRP in April 2021, following their merger with the ruling MPP and joined the opposition Democratic Party (DP). He was re-elected to parliament from the DP in the 2024 parliamentary election.

== Awards ==
- Mongolia: Order of the Polar Star (2014)

== Electoral history ==
| Election | Constituency | Party | Votes | Result |
|---|---|---|---|---|
| 2012 | 19th, Darkhan-Uul Province | Independent | 22,465 | Elected |
| 2016 | 43rd, Darkhan-Uul Province | United Patriots Coalition | 4,365 | Not elected |
| 2020 | 20th, Orkhon Province | Our Coalition | 17,034 | Elected |
| 2024 | 1st, Arkhangai, Bayankhongor, Övörkhangai | Democratic | 61,824 | Elected |

=== Presidential elections ===
| Election | Party | Votes | % | Result |
|---|---|---|---|---|
| 2017 | Mongolian People's Revolutionary Party | 409,899 | 30.61% | Not qualified for second round |
