= Right Person Electorate Coalition =

Political party alliance in Mongolia

Right Person Electorate Coalition Зөв Хүн Электорат Эвсэл
- Abbreviation: RPEC (English); ЗХЭЭ (Mongolian)
- Leader: Badrakhyn Naidalaa
- Chairperson of the Board of Directors: Togmidyn Dorjkhand
- Founded: 21 March 2020
- Dissolved: 2 July 2024 (In accordance with the law)
- Headquarters: Ulaanbaatar
- Ideology: Big tent Factions: Social democracy Liberalism
- Political position: Centre; Factions: Centre-left to centre-right
- Coalition parties: National Labour Party; Mongolian Social Democratic Party; Justice Party
- Colors: Purple
- Slogan: Зөвхөн зөв хүн ("Only the right person")
- State Great Khural (2020-2024): 1 / 76

The Right Person Electorate Coalition (Mongolian: Зөв Хүн Электорат Эвсэл, romanized: Zöv Khün Elektorat Evsel, ZKEE) was a political alliance in Mongolia established in 2020 by the National Labour Party, Mongolian Social Democratic Party and Justice Party.

According to its statement, the alliance sought to correct the distortions of the system in Mongolia, build a humane and happy society that respected fundamental national interests, history, culture, traditions and unity, human development, the rule of law, justice and social security. The Electorate Movement, which has the motto of "supporting the right people", has expressed its support for the coalition. According to Mongolian law, the coalition is considered dissolved in 2024.

== Composition ==
Party name	Abbr.	Ideology	Position	Leader	Member of the State Great Khural (2020-2024)
National Labour Party Хөдөлмөрийн Үндэсний Нам Khödölmöriin Ündesnii Nam	NLP ХҮН	Liberalism; Economic liberalism	Centre-right	Badrakhyn Naidalaa	1 / 76
Mongolian Social Democratic Party Монголын Социал Демократ Нам Mongolyn Sotsial Demokrat Nam	MSDP МСДН	Social democracy	Centre-left	Adiyagiin Ganbaatar	0 / 76
Justice Party Зүй Ёс Нам Zui Yos Nam	JP ЗЁН	Social democracy	Centre-left	Batbayaryn Nasanbileg	0 / 76

== Results ==
=== Presidential elections ===
Election	Party candidate	Votes	%	Result
2021	Dangaasürengiin Enkhbat	242,692	21.4%	Lost ✗

=== State Great Khural elections ===
Year	Candidate	Constituency	Vote	Vote %	Seats
2020	Togmidyn Dorjkhand	Khan-Uul District	24,449	27.5%	1 / 76

In 2020 Mongolian legislative election, the coalition nominated 53 candidates in 29 constituencies. Only one candidate in the 29th constituency in Khan-Uul District, Togmidyn Dorjkhand, won a mandate in the State Great Khural.
