= HUN Party =

Political party in Mongolia

HUN Party ХҮН нам
- Abbreviation: ХҮН
- Chairperson: Togmidyn Dorjkhand
- Secretary-General: Pürevjavyn Ganzorig
- Founded: 5 November 2011
- Headquarters: Ulaanbaatar
- Ideology: Liberalism; Pragmatism
- Political position: Centre-right
- National affiliation: Right Person Electorate Coalition (2020–2024)
- Colors: Purple
- Slogan: For the Mongolian people (English); Монгол хүний төлөө (Mongolian)
- State Great Khural: 7 / 126
- Provincial Governors: 0 / 21
- Ulaanbaatar District Governors: 0 / 9

Party flag
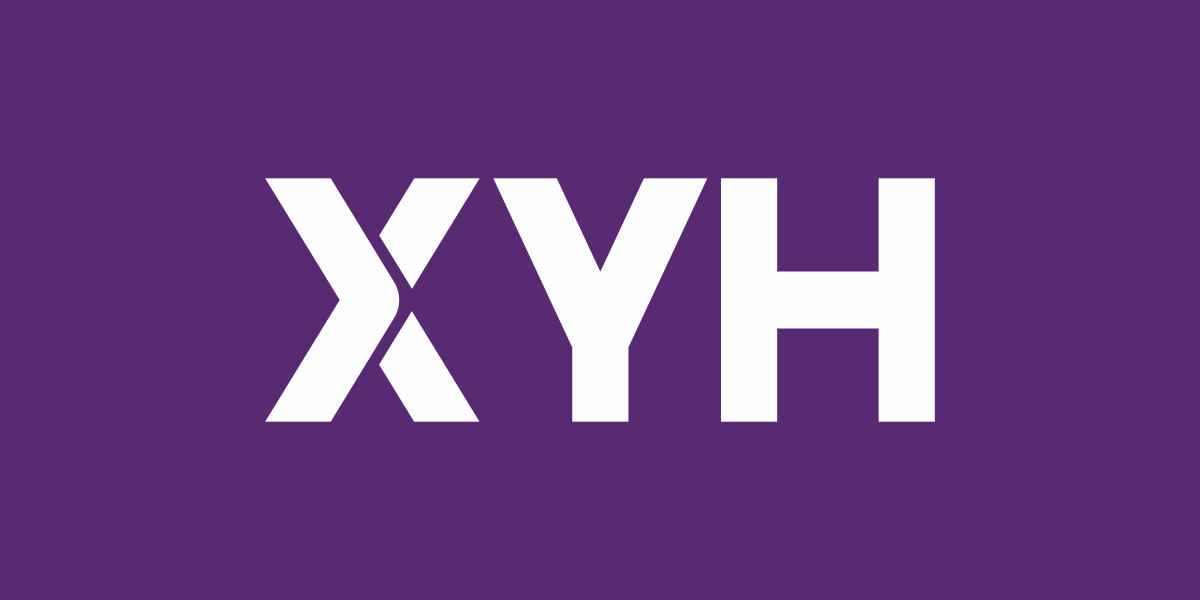

Website
- hunnam.mn

HUN Party (Mongolian: ХҮН нам, romanized: Khün nam, lit. 'Human Party' or 'People's Party') is a centre-right political party in Mongolia. Founded in 2011, as the National Labour Party (Mongolian: Хөдөлмөрийн Үндэсний Нам, romanized: Khödölmöriin Ündesnii Nam), the party branded itself in 2021 as a newcomer to Mongolian politics with an emphasis on human-centred policies, anti-corruption, and transparency.

== History ==
The National Labour Party was founded and officially registered by the Supreme Court of Mongolia on 5 November 2011.

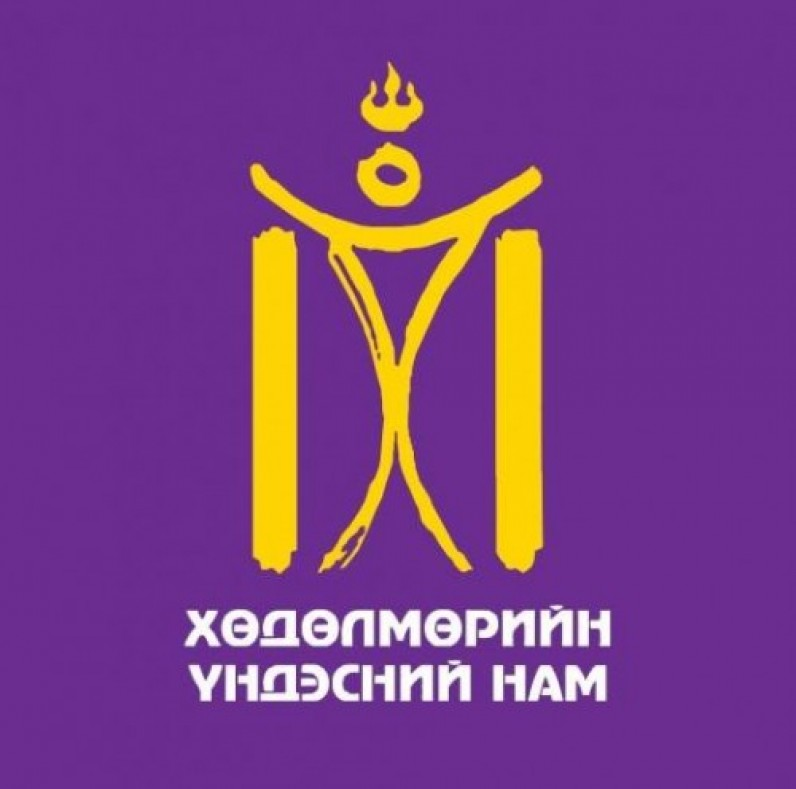
Logo of the National Labour Party from 2011 to 2022

On 29 December 2015, Sainkhüügiin Ganbaatar, an independent member of the State Great Khural, joined the NLP, and with him, the party got its first seat in parliament. He was nominated with 98% of the 300 votes as the next party chairman. However, a scandal about the authenticity of Ganbaatar's diploma and biography led to a leadership feud between him and party board member Badrakhyn Naidalaa. Prior to the 2016 parliamentary election, Naidalaa and then-party secretary Togmidyn Dorjkhand reformed the party, and nominated Naidalaa as the party chairman. Both nominations were rejected by the Supreme Court, leaving then-registered chairman Surenkhüügiin Borgil as the legitimate party leader.

The party was unable to run in the 2016 parliamentary elections, allegedly due to the General Election Commission of Mongolia receiving two different materials, one being false documents and the other being incomplete. The party nominated its candidates, including party chairman Borgil, as independents. No NLP members were elected into the State Great Khural.

In the aftermath of the 2018 anti-government protests, which exposed a cabal between senior government officials from the ruling Mongolian People's Party (MPP) and the opposition Democratic Party (DP), the NLP started gaining traction among the public as a possible third-party opposition. The 2021 merger of ex-President Nambaryn Enkhbayar's MPRP, which previously had been the third largest party, with the MPP, the split of the Democratic Party (DP), the main opposition to the MPP, into pro- and anti-Battulga factions.

In the 2020 parliamentary election and the 2021 presidential election, the party performed well among young people in urban areas. The NLP was regarded as a progressive outfit of young and well-educated Mongolian professionals, and was also popular among Mongolian expats who heavily supported the party from abroad.

In the 2020 parliamentary election, it formed an electoral coalition called the Right Person Electorate Coalition with the Mongolian Social Democratic Party and the Justice Party. The coalition secured one out of 76 seats in the State Great Khural. The party's then-only MP Togmidyn Dorjkhand succeeded Badrakhyn Naidalaa as the next party chairman during an online party congress in January 2021.

In the 2021 presidential election, the coalition came in second place with over 20% of the total ballots, outnumbering the DP as the main rival to the MPP for the first time in Mongolia's politics. Dangaasurengiin Enkhbat, the party's presidential nominee, won over 75% of the expat vote.

In May 2022, the National Labour Party changed its party name to the HUN Party and declared its political position as centre-right. Later in the 2024 parliamentary elections, the HUN Party would win 8 out of 126 seats in the expanded State Great Khural and became the third-largest party with parliamentary representation. The HUN Party signed a memorandum of understanding with the MPP and the DP on 8 July 2024, effectively forming a coalition government with the two parties. The party remained a coalition partner to the MPP after the 2025 anti-government protests, which led to the resignation of Prime Minister Luvsannamsrain Oyun-Erdene and the collapse of the coalition government. Following the collapse of the Oyun-Erdene cabinet, MP Jargalsaikhany Zoljargal renounced his party membership due to disagreements with the party's role in government in the summer of 2025. He formally withdrew and became a non-partisan on 3 December 2025, reducing the total HUN Party seats from 8 to 7.

== Name ==
Originally, the party's name, HUN, was an acronym for the full name of the party, the National Labour Party (translated into Mongolian as Hudulmuriin Undesnii Nam). It is also the Mongolian word for human and person (in Mongolian, plural form does not have to be explicit, i.e. the word hun can be used both as a singular person and as a plural people). However, the 7th Congress of the HUN Party decided to drop the meaning of the acronym to reflect the shift in the party's transformation into a centre-right political party.

== Electoral history ==
=== Presidential election ===
Election	Party candidate	Votes	%	Result
2021	Dangaasürengiin Enkhbat	242,692	21.4%	Lost ✗

=== State Great Khural elections ===
Election	Leader	Seats		Position	Constituency		Party list		Status
Election	Leader	No.	+/–	Position	Votes	%	Votes	%	Status
2020 (Note: Run as part of the Right Person Electorate Coalition.)	Badrakhyn Naidalaa	1 / 76	New	5th	209,104	5.23%			Opposition
2024	Togmidyn Dorjkhand	8 / 126	▲7	▲3rd	636,648	6.80%	151,111	10.38%	Coalition government
