= Mongolian Traditional United Party =

Political party in Mongolia

Mongolian Traditional United Party Монголын Уламжлалын Нэгдсэн Нам
- Abbreviation: MTUP (English); МУНН (Mongolian)
- Chairperson: Batdelgeriin Batbold
- General secretary: Lkhagvasürengiin Önörbayar
- Founded: 5 December 1993
- Merger of: Mongolian Party for Independence; Mongolian United Party of Cattle Breeders and Peasants; Mongolian United Party of Private Owners
- Headquarters: Ulaanbaatar
- Membership: 1503
- Ideology: National conservatism Mongolian nationalism
- Political position: Right-wing
- Colors: Blue
- State Great Khural: 0 / 126

Party flag

Website
- Official Facebook page

The Mongolian Traditional United Party (MTUP; Mongolian: Монголын Уламжлалын Нэгдсэн Нам, Mongolian script: ᠮᠣᠩᠭᠣᠯ ᠤᠨ
ᠤᠯᠠᠮᠵᠢᠯᠠᠯ ᠤᠨ
ᠨᠢᠭᠡᠳᠦᠭᠰᠡᠨ ᠨᠠᠮ, Mongolyn Ulamjlalyn Negdsen Nam) is a national-conservative political party in Mongolia founded in 1993.

== History ==
On 5 December 1993, the Mongolian Party for Independence, the Mongolian United Party of Cattle Breeders and Peasants, and the Mongolian United Party of Private Owners merged to form the Mongolian Traditional United Party.

For the 1996 parliamentary election, the party nominated 16 candidates, but only Ochirbatyn Dashbalbar was elected to the State Great Khural. As a parliamentary party, it nominated former Chairperson of the People's Great Khural Jambyn Gombojav in the 1997 presidential election, but he won only 6.6% of the vote, coming in third place. After Dashbalbar's death in 1999, poet Ürjingiin Khurelbaatar became the party's chairperson. In 2006, he was replaced by general secretary Batdelgeriin Batbold.

=== Our coalition ===
In March 2020, the MTUP, alongside the Mongolian People's Revolutionary Party (MPRP) and Civil Will–Green Party, formed the Our Coalition to run in the 2020 parliamentary election. The coalition won a single seat in the State Great Khural, which belonged to the MPRP candidate. The alliance effectively dissolved in May 2021 following the merger of the MPRP with the ruling Mongolian People's Party.

== Electoral history ==
=== Presidential elections ===
Election	Party candidate	Votes	%	Result
1997	Jambyn Gombojav	65,201	6.64%	Lost ✗

=== State Great Khural elections ===
Election	Party leader	Votes	%	Seats	+/–	Position	Government
1996	Ochirbatyn Dashbalbar	18,135	1.71%	1 / 76	New	5th	Opposition
2000 (Note: Run as part of the Grand Coalition.)	Ürjingiin Khürelbaatar	9,105	0.91%	0 / 76	▼1	▼8th	Extra-parliamentary
2004	Ürjingiin Khürelbaatar	6,097	0.59%	0 / 76	Steady	▲4th	Extra-parliamentary
2008	Batdelgeriin Batbold	12,081	1.02%	0 / 76	Steady	—	Extra-parliamentary
2012	Batdelgeriin Batbold	6,507	0.58%	0 / 76	Steady	▼8th	Extra-parliamentary
2016	Batdelgeriin Batbold	3,283	0.23%	0 / 76	Steady	▼11th	Extra-parliamentary
2020 (Note: Run as part of the Our Coalition.)	Batdelgeriin Batbold	323,675	8.10%	0 / 76	Steady	▲4th	Extra-parliamentary
2024 (Note: Run as part of the New United Coalition with the NEW Party.)	Batdelgeriin Batbold	69,682	4.79%	0 / 126	Steady	▼6th	Extra-parliamentary
