= Togmidyn Dorjkhand =

Mongolian politician (born 1977)

- Тогмидын Доржханд
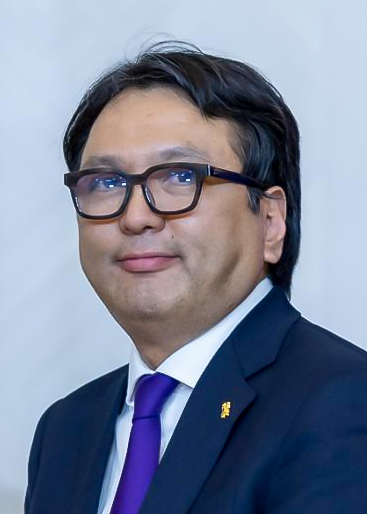
- Dorjkhand in 2020

Deputy Prime Minister of Mongolia
- Incumbent
- Assumed office 10 July 2024
- Prime Minister: Luvsannamsrain Oyun-Erdene; Gombojavyn Zandanshatar
- Preceded by: Amarsaikhan Sainbuyan; Chimediin Khürelbaatar

Member of the State Great Khural
- Incumbent
- Assumed office 30 June 2020
- Constituency: Closed list (2024–2028); 29th, Khan-Uul District, Ulaanbaatar (2020–2024)

Chairman of the HUN Party
- Incumbent
- Assumed office 15 January 2021
- Preceded by: Badrakhyn Naidalaa

Personal details
- Born: 1977 (age 48–49) Ulaanbaatar, Mongolia
- Party: HUN Party
- Education: National University of Mongolia (1999); Hitotsubashi University (2004)

Togmidyn Dorjkhand (Note: Mongolian: Тогмидын Доржханд, IPA: [tʰɔɢmʲiˈtiːŋ ˈtɔrtʃxənt]) (born 1977) is a Mongolian politician, serving as the Deputy Prime Minister of Mongolia, member of the parliament (MP) and chairman of the HUN Party. He has been serving in the parliament since 2020; originally elected from the Right Person Electorate Coalition.

== Early career ==
His career in the 2000s is characterised by his role in the Ministry of Treasury as a financial specialist. After graduating from the National University of Mongolia with a Bachelor's degree in Finance in 1999, he joined the Ministry of Treasury, first as Strategy and Management Specialist in the Procurement Department in 2001, then as Budget Policy Specialist directly under the Minister. In 2003, he went to Japan to obtain a Master's degree in State Economic Policy in Hitotsubashi University in Tokyo while interning at Japan's finance ministry.

In the early 2010s, he started looking abroad for economic development examples by studying at Harvard University and the University of Oxford and working with the Asian Development Bank and the International Monetary Fund on various projects. In 2015, he entered the politics by joining the HUN Party (then National Labour Party) on a platform for fighting corruption, efficiency in the public sector, quality health care, education and effective social policies.

== Political career ==
The NLP steadily gained ground in the recent years, and it was the only non-mainstream party with a seat in the State Great Khural and Municipal Councils from 2020 to 2024. When the Democratic Party (DP) split into anti and pro-Battulga factions in 2021, many dissatisfied voters and non-partisan affiliates turned to the NLP, which was illustrated by its electoral performance in the 2021 presidential election. In the presidential election, it placed second by a vote share of around 25%, outrunning the DP, which has been the main opposition to the Mongolian People's Party (MPP) for over 30 years.

In January 2021, Dorjkhand succeeded then-party chairman Badrakhyn Naidalaa as the next chairman of the NLP. Under his leadership, the party changed its name to the HUN Party, changed its political position from centre-left to centre-right politics and rebranded itself to the public. In the next 2024 parliamentary election, the HUN party would win 8 out of 126 seat in the expanded State Great Khural and would be a part of a new coalition government led by the MPP in July. He became the Deputy PM of Mongolia.

His position on the potential expansion on the number of seats on the Mongolian State Great Khural had levied criticism from both civic society and the political scenes alike.
