= Mongolian People's Revolutionary Party (2010) =

Political party in Mongolia (2010–2021)

Mongolian People's Revolutionary Party Монгол Ардын Хувьсгалт Нам
- Abbreviation: MPRP (English); МАХН (Mongolian)
- Chairperson: Nambaryn Enkhbayar
- Secretary-General: Buyaagiin Tulga
- Vice chairperson: Tserendashiin Oyunbaatar
- Founded: 8 November 2010
- Dissolved: 28 May 2021
- Split from: Mongolian People's Party
- Merged into: Mongolian People's Party
- Headquarters: Ulaanbaatar
- Newspaper: Зууны мэдээ (Century's News)
- Student wing: National Revolutionary United Student Union of Justice
- Youth wing: Democracy Justice Mongolian Youth Union
- Women's wing: Democracy Justice Mongolian Women's Union
- Membership (2012): 80,000
- Ideology: Social democracy; Left-wing populism; Resource nationalism
- Political position: Centre-left to left-wing
- National affiliation: Justice Coalition (2012–2016); Our Coalition (2020)
- International affiliation: Progressive Alliance
- Colours: Red; Blue

Party flag
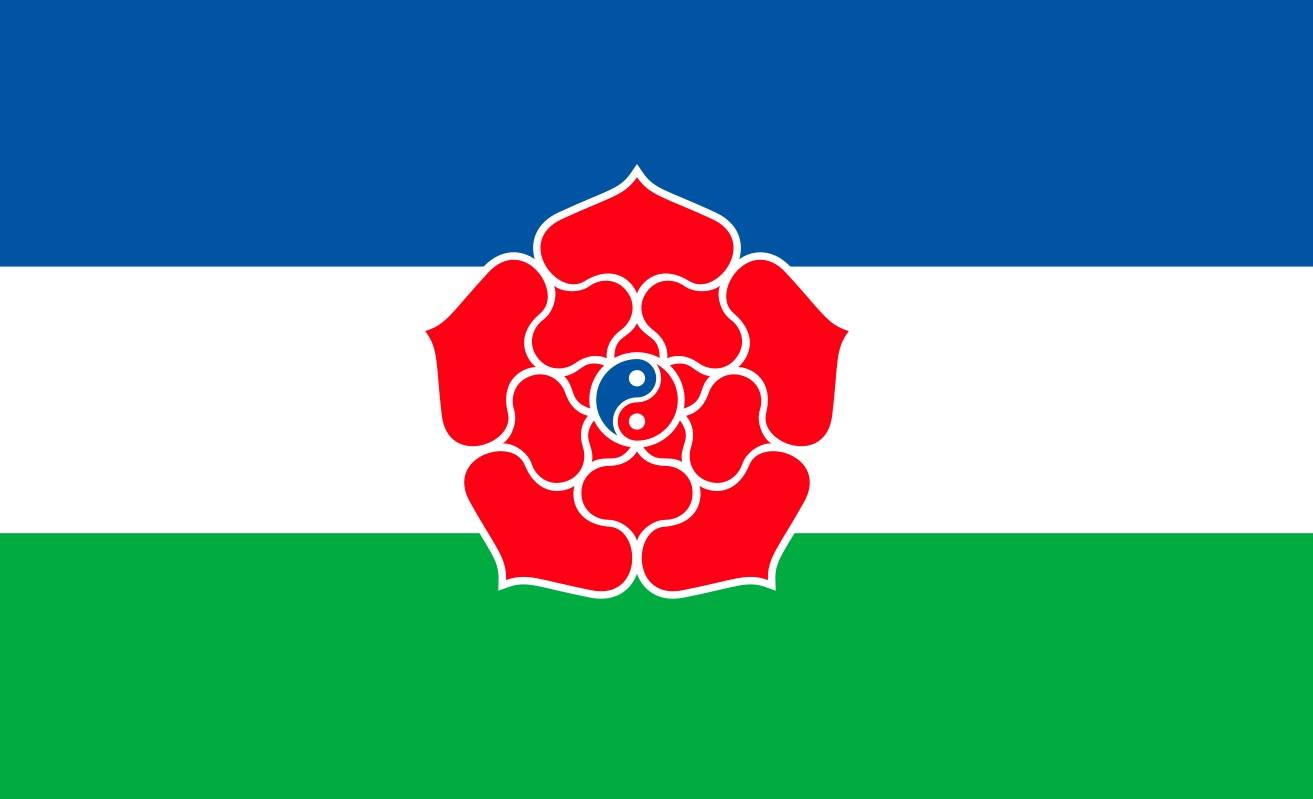

Website
- www.maxh.mn

The Mongolian People's Revolutionary Party (MPRP; Mongolian: Монгол Ардын Хувьсгалт Нам, romanized: Mongol Ardyn Khuvisgalt Nam) was a political party in Mongolia which was founded in 2010 by former president Nambaryn Enkhbayar and remained in existence for a little over a decade.

The party received approval to use the Mongolian People's Party's old name by the Supreme Court of Mongolia in June 2011. Enkhbayar, a former Chairman of the original MPRP, a former Prime Minister of Mongolia and a former President of Mongolia, was the party's only chairman.

The MPRP merged with the Mongolian People's Party (MPP) in May 2021.

== Ideology ==
The party's stated mission was to:

1. Dismantle the oligopoly
2. Give more authority to the people
3. Give the people Mongolia's natural wealth
4. Provide employment and property for every household

The MPRP believed that with the implementation of these integrated policies—aimed at creating human-centered social welfare, economic development and citizen-oriented governance—Mongolia and its people would achieve prosperity and progress.

The MPRP, along with the Democratic Party, advocated for restrictions on the number of years a foreign firm can operate in Mongolia, and called for new industrial mining projects to be fully Mongolian-controlled. Some observers labelled the party "populist" on account of this position. The MPRP campaigned on the platform of "resource nationalism" in the 2012 parliamentary election.

== History ==
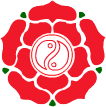
Initial logo of the MPRP during its early years.

=== Founding ===
The topic of changing the name, symbol, and ideology of the MPRP in post-communist Mongolia has been a subject of debate since the 1990s. During the 26th Party Congress of the MPRP in November 2010, it was ultimately decided that the party would revert back to its original name "Mongolian People's Party" and ideologically shift from democratic socialism to social democracy.

This decision was not popular among all factions within the MPRP and its 150,000 party members. Ultimately, it led to the party splitting into the MPP and MPRP, the latter led by former president, former prime minister and former MPRP chairman Nambaryn Enkhbayar. Enkhbayar's splinter party was officially permitted to use the name "Mongolian People's Revolutionary Party" by the Supreme Court of Mongolia on 24 June 2011.

=== Justice Coalition ===
In May 2012, the MPRP formed the Justice Coalition with the Mongolian National Democratic Party (MNDP), a splinter of the Democratic Party (DP) founded in 2005, to run for the upcoming 2012 legislative elections. The coalition, led by the MPRP, won 11 of the 76 seats in the State Great Khural and became a junior coalition partner with the governing DP.

Prior to the election, the election commission rejected party chairman Enkhbayar's son, Enkhbayaryn Batshugar who ranked fifth, from the coalition's party list candidates. The rejection of Batshugar allowed the election of Tserendashiin Oyuunbaatar, who ranked 7th on the modified party list. However, the party, interested in appointing Batshugar as MP, prevented Oyuunbaatar from being sworn in on the basis that he wasn't a registered MPRP member. In December 2012, the MPRP made a failed attempt to push for Batshugar's parliamentary seat. Oyuunbaatar was eventually sworn in to parliament as the 74th MP on 28 December 2012.

The coalition gradually broke up as MNDP and MPRP members of parliament crossed the floor to the DP and MPP. It was officially dissolved in accordance with the law in June 2016, with four remaining seats.

The MPRP ran independently in the 2016 parliamentary elections and won only a single seat in the State Great Khural. Oktyabriin Baasankhüü was elected as the party's only lawmaker from the 47th constituency in Orkhon Province. With parliamentary representation, the party became constitutionally eligible to nominate a candidate for the upcoming 2017 presidential election.

=== 2017 presidential election ===
On 5 May 2017, the MPRP selected former president and party leader Nambaryn Enkhbayar as its candidate at the XVI Party Congress of the MPRP. Enkhbayar's candidacy was refused by the General Election Commission due to his corruption charges and residency abroad between April 2013 and October 2014, which broke the requirement of residing in Mongolia for the last 5 years. As a result, the MPRP selected a non-party member, Sainkhuugiin Ganbaatar, as its candidate on 16 May. Prior on 6 May, Ganbaatar, a well-known populist, did not rule out the possibility of running as the MPRP candidate on a TV9 broadcast. The party's only legislator, Baasankhüü, opposed Ganbaatar's nomination and left the party on 17 May.

Ganbaatar was officially registered on 18 May in a three-way presidential race. He campaigned on resource nationalism, and effectively split the vote for the MPP, which caused DP candidate Khaltmaagiin Battulga to lead. In the first round, Ganbaatar placed third with only 0.2% vote difference, causing him to be eliminated from the race. Consequently, Ganbaatar campaigned on blank voting in the second round to hold new elections. During a press conference on 30 June, Ganbaatar stated that if new elections are held, the MPRP leadership will nominate new candidates. In the second round, 99,494 blank votes were gathered, totalling 8.24% of the valid vote, falling close to the intended result by a few thousand votes.

=== 2020 parliamentary election ===
In January 2020, the MPRP signed a memorandum of understanding (MoU) with the Mongolian Green Party to run together for the 2020 parliamentary election. Both parties rallied other third parties to join forces against the "duopoly of the Mongolian People's Party and Democratic Party." Later on 13 March 2020, the MPRP and the Civil Will–Green Party (CWGP) signed an MoU and announced to run in a coalition during a joint press conference.

In May 2020, the MPRP, the CWGP, and the Mongolian Traditional United Party formed the Our Coalition for the 2020 election. The coalition won a single seat in the State Great Khural, which belonged to the party's 2017 presidential nominee Sainkhuugiin Ganbaatar. However, he would join the Democratic Party in 2021, when the MPRP and the MPP decided to strategically unite for the upcoming 2021 presidential election.

=== Merger with the Mongolian People's Party ===
On 29 April 2021, the year which commemorated the 100 Year Anniversary of the Mongolian People's Party, the MPRP and the MPP signed an agreement to merge the two parties. The MPRP was deregistered by the Supreme Court on 28 May 2021.

== Electoral history ==
=== Presidential election ===
Election	Party candidate	Votes	%	Result
2013	Natsagiin Udval	80,563	6.58%	Lost ✗
2017	Sainkhuugiin Ganbaatar	409,899	30.61%	not qualified for second round

=== State Great Khural elections ===
Election	Party leader	Votes	%	Seats	+/–	Position	Government
2012 (Note: Run as part of Justice Coalition.)	Nambaryn Enkhbayar	252,115	22.31%	7 / 76	New	▲3rd	Coalition government
2016	Nambaryn Enkhbayar	112,850	8.00%	1 / 76	▼6	3rd	Opposition
2020 (Note: Run as part of Our Coalition.)	Nambaryn Enkhbayar	323,675	8.10%	1 / 76	0	3rd	Opposition
