= Davaajantsangiin Sarangerel =

Mongolian politician

Member of State Great Khural
- Incumbent
- Assumed office 13 December 2012

Minister of Environment and Tourism
- In office 8 July 2020 – 21 January 2021
- President: Khaltmaagiin Battulga
- Prime Minister: Ukhnaagiin Khürelsükh

Minister of Health
- In office 4 October 2017 – 8 July 2020
- President: Khaltmaagiin Battulga
- Prime Minister: Ukhnaagiin Khürelsükh

Personal details
- Born: 1963 (age 62–63) Mongolian People's Republic
- Party: Mongolian People's Revolutionary Party

Davaajantsangiin Sarangerel (Mongolian: Даваажанцангийн Сарангэрэл) (born 1963) is a former photographer, journalist and the current Member of State Great Khural and Minister of Environment and Tourism in U.Khürelsükh's Second Cabinet. She served as Minister of Health in U.Khürelsükh's First Cabinet.

== Biography ==
Sarangerel was born in Ulaanbaatar in 1963. After finishing her schooling in 1979, she went to Russia to study photography at the Omsk State University (1983). For two years, she worked with the Montsame news agency as a photographer, before receiving her degree in journalism from the Rostov University in 1990.

Sarangerel pursued a career in journalism and in 1990 became a correspondent for the Mongolian state broadcaster, where she later became its editor-in-chief. During 1995–99, she served as the director of Mongolia's national news agency. Later, Sarangerel joined TV5 in 2003 and worked as its general director from 2003 to 2005. She has been elected the chair of United Confederation of Mongolian Journalists twice.

A member of the Mongolian People's Party, Sarangerel was elected to the State Great Khural for the first time in 2012 and after her reelection four years later was made the Health Minister in Ukhnaagiin Khürelsükh's cabinet (2017).
