= Navaan-Yundengiin Oyundari =

Mongolian politician

- Наваан-Юндэнгийн Оюундарь
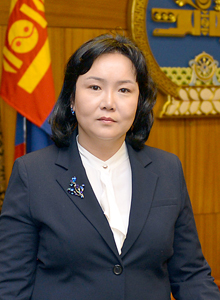

(Mongolia) Vice Minister of Foreign Affairs
- In office 18 December 2014 - present

Member of Ulaanbaatar City Council
- In office 2008 – 2012

Personal details
- Party: Mongolian People's Party
- Education: "Сэрүүлэг" дээд сургууль, Маастрихтын их сургууль
- Profession: Politician, economist
- Website: www.oyundari.mn/eng

Navaan-Yundengiin Oyundari (Mongolian: Наваан-Юндэнгийн Оюундарь) is a Mongolian politician and the Vice Minister of Foreign Affairs.

== Education ==
Oyundari graduated with distinction (gold medal) from Mongolian-Russian joint school number 3. In 1995 she received her bachelor's degree in Business administration at "Seruuleg" University and in 1998 she got an MBA from the University of Maastricht in the Netherlands.

== Career ==
Oyundari started her professional career in the Mongolian national productivity center in 1995, where she was engaged in international projects and programs. In 2000 she engaged in public service, becoming the director of External cooperation division in the Ministry of Environment. In 2004 she worked as Deputy Chairwoman of the UN Convention on biodiversity, in 2006 she worked as Middle East adviser at the UN Geneva. In 2008 to 2014 she worked as member of Ulaanbaatar City Council, elected as candidate from Mongolian People's party. From December 2014 to August 2015 she is Vice Minister of Foreign affairs.

== Social engagement ==
In 1996 she created the Baatarvan Navaan-Yunden foundation. The principal goal of the foundation is to increase Mongolians' knowledge of their history and respect for the ancestors through promoting the life and work of Baatarvan Navaan-Yunden and carrying out charity throughout the territory of the ancient Tusheet Khan province that used to be controlled by the Baatarvan of Kharaa.

From 1997 she started working as secretary of the NAMSZKH, member of MASZKh, member of Mongolian people's revolutionary party committee (from 1994) and elected as member of party caucus.
