= List of members of the State Great Khural, 2024–2028 =

List of State Great Khural members of Mongolia, elected in 2024

2024-2028 State Great Khural
←	2020–2024
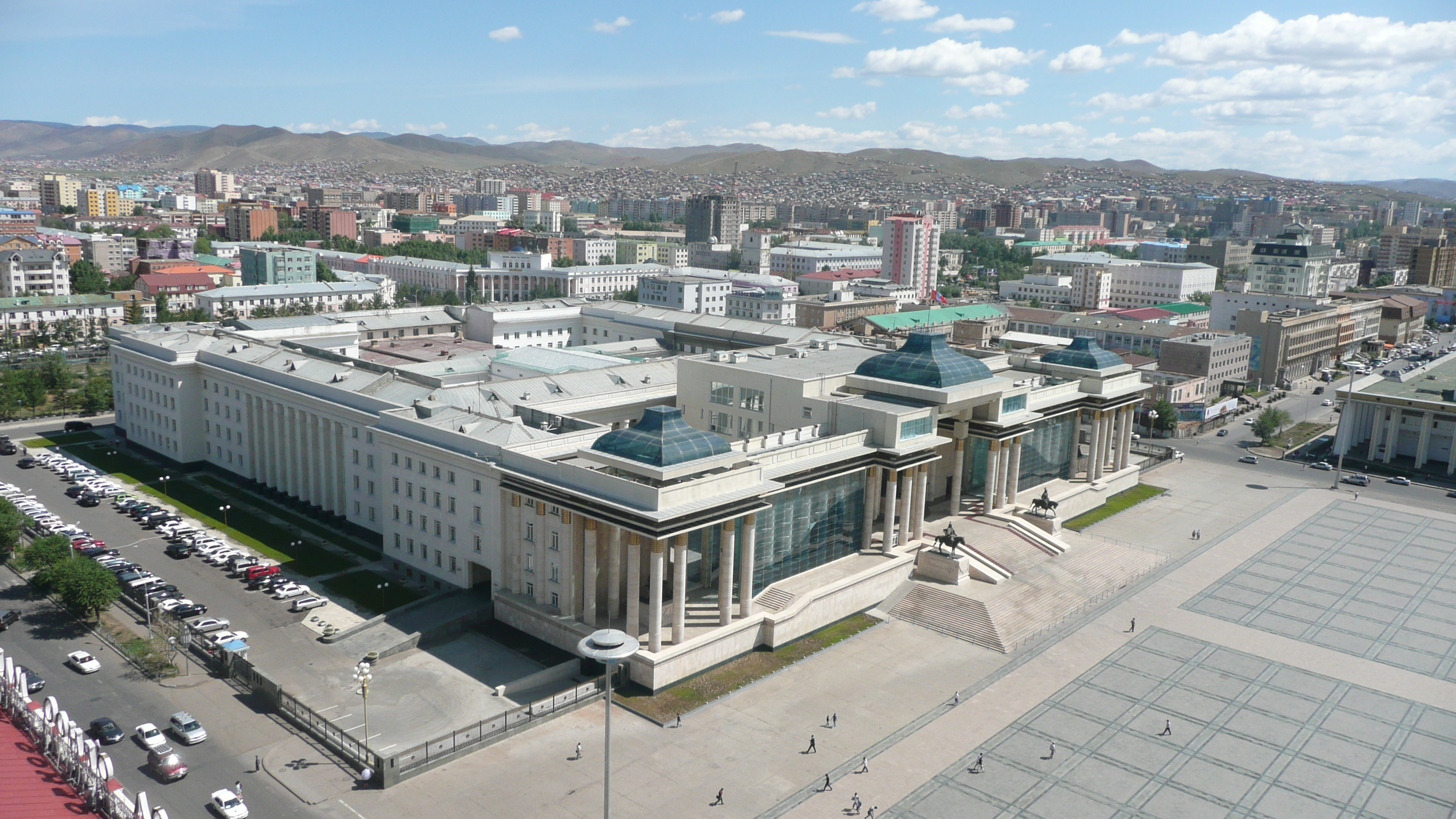
- Government Palace of Mongolia

Overview
- Legislative body: State Great Khural
- Jurisdiction: Mongolia
- Meeting place: Government Palace, Ulaanbaatar, Mongolia
- Term: 2 July 2024 – present
- Election: 28 June 2024
- Government: Oyun-Erdene II (until 13 June 2025); Zandanshatar (until 30 March 2026); Uchral cabinet: Mongolian People's Party; HUN Party; National Coalition
- Website: www.parliament.mn

State Great Khural
- Members: 126
- Chairman: Dashzegviin Amarbayasgalan (until 17 October 2025); Nyam-Osoryn Uchral (20 November 2025–30 March 2026); Sandagiin Byambatsogt (since 3 April 2026)
- Deputy Chairperson: Bökhchuluuny Pürevdorj; Khürelbaataryn Bulgantuya (until 12 November 2025); Jadambyn Bat-Erdene (since 12 November 2025)
- Prime Minister: Luvsannamsrain Oyun-Erdene (until 13 June 2025); Gombojavyn Zandanshatar (until 30 March 2026); Nyam-Osoryn Uchral (since 30 March 2026)
- Party control: Mongolian People's Party

The 2024–2028 State Great Khural is the 9th and current session of the State Great Khural. Its members were elected in the 2024 Mongolian parliamentary election and assumed office on 2 July 2024. A coalition government was formed on 8 July 2024 between the three largest parties — the Mongolian People's Party (MPP), Democratic Party (DP) and HUN Party.

The first session of the Great Khural convened on 2 July 2024, and is scheduled to be seated until July 2028.

== Composition ==
In the 2024 legislative election, 126 members of parliament were elected to the State Great Khural from four political parties and one electoral alliance, making it one of the most politically diverse parliaments in Mongolia's modern history. The ruling Mongolian People's Party won a slim majority of 68 seats and gained 6 extra seats, while the main opposition Democratic Party rose from 11 seats to 42.

Following the election, Prime Minister Luvsannamsrain Oyun-Erdene (re-appointed with a 103–1 vote) invited the opposition Democratic Party and HUN Party on July 6 to join his second cabinet. The three parties—representing a combined total of 118 MPs—signed a memorandum of understanding, officially forming a coalition government.

Party	Original elected seats			Current seats			Floor leader
Party	Con.	PR	Total	±	Total	%	Floor leader
Mongolian People's Party	50	18	68	Steady	68	54.0%	Lkhagvyn Mönkhbaatar (2024–June 2025); Jadambyn Bat-Erdene (June 2025–October 2025); Jigjidiin Batjargal (October 2025–)
Democratic Party	26	16	42	Steady	42	33.3%	Odongiin Tsogtgerel
HUN Party	2	6	8	▼	7	5.5%	—N/a
National Coalition	—N/a	4	4	Steady	4	3.2%	—N/a
Civil Will–Green Party	—N/a	4	4	Steady	4	3.2%	—N/a
Independent	—N/a	—N/a	—N/a	▲	1	0.8%	—N/a
Totals	78	48	126	—	126	100.0%	

Under Article 29.1 of the Constitution of Mongolia, only political parties or electoral alliances with 10 or more seats are allowed to form parliamentary groups. The HUN Party fell short by just 2 seats from the threshold, therefore unable to form its own parliamentary group.

== List of members ==
=== Constituency ===
78 members were elected from 13 constituencies in the 2024 parliamentary elections.

==== Provinces ====
Constituency	Member	Year of birth	Party	Term	First elected	Notes
1st Arkhangai, Bayankhongor, Övörkhangai	Oyunsaikhany Altangerel		Democratic Party	1st	2024	
1st Arkhangai, Bayankhongor, Övörkhangai	Sainkhüügiin Ganbaatar	1970	Democratic Party	3rd	2012	
1st Arkhangai, Bayankhongor, Övörkhangai	Batmönkhiin Battsetseg	1973	Mongolian People's Party	1st	2024	
1st Arkhangai, Bayankhongor, Övörkhangai	Pürevbaataryn Mönkhtulga		Democratic Party	1st	2024	
1st Arkhangai, Bayankhongor, Övörkhangai	Dashdondogiin Ganbat		Democratic Party	3rd	2012	
1st Arkhangai, Bayankhongor, Övörkhangai	Ganzorigiin Temüülen	1973	Mongolian People's Party	3rd	2016	
1st Arkhangai, Bayankhongor, Övörkhangai	Ganbatyn Khosbayar		Democratic Party	1st	2024	
1st Arkhangai, Bayankhongor, Övörkhangai	Damdinsürengiin Jargalsaikhan		Democratic Party	1st	2024	
1st Arkhangai, Bayankhongor, Övörkhangai	Davaagiin Tsogtbaatar		Democratic Party	1st	2024	
2nd Govi-Altai, Khovd, Uvs, Zavkhan	Sandagiin Byambatsogt	1974	Mongolian People's Party	5th	2008	
2nd Govi-Altai, Khovd, Uvs, Zavkhan	Odongiin Tsogtgerel		Democratic Party	2nd	2020	
2nd Govi-Altai, Khovd, Uvs, Zavkhan	Dashzegviin Amarbayasgalan	1981	Mongolian People's Party	1st	2024	
2nd Govi-Altai, Khovd, Uvs, Zavkhan	Bökhchuluuny Pürevdorj	1973	Democratic Party	2nd	2020	
2nd Govi-Altai, Khovd, Uvs, Zavkhan	Battogtokhyn Choijilsüren	1970	Mongolian People's Party	5th	2008	
2nd Govi-Altai, Khovd, Uvs, Zavkhan	Banzragchiin Tüvshin	1975	Democratic Party	1st	2024	
2nd Govi-Altai, Khovd, Uvs, Zavkhan	Ochirbatyn Amgalanbaatar		Democratic Party	1st	2024	
2nd Govi-Altai, Khovd, Uvs, Zavkhan	Batjargalyn Zayaabal		Mongolian People's Party	1st	2024	
2nd Govi-Altai, Khovd, Uvs, Zavkhan	Zagdjavyn Mendsaikhan	1979	Mongolian People's Party	1st	2024	
2nd Govi-Altai, Khovd, Uvs, Zavkhan	Enkhbatyn Bolormaa	1988	Mongolian People's Party	1st	2024	
3rd Bayan-Ölgii	Khajyekbyeriin Jangabyl		Mongolian People's Party	1st	2024	
3rd Bayan-Ölgii	Tilyeukhany Aubakir	1976	Mongolian People's Party	2nd	2020	
3rd Bayan-Ölgii	Bulany Byeisyen	1963	Democratic Party	2nd	2020	
4th Bulgan Khövsgöl Orkhon	Khaltmaagiin Battulga	1963	Democratic Party	4th	2004	5th President of Mongolia, served in 2017–2021. The first person to serve as a member of parliament after the president's duty in Mongolian politics.
4th Bulgan Khövsgöl Orkhon	Luvsantserengiin Enkh-Amgalan	1970	Mongolian People's Party	4th	2012	
4th Bulgan Khövsgöl Orkhon	Dambyn Batlut	1974	Mongolian People's Party	2nd	2020	
4th Bulgan Khövsgöl Orkhon	Bat-Ölziin Bat-Erdene	1977	Mongolian People's Party	1st	2024	
4th Bulgan Khövsgöl Orkhon	Dorjsürengiin Üüriintuyaa		Mongolian People's Party	1st	2024	
4th Bulgan Khövsgöl Orkhon	Lkhagvyn Mönkhbaatar	1977	Mongolian People's Party	3rd	2016	
4th Bulgan Khövsgöl Orkhon	Jadambyn Bat-Erdene	1965	Mongolian People's Party	3rd	2016	
4th Bulgan Khövsgöl Orkhon	Tserenpiliin Davaasüren	1964	Mongolian People's Party	5th	2008	
5th Darkhan-Uul Selenge Töv	Boldyn Javkhlan	1975	Mongolian People's Party	3rd	2016	
5th Darkhan-Uul Selenge Töv	Tsevegdorjiin Tuvaan	1972	Democratic Party	2nd	2020	
5th Darkhan-Uul Selenge Töv	Dalain Batbayar		Democratic Party	1st	2024	
5th Darkhan-Uul Selenge Töv	Jadambyn Enkhbayar	1973	Mongolian People's Party	4th	2008	
5th Darkhan-Uul Selenge Töv	Buyaagiin Tulga	1980	Mongolian People's Party	1st	2024	
5th Darkhan-Uul Selenge Töv	Gongoryn Damdinnyam	1982	Mongolian People's Party	2nd	2020	
5th Darkhan-Uul Selenge Töv	Sükhbaataryn Erdenebold	1984	Democratic Party	1st	2024	
5th Darkhan-Uul Selenge Töv	Sürenjavyn Lündeg		Mongolian People's Party	1st	2024	
5th Darkhan-Uul Selenge Töv	Chinbatyn Undram	1982	Mongolian People's Party	2nd	2020	
5th Darkhan-Uul Selenge Töv	Jigjidiin Batjargal	1967	Mongolian People's Party	2nd	2020	
6th Dornod Khentii Sükhbaatar	Luvsannamsrain Oyun-Erdene	1980	Mongolian People's Party	3rd	2016	Prime Minister of Mongolia from 2021 to 2025. Chairperson of the Mongolian People's Party
6th Dornod Khentii Sükhbaatar	Myagmarsürengiin Badamsüren		Mongolian People's Party	1st	2024	
6th Dornod Khentii Sükhbaatar	Tsagaankhüügiin Iderbat	1981	Mongolian People's Party	2nd	2021	
6th Dornod Khentii Sükhbaatar	Ukhnaagiin Otgonbayar		Mongolian People's Party	1st	2024	
6th Dornod Khentii Sükhbaatar	Lkhagvasürengiin Soronzonbold		Mongolian People's Party	1st	2024	
6th Dornod Khentii Sükhbaatar	Shinebayaryn Byambasüren	1988	Democratic Party	1st	2024	
6th Dornod Khentii Sükhbaatar	Möngöntsogiin Gankhüleg	1990	Mongolian People's Party	1st	2024	
7th Dornogovi Dundgovi Govisümber Ömnögovi	Renchinbyambyn Seddorj		Democratic Party	1st	2024	
7th Dornogovi Dundgovi Govisümber Ömnögovi	Borkhüügiin Delgersaikhan	1964	Mongolian People's Party	3rd	2016	
7th Dornogovi Dundgovi Govisümber Ömnögovi	Nanzadyn Naranbaatar		Mongolian People's Party	2nd	2020	
7th Dornogovi Dundgovi Govisümber Ömnögovi	Luvsanbyambaagiin Mönkhbayasgalan	1977	Democratic Party	1st	2024	
7th Dornogovi Dundgovi Govisümber Ömnögovi	Tsagaankhüügiin Mönkhbat		Democratic Party	1st	2024	
7th Dornogovi Dundgovi Govisümber Ömnögovi	Ravjikhyn Erdenebüren	1974	Democratic Party	2nd	2004	
7th Dornogovi Dundgovi Govisümber Ömnögovi	Gombyn Ganbaatar	1972	Democratic Party	1st	2024	

==== Ulaanbaatar ====
Constituency	Member	Year of birth	Party	Term	First elected	Notes
8th Bayanzürkh	Jigjidsürengiin Chinbüren	1972	Mongolian People's Party	2nd	2020	
8th Bayanzürkh	Battömöriin Enkhbayar	1977	Mongolian People's Party	2nd	2020	
8th Bayanzürkh	Pürevsürengiin Naranbayar	1976	HUN Party	1st	2024	
8th Bayanzürkh	Enkhtaivany Bat-Amgalan	1977	Mongolian People's Party	2nd	2020	
8th Bayanzürkh	Khürelbaataryn Bulgantuya	1981	Mongolian People's Party	2nd	2020	
9th Bayangol	Jargalsaikhany Zoljargal	1979	~~HUN Party~~	1st	2024	
9th Bayangol	Jargalsaikhany Zoljargal	1979	Non-partisan	1st	2024	Zoljargal left the HUN Party on 3 December 2025 due to disagreements with its governance approach.
9th Bayangol	Khassuuri Gankhuyag	1977	Mongolian People's Party	2nd	2020	
9th Bayangol	Jambalyn Ganbaatar	1973	Mongolian People's Party	3rd	2016	
10th Chingeltei Sükhbaatar	Nyam-Osoryn Uchral	1987	Mongolian People's Party	3rd	2016	
10th Chingeltei Sükhbaatar	Otgonsharyn Batnairamdal	1984	Mongolian People's Party	1st	2024	
10th Chingeltei Sükhbaatar	Tsendiin Baatarkhüü	1981	Democratic Party	1st	2024	
10th Chingeltei Sükhbaatar	Natsagdorjiin Batsümberel	1983	Mongolian People's Party	1st	2024	
10th Chingeltei Sükhbaatar	Damdiny Tsogtbaatar	1970	Mongolian People's Party	3nd	2016	
10th Chingeltei Sükhbaatar	Khökhkhüügiin Bolormaa	1969	Democratic Party	1st	2024	
11th Songino Khairkhan	Enkhbayaryn Batshugar	1987	Mongolian People's Party	2nd	2021	
11th Songino Khairkhan	Norovyn Altankhuyag	1958	Democratic Party	5th	1996	
11th Songino Khairkhan	Narantsetsegiin Altanshagai	1984	Mongolian People's Party	1st	2024	
11th Songino Khairkhan	Pürevjavyn Sainzorig		Mongolian People's Party	1st	2024	
11th Songino Khairkhan	Chinbatyn Nomin	1983	Mongolian People's Party	1st	2024	
12th Khan Uul	Togtmolyn Mönkhsaikhan	1983	Mongolian People's Party	1st	2024	
12th Khan Uul	Chuluunbilegiin Lodoisambuu	1987	Democratic Party	1st	2024	
12th Khan Uul	Jukovyn Aldarjavkhlan	1977	Mongolian People's Party	1st	2024	
13th Bagakhangai Baganuur Nalaikh	Sainbuyangiin Amarsaikhan	1973	Mongolian People's Party	2nd	2020	
13th Bagakhangai Baganuur Nalaikh	Tsendiin Sandag-Ochir	1977	Mongolian People's Party	2nd	2020	

=== Proportional representation ===
48 members were elected from closed party list.

==== Mongolian People's Party ====
List number	Member	Year of birth	Party	Term	First elected	Notes
1	Ganzorigiin Luvsanjamts		Mongolian People's Party	1st	2024	
2	Mönkhchuluuny Enkhtsetseg		Mongolian People's Party	1st	2024	
3	Chinbaataryn Anar		Mongolian People's Party	1st	2024	
4	Otgony Saranchuluun		Mongolian People's Party	1st	2024	
5	Dügeriin Regdel	1951	Mongolian People's Party	1st	2024	
6	Davaasambuugiin Ganmaa		Mongolian People's Party	1st	2024	
7	Sükhbaataryn Erdenebat		Mongolian People's Party	1st	2024	
8	Mendbayaryn Mandkhai		Mongolian People's Party	1st	2024	
9	Dashtserengiin Enkhtüvshin		Mongolian People's Party	1st	2024	
10	Boldyn Uyanga	1986	Mongolian People's Party	1st	2024	
11	Janchivyn Galbadrakh		Mongolian People's Party	1st	2024	
12	Ayuushiin Ariunzaya	1980	Mongolian People's Party	1st	2024	
13	Bayarmagnain Bayarbaatar	1981	Mongolian People's Party	1st	2024	
14	Badarchiin Kherlen	1967	Mongolian People's Party	1st	2024	
15	Dulamyn Bum-Ochir	1977	Mongolian People's Party	1st	2024	
16	Odsürengiin Nominchimeg		Mongolian People's Party	1st	2024	
17	Sarkhadyn Zulpkhar	1975	Mongolian People's Party	1st	2024	
18	Khürelbaataryn Baasanjargal		Mongolian People's Party	1st	2024	

==== Democratic Party ====
List number	Member	Year of birth	Party	Term	First elected	Notes
1	Luvsannyamyn Gantömör	1973	Democratic Party	4th	2004	
2	Saldangiin Odontuyaa	1964	Democratic Party	3rd	2012	
3	Jambyn Batsuuri	1971	Democratic Party	2nd	2020	
4	Saruulsaikhany Tsengüün	1997	Democratic Party	1st	2024	
5	Ölziikhüügiin Shijir		Democratic Party	1st	2024	
6	Judagiin Bayarmaa		Democratic Party	1st	2024	
7	Jadambaagiin Bayasgalan		Democratic Party	1st	2024	
8	Dorjzovdyn Enkhtuya	1973	Democratic Party	1st	2024	
9	Khishigdembereliin Temüüjin	1971	Democratic Party	2nd	2012	
10	Badamdorjiin Punsalmaa		Democratic Party	1st	2024	
11	Erdenebilegiin Odbayar		Democratic Party	1st	2024	
12	Püreviin Batchimeg	1964	Democratic Party	1st	2024	
13	Ganbatyn Ochirbat		Democratic Party	1st	2024	
14	Batbayaryn Jargalan	1982	Democratic Party	1st	2024	
15	Amgalanbaataryn Ganbaatar		Democratic Party	1st	2024	
16	Tsendsürengiin Mönkhtuya		Democratic Party	1st	2024	

==== HUN Party ====
List number	Member	Year of birth	Party	Term	First elected	Notes
1	Togmidyn Dorjkhand	1977	HUN Party	2nd	2020	
2	Lutaagiin Enkhnasan		HUN Party	1st	2024	
3	Pürevjavyn Ganzorig		HUN Party	1st	2024	
4	Gonchigdorjiin Uyangakhishig	1978	HUN Party	1st	2024	
5	Badrakhyn Naidalaa	1975	HUN Party	1st	2024	
6	Baatarjavyn Mönkhsoyol		HUN Party	1st	2024	

==== National Coalition ====
List number	Member	Year of birth	Party	Term	First elected	Notes
1	Nyamtaishiryn Nomtoibayar		National Coalition	3rd	2012	
2	Agvaanluvsangiin Undraa	1973	National Coalition	2nd	2016	
3	Davaakhüügiin Pürevdavaa		National Coalition	1st	2024	
4	Myagmardashiin Sarnai		National Coalition	1st	2024	

==== Civil Will–Green Party ====
List number	Member	Year of birth	Party	Term	First elected	Notes
1	Batyn Batbaatar	1973	Civil Will–Green Party	2nd	2004	
2	Mönkhtöriin Narantuya-Nara		Civil Will–Green Party	1st	2024	
3	Rinchindorjiin Batbold		Civil Will–Green Party	1st	2024	
4	Songobaigiin Zamira		Civil Will–Green Party	1st	2024	

== Government ==
Portrait	Name Con. / PR (Birth–Death)	Tenure			Party	Government
Portrait	Name Con. / PR (Birth–Death)	Took office	Left office	Duration	Party	Government
	Luvsannamsrain Oyun-Erdene; 6th - Dornod, Khentii, Sükhbaatar (born 1980)	27 January 2021	13 June 2025	4 years, 138 days	Mongolian People's Party	Oyun-Erdene II (MPP–DP–HUN)
	Gombojavyn Zandanshatar; Not elected into the State Great Khural (born 1970)	13 June 2025	30 March 2026	291 days	Mongolian People's Party	Zandanshatar cabinet (MPP–HUN–IZNN)
	Nyam-Osoryn Uchral; 10th - Chingeltei, Sükhbaatar (born 1987)	30 March 2026	Incumbent	11 days	Mongolian People's Party	Uchral cabinet (MPP–HUN–NC)
