= Mongolian Green Party =

Political party in Mongolia

Mongolian Green Party Монголын Ногоон Нам
- Abbreviation: MGP (English); МНН (Mongolian)
- Chairman: Agvaanluvsangiin Undraa
- Founder: Davaagiin Basandorj
- Founded: 9 March 1990
- Registered: 26 May 1990
- Merger of: Green Way; Mongolian Greens' Movement
- Ideology: Green politics Direct democracy
- Political position: Centre-left
- National affiliation: National Coalition (since 2024)
- Regional affiliation: Asia Pacific Greens Federation
- International affiliation: Global Greens
- Colors: Green
- State Great Khural: 1 / 126

Party flag
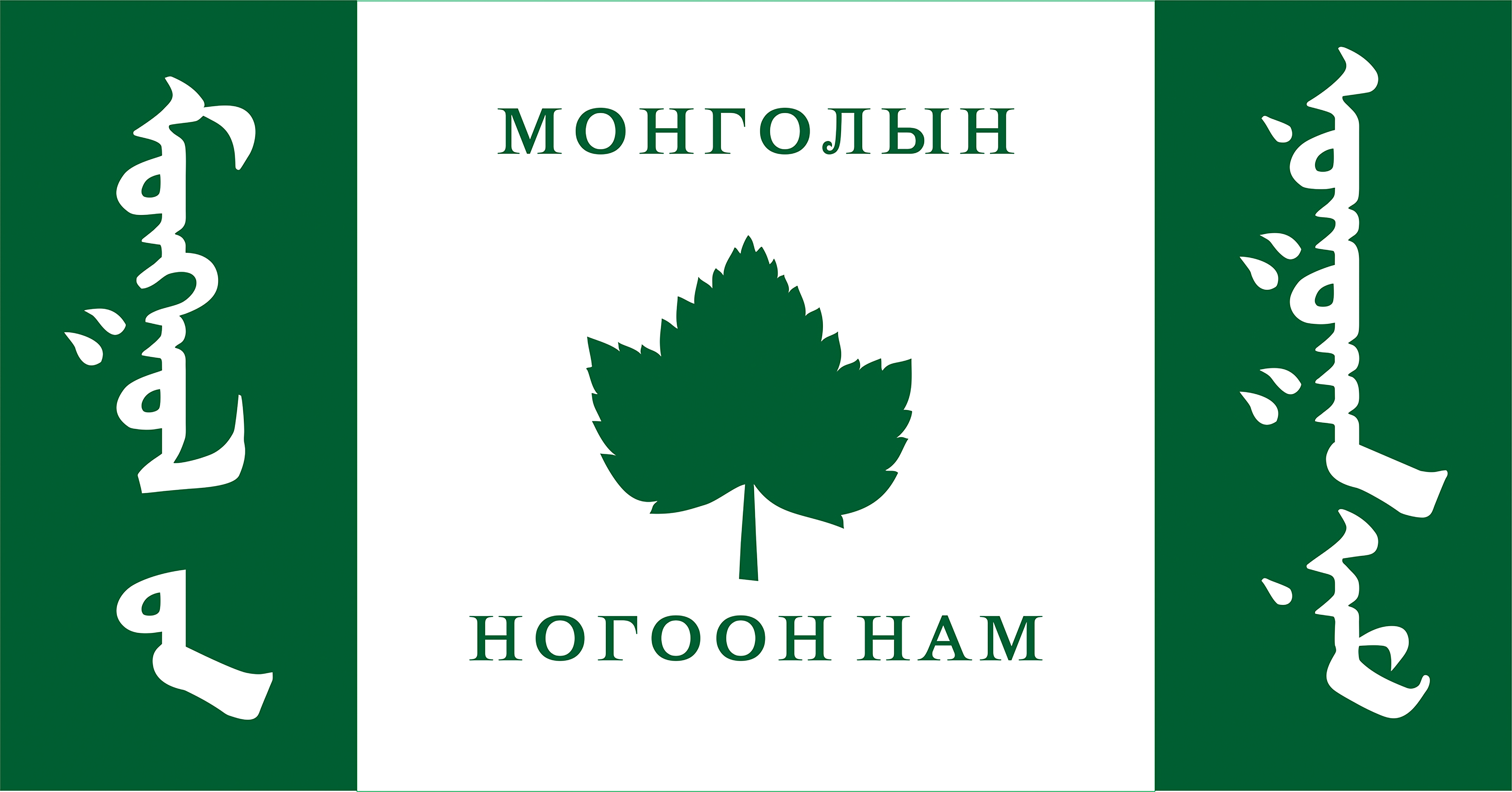

Website
- mongoliangreenparty.mn

The Mongolian Green Party (MGP) (Mongolian: Монголын Ногоон Нам, Mongol'in Nogoon Nam, abbr. МНН) is a green party in Mongolia. It was founded in March 1990 and registered as a political party on 26 May 1990, becoming the first green party of Mongolia and Asia.

== Ideology ==
The party had around 601 members as of 2017 and states its goal is working towards improving human rights and democracy in Mongolia and protecting the environment.

== History ==
=== Founding and early history (1988–90) ===
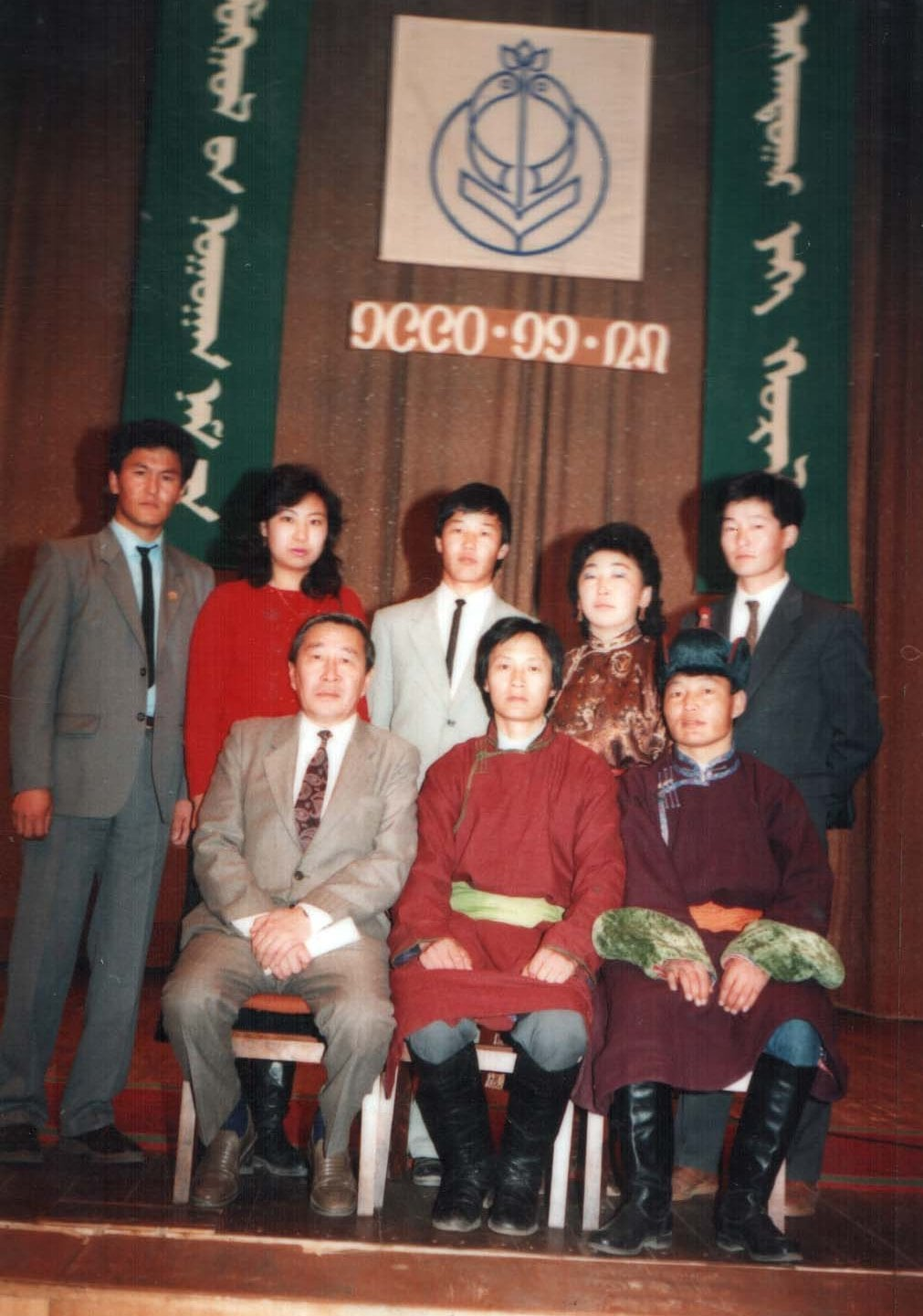
First Congress of the Mongolian Green Party, 1990

Prior to the 1990 democratic revolution, members of the Mongolian Nature Conservation Federation formed the "Green Way" club in 1988 and the "Mongolian Greens' Movement" in 1989. Both organizations fought for democratic reform and contributed to the foundation of the Mongolian Democratic Union.

On 9 March 1990, the two organizations founded the Mongolian Green Party, the year Mongolia became a multi-party democracy. It was registered by the Supreme Court, becoming the first green party to be founded in Asia. Its first chairman was Davaagiin Basandorj and the party had 3,000 members and 12,000 supporters in 1990. Mongolia's first free and fair elections were held in 1990. The MGP received 1.23% of the total party vote, but won no seats in the People's Great Khural or the State Little Khural.

=== 1990–2008 ===
After the ratification of the 1992 constitution, elections were held for the new unicameral legislature, the State Great Khural, in June 1992. The MGP ran independently in the election but won no parliamentary seats.

In the 1996 parliamentary election, the party was part of the opposition Democratic Union Coalition, which comprised the Mongolian Social Democratic Party, the Mongolian National Democratic Party, and the Mongolian Democratic Renaissance Party. The coalition won 50 out of 76 seats and formed a coalition government lasting from 1996 until the 2000 parliamentary elections. No MGP-affiliates won a seat in the election. Due to political instability and cabinet crises, by June 2000, there were a total of four prime ministers since 1996.

Amidst the political chaos, leading figure of the 1990 revolution and MP Sanjaasürengiin Zorig was assassinated at his home in October 1998. This led to a group of politicians in the coalition including Zorig's sister Sanjaasürengiin Oyun to split off and found the Civil Will Party (CWP).

The MGP ran together with the CWP for the 2000 parliamentary election, and together won 1 out of 76 seats in the State Great Khural. The Civil Will Party would later merge with Republican Party for the 2004 elections, founding the short-lived Civil Will–Republican Party. The MGP ran on its own and won no seats in the 2004 parliamentary election.

Logo of the Mongolian Green Party in 2008

The Civic Coalition was founded between the party and various non-governmental organizations for 2008 election. The refounded Mongolian Social Democratic Party and the newly established Civil Movement Party ran together with the MGP, whilst the CWP refused. The MGP won a single seat in the State Great Khural, where party chairman Dangaasürengiin Enkhbat was elected as their very first member of parliament.

=== Merger with the Civil Will Party (2011–12) ===
In 2011, the CWP suggested the two parties to merge for the upcoming 2012 elections. Despite many members of the MGP not supporting the proposal, then-party leader Enkhbat favoring a more environmentally liberal and business-friendly green politics, decided to merge with the CWP during its 9th Party Congress. MGP members who opposed the decision stalled the registration of the two party merger for over six months but ultimately the Civil Will–Green Party was founded in January 2012 and later registered by the Supreme Court in March 2012.

=== Post-merger (since 2012) ===
After Enkhbat joined the merger party, Olzodyn Boum-Yalagch succeeded him in 2012 and was officially registered as chairman by the Supreme Court in November. The party fielded 40 candidates in 26 constituencies and 16 candidates in the party list for the 2012 parliamentary election. The MGP won 1.19% of the party vote and no seats in the State Great Khural.

In the next 2016 parliamentary election, the MGP formed an electoral coalition with the Sovereignty and Unity Party, which had two seats in the outgoing legislature. The coalition came in fourth but couldn't manage to win any seats.

The MGP remained an extra-parliamentary party until 2024. Series of negotiations were made between the MGP and ex-MPP member of parliament Nyamtaishiryn Nomtoibayar in June 2023. Then-MP and chairman of the National Labour Party Togmidyn Dorjkhand criticized the MGP of being bought by Nomtoibayar for his re-election bid. In January 2024, the MGP and the Mongolian National Democratic Party founded the National Coalition for the upcoming 2024 elections. The coalition chose Nomtoibayar as its leader, and ultimately won 4 out of 126 seats in the expanded State Great Khural. However, no MGP members were elected into the parliament. Party chairman Olzodyn Boum-Yalagch, who placed fifth in the closed list, came close to being elected but was cut short due to insufficient number of party-list votes for proportional representation.

On 2 April 2026, MGP chairman Boum-Yalagch, who served as leader for 14 years, was succeeded by National Coalition MP Agvaanluvsangiin Undraa during an extraordinary party congress. Chairman Undraa became the party's first representative in the 9th State Great Khural. Later on 4 April 2026, the National Coalition joined a new coalition government led by Prime Minister Nyam-Osoryn Uchral (MPP), with coalition chairman Nomtoibayar being appointed as Deputy Prime Minister.

== Leaders ==
- Davaagiin Basandorj (1990–2007)
- Dangaasürengiin Enkhbat (2007–2012)
- Olzodyn Boum-Yalagch (2012–2026)
- Agvaanluvsangiin Undraa (2026–present)

== Electoral history ==
=== People's Great Khural elections ===
Election	Party leader	Votes	%	Seats	+/–	Position	Government
1990	Davaagiin Basandorj	12,044	1.23%	People's Great Khural 0 / 430 State Little Khural 0 / 50	New	5th	Extra-parliamentary

=== State Great Khural elections ===
Election	Party leader	Votes	%	Seats	+/–	Position	Government
1992	Davaagiin Basandorj	17,790	0.59%	0 / 76	0	▼10th	Opposition
1996 (Note: Run as part of the Democratic Union)	Davaagiin Basandorj	475,267	47.05%	0 / 76	Steady	▲1st	Coalition partner
2000 (Note: Run together with the Civil Will Party)	Davaagiin Basandorj	36,196	3.61%	1 / 76	▲1	▼6th	Opposition
2004	Davaagiin Basandorj	2,153	0.21%	0 / 76	▼1	6th	Extra-parliamentary
2008 (Note: Run as part of the Civic Coalition.)	Dangaasürengiin Enkhbat	24,806	1.43%	1 / 76	Steady	▲4th	Opposition
2012	Olzodyn Boum-Yalagch	15,076	1.27%	0 / 76	▼1	▼6th	Extra-parliamentary
2016 (Note: Run as part of the Sovereignty and Unity Coalition.)	Olzodyn Boum-Yalagch	35,394	2.51%	0 / 76	Steady	▲4th	Extra-parliamentary
2020	Olzodyn Boum-Yalagch	23,473	0.59%	0 / 76	Steady	▼7th	Extra-parliamentary
2024 (Note: Run as part of the National Coalition.)	Olzodyn Boum-Yalagch	75,196	5.17%	0 / 126	Steady	▲4th	Opposition (2024–2026)
2024	Olzodyn Boum-Yalagch	75,196	5.17%	0 / 126	Steady	▲4th	Coalition partner (since 2026)
