= Cabinet of Nyam-Osoryn Uchral =

22nd Government of Mongolia

- 22nd Cabinet of Mongolia
- 4 April 2026 – present
- Uchral and his cabinet's top ministers in September 2026
- Date formed: 4 April 2026

People and organisations
- President: Ukhnaagiin Khürelsükh; Sandagiin Byambatsogt (acting)
- Prime minister: Nyam-Osoryn Uchral
- Deputy: Jadambyn Enkhbayar; Togmidyn Dorjkhand; Nyamtaishiryn Nomtoibayar
- No. of ministers: 19 (Note: Does not include the Prime Minister)
- Ministers removed: 1 dismissed
- Member parties: Mongolian People's Party; HUN Party; National Coalition
- Status in legislature: Coalition government 79 / 126 (62.7%) (Note: At commencement.)
- Opposition parties: Democratic Party; Civil Will–Green Party

History
- Election: 2024 parliamentary election
- Legislature terms: 9th State Great Khural
- Predecessor: Zandanshatar

The Cabinet of Nyam-Osoryn Uchral (Mongolian: Ням-Осорын Учралын Засгийн газар) is the 22nd and current Government of Mongolia during the 9th legislative session of the State Great Khural. The cabinet was formed on 4 April 2026 by Nyam-Osoryn Uchral, who was appointed Prime Minister of Mongolia on 30 March 2026. It succeeded the previous cabinet led by Gombojavyn Zandanshatar.

== Government formation ==
The State Great Khural elected (88-19) former Chairman of the State Great Khural and Chairman of the Mongolian People's Party, Nyam-Osoryn Uchral, in the late hours of 30 March 2026.

Ballot	Candidate	Votes		Proportion
1st Ballot	Nyam-Osoryn Uchral (MPP)	Yes	88	69.84%
1st Ballot	Nyam-Osoryn Uchral (MPP)	No	19	15.08%
1st Ballot	Nyam-Osoryn Uchral (MPP)	Absent	19	15.08%
Nyam-Osoryn Uchral elected as Prime Minister of Mongolia.

The second-largest parliamentary bloc and former coalition partner to the MPP, the Democratic Party (DP), announced it had no intentions of joining the new cabinet led by Uchral. Without the DP's 42 seats, the MPP invited its previous partner, the HUN Party, to form a coalition government on 31 March 2026. A four-party cabinet between the MPP, its previous coalition partners (HUN Party and Civil Will–Green Party), and the National Coalition was initially speculated by the local media.

Uchral unveiled his cabinet nominations to the parliament for discussion on 3-4 April after the appointment of Sandagiin Byambatsogt (MPP) as speaker of parliament. Instead of the Civil Will–Green Party, the National Coalition was invited to the coalition government, with its leader, Nyamtaishiryn Nomtoibayar, nominated as Deputy Prime Minister of Mongolia. The unveiled cabinet retained its previous structure of 19 ministers and had eight nominations for renewal. The 19 ministers of the new cabinet was officially sworn in by the State Great Khural at 2:00 AM on 4 April 2026.

== Composition ==
Party	Ministers	Percentage
Mongolian People's Party	16	84%
HUN Party	2	11%
National Coalition	1	5%
Total	19	100%

№	Office(s)	Portrait	Minister Constituency	Party	Took office	Left office
1	Prime Minister		Nyam-Osoryn Uchral; MP for 10th Chingeltei, Sükhbaatar	MPP	30 March 2026	Incumbent
2	First Deputy Prime Minister of Mongolia and Minister of Economy and Development		Jadambyn Enkhbayar; MP for 5th Darkhan-Uul, Selenge, Töv Province	MPP	25 November 2025 (renewed on 4 April 2026)	Incumbent
3	Deputy Prime Minister		Togmidyn Dorjkhand; Party list	HUN	10 July 2024 (renewed on 4 April 2026)	Incumbent
4	Deputy Prime Minister		Nyamtaishiryn Nomtoibayar; Party list	National Coalition	4 April 2026	Incumbent
5	Chief Cabinet Secretary		Battömöriin Enkhbayar; MP for 8th Bayanzürkh District	MPP	4 April 2026	Incumbent
6	Minister of Foreign Affairs		Batmönkhiin Battsetseg; MP for 1st Arkhangai, Bayankhongor, Övörkhangai Province	MPP	29 January 2021 (renewed on 4 April 2026)	Incumbent
7	Minister of Finance		Zagdjavyn Mendsaikhan; MP for 2nd Govi-Altai, Khovd, Uvs, Zavkhan Province	MPP	4 April 2026	Incumbent
8	Minister of Justice and Internal Affairs		Sainbuyangiin Amarsaikhan; MP for 13th Bagakhangai, Baganuur, Nalaikh District	MPP	4 April 2026	16 September 2026 (dismissed)
8	Minister of Justice and Internal Affairs		Ganzorigiin Temüülen; MP for 1st Arkhangai, Bayankhongor, Övörkhangai Province	MPP	22 September 2026	Incumbent
9	Minister of Mining and Heavy Industry		Gongoryn Damdinnyam; MP for 5th Darkhan-Uul, Selenge, Töv Province	MPP	18 June 2025 (renewed on 4 April 2026)	Incumbent
10	Ministry of Defense		Dambyn Batlut; MP for 4th Bulgan, Khövsgöl, Orkhon Province	MPP	18 June 2025 (renewed on 4 April 2026)	Incumbent
11	Minister of Environment and Climate Change		Tsendiin Sandag-Ochir; MP for 13th Bagakhangai, Baganuur, Nalaikh District	MPP	4 April 2026	Incumbent
12	Minister of Education		Luvsantserengiin Enkh-Amgalan; MP for 4th Bulgan, Khövsgöl, Orkhon Province	MPP	4 April 2026	Incumbent
13	Minister of Family, Labor and Social Protection		Telukhany Aubakir; MP for 3rd Bayan-Ölgii Province	MPP	18 June 2025 (renewed on 4 April 2026)	Incumbent
14	Minister of Road and Transport Development		Borkhüügiin Delgersaikhan; MP for 7th Govisümber, Dornogovi, Dundgovi, Ömnögovi Province	MPP	10 July 2024 (renewed on 4 April 2026)	Incumbent
15	Minister of Culture, Sports, Tourism, and Youth		Jukovyn Aldarjavkhlan; MP for 12th Khan-Uul District	MPP	4 April 2026	Incumbent
16	Minister of Construction, Urban Development, and Housing		Enkhtaivany Bat-Amgalan; MP for 8th Bayanzürkh District	MPP	18 June 2025 (renewed on 4 April 2026)	Incumbent
17	Minister of Food, Agriculture and Light Industry		Tsagaankhüügiin Iderbat; MP for 6th Dornod, Khentii, Sükhbaatar Province	MPP	4 April 2026	Incumbent
18	Minister of Digital Development, Innovation, and Communications		Chinbatyn Nomin; MP for 11th Songinokhairkhan District	MPP	4 April 2026	Incumbent
19	Minister of Energy		Badrakhyn Naidalaa; Party list	HUN	4 April 2026	Incumbent
20	Minister of Health		Enkhbayaryn Batshugar; MP for 11th Songinokhairkhan District	MPP	4 April 2026	Incumbent

== See also ==
- Government of Mongolia
- Prime Minister of Mongolia
