= Enkhbayar =

Enkhbayar (Mongolian: Энхбаяр) is a Mongolian personal name. “Энх” Enkh- means Peace, “Баяр” Bayar- means Happiness, making together “Peaceful happiness”. Notable people bearing this name include:

as proper name

- Batshugar Enkhbayar (born 1987), Mongolian politician
- Nambaryn Enkhbayar (born 1958), Mongolian Prime Minister in 2000–2004, and President of Mongolia in 2005–2009
- Jargalsaikhany Enkhbayar (born 1977), a Mongolian international footballer

as patronymic
