= 1992 Mongolian parliamentary election =

- 28 June 1992
- All 76 seats in the State Great Khural; 39 seats needed for a majority
- Turnout: 95.60% (▼2.29pp)
Party	Leader	Vote %	Seats	+/–
MPRP	Büdragchaagiin Dash-Yondon	57.06	70	−287
Alliance	Mendsaikhany Enkhsaikhan	17.48	4	−12
MSDP	Bat-Erdeniin Batbayar	10.08	1	−3
Independents	–	2.83	1	−37
This lists parties that won seats. See the complete results below.
Prime Minister before	Prime Minister after
Dashiin Byambasüren; MPRP	Puntsagiin Jasrai; MPRP

Parliamentary elections were held in Mongolia on 28 June 1992, the first to be held after the adoption of the 1992 constitution. The result was a victory for the Mongolian People's Revolutionary Party (MPRP), which won 70 of the 76 seats in the State Great Khural. The Democratic Alliance, a coalition between three opposition parties, placed second with 4 seats, followed by the Mongolian Social Democratic Party and an independent with a single seat. Voter turnout was at 95.60%.

During the campaign, the MPRP, the former sole legal party, distanced itself from Marxism–Leninism, framing itself instead as a centrist party. However, the leadership of the party was the same as during the communist period. The success of the MPRP in the elections was considered to be due to its larger nationwide party structure and implementation of a majoritarian system that favoured the dominant party.

== Background ==
=== Fall of communism ===
The MPRP was the sole legal ruling party of the Mongolian People's Republic since the Mongolian Revolution of 1921.

Following mass pro-democracy demonstrations organized by the Mongolian Democratic Union (MDU) in late 1989 and early 1990, the General Secretary of the MPRP, Jambyn Batmönkh, and other politburo leaders announced their resignation in March 1990, paving the way for democratic change in Mongolia.

On 21 March 1990, during the 8th Extraordinary People's Grand Khural session, the following constitutional provision: "The guiding force of the Mongolian People's Republic is the Mongolian People's Revolutionary Party, which uses the all-conquering Marxist-Leninist theory in its operations." was removed from the Constitution of the MPR; officially ending 70 years of one-party rule.

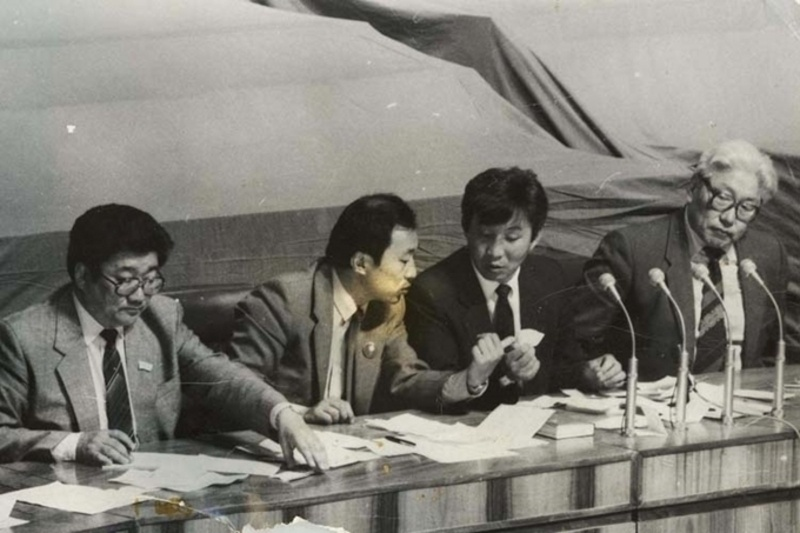
Chairman of the Presidium P.Ochirbat (leftmost) and deputy premier D.Byambasüren (rightmost) with opposition leaders Da.Ganbold (center-left) and E.Bat-Üül (center-right) during a meeting, June 1990

=== Transition to democracy ===
The first multi-party elections were held in July 1990 for the People's Grand Khural and the newly established standing legislature, the State Little Khural, with a high turnout of 98%. The MPRP won a majority in both houses, while four opposition parties made modest gains. The largest opposition was the Mongolian Democratic Party (MDP), which had 16 and 13 seats in the upper and lower houses. The MDP was followed by the Mongolian National Progress Party (MNPP) with 6 and 3 seats, the Mongolian Social Democratic Party (MSDP) with 4 seats in both legislatures in the People's Grand Khural.

Economist Dashiin Byambasüren (MPRP) was appointed the next prime minister on 11 September, along with the president and the vice president. Despite the MPRP's majority, Byambasüren established a grand coalition government with the opposition MDP and the MNPP in September 1990. The chairman of the MNPP, Davaadorjiin Ganbold, became the First Deputy Prime Minister, while deputy chairman of the MDP, Dambiin Dorligjav, became Deputy Prime Minister.

In April 1991, political developments within the MDU, Mongolia's largest non-governmental pro-democracy organization, led Sanjaasürengiin Zorig, a key leader of the 1990 revolution, to resign from his positions in the MDU. He also left the MDP to establish the Republican Party (Mongolian: Бүгд Найрамдах Нам) in June 1991. Later in February 1992, his party merged with the Free Labour Party and factions of the MDU to found the Mongolian United Party (MUP).

In January 1992, a new constitution was ratified, which renamed the country Mongolia and established a unicameral legislature, the State Great Khural, which was to be elected in the next election.

== Electoral system ==
According to the new Law on Elections, the 76 members of the State Great Khural were to be elected from multi-member constituencies organized 70 days before polling day. For the June 28 election, the country was divided into 26 electoral districts, which had a varying number of elected winners (2 to 4). With the addition of Article 35, Section 2 of the election law (which requires each voter to cast votes equal to the number of eligible seats in their district), the elections were to be conducted under a multi-member majoritarian system.

The new electoral law also stated that the election results of electoral districts that didn't meet the 50% turnout benchmark were to be invalidated, and any vacancy seats created in parliament would be filled by the next highest vote winner in the June election. Due to the lack of opposition organization and party structure, a delegation from the International Foundation for Electoral Systems (IFES) found that the MPRP was overwhelmingly favoured by the majoritarian system.

== Contesting parties ==
The new electoral law and implementation of a majoritarian system raised concerns within the Mongolian opposition. In reaction to the majoritarian systems, the main opposition parties (the MDP, the MNPP, and the MUP) announced an electoral coalition on 23 April 1992, when the three party chairmen signed an agreement.

For the 1992 parliamentary election, 293 candidates were registered by the newly established General Election Commission, of whom 18 were independents, and 275 were running from the following 8 political parties and 2 coalitions.

Party	Total
Mongolian People's Revolutionary Party	76
Democratic Alliance (Mongolian Democratic Party–Mongolian National Progress Party–Mongolian United Party)	48
Mongolian Social Democratic Party	28
Mongolian United Party of Herdsman and Farmers	19
Mongolian United Party of Private Owners	20
Mongolian Party for Independence	24
Mongolian Bourgeois Party	17
Mongolian Renaissance Party	28
Mongolian Religious Democratic Party–Mongolian People's Party	9
Mongolian Green Party	6
Total	275

== Campaign ==
Polling was conducted during an ongoing economic crisis, marked by high inflation, unemployment, raw material scarcity, and food shortages. During the campaign, the three-party opposition coalition complained of its restricted access to the mass media compared to the MPRP and underlined the recently disastrous management that had led to economic disruptions.

== Results ==
The Mongolian People's Revolutionary Party achieved a supermajority of 70 seats (92% of the total seats), despite receiving around 50% of the total constituency vote. The primary opposition coalition, between the Mongolian Democratic Party, the Mongolian National Progress Party, and the Mongolian United Party, won 4 seats in the State Great Khural. The Mongolian Social Democratic Party and an independent politician in Govi-Altai Province each won a single seat.

Party	Votes	%	Seats	+/–
Mongolian People's Revolutionary Party	1,724,627	57.06	70	–273
MDP–MNPP–MUP Alliance	528,456	17.48	4	–19
Mongolian Social Democratic Party	304,578	10.08	1	–3
Mongolian Renaissance Party	114,343	3.78	0	New
Mongolian Party for Independence	63,744	2.11	0	New
Mongolian Bourgeois Party	60,207	1.99	0	New
Mongolian United Party of Herdsman and Farmers	56,085	1.86	0	New
Mongolian United Party of Private Owners	42,863	1.42	0	New
Mongolian Religious Democratic Party–Mongolian People's Party	23,974	0.79	0	New
Mongolian Green Party	17,790	0.59	0	New
Independents	85,674	2.83	1	–50
Total	3,022,341	100.00	76	–354
Valid votes	974,219	93.91		
Invalid/blank votes	63,168	6.09		
Total votes	1,037,387	100.00		
Registered voters/turnout	1,085,099	95.60		
Source: General Election Commission

=== Results by constituency ===
Results by constituency

Constituency 1. Arkhangai
Candidate	Party	Votes	%
R. Gonchigdorj	Mongolian Social Democratic Party	30,527	71.24
Ch. Pürevdorj	Mongolian People's Revolutionary Party	23,573	55.01
M. Dalaikhüü	Mongolian People's Revolutionary Party	19,823	46.26
Kh. Pürevdagva	Mongolian People's Revolutionary Party	14,604	34.08
L. Dashnyam	MDP–MNPP–MUP Alliance	11,908	27.79
Ts. Adiyaasüren	Mongolian Social Democratic Party	7,874	18.38
S. Tömörkhüü	MDP–MNPP–MUP Alliance	7,687	17.94
P. Jaltsan	Mongolian People's Revolutionary Party	4,579	10.69
B. Tsiiregzen	Mongolian Party for Independence	3,368	7.86
D. Luvsandorj	Mongolian United Party of Private Owners	2,678	6.25
D. Khürelbat	Mongolian United Party of Herdsman and Farmers	1,929	4.50
Total		128,550	100.00
Valid votes		42,850	94.75
Invalid/blank votes		2,376	5.25
Total votes		45,226	100.00
Registered voters/turnout		46,510	97.24

Constituency 2. Bayan-Ölgii
Candidate	Party	Votes	%
A. Bolat	Mongolian People's Revolutionary Party	26,349	67.17
T. Sultan	Mongolian People's Revolutionary Party	23,775	60.61
Kh. Volodya	Mongolian People's Revolutionary Party	21,481	54.76
K. Sairan	Mongolian Social Democratic Party	16,057	40.93
B. Zarykkhan	Mongolian Renaissance Party	6,923	17.65
I. Khuatai	MDP–MNPP–MUP Alliance	6,904	17.60
A. Magash	Mongolian Renaissance Party	6,871	17.52
S. Batchuluun	Mongolian Renaissance Party	4,643	11.84
D. Khorolsüren	Mongolian United Party of Private Owners	2,130	5.43
D. Bazarsad	Mongolian Bourgeois Party	1,520	3.87
Total		116,653	100.00
Valid votes		39,226	93.10
Invalid/blank votes		2,906	6.90
Total votes		42,132	100.00
Registered voters/turnout		45,350	92.90

Constituency 3. Bayankhongor
Candidate	Party	Votes	%
G. Tsedendagva	Mongolian People's Revolutionary Party	21,590	58.92
B. Gombo	Mongolian People's Revolutionary Party	20,621	56.28
D. Dashtseden	Mongolian People's Revolutionary Party	20,260	55.29
Z. Narmandakh	MDP–MNPP–MUP Alliance	9,875	26.95
B. Bas-Orgil	MDP–MNPP–MUP Alliance	8,739	23.85
J. Ganbold	MDP–MNPP–MUP Alliance	8,705	23.76
D. Tümen	Mongolian Social Democratic Party	5,907	16.12
J. Byamba	Mongolian Bourgeois Party	3,091	8.44
S. Luvsanvandan	Mongolian Renaissance Party	2,315	6.32
D. Jamiyan	Mongolian Religious Democratic Party–Mongolian People's Party	2,104	5.74
B. Lkhagvaa	Mongolian United Party of Herdsman and Farmers	1,986	5.42
D. Nyamaa	Mongolian United Party of Private Owners	1,626	4.44
N. Oidovdorj	Mongolian Renaissance Party	1,371	3.74
P. Byambasüren	Mongolian Party for Independence	1,083	2.96
P. Batsükh	Mongolian United Party of Private Owners	643	1.75
Total		109,916	100.00
Valid votes		36,642	95.99
Invalid/blank votes		1,530	4.01
Total votes		38,172	100.00
Registered voters/turnout		39,702	96.15

Constituency 4. Bulgan
Candidate	Party	Votes	%
J. Boldbaatar	Mongolian People's Revolutionary Party	18,541	67.91
S. Gündenbal	Mongolian People's Revolutionary Party	16,920	61.97
D. Lamjav	Mongolian Social Democratic Party	7,352	26.93
P. Davaanyam	MDP–MNPP–MUP Alliance	6,487	23.76
B. Jambal	Mongolian Green Party	1,608	5.89
D. Davaa	Mongolian United Party of Herdsman and Farmers	1,209	4.43
G. Ganbat	Mongolian Party for Independence	990	3.63
J. Dashlombo	Mongolian United Party of Herdsman and Farmers	879	3.22
D. Samdan	Mongolian Renaissance Party	618	2.26
Total		54,604	100.00
Valid votes		27,302	92.16
Invalid/blank votes		2,324	7.84
Total votes		29,626	100.00
Registered voters/turnout		30,211	98.06

Constituency 5. Govi-Altai
Candidate	Party	Votes	%
A. Bazarkhüü	Mongolian People's Revolutionary Party	18,698	62.27
G. Zuunai	Independent	12,246	40.78
V. Alzakhgüi	Mongolian People's Revolutionary Party	11,551	38.47
L. Byambajargal	Mongolian Social Democratic Party	9,940	33.10
J. Baasandash	MDP–MNPP–MUP Alliance	7,623	25.39
Total		60,058	100.00
Valid votes		30,029	94.84
Invalid/blank votes		1,635	5.16
Total votes		31,664	100.00
Registered voters/turnout		32,170	98.43

Constituency 6. Dornogovi
Candidate	Party	Votes	%
Yo. Adilbish	Mongolian People's Revolutionary Party	20,065	70.81
Ts. Sharavdorj	Mongolian People's Revolutionary Party	18,389	64.89
S. Ganbaatar	Mongolian Social Democratic Party	6,578	23.21
N. Davaanyam	MDP–MNPP–MUP Alliance	6,528	23.04
B. Dogmid	Mongolian Party for Independence	3,862	13.63
D. Tserendorj	Mongolian United Party of Private Owners	1,254	4.43
Total		56,676	100.00
Valid votes		28,338	93.67
Invalid/blank votes		1,916	6.33
Total votes		30,254	100.00
Registered voters/turnout		31,399	96.35

Constituency 7. Dornod
Candidate	Party	Votes	%
D. Bazarsad	Mongolian People's Revolutionary Party	20,211	58.85
Ts. Törmandakh	Mongolian People's Revolutionary Party	19,859	57.83
D. Dagvasüren	Mongolian People's Revolutionary Party	19,293	56.18
D. Enkhbaatar	MDP–MNPP–MUP Alliance	11,801	34.36
D. Tserenchimeg	MDP–MNPP–MUP Alliance	11,440	33.31
G. Khürelbaatar	Mongolian Social Democratic Party	6,980	20.32
D. Jumdaanbaatar	Mongolian United Party of Herdsman and Farmers	3,782	11.01
B. Buyandelger	Mongolian Renaissance Party	3,508	10.21
B. Lkhanaasüren	Independent	2,323	6.76
Ts. Davaakhüü	Mongolian Bourgeois Party	1,306	3.80
D. Mishigdorj	Mongolian United Party of Private Owners	1,287	3.75
G. Tegshjargal	Mongolian Party for Independence	1,236	3.60
Total		103,026	100.00
Valid votes		34,342	92.57
Invalid/blank votes		2,757	7.43
Total votes		37,099	100.00
Registered voters/turnout		38,038	97.53

Constituency 8. Dundgovi
Candidate	Party	Votes	%
S. Batmönkh	Mongolian People's Revolutionary Party	11,271	49.09
N. Togtokh	Mongolian People's Revolutionary Party	11,065	48.20
J. Otgonbayar	MDP–MNPP–MUP Alliance	6,065	26.42
Ts. Ganbold	Mongolian Social Democratic Party	6,037	26.30
R. Dashdoorov	Mongolian Renaissance Party	5,267	22.94
J. Narantsatsralt	MDP–MNPP–MUP Alliance	3,873	16.87
Z. Erdenebileg	Independent	981	4.27
Kh. Bürentogtokh	Mongolian Party for Independence	847	3.69
M. Mashbat	Mongolian United Party of Private Owners	510	2.22
Total		45,916	100.00
Valid votes		22,958	93.26
Invalid/blank votes		1,658	6.74
Total votes		24,616	100.00
Registered voters/turnout		25,220	97.61

Constituency 9. Zavkhan
Candidate	Party	Votes	%
N. Bagabandi	Mongolian People's Revolutionary Party	31,169	70.60
Ts. Namkhainyambuu	Mongolian People's Revolutionary Party	29,250	66.26
S. Nyamzagd	Mongolian People's Revolutionary Party	28,111	63.68
D. Radnaaragchaa	Independent	10,952	24.81
Ts. Gankhuyag	MDP–MNPP–MUP Alliance	10,737	24.32
N. Battsereg	MDP–MNPP–MUP Alliance	9,112	20.64
Yo. Terbish	Mongolian Social Democratic Party	7,695	17.43
G. Pürevsüren	Mongolian Religious Democratic Party–Mongolian People's Party	3,531	8.00
D. Battogtokh	Mongolian Religious Democratic Party–Mongolian People's Party	1,251	2.83
Ya. Sodnom	Mongolian Bourgeois Party	633	1.43
Total		132,441	100.00
Valid votes		44,147	95.21
Invalid/blank votes		2,219	4.79
Total votes		46,366	100.00
Registered voters/turnout		47,807	96.99

Constituency 10. Övörkhangai
Candidate	Party	Votes	%
D. Lündeejantsan	Mongolian People's Revolutionary Party	31,590	66.64
O. Batmönkh	Mongolian People's Revolutionary Party	26,086	55.03
J. Batsuuri	Mongolian People's Revolutionary Party	25,812	54.45
Sh. Batbayar	Mongolian People's Revolutionary Party	25,257	53.28
D. Shagdarsüren	Mongolian Social Democratic Party	16,615	35.05
B. Batjargal	MDP–MNPP–MUP Alliance	13,111	27.66
Ch. Döl	MDP–MNPP–MUP Alliance	13,031	27.49
D. Sükhbaatar	Independent	9,862	20.80
A. Zangad	Independent	5,143	10.85
D. Bayasgalan	Mongolian United Party of Herdsman and Farmers	5,088	10.73
N. Urtnasan	Mongolian Renaissance Party	4,478	9.45
D. Pürevdorj	Mongolian Renaissance Party	4,294	9.06
N. Erdenetsogt	Mongolian United Party of Private Owners	3,922	8.27
G. Batdelger	Mongolian Bourgeois Party	2,972	6.27
D. Mönkh-Ochir	Mongolian Party for Independence	2,331	4.92
Total		189,592	100.00
Valid votes		47,407	93.74
Invalid/blank votes		3,166	6.26
Total votes		50,573	100.00
Registered voters/turnout		52,215	96.86

Constituency 11. Ömnögovi
Candidate	Party	Votes	%
R. Tsagaankhüü	Mongolian People's Revolutionary Party	12,576	60.98
D. Idevkhten	Mongolian People's Revolutionary Party	12,241	59.36
Ts. Bayarsaikhan	MDP–MNPP–MUP Alliance	6,519	31.61
Ch. Otgonbayar	Mongolian Social Democratic Party	5,013	24.31
B. Tsedensamba	Mongolian Renaissance Party	3,165	15.35
B. Erdene	Mongolian United Party of Herdsman and Farmers	1,730	8.39
Total		41,244	100.00
Valid votes		20,622	95.04
Invalid/blank votes		1,076	4.96
Total votes		21,698	100.00
Registered voters/turnout		22,027	98.51

Constituency 12. Sükhbaatar
Candidate	Party	Votes	%
J. Gombojav	Mongolian People's Revolutionary Party	17,924	70.33
Ch. Khurts	Mongolian People's Revolutionary Party	13,647	53.55
Sh. Shagdarsüren	MDP–MNPP–MUP Alliance	6,509	25.54
D. Moondoi	Mongolian Social Democratic Party	4,702	18.45
Kh. Gündsambuu	Independent	2,345	9.20
J. Erdenebaatar	Mongolian Party for Independence	1,832	7.19
D. Ochirjav	Mongolian Religious Democratic Party–Mongolian People's Party	1,377	5.40
S. Amgaa	Mongolian United Party of Herdsman and Farmers	871	3.42
B. Magsarjav	Mongolian Renaissance Party	700	2.75
Yo. Ukhnai	Mongolian Bourgeois Party	555	2.18
G. Mönkhbat	Independent	510	2.00
Total		50,972	100.00
Valid votes		25,486	94.18
Invalid/blank votes		1,576	5.82
Total votes		27,062	100.00
Registered voters/turnout		27,280	99.20

Constituency 13. Selenge
Candidate	Party	Votes	%
D. Mönkhöö	Mongolian People's Revolutionary Party	27,666	68.18
B. Demberel	Mongolian People's Revolutionary Party	23,944	59.01
Ch. Zorigtbaatar	Mongolian People's Revolutionary Party	23,305	57.43
S. Bayartsogt	Mongolian Social Democratic Party	12,042	29.68
D. Tsogt-Ochir	MDP–MNPP–MUP Alliance	10,802	26.62
L. Altangerel	MDP–MNPP–MUP Alliance	9,253	22.80
B. Tsedendamba	Mongolian United Party of Herdsman and Farmers	3,610	8.90
Kh. Gantsooj	Mongolian Religious Democratic Party–Mongolian People's Party	3,371	8.31
L. Nyam	Mongolian Green Party	3,176	7.83
O. Tsolmon	Mongolian Party for Independence	1,651	4.07
D. Baatar	Mongolian Renaissance Party	1,497	3.69
N. Ankhbayar	Mongolian United Party of Private Owners	1,420	3.50
Total		121,737	100.00
Valid votes		40,579	94.41
Invalid/blank votes		2,403	5.59
Total votes		42,982	100.00
Registered voters/turnout		44,288	97.05

Constituency 14. Töv
Candidate	Party	Votes	%
Ch. Dashdemberel	Mongolian People's Revolutionary Party	37,080	75.78
B. Lkhagvasüren	Mongolian People's Revolutionary Party	34,559	70.63
M. Zenee	Mongolian People's Revolutionary Party	31,982	65.36
M. Mendbileg	Mongolian People's Revolutionary Party	29,548	60.39
D. Ganbold	MDP–MNPP–MUP Alliance	13,748	28.10
Kh. Dashzeveg	MDP–MNPP–MUP Alliance	9,818	20.06
S. Idshinnorov	Mongolian Social Democratic Party	8,123	16.60
D. Badarch	Mongolian Green Party	6,279	12.83
B. Atarbaatar	Mongolian Renaissance Party	5,289	10.81
G. Namjildorj	Mongolian Party for Independence	5,256	10.74
A. Bayarmagnai	Mongolian Party for Independence	3,935	8.04
S. Ganbat	Independent	3,744	7.65
Yo. Pürevbaatar	Mongolian Bourgeois Party	3,540	7.23
G. Mönkhbayar	Mongolian United Party of Private Owners	2,823	5.77
Total		195,724	100.00
Valid votes		48,931	94.26
Invalid/blank votes		2,980	5.74
Total votes		51,911	100.00
Registered voters/turnout		53,650	96.76

Constituency 15. Uvs
Candidate	Party	Votes	%
S. Tömör	Mongolian People's Revolutionary Party	32,745	82.18
N. Bayartsaikhan	Mongolian People's Revolutionary Party	32,366	81.23
O. Shaaluu	Mongolian People's Revolutionary Party	28,259	70.92
D. Dorligjav	MDP–MNPP–MUP Alliance	8,548	21.45
G. Lkhagvajav	Mongolian Social Democratic Party	7,950	19.95
G. Chuluunbat	MDP–MNPP–MUP Alliance	3,187	8.00
B. Dejid	Mongolian United Party of Herdsman and Farmers	2,586	6.49
S. Bayantsagaan	Mongolian Religious Democratic Party–Mongolian People's Party	1,420	3.56
S. Tüntee	Mongolian Renaissance Party	1,071	2.69
D. Tsetsegmaa	Mongolian Party for Independence	793	1.99
T. Tseveenravdan	Mongolian United Party of Private Owners	635	1.59
Total		119,560	100.00
Valid votes		39,846	91.93
Invalid/blank votes		3,498	8.07
Total votes		43,344	100.00
Registered voters/turnout		45,389	95.49

Constituency 16. Khovd
Candidate	Party	Votes	%
J. Norovsambuu	Mongolian People's Revolutionary Party	30,465	83.50
J. Byambadorj	Mongolian People's Revolutionary Party	27,941	76.58
D. Demberel	Mongolian People's Revolutionary Party	26,218	71.86
G. Nyamdavaa	MDP–MNPP–MUP Alliance	6,626	18.16
D. Bayandalai	Mongolian Renaissance Party	4,989	13.67
Ts. Narantuyaa	MDP–MNPP–MUP Alliance	4,248	11.64
S. Rendorj	Mongolian Social Democratic Party	3,321	9.10
B. Morkh	Mongolian Party for Independence	1,755	4.81
L. Galbadrakh	Mongolian Renaissance Party	1,681	4.61
R. Törtogtokh	Mongolian United Party of Herdsman and Farmers	1,473	4.04
J. Chuntai	Mongolian United Party of Private Owners	744	2.04
Total		109,461	100.00
Valid votes		36,487	95.52
Invalid/blank votes		1,710	4.48
Total votes		38,197	100.00
Registered voters/turnout		39,002	97.94

Constituency 17. Khövsgöl
Candidate	Party	Votes	%
B. Chimed	Mongolian People's Revolutionary Party	28,176	55.50
Ts. Elbegdorj	MDP–MNPP–MUP Alliance	28,022	55.20
D. Danzan	Mongolian People's Revolutionary Party	25,216	49.67
G. Törtogtokh	Mongolian People's Revolutionary Party	20,678	40.73
R. Odonbaatar	MDP–MNPP–MUP Alliance	20,667	40.71
Ö. Enkhtüvshin	Mongolian People's Revolutionary Party	20,188	39.76
J. Byambasüren	Mongolian Social Democratic Party	19,554	38.52
Ch. Düüjii	Mongolian Renaissance Party	16,411	32.32
B. Gansükh	Mongolian United Party of Herdsman and Farmers	10,813	21.30
B. Bat-Erdene	Mongolian United Party of Herdsman and Farmers	7,160	14.10
B. Enkhtuyaa	Mongolian Party for Independence	5,391	10.62
Total		202,276	100.00
Valid votes		50,769	91.70
Invalid/blank votes		4,594	8.30
Total votes		55,363	100.00
Registered voters/turnout		59,699	92.74

Constituency 18. Khentii
Candidate	Party	Votes	%
D. Byambasüren	Mongolian People's Revolutionary Party	26,918	79.05
N. Ganbyamba	Mongolian People's Revolutionary Party	16,539	48.57
D. Ganbold	MDP–MNPP–MUP Alliance	15,800	46.40
Ch. Gan-Ölzii	Mongolian People's Revolutionary Party	13,725	40.31
N. Tüvshintögs	Mongolian Social Democratic Party	11,250	33.04
N. Nyam-Osor	Mongolian United Party of Private Owners	4,600	13.51
J. Lkhamsüren	Mongolian Renaissance Party	2,791	8.20
N. Enkhtaivan	Mongolian Green Party	2,784	8.18
G. Bayarkhüü	Independent	2,782	8.17
A. Enkh-Amgalan	Mongolian United Party of Herdsman and Farmers	2,625	7.71
Ts. Gombojav	Mongolian Religious Democratic Party–Mongolian People's Party	2,339	6.87
Total		102,153	100.00
Valid votes		34,051	95.43
Invalid/blank votes		1,630	4.57
Total votes		35,681	100.00
Registered voters/turnout		36,422	97.97

Constituency 19. Darkhan-Uul
Candidate	Party	Votes	%
N. Jantsannorov	Mongolian People's Revolutionary Party	19,902	56.76
Ch. Bayanjargal	Mongolian People's Revolutionary Party	19,008	54.21
J. Jadambaa	Mongolian People's Revolutionary Party	18,659	53.22
T. Erdenebileg	MDP–MNPP–MUP Alliance	14,221	40.56
D. Battulga	MDP–MNPP–MUP Alliance	13,215	37.69
B. Enebish	Mongolian Social Democratic Party	11,543	32.92
Sh. Boldbaatar	Mongolian Bourgeois Party	3,391	9.67
Sh. Gandariyaa	Independent	3,299	9.41
T. Nyamdorj	Mongolian Renaissance Party	1,954	5.57
Total		105,192	100.00
Valid votes		35,062	93.01
Invalid/blank votes		2,636	6.99
Total votes		37,698	100.00
Registered voters/turnout		40,795	92.41

Constituency 20. Erdenet
Candidate	Party	Votes	%
J. Delgertsetseg	Mongolian People's Revolutionary Party	13,770	60.56
Sh. Chunag	Mongolian People's Revolutionary Party	10,903	47.95
L. Luvsan-Ochir	MDP–MNPP–MUP Alliance	8,679	38.17
T. Ganbold	Mongolian Social Democratic Party	8,188	36.01
N. Tsogtsaikhan	Mongolian Bourgeois Party	1,806	7.94
L. Garamjil	Mongolian Party for Independence	1,358	5.97
T. Naidanjav	Mongolian United Party of Private Owners	750	3.30
Total		45,454	100.00
Valid votes		22,737	92.46
Invalid/blank votes		1,854	7.54
Total votes		24,591	100.00
Registered voters/turnout		26,379	93.22

Constituency 21. Ulaanbaatar
Candidate	Party	Votes	%
Ts. Nyamdorj	Mongolian People's Revolutionary Party	15,304	50.33
S. Chuluunbaatar	Mongolian People's Revolutionary Party	14,742	48.48
E. Bat-Üül	MDP–MNPP–MUP Alliance	9,895	32.54
L. Galbadrakh	Mongolian Social Democratic Party	8,000	26.31
B. Ganzorig	Independent	3,605	11.86
Ch. Baatar	Independent	1,665	5.48
S. Jargalsaikhan	Mongolian United Party of Private Owners	1,641	5.40
D. Batsükh	Mongolian Bourgeois Party	1,571	5.17
P. Zorig	Mongolian Bourgeois Party	1,366	4.49
Yo. Gerelchuluun	Mongolian Renaissance Party	1,322	4.35
D. Altangerel	Mongolian United Party of Herdsman and Farmers	976	3.21
Ts. Dashzeveg	Mongolian Party for Independence	333	1.10
Total		60,420	100.00
Valid votes		30,409	94.68
Invalid/blank votes		1,709	5.32
Total votes		32,118	100.00
Registered voters/turnout		33,137	96.92

Constituency 22. Ulaanbaatar
Candidate	Party	Votes	%
D. Batbaatar	Mongolian People's Revolutionary Party	31,966	54.98
T. Ochirkhüü	Mongolian People's Revolutionary Party	31,513	54.20
J. Byambajav	Mongolian People's Revolutionary Party	31,497	54.17
H. Jalbajav	Mongolian People's Revolutionary Party	27,887	47.96
G. Gankhuyag	MDP–MNPP–MUP Alliance	18,439	31.71
Z. Uürdmandakh	MDP–MNPP–MUP Alliance	16,203	27.87
Ch. Lkhagvajav	Mongolian Social Democratic Party	15,495	26.65
B. Jargalsaikhan	Mongolian Bourgeois Party	14,210	24.44
Z. Pürevjal	MDP–MNPP–MUP Alliance	13,920	23.94
K. Zardykhan	Mongolian Renaissance Party	13,309	22.89
D. Zorigt	Mongolian Party for Independence	7,186	12.36
G. Myagmarjav	Independent	5,523	9.50
B. Badraa	Mongolian United Party of Private Owners	3,600	6.19
V. Zanashir	Mongolian Bourgeois Party	3,592	6.18
Total		234,340	100.00
Valid votes		58,143	92.94
Invalid/blank votes		4,415	7.06
Total votes		62,558	100.00
Registered voters/turnout		66,667	93.84

Constituency 23. Ulaanbaatar
Candidate	Party	Votes	%
G. Ganbold	Mongolian People's Revolutionary Party	18,723	49.97
S. Zorig	MDP–MNPP–MUP Alliance	17,242	46.02
N. Enkhbayar	Mongolian People's Revolutionary Party	16,487	44.00
B. Enkhmandakh	Mongolian People's Revolutionary Party	15,527	41.44
P. Khatanbaatar	Mongolian Social Democratic Party	10,827	28.90
D. Mönkhbaatar	MDP–MNPP–MUP Alliance	8,337	22.25
O. Dashbalbar	Mongolian Party for Independence	7,847	20.94
Sh. Altangerel	MDP–MNPP–MUP Alliance	6,261	16.71
B. Bayarkhüü	Mongolian Bourgeois Party	2,792	7.45
D. Baljinnyam	Mongolian Renaissance Party	2,104	5.62
M. Ganbat	Mongolian Green Party	1,717	4.58
D. Pentsentavkhai	Independent	1,703	4.54
T. Lkhagvaa	Mongolian Renaissance Party	1,598	4.26
Ch. Jumdaan	Mongolian United Party of Herdsman and Farmers	1,244	3.32
Total		112,409	100.00
Valid votes		37,470	94.66
Invalid/blank votes		2,112	5.34
Total votes		39,582	100.00
Registered voters/turnout		42,220	93.75

Constituency 24. Ulaanbaatar
Candidate	Party	Votes	%
J. Urtnasan	Mongolian People's Revolutionary Party	19,423	51.41
Ts. Ganbat	Mongolian People's Revolutionary Party	19,176	50.76
Ts. Tovuusüren	Mongolian People's Revolutionary Party	17,020	45.05
Dash. Ganbold	MDP–MNPP–MUP Alliance	12,372	32.75
T. Chimeddorj	MDP–MNPP–MUP Alliance	8,832	23.38
D. Khuvitögöldör	MDP–MNPP–MUP Alliance	8,429	22.31
P. Ulaankhüü	Mongolian Social Democratic Party	8,312	22.00
R. Barsbold	Mongolian Renaissance Party	6,019	15.93
D. Byambaa	Mongolian Bourgeois Party	4,325	11.45
D. Baasan	Mongolian Religious Democratic Party–Mongolian People's Party	2,878	7.62
S. Tuyaa	Mongolian Green Party	2,226	5.89
G. Dejeekhüü	Mongolian United Party of Herdsman and Farmers	1,316	3.48
Ts. Sükhbaatar	Mongolian Party for Independence	1,237	3.27
I. Dorj	Mongolian United Party of Private Owners	1,192	3.16
Ch. Dambajav	Mongolian Party for Independence	1,182	3.13
Total		113,939	100.00
Valid votes		37,779	94.74
Invalid/blank votes		2,097	5.26
Total votes		39,876	100.00
Registered voters/turnout		43,069	92.59

Constituency 25. Ulaanbaatar
Candidate	Party	Votes	%
L. Enebish	Mongolian People's Revolutionary Party	29,135	56.65
T. Gandi	Mongolian People's Revolutionary Party	27,840	54.14
Ts. Gombosüren	Mongolian People's Revolutionary Party	26,600	51.72
S. Harangerel	Mongolian People's Revolutionary Party	23,804	46.29
B. Batbayar	Mongolian Social Democratic Party	23,473	45.64
Kh. Maam	MDP–MNPP–MUP Alliance	14,937	29.05
D. Batsükh	MDP–MNPP–MUP Alliance	13,769	26.77
B. Altanshand	MDP–MNPP–MUP Alliance	10,599	20.61
Yo. Amgalan	Independent	7,488	14.56
Ch. Chuluunbaatar	Mongolian Social Democratic Party	6,807	13.24
H. Enkhbat	Mongolian Bourgeois Party	6,736	13.10
J. Amarsanaa	Mongolian Renaissance Party	4,487	8.73
M. Rinchin	Mongolian United Party of Herdsman and Farmers	3,333	6.48
B. Erdev	Mongolian United Party of Private Owners	2,924	5.69
T. Sengedorj	Mongolian Party for Independence	2,304	4.48
L. Hyamandeleg	Mongolian Party for Independence	1,068	2.08
Total		205,304	100.00
Valid votes		51,426	94.39
Invalid/blank votes		3,058	5.61
Total votes		54,484	100.00
Registered voters/turnout		58,616	92.95

Constituency 26. Ulaanbaatar
Candidate	Party	Votes	%
P. Jasrai	Mongolian People's Revolutionary Party	32,717	63.92
J. Algaa	Mongolian People's Revolutionary Party	24,325	47.53
B. Ganbold	Mongolian People's Revolutionary Party	23,221	45.37
M. Enkhsaikhan	MDP–MNPP–MUP Alliance	22,194	43.36
D. Sugar	Mongolian People's Revolutionary Party	21,779	42.55
A. Ganbaatar	Mongolian Social Democratic Party	18,416	35.98
Ts. Bayarmaa	MDP–MNPP–MUP Alliance	13,539	26.45
B. Bat-Erdene	Independent	11,503	22.48
O. Zayaa	Mongolian United Party of Private Owners	7,181	14.03
A. Yundendorj	Mongolian Bourgeois Party	6,801	13.29
D. Sükhbaatar	Mongolian Religious Democratic Party–Mongolian People's Party	5,703	11.14
Ch. Vasha	Mongolian Party for Independence	4,179	8.17
D. Chimeddamba	Mongolian United Party of Herdsman and Farmers	3,475	6.79
N. Nyamdavaa	Mongolian Renaissance Party	3,413	6.67
D. Ganbold	Mongolian Party for Independence	2,720	5.31
T. Dorj	Mongolian Renaissance Party	2,255	4.41
L. Shiiter	Mongolian United Party of Private Owners	1,303	2.55
Total		204,724	100.00
Valid votes		51,181	93.89
Invalid/blank votes		3,333	6.11
Total votes		54,514	100.00
Registered voters/turnout		57,837	94.25

== Aftermath ==
The three parties of the Democratic Alliance, the MDP, the MNPP, and the MUP, announced their decision to unite into a single party shortly after the election results on 30 June 1992. The same day, during a joint nine-party opposition press conference, the parties highlighted vote splitting and different portions of representation, stating that the MPRP (with 90% parliamentary representation) received 50% of the total vote, while the other half was distributed among the many parties. The MDP, the MNPP, the MUP, and the Mongolian Renaissance Party, which ran independently, officially merged into the Mongolian National Democratic Party on 25 October 1992.

On 5 December 1993, the Mongolian Party for Independence, the Mongolian United Party of Herdsman and Farmers, and the Mongolian United Party of Private Owners merged to form the Mongolian Traditional United Party, a right-wing nationalist party.

Badamdorjiin Batkhishig, the deputy chairman of the MPRP's Central Committee, stated that the party was not celebrating its landslide victory due to Mongolia's dire economic situation. MPRP member of parliament-elect and economist, Puntsagiin Jasrai, was appointed as the next prime minister on 21 July 1992, during the plenary session of the State Great Khural. He formed an all-MPRP cabinet, which served its full four-year term.
