= Saruulsaikhany Tsengüün =

Mongolian politician (born 1997)

- Саруулсайханы Цэнгүүн

Member of the State Great Khural
- Incumbent
- Assumed office 2 July 2024
- Constituency: Closed list (2024–2028)

Personal details
- Born: 5 June 1997 (age 29) Ulaanbaatar, Mongolia
- Party: Democratic Party
- Education: Mongolian University of Science and Technology (BA); University of Finance and Economics (MA)

Saruulsaikhany Tsengüün (Mongolian: Саруулсайханы Цэнгүүн; born 5 June 1997) is a Mongolian politician serving as a member of the State Great Khural since 2024. At the age of 27, she was elected in the 2024 parliamentary election, representing the Democratic Party. She is the youngest member of the current legislature and the first Generation Z legislator of the State Great Khural.

== Early life and education ==
Tsengüün was born in Ulaanbaatar, the capital city of post-communist Mongolia, on 5 June 1997. She completed her primary education at the "King's Kids" middle school in 2004 and secondary education at "Iskra" high school in 2013.

In 2017, Tsengüün graduated with a bachelor's degree in Business Administration and Marketing Management from the School of Business Management and Humanities at the Mongolian University of Science and Technology. Later in 2022, she graduated with a master's in Financial Management from the University of Finance and Economics.

== Political career ==
In January 2024, Tsengüün became the Secretary for Development Policy of the opposition Democratic Party (DP). An advocate of the DP's center-right ideology of protecting free markets, private property, and freedom, she ran as a closed-list candidate, ranking fourth, for the DP in the 2024 parliamentary election. The party won around 30% of the party vote and 16 of the 48 proportional seats. At the age of 27, Tsengüün became the youngest legislator for the newly convened 9th State Great Khural and the first Generation Z lawmaker of Mongolia.
