= Jargalsaikhany Enkhbayar =

Mongolian international footballer

Personal information
- Full name: Jargalsaikhany Enkhbayar; Жаргалсайханы Энхбаяр
- Date of birth: 31 July 1977 (age 49)
- Place of birth: Mongolia
- Position: Goalkeeper

Senior career*
Years	Team	Apps	(Gls)
2003–2021	Khangarid	13	(0)

International career
2001–2005	Mongolia	12	(0)
- * Club domestic league appearances and goals

Jargalsaikhany Enkhbayar (Mongolian: Жаргалсайханы Энхбаяр; born 31 July 1977) is a Mongolian international footballer. He made his first appearance for the Mongolia national football team in 2001.

== Career statistics ==
=== International ===
Appearances and goals by national team and year
National team	Year	Apps	Goals
Mongolia	2001	3	0
Mongolia	2002	–	
Mongolia	2003	6	0
Mongolia	2004	–	
Mongolia	2005	3	0
Total		12	0
