= National Coalition (Mongolia) =

Political coalition in Mongolia

National Coalition Үндэсний Эвсэл
- Abbreviation: NC (English); ҮЭ (Mongolian)
- Leader: Nyamtaishiryn Nomtoibayar
- Founded: 29 January 2024
- Headquarters: Ulaanbaatar
- Ideology: Big tent Anti-corruption
- Political position: Centre-right
- Coalition parties: Mongolian Green Party; Mongolian National Democratic Party; Mongolian Liberal Democratic Party
- Colors: Teal Green
- Slogan: Үндэстнээрээ баяжья! ("Let's thrive as a nation!")
- State Great Khural: 4 / 126
- Provincial Governors: 0 / 21
- Ulaanbaatar District Governors: 0 / 9

Website
- evsel.mn

The National Coalition (Mongolian: Үндэсний Эвсэл, romanized: Ündesnii Evsel, ÜE) is a political alliance in Mongolia, founded in January 2024 by Nyamtaishiryn Nomtoibayar. The coalition was initially composed of only the Mongolian Green Party and the Mongolian National Democratic Party. The Mongolian Liberal Democratic Party joined the coalition in May 2024.

== History ==
=== Background ===
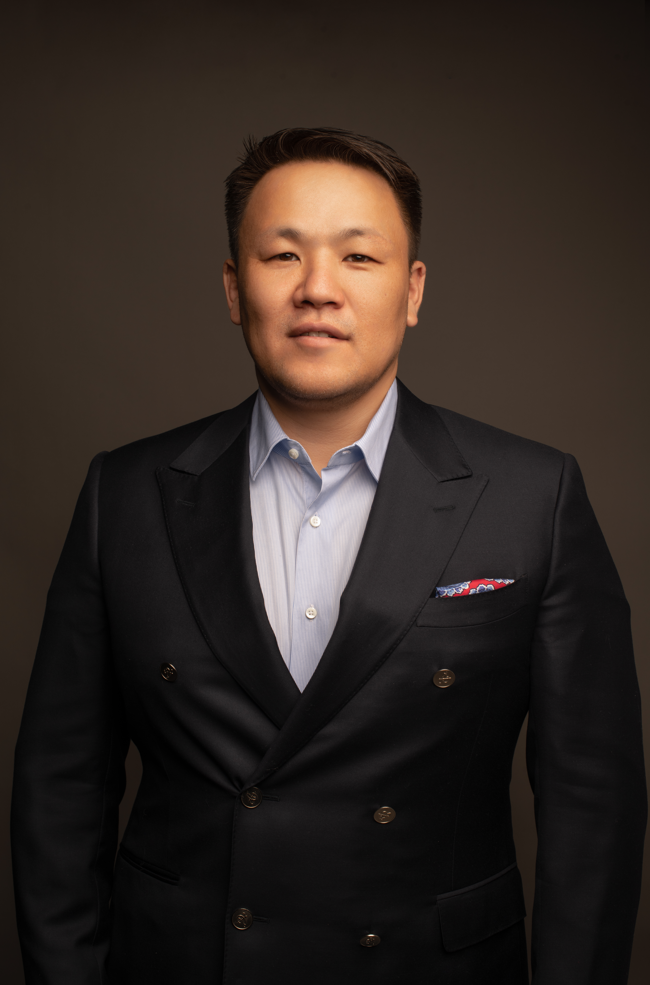
Nyamtaishiryn Nomtoibayar, the coalition founder and leader since 2024

Nyamtaishiryn Nomtoibayar, the current chairman of the National Coalition, is a former member of the Mongolian People's Party (MPP) and served as a member of parliament (MP) from 2012 to 2020, and also as Minister of Labour from 2016 to 2017.

In January 2020, he was expelled from the ruling party due to allegations of unparliamentary behavior and internal party disagreements. He ran as an independent in the 2020 parliamentary election, but failed to be re-elected as an MP. Later on 9 July 2020, he was arrested and sentenced to 5 years and 5 months in prison for abusing power as Labour Minister back in 2017. He was released from prison on 1 April 2021, after serving nine months.

=== Founding ===
For his bid in the 2024 parliamentary elections, Nomtoibayar began a series of negotiations with the Mongolian Green Party (MGP), the third-oldest registered political party in Mongolia. MP Togmidyn Dorjkhand of the National Labour Party criticized the deal and accused the Green Party of being sold to Nomtoibayar.

Both the 14th Party Congress of the MGP on January 19 and the 5th Party Congress of the Mongolian National Democratic Party on January 20 approved the decision to establish a new political coalition. The National Coalition, consisting of the MGP and the MNDP, chose Nomtoibayar as its leader on 29 January 2024. The Mongolian Liberal Democratic Party joined the coalition on May 15.

In the 2024 parliamentary election, the coalition nominated a total of 67 candidates. Out of the 67 candidates, 24 were nominated in a closed party list, while the remaining 43 were nominated in multi-member constituencies. The list included chairman Nomtoibayar himself and various other party leaders within the coalition. The coalition managed to win 4 out of 126 seats in the State Great Khural through proportional representation.

In the aftermath of the 2025 Mongolian political crisis, the National Coalition joined a new coalition government led by Prime Minister and MPP Chairman Nyam-Osoryn Uchral. Coalition leader Nomtoibayar was appointed Deputy Prime Minister on 4 April 2026.

== Ideology ==
During the 2024 parliamentary election campaign, Nomtoibayar proclaimed that the coalition was founded under a "national democratic" ideology (Үндэсний ардчилсан үзэл). The primary objective of the National Coalition is to end the partisan politics, combat political corruption, and uphold national interests and democratic values. Additionally, the coalition stated it aims to transform Mongolia into an industrialized, manufacturing-based economy through a pragmatic and technocratic approach.

== Composition ==
Party	Abbr.	Leader	Position	Ideology
Mongolian Green Party; Монголын Ногоон Нам; Mongolyn Nogoon Nam	MGP; МНН	Olzodyn Bum-Yalagch (2012–2026) Undraa Agvaanluvsan (since 2026)	Centre-left	Green politics Progressivism
Mongolian National Democratic Party; Монгол Үндэсний Ардчилсан Нам; Mongol Ündesnii Ardchilsan Nam	MNDP; МҮАН	Bayanjargalyn Tsogtgerel	Centre-right	Conservatism; Mongolian nationalism
Mongolian Liberal Democratic Party; Монголын Либерал Ардчилсан Нам; Mongolyn Liberal Ardchilsan Nam	MLDP; МоЛАН	Davaakhüügiin Pürevdavaa	Centre-right	Liberal conservatism

== Electoral history ==
=== State Great Khural election ===
Election	Leader	Constituency				Party list				Total seats		Position	Status
Election	Leader	Votes	%	Seats	+/-	Votes	%	Seats	+/-	No.	+/–	Position	Status
2024	Nyamtaishiryn Nomtoibayar	291,166	3.11	0 / 78	0	75,196	5.17	4 / 48	▲4	4 / 126	▲4	4th	Opposition (2024–2026)
2024	Nyamtaishiryn Nomtoibayar	291,166	3.11	0 / 78	0	75,196	5.17	4 / 48	▲4	4 / 126	▲4	4th	Coalition government (since 2026)
