= Undraa Agvaanluvsan =

Mongolian politician (born 1973)

Agvaanluvsangiin Undraa
- Агваанлувсангийн Ундраа
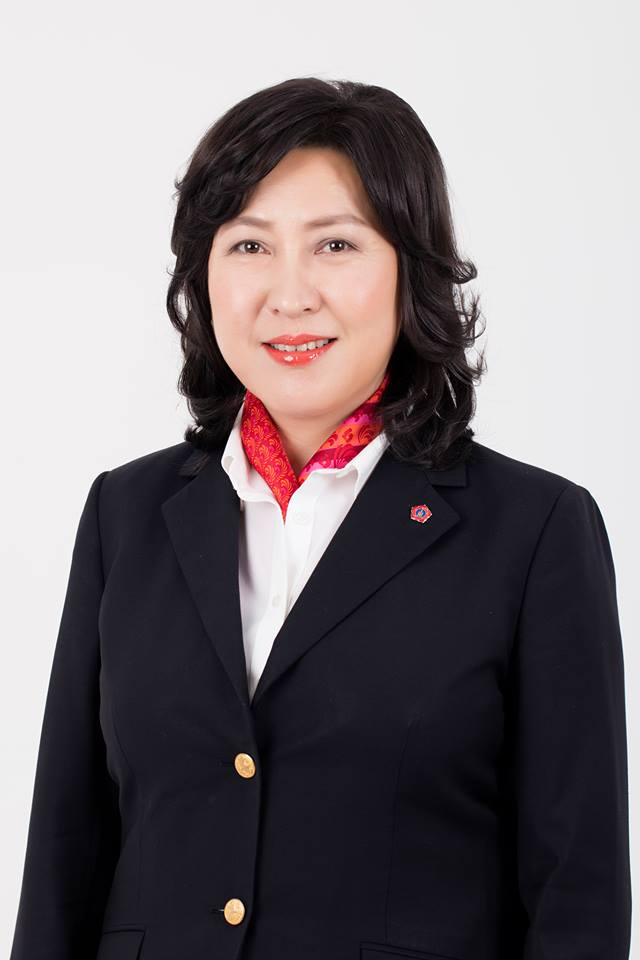

Member of the State Great Khural

Personal details
- Born: 1973 (age 52–53) Ulaanbaatar, Mongolia
- Party: National Coalition
- Spouse: Dr. Dashdorj Dugersuren
- Children: 2

Agvaanluvsangiin Undraa (Mongolian: Агваанлувсангийн Ундраа; born in 1973), or also referred to as Undraa Agvaanluvsan, is a Mongolian politician who has been a member of the State Great Khural since 2016.

== Early life and career ==
Undraa was born in 1973 in Ulaanbaatar, Mongolia. Upon completion of her secondary education at the first and only intensive school of mathematics and physics at the time in Mongolia, Undraa attended the National University of Mongolia where she studied physics, graduating with a bachelor's degree in 1994 and a master's degree in 1995. Undraa then continued her studies in physics at the International Centre for Theoretical Physics in Trieste, Italy where she received a diploma in high energy physics in 1997. She was awarded her PhD from North Carolina State University in Raleigh, North Carolina in 2002, studying nuclear reactions and quantum chaos in nuclei and becoming a Doctor of Philosophy in Physics at the age of 29.

=== Lawrence Livermore National Laboratory ===
Following her studies, Undraa conducted post-doctoral research and worked as a post-doctoral staff member and research scientist at North Carolina State University and the Lawrence Livermore National Laboratory. She published and co-authored several dozen articles in peer-reviewed journals.

=== Stanford University ===
Undraa was a CISAC science fellow and visiting professor during 2008–2010, and an affiliate from 2010 to date. Her research interests at CISAC focused on nuclear energy studies. At Stanford, Undraa directed an undergraduate research project under the auspices of the Bing Overseas Studies Program. She also taught nuclear energy policy in the International Policy Studies program.

=== Return to Mongolia ===
Upon returning to Mongolia, Undraa was appointed as deputy director of the Institute of Strategic Studies of the National Security Council and was advisor to the Minister of Mineral Resources and Energy. In 2010, Undraa was appointed as Ambassador-at-large at the Ministry of Foreign Affairs of Mongolia.

She is a co-chair of Mongolia chapter of the Women Corporate Directors, a global organisation of women who serve on public and private boards. Undraa has served and serves on several corporate and advisory boards of reputable organisations including the Mongolian Oil Shale Company and the advisory board of Rio Tinto Mongolia which develops the Oyu Tolgoi mine, one of the world's largest copper-gold mines and is located in the South Gobi region of Mongolia.

== Political career ==
=== Strategy Academy ===
Prior to being elected as a Member of Parliament in 2016, Undraa worked as a director of the Strategy Academy, a think-tank affiliated with the Mongolian People's Party, which was originally established in 1955. A decision was made in October 2013 at the 27th Party Congress of the Mongolian People's Party to reform and re-organise the Strategy Academy as an independent policy research institute. This reform was led by Undraa working towards re-establishing the Strategy Academy as Mongolia's leading independent multidisciplinary research organisation and developing reformative public policies and strategic policy advice through rigorous analysis of the socio-economic development of the country. During her tenure as the director of the Strategy Academy, the Strategy Academy developed the Mongolian People's Party's manifesto for the General Election 2016 based on its one-year research targeting the pressing needs of the every branches of the society. Undraa was instrumental in carrying out the opinion polls for the General Election 2016 and in the candidate selection for the General Election 2016 which resulted in the Mongolian People's Party winning 65 of the Parliament's 76 seats.

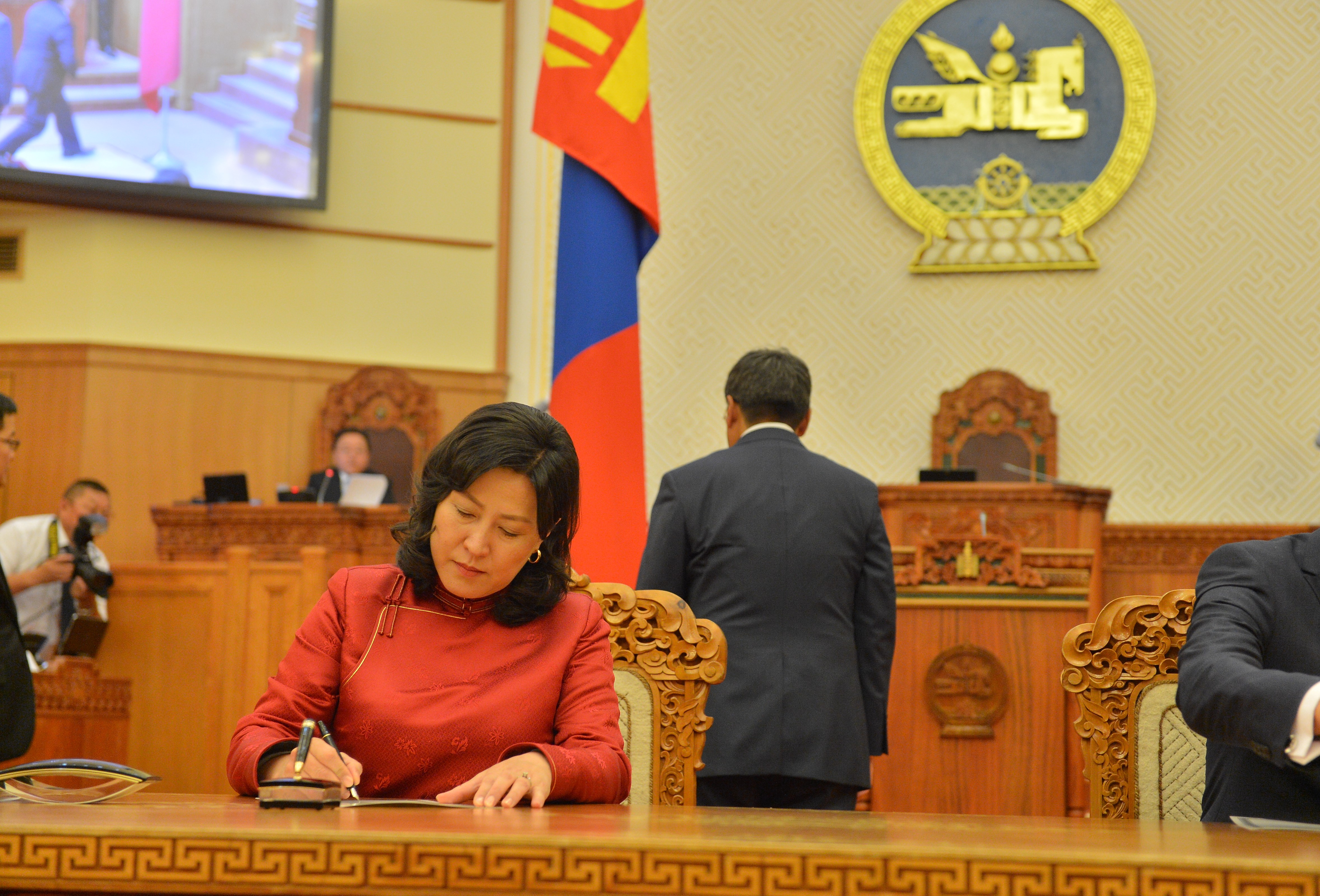
Undraa Agvaanluvsan during the swearing-in ceremony

=== Member of Parliament ===
Undraa was elected as the member of the Parliament for Bayangol District, Ulaanbaatar (constituency 67) in 2016 from the Mongolian People's Party. As a Member of Parliament, Undraa serves on the Standing Committee on Security and Foreign Policy and the Standing Committee on Social Policy, Education, Culture and Science respectively.

On 10 February 2018, she was appointed as a chair of the Parliamentary Subcommittee on Sustainable Development.

=== Responsible Mining Support Group within the Parliament of Mongolia ===
Undraa initiated the establishment of the Responsible Mining Support Group in the Parliament whereby the Responsible Mining Support Group was established by MPs A. Undraa, L.Amarzayaa, G.Temuulen, O.Sodbileg, B.Batzorig, Ts.Garamjav, Y.Sodbaatar and J.Bat-Erdene on 14 February 2017.

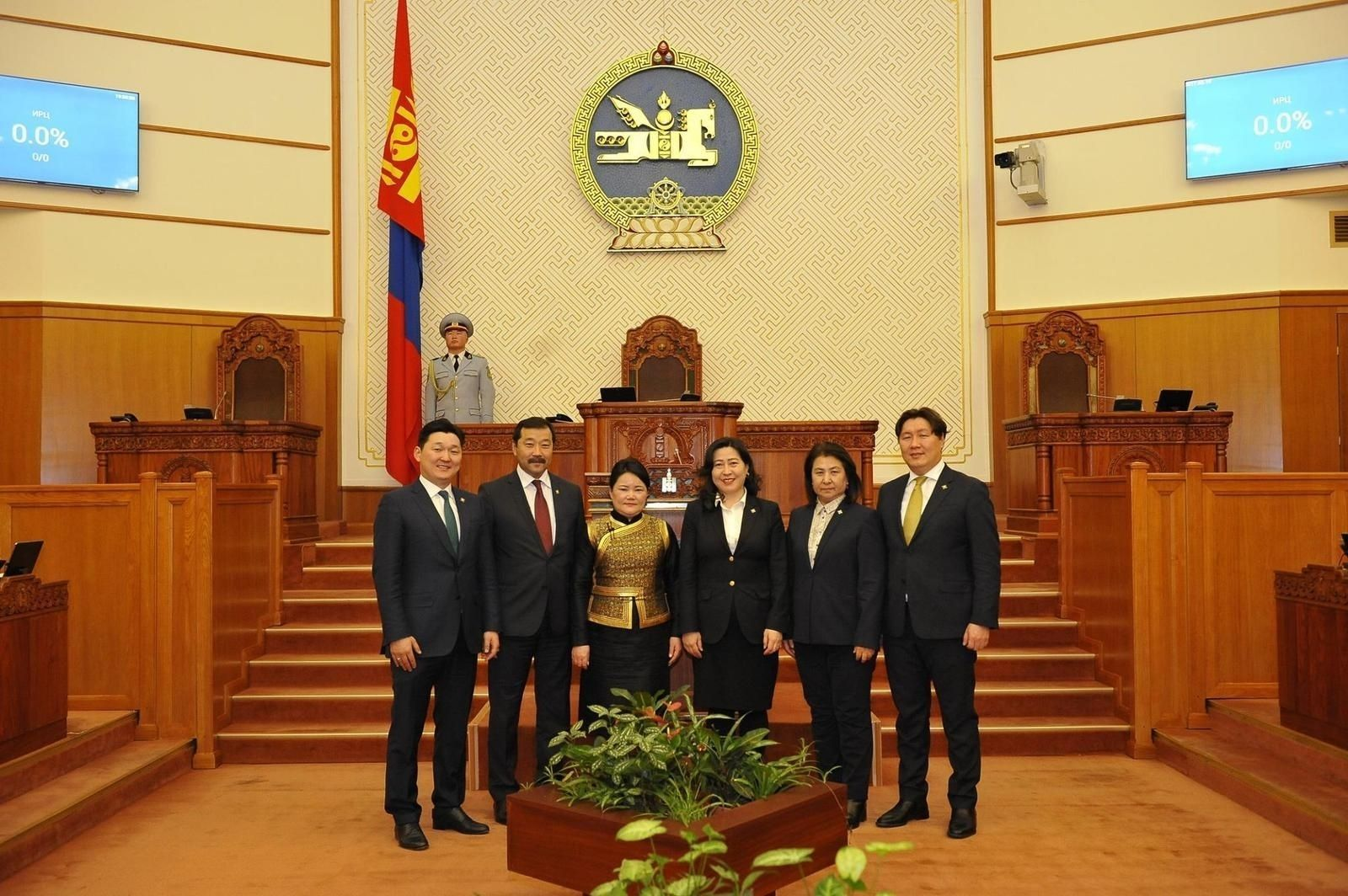
Responsible Mining Lobby Group

== Awards ==
Undraa's awards and honors include the Distinguished Service Award of the Petroleum Industry of Mongolia, Distinguished Service Award of Environmental Protection for Mongolia, and an Asia 21 Fellow of Asia Society. She is President-emeritus of MASA - Mongolian US Alumni Association.

== Personal life ==
Undraa is married to fellow nuclear physicist Dr. Dashdorj Dugersuren. They have two sons.

=== Mitchell Foundation ===
With her husband Dr. Dashdorj Dugersuren, Undraa co-founded the Mitchell Foundation, with a mission to support science, education and leadership development. The Mongolia Young Leaders Program which Undraa and Dr. Dashdorj Dugersuren initiated has grown into the largest program of its kind intended for bright young Mongolians studying all around the world and span off as a separate program called the Mongolian Young Leaders Network of which Undraa remains as an Honorary President.

=== Mongolian Federation of Draughts ===
Undraa is the President of the Mongolian Federation of Draughts. Upon assuming this position, she stated that she would make much effort to convince the younger generation to take up draughts at an early age and shared her intention to set up draughts clubs at the secondary schools.
