= Ganzorigiin Temüülen =

Mongolian politician

Ganzorigiin Temuulen
- Ганзоригийн Тэмүүлэн
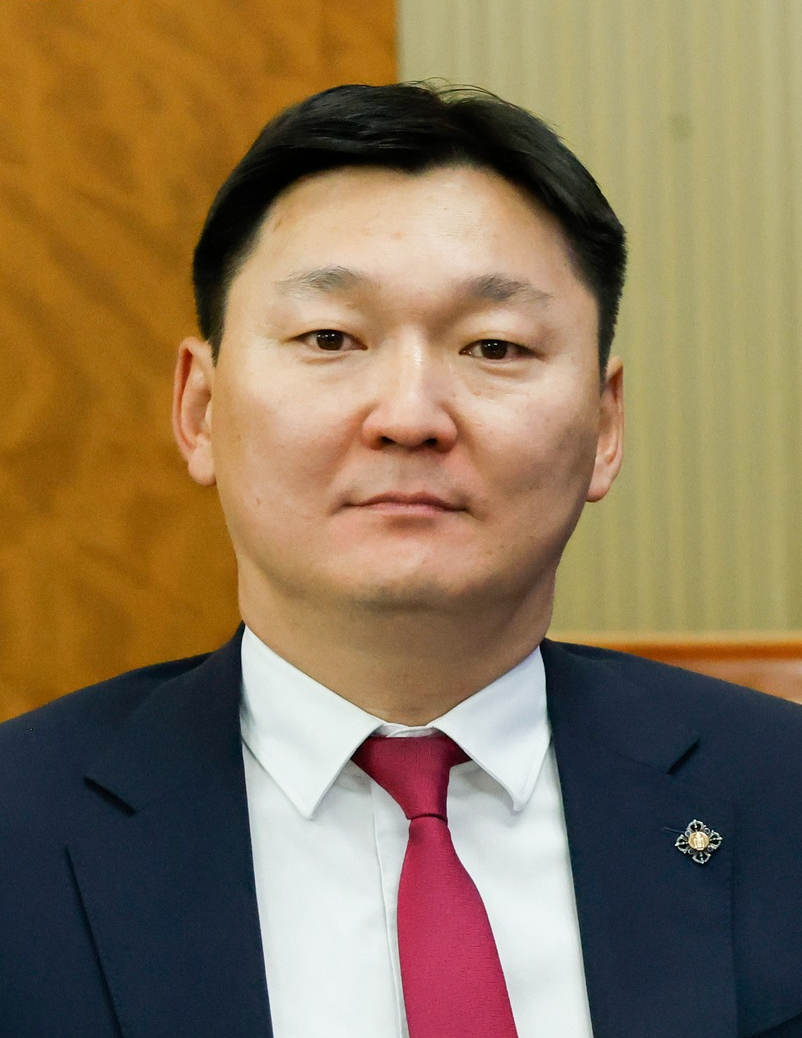
- Temuulen in 2025

Member of the State Great Khural Chairman of the Standing Committee on Security and Foreign Policy
- Incumbent
- Assumed office 5 July 2016
- Constituency: 1st, Arkhangai, Bayankhongor, Övörkhangai Province (2024–2028); 1st, Arkhangai Province (2020–2024); 1st, Arkhangai Province (2016–2020)

Personal details
- Born: January 10, 1981 (age 45) Ikh Tamir, Arkhangai, Mongolia
- Party: Mongolian People's Party
- Education: Dickson College; American University (BA) & (MA)

Ganzorigiin Temuulen (Mongolian: Ганзоригийн Тэмүүлэн; born 10 January 1981), also referred to as Temuulen Ganzorig, is a Mongolian politician who has served as a member of the State Great Khural, the unicameral parliament of Mongolia, since 2016. A member of the Mongolian People's Party (MPP), he represents a constituency that includes Arkhangai, Bayankhongor, and Uvurkhangai provinces. Temuulen has been re-elected to parliament in 2016, 2020, and 2024, serving multiple terms and holding several leadership positions in parliamentary committees. From 2022 until 2024, he served as chairman of the Standing Committee on Budget. He currently serves as chairman of the Standing Committee on Security and Foreign Policy of the State Great Khural.

== Early life and education ==
Temuulen was born in Ikh Tamir, Arkhangai Province, on 10 January 1981. He attended Dickinson College in Canberra, Australia before attending university.

He pursued higher education in the US, studying international relations and management at the American University in Washington, D.C., where he earned a bachelor's degree in 2003 and later earned a Master's degree in International Public Administration from the same institution in 2005. During his college years, Temuulen participated in the free-style wrestling team and received acclaim.

== Early career ==
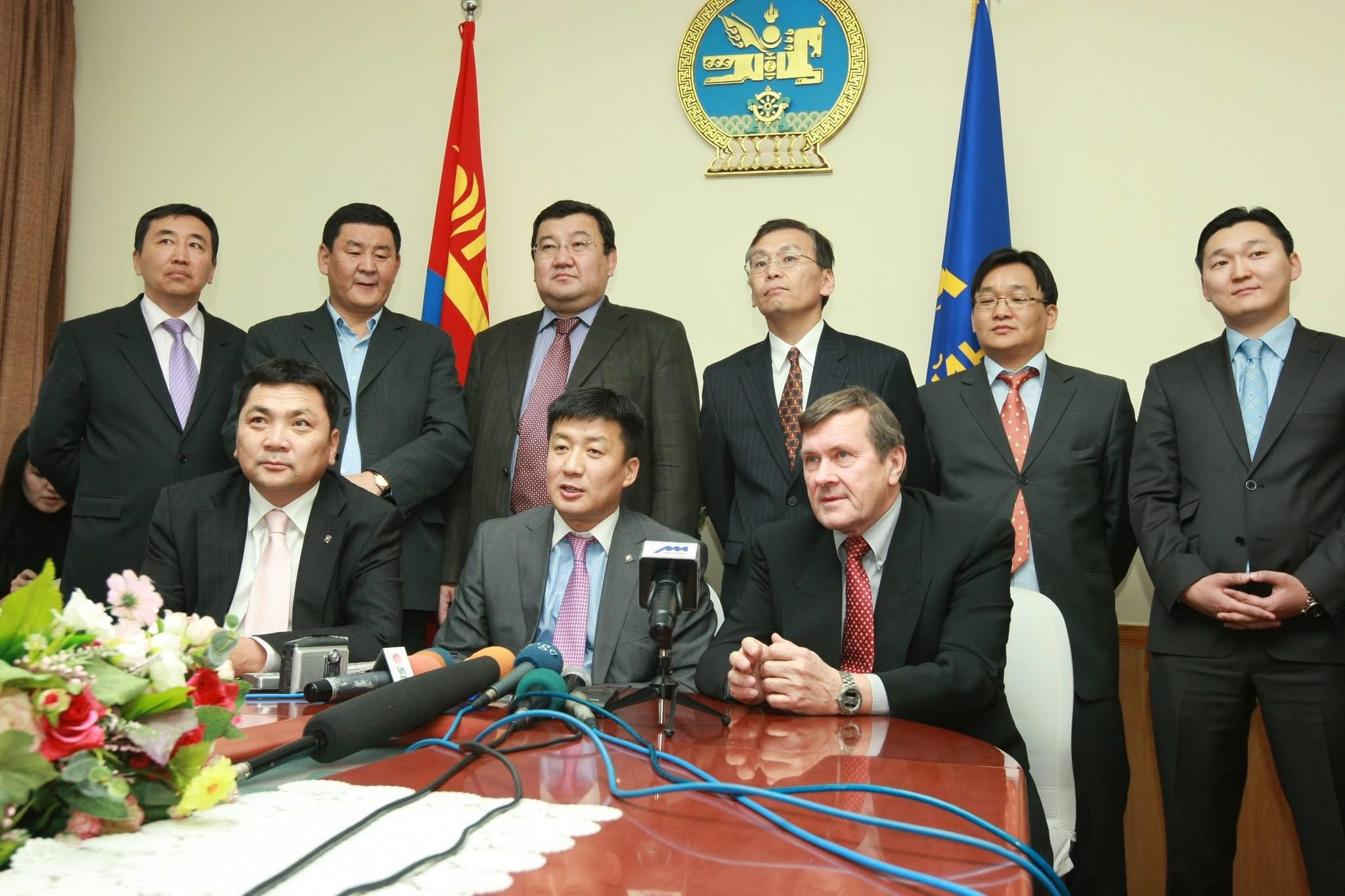
Oyu Tolgoi working group presenting the commencement of the mining project to the public

Temuulen began his professional career in Mongolia's mineral resources sector. From 2006 to 2009, he worked at the Mineral Resource Authority of Mongolia, where he progressed from officer to senior officer and later head of the contract department. During his time at the contract department, Temuulen headed the working group which led to the 2009 Oyu Tolgoi investment agreement.

In 2009, he became deputy director of Erdenes Mongol, the country's principal state-owned enterprise responsible for representing the government's ownership and interests in matters involving strategically significant mineral deposits, a position he held until 2014. During this period, he also served as board member of Oyu Tolgoi from 2013 to 2015. In 2014, he was appointed to the government cabinet as Vice Minister of Mining and Heavy Industry. He held both positions until his resignation in 2015 in protest to the new Oyu Tolgoi agreement, commonly referred to as the Dubai agreement. Temuulen publicly protested to the newly proposed agreement, which would delay Mongolia's dividend from the mining project for years.

== Political career ==
Temuulen became active in party politics through the Mongolian People's Party (MPP). From 2015 to 2020 he served as President of the Social Democratic Youth (SDY), the youth organisation of MPP and was a member of the MPP's governing board.

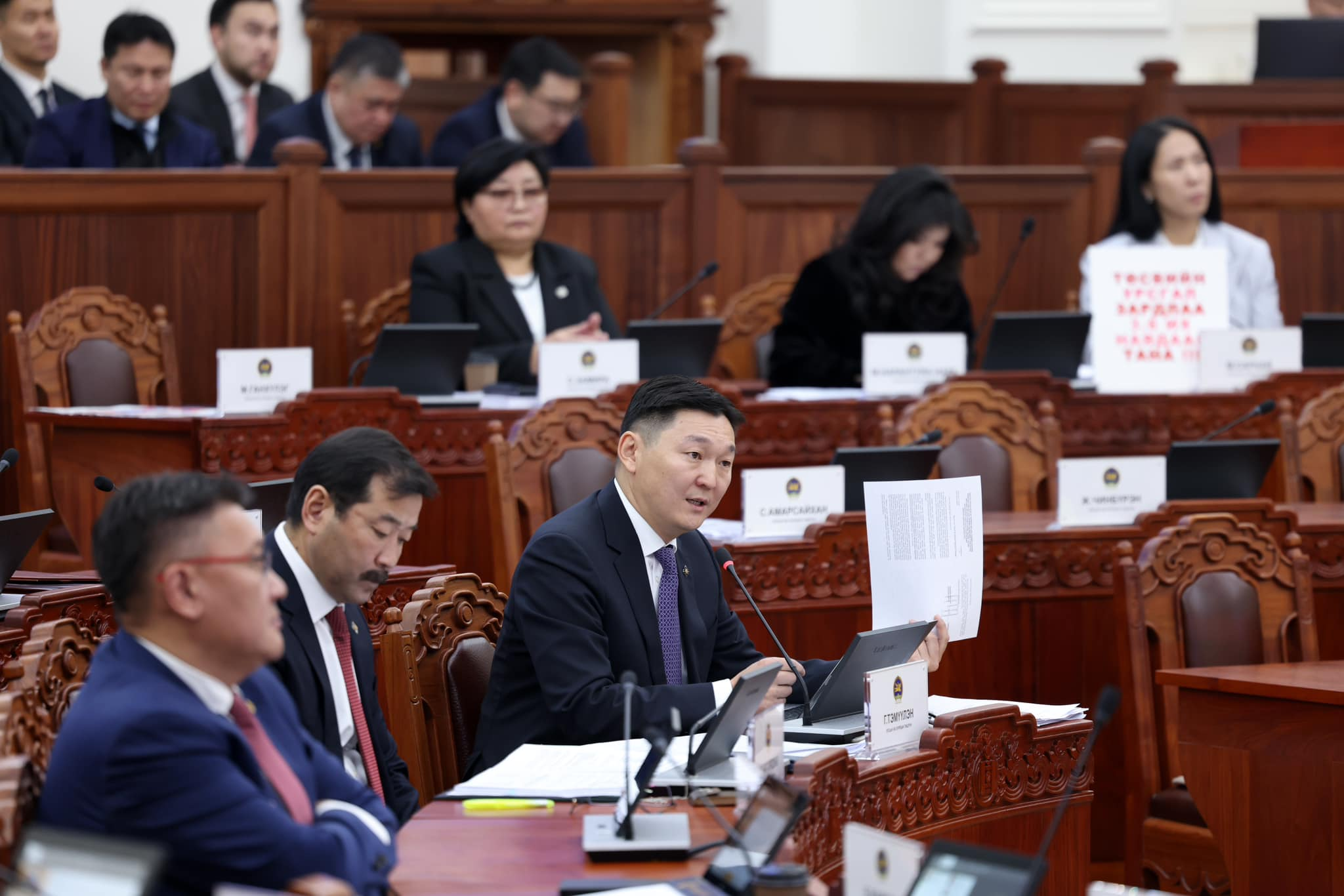
Temuulen Ganzorig speaking during parliament session.

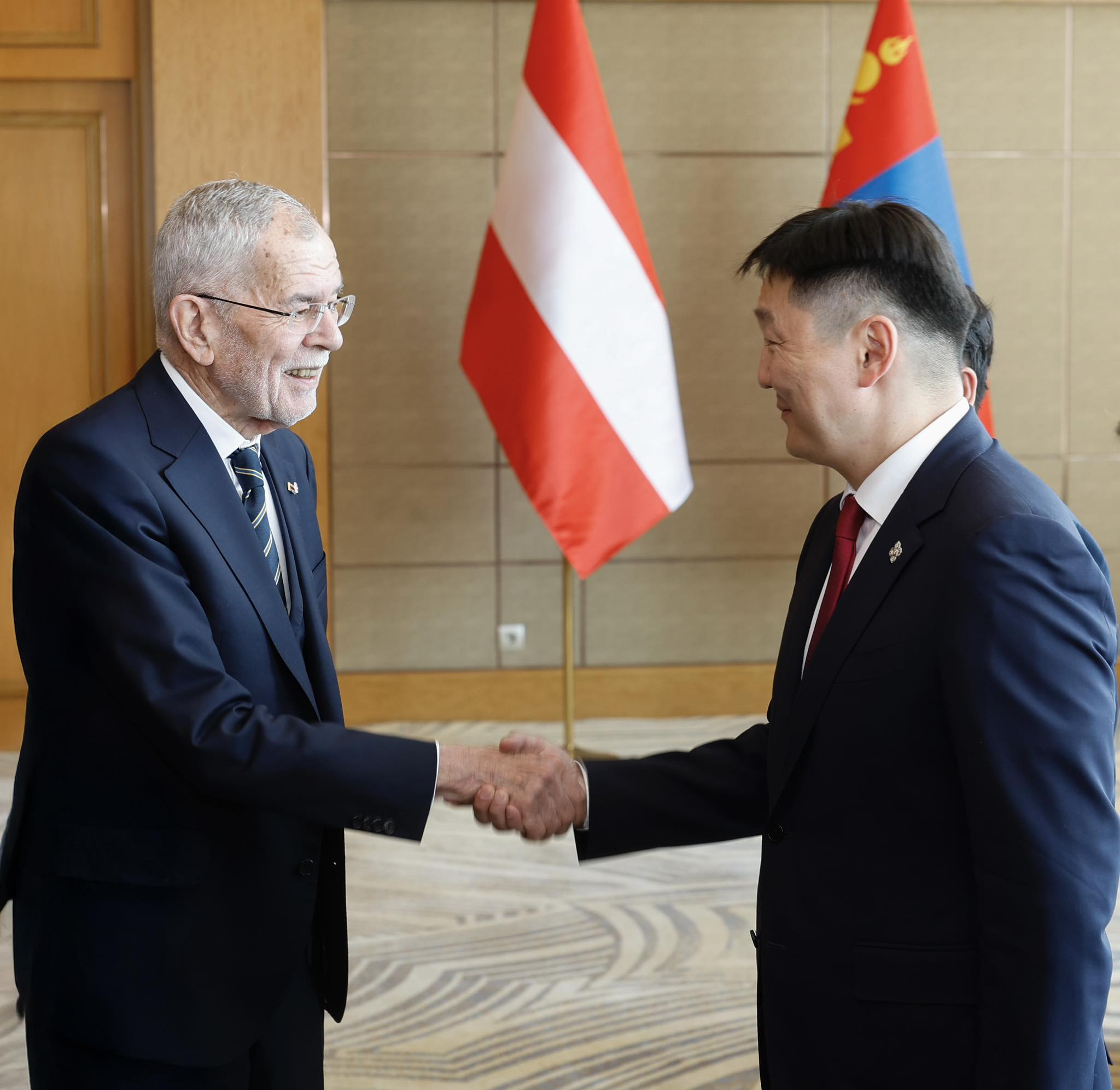
Temuulen Ganzorig with Van der Bellen, President of Austria.

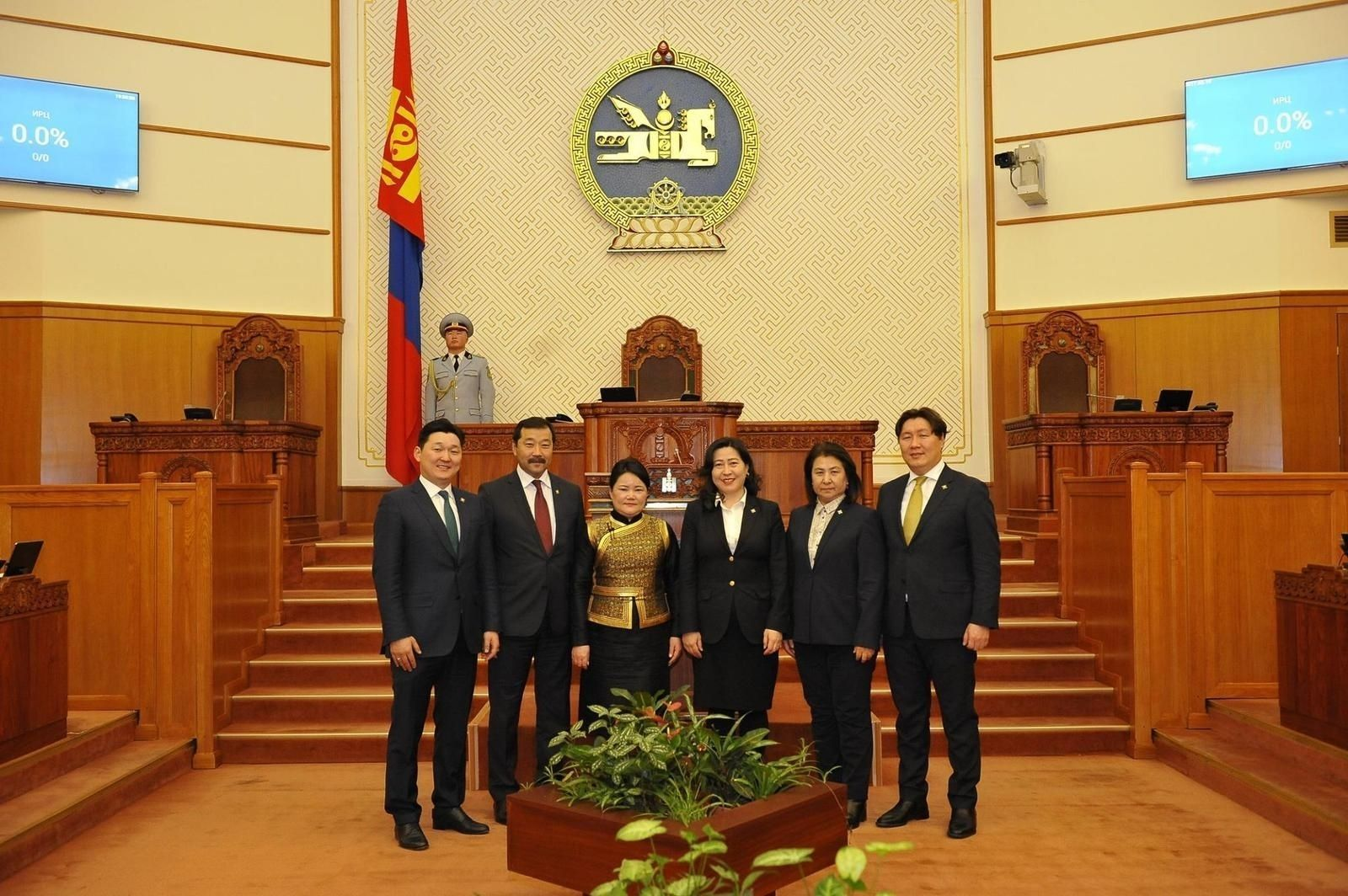
Temuulen on the far-left with the Responsible Mining Lobby Group in 2016.

In the 2016 Mongolian parliamentary election, Temuulen was elected to the State Great Khural representing Arkhangai Province. He was re-elected in the 2020 Mongolian parliamentary election and again in the 2024 Mongolian parliamentary election, representing Arkhangai, Uvurkhangai and Bayankhongor, marking his third consecutive term in parliament.

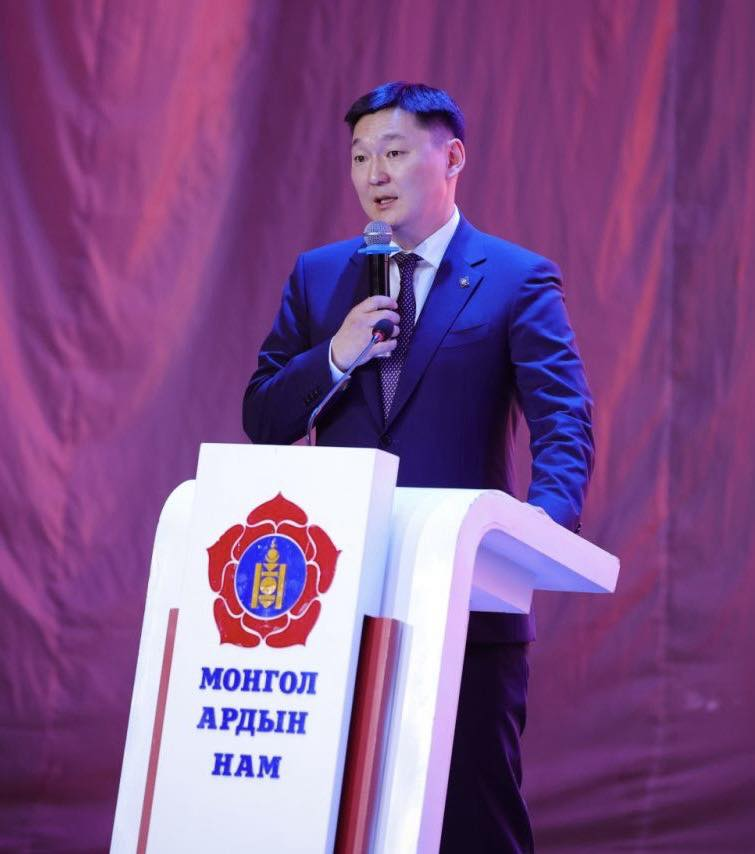
Temuulen speaking during MPP's 30th party congress, where he stood as candidate for the office of Prime Minister of Mongolia.

During his tenure in parliament, Temuulen has held several leadership roles. From 2022 to 2024 he served as chairman of the Budget Standing Committee of the State Great Khural. In 2024 he became chairman of the Standing Committee on Security and Foreign Policy, where he has been involved in discussions on Mongolia's international relations and foreign policy direction. He has also participated in inter-parliamentary diplomacy, including leading delegations in meetings between the Mongolian parliament and the European Parliament. Temuulen was re-elected as chairman of the Standing Committee on Security and foreign Policy in 2025.

== Personal life ==
Temuulen is fluent in English and Russian. He is married and has three children.
