= Chinbatyn Nomin =

Mongolian politician (born 1983)

- Чинбатын Номин
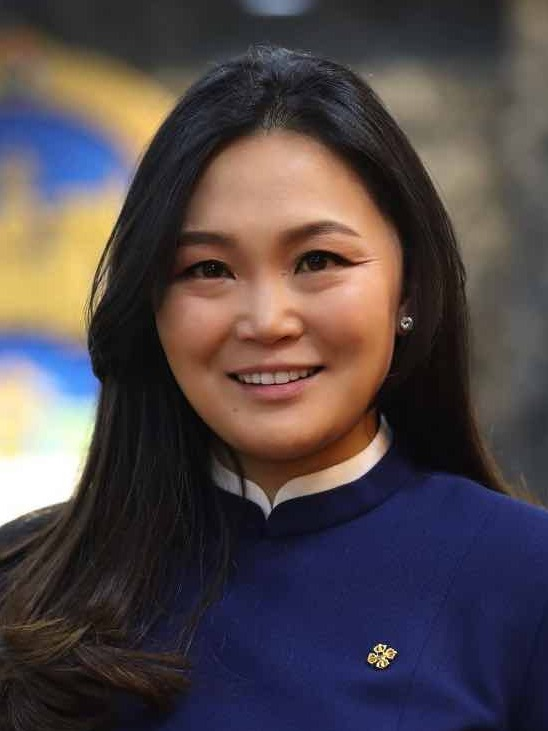
- Nomin in 2022

Minister of Culture, Sports, Tourism and Youth
- In office 10 July 2024 – 2025
- Preceded by: Position established

Minister of Culture
- In office January 2021 – 2024

Member of the State Great Khural
- Incumbent
- Assumed office June 2024
- Constituency: 11th, Songino Khairkhan

Personal details
- Born: 10 June 1983 (age 43) Ulaanbaatar, Mongolia
- Party: Mongolian People's Party
- Education: University of East Anglia

Chinbatyn Nomin (Mongolian: Чинбатын Номин; born 10 June 1983) is a Mongolian politician who served as the Minister of Culture, Sports, Tourism and Youth from July 2024 until 2025. She previously served as Minister of Culture from January 2021 and was elected to the State Great Khural in 2024.

== Early life and education ==
Nomin was born on 10 June 1983 and raised in Ulaanbaatar, the capital city of the Mongolian People's Republic.

She studied in the United Kingdom, first at Abbey College Cambridge and then at the University of East Anglia, where she obtained a Bachelor of Arts in economics and accounting in 2006.

== Career before politics ==
Before entering politics, Nomin worked in Mongolia’s media and hospitality sectors.

In 2008, she established the Terelj Hotel Ulaanbaatar, described in local media as one of Mongolia’s first five-star hotels.

The following year she founded Mongol HD Television and served as its chief executive officer until 2021. The station introduced international entertainment formats including Mongolia’s Got Talent, The Apprentice Mongolia, and The Voice Mongolia.

In 2015, she became the founding chair of the Mongolia Media Council, the country’s first self-regulatory press ombudsman. She was included in The Hollywood Reporter’s list of “Top 25 Women in Television” in 2013. Nomin left her media roles upon joining the government in 2021.

== Political career ==
=== Minister of Culture (2021–2024) ===
Nomin was appointed Minister of Culture in January 2021. During her term, parliament enacted a revised Law on Culture and a new Law on Museums, defining state policy toward cultural heritage management and museum operations.

Her ministry also supported measures to encourage film production in Mongolia, including the creation of the Mongolian National Film Council and related financial incentives.

These initiatives formed part of a wider government effort to expand the country’s cultural and creative sectors. Independent evaluation of their impact remains limited.

=== Minister of Culture, Sports, Tourism and Youth (2024–2025) ===
Nomin was elected to the State Great Khural in June 2024 and was subsequently appointed Minister of Culture, Sports, Tourism and Youth in Prime Minister Luvsannamsrain Oyun-Erdene’s coalition government.

Since 2023 she has also chaired the National Committee for International Communications and Media, a government body concerned with promoting Mongolia’s international image and coordinating cultural exchange policy.

She was elected Head of the International Women’s Organisation of Asian Political Parties in August 2023, a network associated with the International Conference of Asian Political Parties.

=== International cultural cooperation ===
In November 2023, Nomin attended the opening of The Mongol Khan at the London Coliseum, an English-language adaptation of a Mongolian stage production that received international media coverage. During the same visit, she signed cooperation agreements with the Royal Academy of Arts and the University of Cambridge concerning research on Mongolian art and heritage.

In 2024, the Ministry of Culture entered into promotional partnerships with Fulham F.C. and the travel platform Trip.com to support tourism branding initiatives.

=== Cultural heritage and artifact protection ===
In 2023, Nomin called for international cooperation to identify and repatriate Mongolian cultural artifacts held overseas, including items in the British Library and collections in Russia.

== Personal life ==
Nomin is married and has three children.
