= Enkhbayaryn Batshugar =

Mongolian politician

- Энхбаярын Батшугар
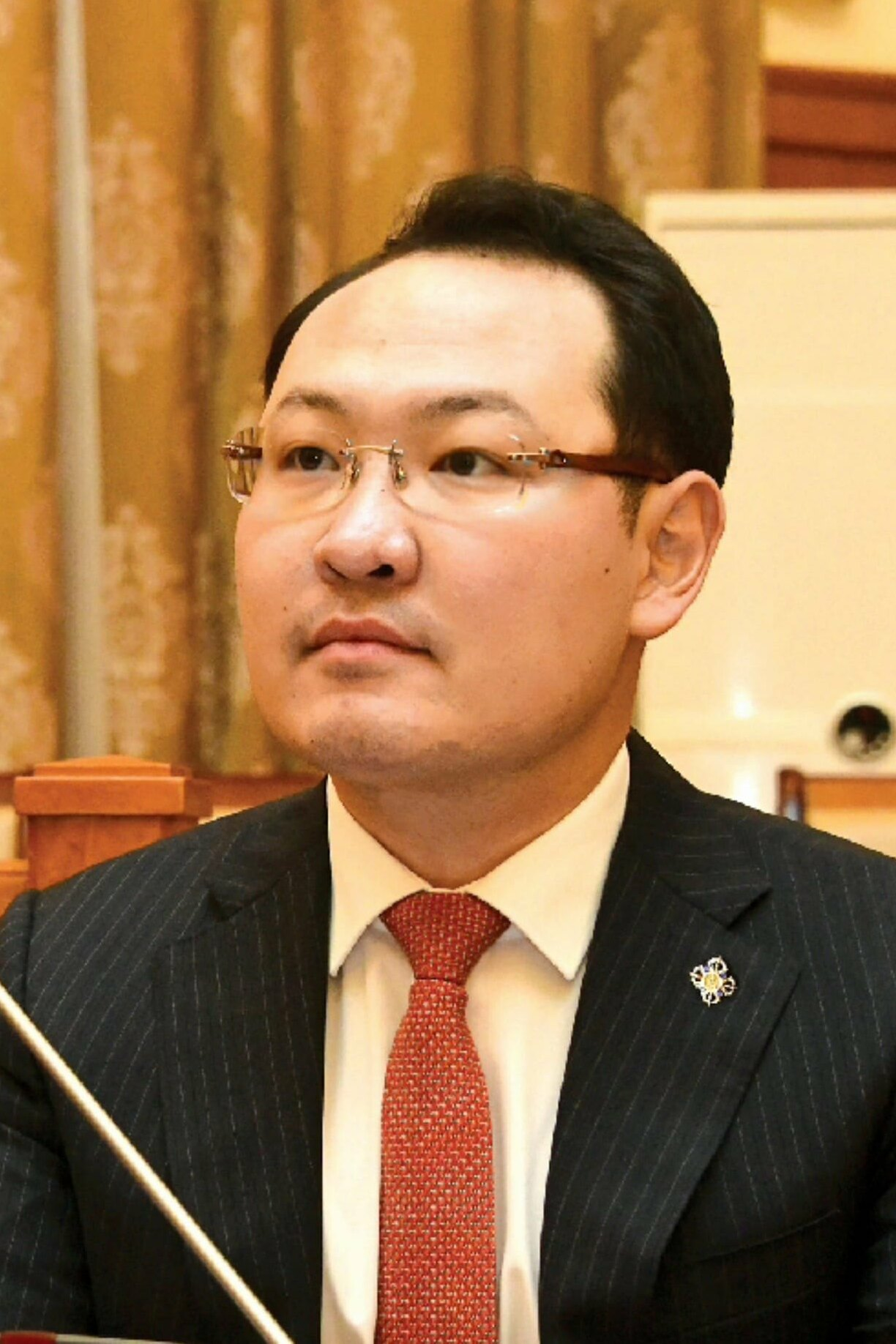
- Batshugar in 2022

Member of the State Great Khural
- Incumbent
- Assumed office 21 October 2021
- Preceded by: Dolgorsürengiin Sumyaabazar
- Constituency: Songino Khairkhan

Personal details
- Born: 19 May 1987 (age 39) Ulaanbaatar, Mongolia
- Party: Mongolian People's Party (since 2021)
- Other political affiliations: Mongolian People's Revolutionary Party (until 2021)
- Parent: Nambaryn Enkhbayar
- Education: Bentley University (BA)

Enkhbayaryn Batshugar (Mongolian: Энхбаярын Батшугар; born 19 May 1987), also referred to as Batshugar Enkhbayar, is a Mongolian politician who has served as Minister of Health since April 2026. Batshugar is a member of the State Great Khural, representing the Songino Khairkhan constituency since 2021. He was a member of the Mongolian People's Revolutionary Party, a splinter party founded by his father in 2010, until its 2021 merger with the Mongolian People's Party (MPP). Batshugar has been a member of the MPP since 2021.

== Biography ==
Batshugar was born on 19 May 1987 in Ulaanbaatar, Mongolia. His father is Nambaryn Enkhbayar, the third president of Mongolia. Batshugar attended high school in California, and later graduated from Bentley University in 2008 with a Bachelor's degree in finance and economics. From 2008 until 2011, he worked as an investment banker at JPMorgan Chase.

In 2012, following the arrest of Batshugar's father on corruption charges, a move seen by American officials as democratic backsliding, both were barred from running in the 2012 parliamentary election. Later in 2012, Batshugar was appointed deputy governor of the Bank of Mongolia, the country's central bank, and served until 2016. He then became a member of the board of directors of Mediaholding LLC, holding that role until 2021.

In 2020, Dolgorsürengiin Sumyaabazar resigned from the State Great Khural following his appointment as mayor of Ulaanbaatar. Batshugar successfully ran to replace Sumyaabazar, winning the October 2021 special election with 51% of the vote.

Batshugar was re-elected to the State Great Khural in July 2024 from the Songino Khairkhan 11th constituency, the second-largest district by population in Ulaanbaatar (approximately 340,000 residents). During his first term, he served as Chairman of the Standing Committee on Innovation and E‑Policy. In June 2025, he was appointed as Minister of Digital Development, Innovation, and Communications. In September 2025, the cabinet approved a "Digital First" policy guideline and Mongolia's first national artificial intelligence strategy, which runs until 2030.

After Nyam-Osoryn Uchral became prime minister, Batshugar was appointed Minister of Health in the new cabinet and took the oath of office in April 2026. In July 2026, during South Korean President Lee Jae Myung's state visit to Mongolia, he and the Korean Minister of Health and Welfare, Jeong Eun-kyeong, signed a revised health cooperation memorandum, the first update of the two countries' 2011 agreement, extending cooperation to areas including cancer control, AI-based digital health and regenerative medicine.
