= Nyamtaishiryn Nomtoibayar =

Mongolian politician (born 1978)

- Нямтайширын Номтойбаяр
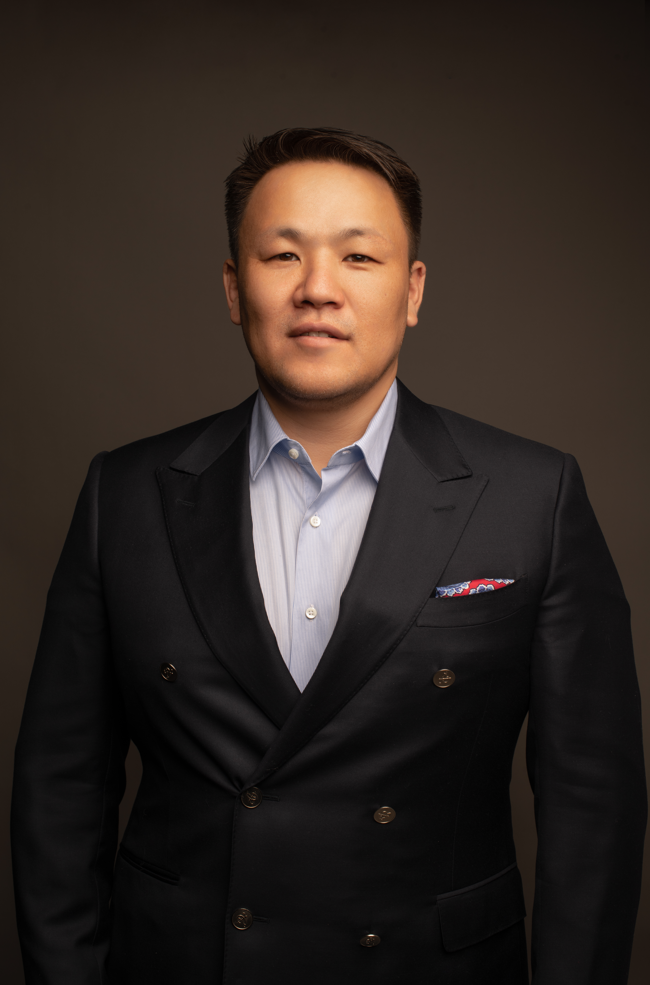
- Nomtoibayar in 2024

Deputy Prime Minister of Mongolia (Regional Development and Emergency Management)
- Incumbent
- Assumed office 2026

Minister of Labour and Social Protection
- In office 8 July 2016 – 7 September 2017
- Prime Minister: Jargaltulgyn Erdenebat
- Preceded by: Garidkhuugiin Bayarsaikhan
- Succeeded by: Sodnomiin Chinzorig

Leader of the National Coalition
- Incumbent
- Assumed office 19 January 2024
- Preceded by: Post established

Member of the State Great Khural
- Incumbent
- Assumed office 2 July 2024
- Constituency: Closed list

Member of the State Great Khural
- In office 6 July 2012 – 30 June 2020
- Constituency: 15th, Dornod Province (2016–2020); 7th, Dornod Province (2012–2016)

Personal details
- Born: 2 July 1978 (age 48) Ulaanbaatar, Mongolia
- Party: National Coalition (since 2024)
- Other political affiliations: Mongolian People's Party (until 2020)
- Education: Valparaiso University; HTW Berlin

Nyamtaishiryn Nomtoibayar (Mongolian: Нямтайширын Номтойбаяр; born 2 July 1978) is a Mongolian politician and the current Deputy Prime Minister of Mongolia, overseeing Regional Development and Emergency Management. He was elected as a member of the State Great Khural in 2012, 2016, and then again in 2024. He also served as Minister of Labour and Social Protection from 2016 to 2017.

== Political career ==
Nomtoibayar was a member of the Mongolian People's Party (MPP). He was first elected as a member of parliament in the 2012 parliamentary election, and later was re-elected in the 2016 parliamentary election. He was appointed Minister of Labour and Social Protection for the cabinet of Jargaltulgyn Erdenebat on 8 July 2016. He served as Labour Minister until September 2017, when Prime Minister Erdenebat resigned after losing a motion of no confidence.

Nomtoibayar was re-elected to the State Great Khural in the 2016 parliamentary election, where the MPP won a supermajority. However, his disagreements with other MPP members and unparliamentary behavior would lead to his expulsion from the ruling party in January 2020. He unsuccessfully ran as an independent in the 2020 parliamentary election.

On 9 July 2020, when legal proceedings for several former ministers and politicians began, he was arrested and sentenced to 5 years and 5 months in prison. The Supreme Court of Mongolia later overturned the sentence, ruling it groundless, though it imposed a separate one-year sentence on charges of negligence during his tenure as minister. He was released on 1 April 2021 after serving a total of nine months.

For his bid in the 2024 elections, Nomtoibayar formed the National Coalition with the Mongolian Green Party and the Mongolian National Democratic Party on 19 January 2024. The coalition won 4 out of 126 seats in the 2024 parliamentary elections. In 2026, Nomtoibayar was appointed Deputy Prime Minister of Mongolia, with responsibility for Regional Development and Emergency Management. He continues to serve as leader of the National Coalition.

== NGO and civil society work ==
Founded "Nomt Tusch" fund and served as the president in 2006.

President of the Social Democratic Youth of Mongolia (2010–2015).
