= List of members of the State Great Khural, 2020–2024 =

2020-2024 State Great Khural
←	2016–2020	2024–2028	→
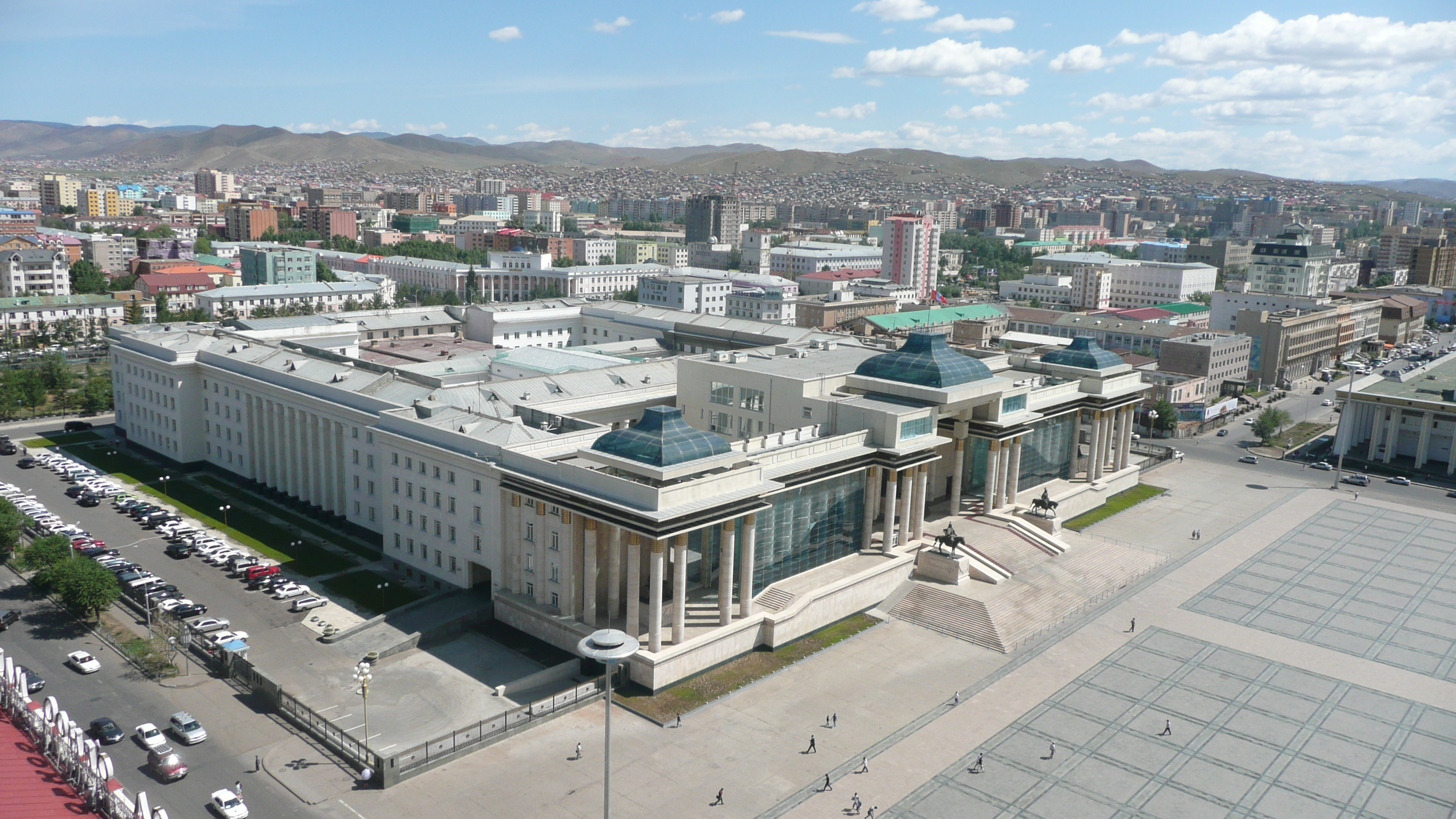
- Government Palace of Mongolia

Overview
- Legislative body: State Great Khural
- Jurisdiction: Mongolia
- Meeting place: Government Palace, Ulaanbaatar, Mongolia
- Term: 30 June 2020 – 2 July 2024
- Election: 24 June 2020
- Government: Khürelsükh II (until 21 January 2021); Oyun-Erdene I (since 29 January 2021)
- Website: www.parliament.mn

State Great Khural
- Members: 76
- Chairman: Gombojavyn Zandanshatar
- Deputy Chairmen: Tömörbaataryn Ayuursaikhan (until 6 February 2023); Lkhagvyn Mönkhbaatar (since 6 February 2023); Saldangiin Odontuyaa
- Prime Minister: Ukhnaagiin Khürelsükh (until 27 January 2021); Luvsannamsrain Oyun-Erdene (since 27 January 2021)
- Party control: Supermajority of the Mongolian People's Party

The 2020–2024 State Great Khural was the eighth session of the State Great Khural which first convened on 30 June 2020 and was seated until 2 July 2024. Its members were first elected in the 2020 parliamentary election held on 24 June 2020.

== Composition ==
In the 2020 parliamentary election, four political parties and one independent were elected to the parliament. The amount of political parties in parliament decreased to three in 2021, when the primary member of the Our Coalition, the Mongolian People's Revolutionary Party, merged with the ruling Mongolian People's Party.

Of the 76 members, 32 were elected to the State Great Khural for the first time, while 37 were re-elected in a consecutive term.

Party	Original elected seats	At dissolution			Floor leader
Party	Total	±	Total	%	Floor leader
Mongolian People's Party	62	Steady	62	81.6%	Dulamdorjiin Togtokhsüren
Democratic Party	11	Steady	11	14.5%	Odongiin Tsogtgerel
Our Coalition	1	▼1	0	0.0%	—N/a
Right Person Electorate Coalition	1	Steady	1	1.3%	—N/a
Independent	1	▲1	2	2.6%	—N/a
Totals	76	—	76	100.0%	

== List of members ==
Constituency	Member	Party	Notes
1st Arkhangai	Yondonperenlein Baatarbileg	Mongolian People's Party	
1st Arkhangai	~~Jamyangiin Mönkhbat~~	~~Mongolian People's Party~~	Resigned on 23 March 2023.
1st Arkhangai	Ganzorigiin Temüülen	Mongolian People's Party	
2nd Bayan-Ölgii	Khavdislamyn Badyelkhan	Mongolian People's Party	
2nd Bayan-Ölgii	Tyelukhany Aubakar	Mongolian People's Party	
2nd Bayan-Ölgii	Bulany Byeisyen	Democratic Party	
3rd Bayankhongor	Gombojavyn Zandanshatar	Mongolian People's Party	
3rd Bayankhongor	Dashdondogiin Ganbat	Democratic Party	
3rd Bayankhongor	Amgalangiin Adiyaasüren	Democratic Party	
4th Bulgan	Tsogt-Ochiryn Anandbazar	Mongolian People's Party	
4th Bulgan	Jadambyn Bat-Erdene	Mongolian People's Party	
5th Govi-Altai	Byambasürengiin Enkh-Amgalan	Mongolian People's Party	
5th Govi-Altai	Shatarbalyn Radnaased	Mongolian People's Party	
6th Dundgovi Govisümber	Sükhbaataryn Batbold	Mongolian People's Party	
6th Dundgovi Govisümber	Gompildoogiin Mönkhtsetseg	Mongolian People's Party	
7th Dornod	Khayangaagiin Bolorchuluun	Mongolian People's Party	
7th Dornod	Tsedeviin Sergelen	Mongolian People's Party	
8th Dornogovi	Borkhüügiin Delgersaikhan	Mongolian People's Party	
8th Dornogovi	Tömörtogoogiin Enkhtüvshin	Mongolian People's Party	
9th Zavkhan	Tsedendambyn Tserenpuntsag	Mongolian People's Party	
9th Zavkhan	Baljinnyamyn Bayarsaikhan	Mongolian People's Party	
10th Övörkhangai	Sodnomyn Chinzorig	Mongolian People's Party	
10th Övörkhangai	Dulamdorjiin Togtokhsüren	Mongolian People's Party	
10th Övörkhangai	Gochoogiin Ganbold	Mongolian People's Party	
11th Ömnögovi	Nanzadyn Naranbaatar	Mongolian People's Party	
11th Ömnögovi	Dashdembereliin Bat-Erdene	Democratic Party	
12th Sükhbaatar	Jambyn Batsuuri	Democratic Party	
12th Sükhbaatar	Nayantain Ganibal	Democratic Party	
13th Selenge	Jargaltulgyn Erdenebat	Mongolian People's Party	
13th Selenge	Chinbatyn Undram	Mongolian People's Party	
13th Selenge	Damdinsürengiin Önörbolor	Mongolian People's Party	
14th Töv	Jigjidiin Batjargal	Mongolian People's Party	
14th Töv	Tsevegdorjiin Tuvaan	Democratic Party	
14th Töv	Nyamaagiin Enkhbold	Mongolian People's Party	
15th Uvs	Odongiin Tsogtgerel	Democratic Party	
15th Uvs	Chimediin Khürelbaatar	Mongolian People's Party	
15th Uvs	Battogtokhyn Choijilsüren	Mongolian People's Party	
16th Khovd	Shirnenbanidiin Adishaa	Democratic Party	
16th Khovd	Bökhchuluuny Pürevdorj	Democratic Party	
16th Khovd	Sandagiin Byambatsogt	Mongolian People's Party	
17th Khövsgöl	Tserenpiliin Davaasüren	Mongolian People's Party	
17th Khövsgöl	Lkhagvyn Mönkhbaatar	Mongolian People's Party	
17th Khövsgöl	Luvsantserengiin Enkh-Amgalan	Mongolian People's Party	
18th Khentii	~~Ukhnaagiin Khürelsükh~~	Mongolian People's Party	Left automatically after he has inaugurated as President of Mongolia on 25 June 2021.
18th Khentii	Tsagaankhüügiin Iderbat	Mongolian People's Party	Took office on 21 October 2021.
18th Khentii	Luvsannamsrain Oyun-Erdene	Mongolian People's Party	
18th Khentii	Badmaanyambuugiin Bat-Erdene	Mongolian People's Party	
19th Darkhan-Uul	Boldyn Javkhlan	Mongolian People's Party	
19th Darkhan-Uul	Gongoryn Damdinnyam	Mongolian People's Party	
19th Darkhan-Uul	Baagaagiin Battömör	Mongolian People's Party	
20th Orkhon	Dambyn Batlut	Mongolian People's Party	
20th Orkhon	Norovyn Altankhuyag	Independent	Former Prime Minister of Mongolia and former Chairman of the Democratic Party.
20th Orkhon	Sainkhüügiin Ganbaatar	~~Our Coalition~~	He left the MPRP in April 2021 following their merger with the Mongolian People's Party and joined the Democratic Party
20th Orkhon	Sainkhüügiin Ganbaatar	Non-partisan	According to the Supreme Court's interpretation of the Law on Political Parties, his seat is not counted on Democratic Party.
21st Ulaanbaatar Bagakhangai Baganuur Nalaikh	Sainbuyangiin Amarsaikhan	Mongolian People's Party	
21st Ulaanbaatar Bagakhangai Baganuur Nalaikh	Tsendiin Sandag-Ochir	Mongolian People's Party	
22nd Ulaanbaatar Bayanzürkh	Battömöriin Enkhbayar	Mongolian People's Party	
22nd Ulaanbaatar Bayanzürkh	Batsükhiin Saranchimeg	Mongolian People's Party	
23rd Ulaanbaatar Bayanzürkh	Jigjidsürengiin Chinbüren	Mongolian People's Party	
23rd Ulaanbaatar Bayanzürkh	Khürelbaataryn Bulgantuya	Mongolian People's Party	
23rd Ulaanbaatar Bayanzürkh	Enkhtaivany Bat-Amgalan	Mongolian People's Party	
24th Ulaanbaatar Sükhbaatar	Damdiny Tsogtbaatar	Mongolian People's Party	
24th Ulaanbaatar Sükhbaatar	Tsendiin Mönkh-Orgil	Mongolian People's Party	
24th Ulaanbaatar Sükhbaatar	Tserenjamtsyn Mönkhtsetseg	Mongolian People's Party	
25th Ulaanbaatar Chingeltei	Tömörbaataryn Ayuursaikhan	Mongolian People's Party	
25th Ulaanbaatar Chingeltei	Mönkhöögiin Oyuunchimeg	Mongolian People's Party	
25th Ulaanbaatar Chingeltei	Jamiyankhorloogiin Sükhbaatar	Mongolian People's Party	
26th Ulaanbaatar Bayangol	Khassuuriin Gankhuyag	Mongolian People's Party	
26th Ulaanbaatar Bayangol	Jambalyn Ganbaatar	Mongolian People's Party	
26th Ulaanbaatar Bayangol	Saldangiin Odontuyaa	Democratic Party	
27th Ulaanbaatar Songino Khairkhan	~~Khishgeegiin Nyambaatar~~	Mongolian People's Party	Appointed as Mayor of Ulaanbaatar on 12 October 2023.
27th Ulaanbaatar Songino Khairkhan	Badarchiin Jargalmaa	Mongolian People's Party	
28th Ulaanbaatar Songino Khairkhan	Nyam-Osoryn Uchral	Mongolian People's Party	
28th Ulaanbaatar Songino Khairkhan	~~Dolgorsürengiin Sumyaabazar~~	Mongolian People's Party	Appointed as Mayor of Ulaanbaatar on 23 October 2020.
28th Ulaanbaatar Songino Khairkhan	Enkhbayaryn Batshugar	Mongolian People's Party	Took office on 21 October 2021.
28th Ulaanbaatar Songino Khairkhan	Purev-Ochiryn Anujin	Mongolian People's Party	
29th Ulaanbaatar Khan Uul	Ganibalyn Amartüvshin	Mongolian People's Party	
29th Ulaanbaatar Khan Uul	Davaajantsangiin Sarangerel	Mongolian People's Party	
29th Ulaanbaatar Khan Uul	Togmidyn Dorjkhand	Right Person Electorate Coalition	

== Government ==
Portrait	Name Constituency (Birth–Death)	Tenure			Party	Government
Portrait	Name Constituency (Birth–Death)	Took office	Left office	Duration	Party	Government
	Ukhnaagiin Khürelsükh 18th - Khentii (born 1968)	4 October 2017	27 January 2021	3 years, 116 days	Mongolian People's Party	Khürelsükh II
	Luvsannamsrain Oyun-Erdene 18th - Khentii (born 1980)	27 January 2021	Incumbent	5 years, 224 days	Mongolian People's Party	Oyun-Erdene I
