= Dambyn Batlut =

Mongolian politician

- Дамбын Батлут
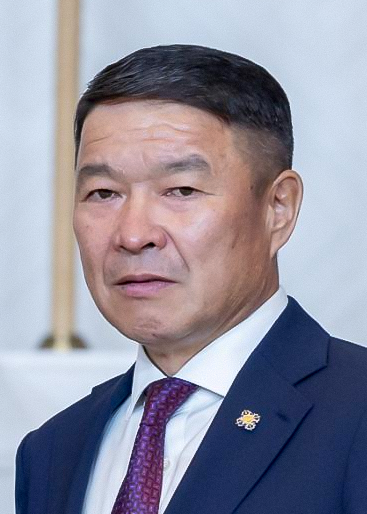
- Batlut in 2025

Minister of Defence
- Incumbent
- Assumed office 18 June 2025
- Prime Minister: Gombojavyn Zandanshatar; Nyam-Osoryn Uchral
- Preceded by: Sandagiin Byambatsogt

Member of the State Great Khural
- Incumbent
- Assumed office 30 June 2020
- Constituency: 4th, Bulgan, Khövsgöl, Orkhon Province (2024–present); 20th, Orkhon Province (2020–2024)

Personal details
- Born: 19 August 1974 (age 52) Khashaat, Arkhangai, Mongolia
- Party: Mongolian People's Party
- Children: 4 children
- Education: Mongolian University of Science and Technology; National Academy of Governance

Dambyn Batlut (Mongolian: Дамбын Батлут; born 19 August 1974) is a Mongolian politician who has been serving as the Minister of Defence since 2025. As member of the Mongolian People's Party, he has held numerous local positions in his home province, Orkhon Province. Batlut served as the provincial governor and mayor of Erdenet from 2016 to 2020. He was elected as member of the State Great Khural, the national parliament, from Orkhon in 2020 and 2024.

== Early life and education ==
Batlut was born in Khashaat district of Arkhangai Province on 19 August 1974. Batlut studied at the 10-year secondary school in Arkhangai in 1985. After moving to Erdenet, then third-largest city, he completed his secondary education at Secondary School No. 5 of Erdenet in 1992. Batlut began his career working as an assistant at the "Erdenet Carpet" Co., Ltd. from 1994 to 2000.

He went to the Sh.Otgonbileg School of Technology within the Mongolian University of Science and Technology in the capital, Ulaanbaatar, graduating as an electrical engineer in 2004. He later transitioned into the non-profit sector, serving as the executive director for World Vision in Mongolia from 2003 to 2006. In 2006, he entered public service as an officer in the Construction and Urban Development Department of the Governor's Office in Orkhon Province, established in 1994. In 2007, he obtained a degree in public administration from the National Academy of Governance.

== Political career ==
=== Local politics ===
From 2008 to 2012, he served as the Deputy Governor of Bayan-Öndör, while simultaneously beginning a long tenure as a Caucus Chairman of the Presidium of the Citizens' Representatives Khural of Orkhon, a position he held until 2020. Alongside his government duties, Batlut held several key leadership roles within the Mongolian People's Party (MPP). He served as the regional leader of the Social Democracy–Mongolian Youth Association from 2006 to 2013. Batlut held the party leadership of the MPP branch in Bayan-Öndör from 2010 to 2012 and later the MPP branch in Orkhon Province from 2013 to 2020. The latter position coincided with his term as Governor of Orkhon Province and Mayor of Erdenet, serving from 2016 to 2020.

=== Member of the State Great Khural ===
Batlut ascended to national politics in 2020 when he was elected as a member of the State Great Khural. He served as member of the Standing Committee on Human Development and Social Policy. He successfully won re-election from his seat during the 2024 election. On 18 June 2025, Batlut was appointed to the post, Minister of Defence, by prime minister Gombojavyn Zandanshatar, succeeding Sandagiin Byambatsogt who had been named Chief Cabinet Secretary. Batlut was reappointed on 4 April 2026, in the Cabinet of Nyam-Osoryn Uchral.

== Awards ==
- Medal "800th Anniversary for the Establishment of Great Mongol Empire" (2006)
- Medal "90th Anniversary of People's Revolution" (2011)
- Order of the Polar Star (2017)

== Personal life ==
Batlut is married with four children. He is fluent in Russian and English.
