= Sandagiin Byambatsogt =

Mongolian politician (born 1974)

- Сандагийн Бямбацогт
- Official portrait, 2026

Acting President of Mongolia
- Incumbent
- Assumed office 19 November 2026
- Prime Minister: Nyam-Osoryn Uchral
- Preceded by: Ukhnaagiin Khürelsükh

Chairman of the State Great Khural
- Incumbent
- Assumed office 3 April 2026
- Preceded by: Nyam-Osoryn Uchral
Ministerial offices
Chief Cabinet Secretary
In office 18 June 2025 – 4 April 2026
| Prime Minister | Gombojavyn Zandanshatar |
| Preceded by | Nyam-Osoryn Uchral |
| Succeeded by | Battömöriin Enkhbayar |
Minister of Defense
In office 10 July 2024 – 3 June 2025
| Prime Minister | Luvsannamsrain Oyun-Erdene |
| Preceded by | Gürsediin Saikhanbayar |
| Succeeded by | Dambyn Batlut |
Minister of Road and Transport
In office 30 August 2022 – 10 July 2024
| Prime Minister | Luvsannamsrain Oyun-Erdene |
| Preceded by | Luvsangiin Khaltar |
| Succeeded by | Borkhüügiin Delgersaikhan |
Minister of Justice and Internal Affairs
In office 23 July 2016 – 4 October 2017
| Prime Minister | Jargaltulgyn Erdenebat |
| Preceded by | Dambiin Dorligjav |
| Succeeded by | Tsendiin Nyamdorj |

Member of the State Great Khural
- Incumbent
- Assumed office July 2008
- Constituency: 2nd, Govi-Altai, Khovd, Uvs, Zavkhan Province (2024–present); 16th, Khovd Province (2012–2016); 35th, Khovd Province (2016–2020); 16th, Khovd Province (2012–2016); 16th, Khovd Province (2008–2012)

Personal details
- Born: 14 September 1974 (age 52) Jargalant, Khovd, Mongolia
- Party: Mongolian People's Party
- Children: 3 sons
- Education: University of Finance and Economics (BA); Maastricht University (MBA); National University of Mongolia (BA)

Sandagiin Byambatsogt (Mongolian: Сандагийн Бямбацогт; born 14 September 1974) is a Mongolian politician and public administration manager who has been the Chairman of the State Great Khural since 2026. He has served as a member of the State Great Khural since 2008, having been elected five times to the parliament. A member of the Mongolian People's Party (MPP), he has also served as Chief Cabinet Secretary from 2025 to 2026, Minister of Defense from 2024 to 2025, Minister of Road and Transport from 2022 to 2024, and Minister of Justice and Home Affairs from 2016 to 2017.

On 19 November 2026, incumbent President of Mongolia Ukhnaagiin Khürelsükh was relieved of his duties. Consequently, as chairman of the State Great Khural, Byambatsogt assumed the presidency as acting officeholder until a new president is elected within four months.

== Early life and career ==
Byambatsogt was born in Khovd City (also called Jargalant district), the provincial capital of Khovd Province, on 14 September 1974. He was born as the eldest with six siblings. At the age of 6, his father, Sandag, passed away due to health complications. Byambatsogt completed his secondary education at No.2 Secondary School in his hometown in 1992. Subsequently, he enrolled at the Military University (present-day National Defense University); though the exact information regarding his military service and time at the university remains unknown. In 1997, he pursued higher education in economics, earning a degree from the Finance and Economics Institute in 1999.

From 1998 to 2000, he was the Director General of "Hovdiin Urguu" Co. Ltd. He then became the Director of the "New Progress" company in 2000, a position he held until 2006. He furthered his studies at Maastricht University in the Netherlands, obtaining a master's degree in economics in 2005. His leadership at "New Progress" led to the formation of the "New Progress" Group, where he served as the Chair of the Board of Directors from 2006 to 2008 and later as its President in 2008. In 2014, he earned a Bachelor of Arts in Legal Studies from the School of Law at the National University of Mongolia.

== Political career ==
In 2008, Byambatsogt was elected to the State Great Khural, representing the Mongolian People's Revolutionary Party (MPRP) and the 16th constituency in Khovd Province. He was re-elected from Khovd in the 2012 parliamentary election. In 2013, he was elected as the leader of the MPP (renamed MPRP) minority caucus, guiding the legislative agenda of his party. He served in this position until 2016.

Byambatsogt secured another term as lawmaker in the 2016 parliamentary elections, during which the MPP secured 72 seats, enough for forming an all-MPP cabinet. In 2016, he was appointed Minister of Justice and Internal Affairs by Prime Minister Jargaltulgyn Erdenebat. His ministerial tenure was cut short when Erdenebat was dismissed by parliament in October 2017.

Byambatsogt with US Secretary of State Antony Blinken after signing the Open Skies Agreement in Washington, D.C., 4 August 2023

Byambatsogt, as defence minister, during the opening ceremony of the 2024 Khaan Quest, 27 July 2024

In 2018, he was made Chairman of the Standing Committee on State Structure, a position he held until 2020, when he was re-elected. From 2022 to 2024, he served as the Minister of Road and Transport Development of the cabinet led by Luvsannamsrain Oyun-Erdene. During his tenure, he signed the Open Skies Agreement with the United States, aimed at improving air connectivity between the two nations, on 4 August 2023.

In July 2024, he secured his fifth consecutive legislative term from Khovd and was subsequently made Minister of Defense by re-appointed Prime Minister Oyun-Erdene. Following the collapse of the second Oyun-Erdene cabinet, Byambatsogt continued to serve as government minister when he was renominated as Chief Cabinet Secretary by succeeding Prime Minister Gombojavyn Zandanshatar on 17 June 2025.

=== Chairman of the State Great Khural (2026–present) ===
He was appointed (84–20) as Chairman of the State Great Khural by the legislature on 3 April 2026 following the resignation of Zandanshatar and nomination of MPP chair and outgoing speaker Nyam-Osoryn Uchral as premier. The "Open Parliament" initiative (Нээлттэй парламент), an online transparency reform and modernization of the parliamentary electronic platform, was commenced during Byambatsogt's tenure. The policy, aiming to improve public access to information, expanded the transparency of all lawmaker's attendence, legislative reports, and bill proposals.

On 19 November 2026, Byambatsogt assumed the presidential office as speaker following the voluntary resignation of sitting President Ukhnaagiin Khürelsükh. He is serving as the acting president until the next presidential elections are held by March 2027.

Prior to Khürelsükh's resignation, the media speculated that Byambatsogt is one of the potential presidential candidates of the MPP. However, on 20 November 2026, he told the media that he will not run in the elections and remains committed to his stance.

== Awards and recognition ==
Byambatsogt has been recognized with numerous state honors for his contributions to Mongolia:

- Medal "80th Anniversary of People’s Revolution" (2001)
- Award "Leading Personnel in Trade and Industrial Sector" (2005)
- Medal "800th Anniversary of the Establishment of Great Mongol Empire" (2006)
- Order of the Polar Star (2008)
- Order of the Red Banner of Labor (2014)

== Personal life ==
Byambatsogt is married with three children, the youngest two being twins. He is fluent in English.

=== Sports ===
Byambatsogt has been an avid fan and player of volleyball since his childhood. With a first-class qualification in volleyball, he has promoted the sport in his home province during his legislative tenure. In 2014, he became the best male volleyball player during the annual "State Great Khural Cup," where public officials from various state institutions compete in. He is a founder and supporter of the "Altain Bars" Volleyball Club, a volleyball team based in Khovd.

Alongside volleyball, he is also an accomplished mountaineer. He has climbed several peaks in western Mongolia, notably Altai Tavan Bogd, Tsambagarav, and Mönkhkhairkhan Mountain.

Political offices
| Preceded by Ukhnaagiin Khürelsükh | Acting President of Mongolia; 2026–present | Incumbent |
| Preceded by Nyam-Osoryn Uchral | Chairman of the State Great Khural; 2026–present | Incumbent |
