= Gürsediin Saikhanbayar =

Mongolian Minister of Defense

Lieutenant general Gürsediin Saikhanbayar
- Гүрсэдийн Сайханбаяр
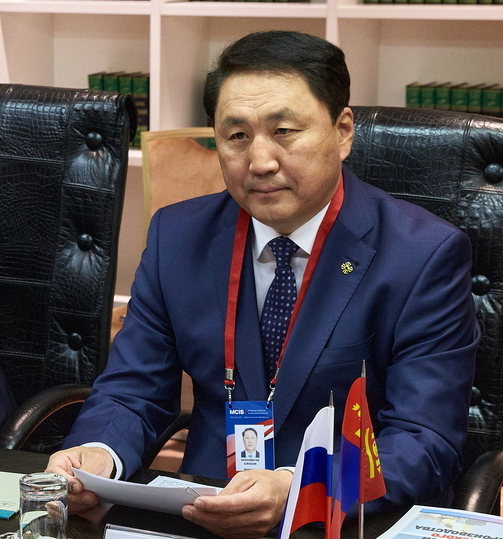
- Saikhanbayar in 2021

Minister of Defense
- In office 8 July 2020 – 10 July 2024
- Preceded by: Nyamaagiin Enkhbold
- Succeeded by: Sandagiin Byambatsogt

Personal details
- Born: July 4, 1968 (age 57) Ulaanbaatar, Mongolian People's Republic
- Party: Mongolian People's Party
- Children: 2
- Occupation: Politician, Public Administration Manager, Military Officer
- Awards: Honorary Medal of Military Service (1999); Order of Military Merit; Medal of the 800th anniversary of the founding of the Great Mongolia (2006); Order of the Red Banner of Military Merit (2015)

Gürsediin Saikhanbayar (Mongolian: Гүрсэдийн Сайханбаяр) is a Mongolian politician, public administration manager and military officer who was the Minister of Defense of Mongolia from 2020 to 2024. He is the 36th minister since the establishment of the ministry in 1911 and the 17th since the end of communism in 1990. He holds the rank of Lieutenant general, awarded to him in 2022.

== Early life and career ==
He was born on July 4, 1968, in Ulaanbaatar. He was raised in a military family. His father Gursed was born in Arkhangai province and he taught in primary and secondary schools in Bayankhongor Province before enlisting Mongolian Army in 1961. His father retired from the military as in rank of Lieutenant Colonel and his mother served as an accountant in military units, and she is retired now. In 1975, he enrolled in a 10-year secondary school located in the capital city. From 1985 to 1989, he studied at the Political Science Department of the Military University.

Around the time of the Mongolian Revolution of 1990, he was a Political Deputy in the 121st Unit of the Mongolian People's Army. Up until 1994, he worked as an officer of information and culture in the 318th Unit, after which he served in the Training and Education Department of the General Staff. From 1997 to 2000 Head of the Information, Culture and Education Department of the General Staff. In 2001, he graduated from the PLA National Defence University of the People's Republic of China. From 2005 to 2012, he served as Head of the Public Administration Directorate, Ministry of Defense. After which he enrolled in the Military Academy of the General Staff of the Armed Forces of Russia, where he graduated from in 2014. From July 2014 to 2020, he was the head of the Strategic Policy and Planning Directorate of the Ministry of Defense. During this period, he became linked to the legal reform of the defense sector. He was appointed as a member of the Government of Mongolia on 8 July 2020, becoming Minister of Defense in the cabinet of Prime Minister Ukhnaagiin Khürelsükh by his order. He was reappointed the following year by Luvsannamsrain Oyun-Erdene. He has been the first non-civilian in over a decade to hold this post.

== Personal life ==
He is married and has children. Aside from speaking his native language, he is fluent in Russian.

== Awards ==
- Honorary Medal of Military Service (1999)
- Order of Military Merit
- Medal of the 800th anniversary of the founding of the Great Mongolia (2006)
- Order of the Red Banner of Military Merit (2015)
