= National Defense University (Mongolia) =

Military university in Ulaanbaatar, Mongolia

Damdin Sükhbaatar National Defense University
- Дамдин Сүхбаатарын Батлан хамгаалахын их сургууль
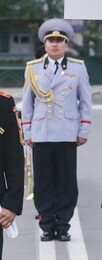
- A cadet of the NDU
- Other name: MNDU (abbreviation)
- Former name: Defense University of Mongolia
- Type: military academy
- Established: 1921; 105 years ago
- Founder: Government of Mongolia
- Affiliations: Armed Forces of Mongolia
- Director of the NDU: Brigadier General Purevsuren Jargalan
- Location: 16th Street, Bayanzurkh District, Ulaanbaatar
- Language: Mongolian (the English and Russian language are also used as inter-ethnic languages.)
- Colors: Grey
- Website: "Official Website" (in Mongolian).

The National Defense University (MNDU) is an accredited Mongolian military university located in Ulaanbaatar, Mongolia. On March 24, 1921, the Provisional People’s Government and the Central Committee of the Party held a joint meeting to address military organization issues. During this meeting, they adopted a resolution stating: “...a military school should be established to train intelligent Mongolian soldiers, educate them in military studies, and prepare them to become commanding officers.” This resolution marked the official decision to establish the first military school, and on October 15, 1921, the school commenced its first classes.The NDU prepares officers and NCOs alike to have grounded leadership skills, physical and moral strength and a high military and civilian education.

== History ==
It was established initially as the Commanders School of the Mongolian People's Army in September 1921 at the initiative of Damdin Sükhbaatar, who was a founding member of the Mongolian People's Party (MPP). The first leaders of the school was Soviet expert P. Mhalpinein and director L. Dzuzav, the Mongolian director. The NDU has since operated under the follow names:

- Commanders School of the Mongolian People's Army (September 1921 – September 1923)
- All-Arms General Military School (September 1923 – May 1932)
- General Military Higher School (May 1932 – June 1967)
- Combined Military Higher School (1967–1991)
- Military University (1990–1999)
- Defense University of Mongolia (1999–2017)
- National Defense University (since 2017)

In 1994, the NDU maintained a border protection faculty, which would later be expanded to establish the Border Troops Institute and what would later become the Law Enforcement University of Mongolia. Since 1998, the NDU's international relations have been intensified, with some cadets at the university studying and/or training at military educational institutions such as the Military University of the Russian Defense Ministry, the United States Army War College, and the Turkish Military Academy.

== Structure ==
The NDU is composed of the following education institutions:

- Defense Management Academy
- Defense Research Institute
- Academic Education Institute
- Military Institute
- Military Music College
- Department of Military Communications and Cyber Security
- NCO College

There are also 16 academic/military branch departments managed by the NDU around the country.

== Affiliated military lyceum ==
The "Temujin Urlug" Secondary School (Mongolian: Тэмүжин Өрлөг бүрэн дунд сургууль) is a military lyceum of the armed forces. The school was established in 2010 and is the successor to the Sukhbaatar Officer's School, established on October 1, 1943. It currently has 25 teachers and 202 students, and prepares future personnel for the Armed Forces. The school works with the Suvorov Military School in Yekaterinburg and Omsk in Russia, and the Military High School of Bulgaria.

At the invitation of the Mayor of Angarsk, Irkutsk Oblast, students of the school marched in a Victory Day military ceremony in the city.

== Honors ==
The following is a list of material honors the NDU has:

- Honorific title of National Defense University named after Damdin Sükhbaatar
- Recipient of the Order of Sukhbaatar
- Recipient of the Red Banner Order of Combat Merit

Other than the material honors it has been given, it also has many other honors that are bestowed upon it. Every July, the NDU provides the armed forces standard color guard and the corps of drums in the Mongolian State Flag Day military parade on Sükhbaatar Square. In September 2015, cadets of the NDU took part in the China Victory Day Parade on Beijing's Chang'an Avenue. The NDU holds its graduation ceremony in the presence of the President of Mongolia.

== Directors of NDU ==
| No. | Rank, Name | Term of office | |
|---|---|---|---|
| No. | Rank, Name | Took office | Left office |
| 1 | Major General, Boldbaatar, Zagdsuren | 2009 | 2012 |
| 2 Army General Dorjzovd | Major General, Choijamts, Yadmaa | 2012 | 2017 |
| 3 | Brigadier General, Jargalan, Purevsuren | 2017 | 2024 |

== Alumni ==
- Dashdemberal Bat-Erdene, Minister of Defense of Mongolia from 2012 to 2014.
- Mishigiin Sonompil, Minister for Defense from January 2006 to December 2007.
- Dulamsürengiin Davaa, Chief of General Staff under Presidents Tsakhiagiin Elbegdorj and Khaltmaagiin Battulga.
- Ukhnaagiin Khürelsükh, Prime Minister and 6th President of Mongolia.
- Gürsediin Saikhanbayar, Minister of Defense of Mongolia since 2020.
- Badmaanyambuugiin Bat-Erdene, a Mongolian politician and athlete.
- Batchimeg Migeddorj, former national security advisor and member of parliament.
