= Jamyangiin Mönkhbat =

Mongolian politician

- Жамъяангийн Мөнхбат
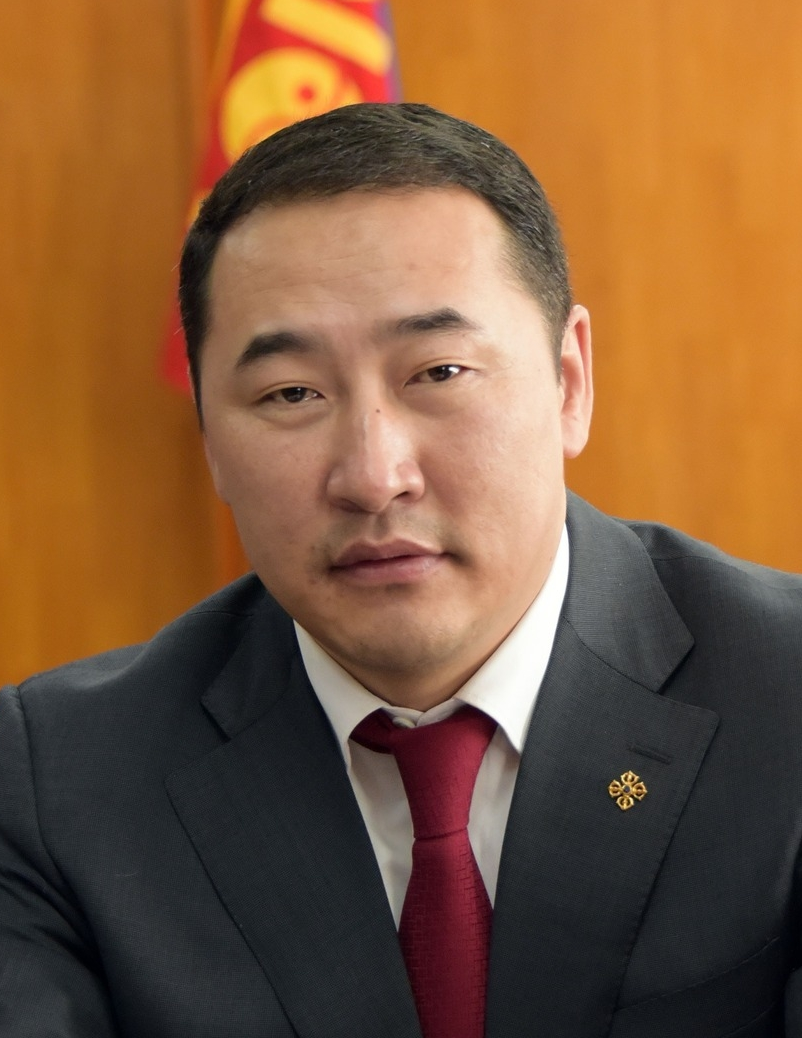
- Mönkhbat in 2023

Secretary General of the Mongolian People's Party
- In office November 2013 – December 2016
- Party Chairman: Miyeegombyn Enkhbold
- Succeeded by: Dashzegviin Amarbayasgalan

Member of the State Great Khural
- In office 5 July 2016 – 23 March 2023
- Constituency: 1st, Arkhangai Province (2016–2023)

Personal details
- Born: 12 February 1979 (age 47) Arkhangai, Mongolia
- Party: Mongolian People's Party (until 2023)
- Education: National University of Mongolia

Jamyangiin Mönkhbat (Mongolian: Жамъяангийн Мөнхбат; born 12 February 1979) is a Mongolian politician who served as a member of the State Great Khural from 2016 until his resignation in 2023.

== Career ==
He graduated from the National University of Mongolia in 2001. His career began as an Organizer at the office of the Speaker of the Parliament. Later, he worked as an assistant to the Speaker of the Parliament. In 2005, he became an assistant to the Office of the President. Then, he was appointed as the Secretary General of the Social Democracy Mongolian Youth Union (2005–2007), President of Mongolian Youth Development Association (2008–2010), Deputy Head of standing committee on political policy, Board of Mongolian People’s Party (2010–2011), Chief Editor of Mongolyn Ünen daily newspaper (2011–2012) and Secretary of Mongolian People’s Party and Vice President of Social Democracy Mongolian Youth Union (2012 to 2013). He was elected as Secretary General of the Mongolian People’s Party in 2013.

== Sources ==
- https://web.archive.org/web/20141129034133/http://nam.mn/member/28
