= Dashdembereliin Bat-Erdene =

Mongolian politician

Dashdemberal Bat-Erdene Дашдэмбэрэлийн Бат-Эрдэнэ
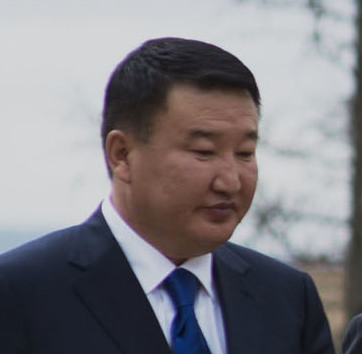
- Bat-Erdene at the Ministry of Defence in Ulan-Bator

Minister of Defense
- In office 2012–2014
- President: Tsakhiagiin Elbegdorj
- Preceded by: Luvsanvandan Bold
- Succeeded by: Tserendash Tsolmon

Personal details
- Born: December 9, 1963 (age 62) Dalanzadgad, Ömnögovi Province, Mongolian People's Republic
- Party: Democratic Party
- Children: 3

Dashdemberal Bat-Erdene (Mongolian: Дашдэмбэрэлийн Бат-Эрдэнэ; born 1963) is a Mongolian politician who was the Minister of Defense of Mongolia from 2012 to 2014.

== Early life and education ==
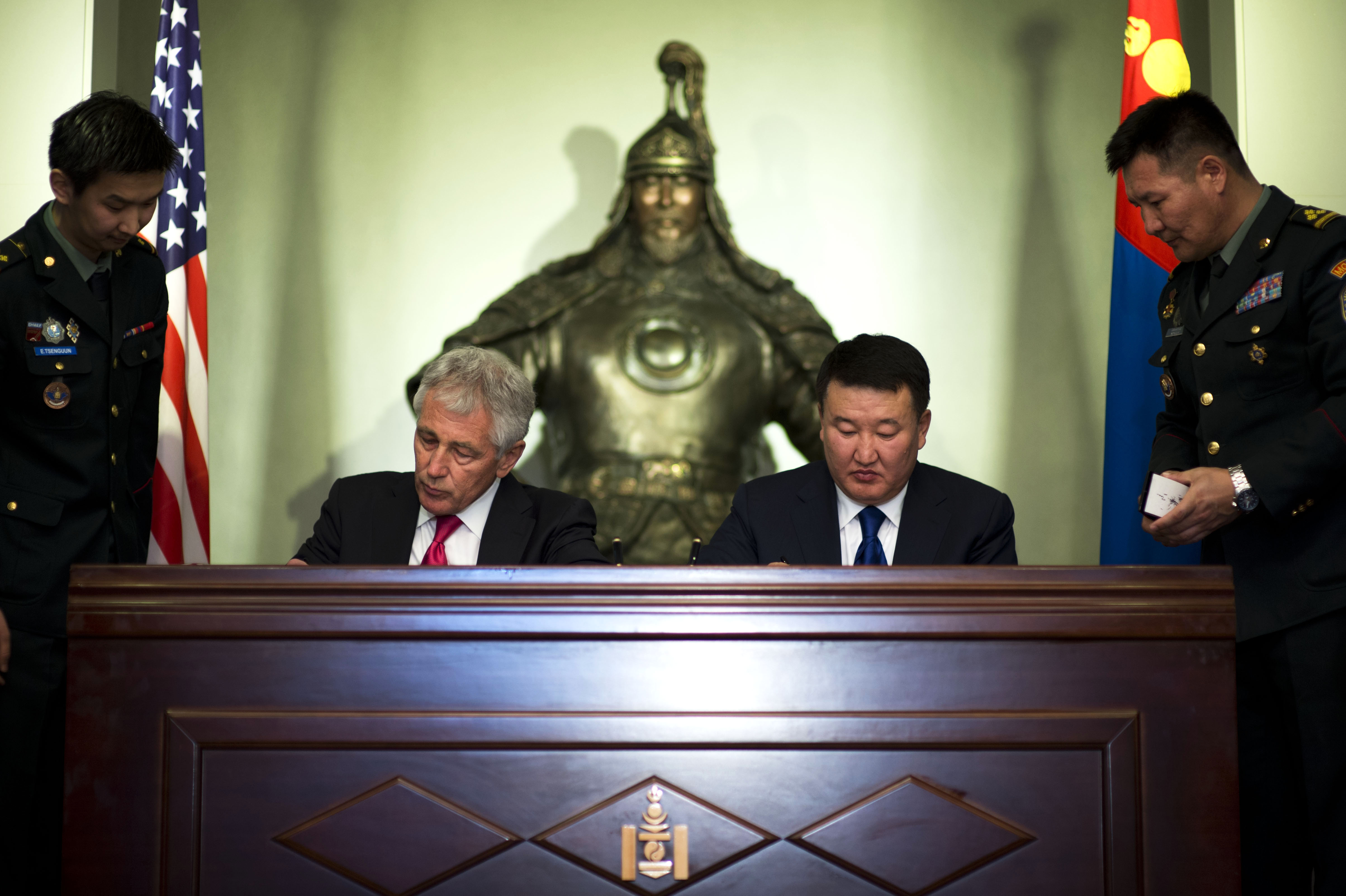
Chuck Hagel with Dashdemberal Bat-Erdene at Government Palace in April 2014.

He was born in the winter of 1963 in the city of Dalanzadgad in the Ömnögovi Province. From 1971-1981, he received his secondary education at the Ömnögovi Secondary School, located in his birth province. In 1990, he became the President of the Ajnai Corporation. For 12 years after 1992, he served as a methodologist and teacher at the National Defense University before entering politics. From 2004-2008, he was a member of the State Great Khural, the Mongolian legislature. In 2012, President Tsakhiagiin Elbegdorj appointed him to the post of Minister of Defence. In April 2014, towards the end of his term, he presented visiting U.S. Secretary of Defence Chuck Hagel with a traditional Mongolian horse.

Since 1995, he has been President of the Association of Mongolian Oral Surgeons. He is also the President of the Mongolian Boxing Federation. He is currently married with three children. Aside from his native Mongolian language, he is also fluent English and Russian. He is a Doctor of Philosophy. He is known widely as being one the richest people to ever serve in the legislature, owning three apartments in the capital and spending. He also owns two media organizations, Undesny Medee Newspaper and Ekh Oron Television.

== Education ==
- Ural Federal University (1981-1987)
- Supervisory Course at the Russian Academy of Sciences (1991-1992)
- Economics University of Colorado (1993-1994)
