= Purev-Ochiryn Anujin =

Mongolian politician (born 1977)

- Пүрэв-Очирын Анужин

Member of State Great Khural
- In office 30 June 2020 – 2 July 2024

Personal details
- Born: 1977 (age 48–49) Ulaanbaatar, Mongolia
- Party: Mongolian People's Party
- Education: National University of Mongolia; Sōka University

Purev-Ochiryn Anujin (Mongolian: Пүрэв-Очирын Анужин; born 1977) is a Mongolian politician of the Mongolian People's Party, who was a member of the State Great Khural from 2020 to 2024 and served as chairwoman of the Standing Committee on Social Policy from 2022 to 2024.

== Early life and education ==
Purev-Ochiryn Anujin attended Secondary School No. 12 in Ulaanbaatar from 1984 to 1994 and then began studying international relations at the Foreign Service School of the National University of Mongolia, which she graduated with a Bachelor of Arts (B.A. International Relations) in 2000. Previously, in 1999, she completed a year of study abroad at the Foreign Language Institute in Tokyo. She completed postgraduate studies in international law at Sōka University in Hachiōji in 2004 with a Master of Arts (M.A. International Law).

== Professional career ==
Anujin then stayed in Japan and was a legal assistant at the security company Safety Technology Co Ltd from 2004 to 2010 before working as a journalist after returning to Mongolia. In 2010 she was the initiator and producer of the project “100 Important Mongols” (Монгол тулгатны 100 эрхэм) and was subsequently managing director of "Mongolkino Pictures” LLC", a film and television production company, between 2011 and 2020, with which she produced projects such as "100 Important Topics" (100 чухал сэдэв) 2011, "MonGal Chronicles" (МонГал товчоон) 2016 and "70/76" 2019.

== Political career ==
In the 2020 parliamentary election, Anujin became a member of the State Great Khural for the first time in the constituency No. 28 Ulaanbaatar Songino Khairkhan for the Mongolian People's Party, of which she has been a member since 2009. From 2022, she was Chairwoman of the Standing Committee for Social Policy of the State Great Khural. She was also a member of the Standing Committees on Security and Foreign Policy and on Education, Culture, Science and Sport.
