= 1993 Mongolian presidential election =

- 6 June 1993
- Registered: 1,106,403
- Turnout: 92.73%
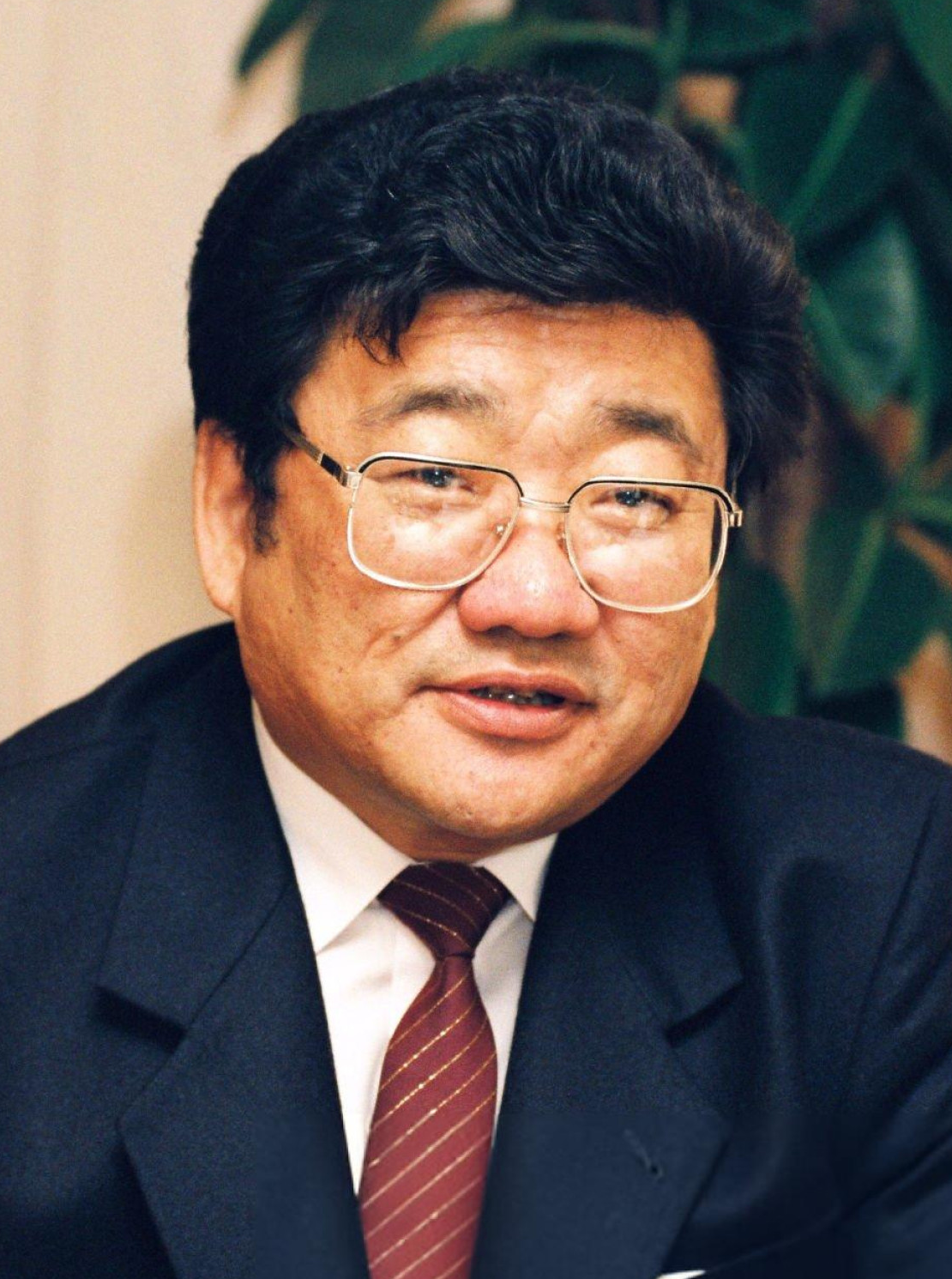

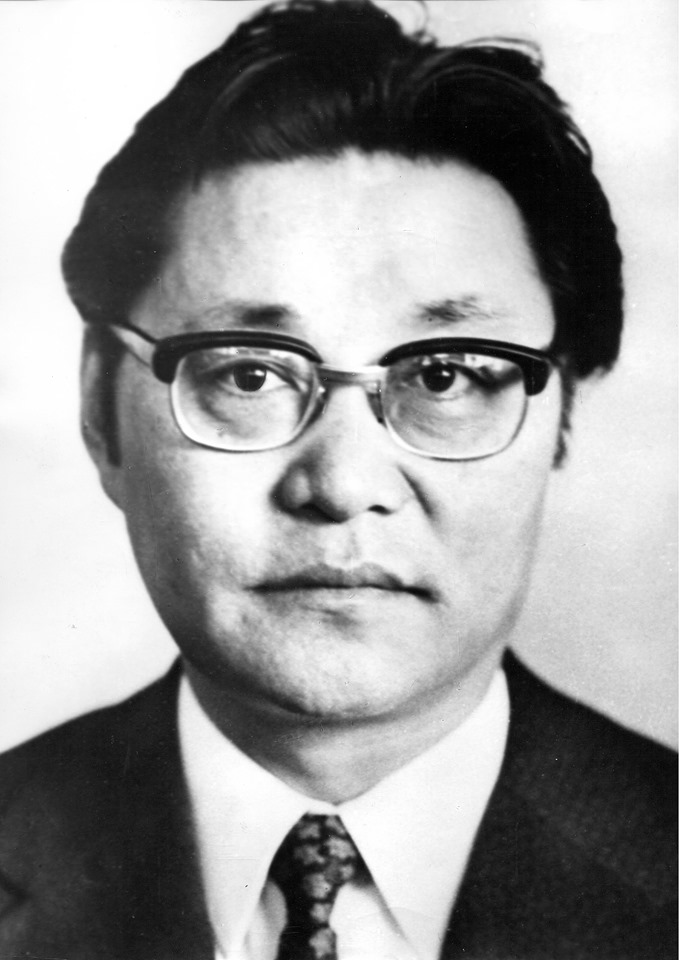
Nominee	Punsalmaagiin Ochirbat	Lodongiin Tüdev
Party	MSDP–MNDP	MPRP
Popular vote	592,836	397,057
Percentage	57.78%	38.70%
- Results by province
President before election
Punsalmaagiin Ochirbat
MPRP
Elected President
Punsalmaagiin Ochirbat
MSDP–MNDP

Presidential elections were held in Mongolia on 6 June 1993, the first time a head of state had been democratically elected in a competitive election. The two candidates were incumbent president Punsalmaagiin Ochirbat and Lodongiin Tüdev, a renowned writer, editor and prominent political figure. Ochirbat, who was previously elected president of the Mongolian People's Republic by the People's Grand Khural in the aftermath of the 1990 revolution, was nominated as a candidate by the opposition coalition between the Mongolian Social Democratic Party (MSDP) and the Mongolian National Democratic Party (MNDP). Tüdev was nominated as a candidate by the ruling Mongolian People's Revolutionary Party (MPRP).

The result was a victory for Ochirbat, who received 57.8% of the vote. Voter turnout was 93%, which remains the highest turnout for a presidential election and the only time the turnout for a presidential election was over 90%. It was the MPRP's first electoral loss since the adoption of the 1992 Constitution.

== Electoral system ==
Presidential electoral law was ratified by the legislature on 15 February 1993, which took effect on 1 March 1993.

According to the law, the election was to be held using the two-round system. If no candidate had received a majority of the vote (including invalid ballots) in the first round, a second round would be held. Only parties with seats in the State Great Khural were allowed to nominate candidates. Parties in a coalition were also allowed to nominate a joint candidate.

Citizens aged at least 18 and residing within the borders of Mongolia were eligible to vote via secret ballot. The organization of the elections were tasked to General Election Commission (GEC), an electoral commission responsible to the State Great Khural, and local polling stations.

== Background ==
=== Fall of communism ===
Following the 1990 pro-democracy movement, the General Secretary of the Mongolian People's Revolutionary Party, Jambyn Batmönkh, and other politburo leaders announced their resignation in March 1990, paving the way for democratic change in Mongolia.

On 21 March 1990, during the 8th Extraordinary People's Grand Khural session, the following constitutional provision: "The guiding force of the Mongolian People's Republic is the Mongolian People's Revolutionary Party, which uses the all-conquering Marxist-Leninist theory in its operations." was removed from the Constitution of the MPR; officially ending 70 years of one-party rule. Head of state Jambyn Batmönkh and premier Dumaagiin Sodnom were succeeded by Punsalmaagiin Ochirbat and Sharavyn Gungaadorj during the session.

=== Transition to democracy ===
The first multi-party parliamentary elections were held in July 1990 for the People's Grand Khural and the State Little Khural with a high turnout of 98%. The MPRP won both elections to both houses, while opposition parties made modest gains. Punsalmaagiin Ochirbat was re-elected as a deputy to the People's Grand Khural and was subsequently appointed to the newly created position of President of the Mongolian People's Republic in September 1990.

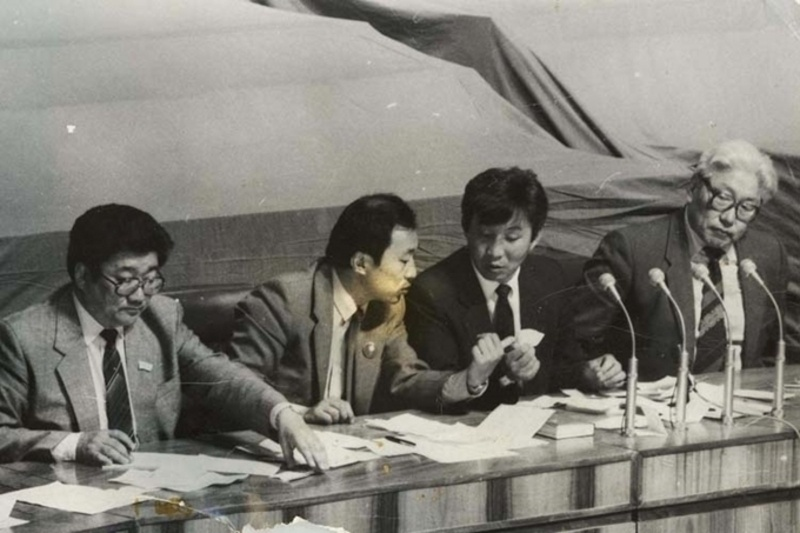
President Punsalmaagiin Ochirbat (leftmost) and deputy premier Dashiin Byambasüren (rightmost) meeting with opposition leaders, circa June 1990

In January 1992, a new constitution was ratified, renaming the country to Mongolia and changing the presidential title to "President of Mongolia and Commander-in-Chief of the Armed Forces." After the ratification, parliamentary elections for the unicameral legislature, the State Great Khural, were held on 28 June 1992. The MPRP once again won a supermajority, securing 70 out of the total 76 seats with 57% of the vote. This was largely attributed to the party's adoption of multiparty governance and its support for a market economy. The opposition alliance between the Mongolian National Progress Party (MNPP), the Mongolian Democratic Party (MDP), and the Mongolian United Party (MUP) won four seats with 17% of the vote. The Mongolian Social Democratic Party, supported by the German SPD, won one seat with 10% of the vote. The opposition MDP, MNPP, MUP, and Mongolian Renaissance Party merged in late 1992 to form the Mongolian National Democratic Party (MNDP). The MNDP, with its four parliamentary seats, became the primary opposition to the MPRP and second largest parliamentary party.

Local elections were held in October of the same year. The ruling MPRP won all 18 governorships of the country's provinces and almost 90% of all sum legislature seats.

== Candidates ==
According to the electoral law, parties with representation in the State Great Khural were allowed to nominate candidates for the presidential election. Three political parties, the MPRP, the MNDP, and the MSDP, were eligible to compete in the election.

During a party conference in April 1993, inaugural president Ochirbat was rejected as the MPRP's pick for the presidential candidate, with the party instead selecting Lodongiin Tüdev, a well-known writer, editor, and intellectual figure. Both figures belonged to different factions within the party. Tüdev was considered as more orthodox party member than Ochirbat.

In response to the decision, the MNDP and MSDP formed a coalition and nominated Ochirbat as their joint candidate for the presidential election.

Names	Born	Last position	Party
Lodongiin Tüdev	9 February 1935 (58); Naran, Govi-Altai, Mongolia	Editor of Mongolyn Ünen (1984–1996)	Mongolian People's Revolutionary Party
Punsalmaagiin Ochirbat	23 January 1942 (51); Tüdevtei, Zavkhan, Mongolia	President of the Mongolian People's Republic (1990–1992)	MSDP–MNDP

== Opinion polls ==
Polling firm	Fieldwork date	Sample size	Ochirbat MNDP–MSDP	Tüdev MPRP	Undecided
MPRP Research, Training and Information Centre	April 17	–	56.6	30.2	13.2
Policy	May 1-7	–	60.0	38.9	1.1
MPRP Research, Training and Information Centre	May 7	–	52.5	44.3	3.2
MPRP Research, Training and Information Centre	May 27	–	46.0	51.0	3.0

== Results ==
Voting began at 7:00 and ended at 22:00 on Sunday, 6 June 1993. Ochirbat received 57.8% of the vote and was re-elected as president at the age of 51, becoming the first non-MPRP president to be elected.

Candidate	Party	Votes	%
Punsalmaagiin Ochirbat	MSDP–MNDP	592,836	57.78
Lodongiin Tüdev	Mongolian People's Revolutionary Party	397,057	38.70
Invalid votes		36,077	3.52
Total		1,025,970	100.00
Total votes		1,025,970	–
Registered voters/turnout		1,106,403	92.73
Source: General Election Commission

Vote share
Ochirbat	57.78%
Tüdev	38.70%
Invalid votes	3.52%

=== Results by area ===
Subdivision	Punsalmaagiin Ochirbat MNDP–MSDP		Lodongiin Tüdev MPRP	
Subdivision	Votes	%	Votes	%
Aimags of Mongolia
Arkhangai	29,646	67.83%	14,060	32.17%
Bayan-Ölgii	17,361	46.52%	18,331	49.12%
Bayankhongor	24,193	64.27%	12,424	33.01%
Bulgan	17,785	62.05%	9,889	34.50%
Govi-Altai	6,094	19.67%	24,095	77.76%
Dornogovi	14,724	58.09%	9,821	38.75%
Dornod	23,846	66.43%	10,813	30.12%
Dundgovi	11,674	49.47%	11,284	47.82%
Zavkhan	35,987	78.73%	8,524	18.65%
Övörkhangai	30,080	60.36%	18,034	36.19%
Ömnögovi	12,381	57.32%	8,777	40.63%
Sükhbaatar	16,008	60.88%	9,183	34.92%
Selenge	26,374	63.83%	13,422	32.48%
Töv	28,171	54.73%	21,520	41.81%
Uvs	10,094	24.32	29,202	70.36%
Khovd	16,943	45.44%	19,053	51.09%
Khövsgöl	33,253	60.77%	18,761	34.29%
Khentii	22,787	67.25%	10,036	29.62%
Cities of Mongolia
Darkhan	23,802	63.36%	12,331	32.82%
Erdenet	19,082	72.74%	6,425	24.49%
Choir	3,365	66.07%	1,524	29.92%
Ulaanbaatar	169,186	58.57%	109,548	37.92%
Total	592,836	57.78%	397,057	38.70%
