= Mongolian Revolution of 1990 =

Peaceful protests for democracy in Mongolia

- Part of the revolutions of 1989
- Hunger strikers near the Government Palace in Ulaanbaatar, 1990
- Date: 10 December 1989 – 9 March 1990 (2 months, 3 weeks and 6 days)
- Location: Mongolia
- Caused by: Authoritarianism; Political repression; Economic stagnation; 1989 revolutions across the Eastern Bloc
- Goals: Resignation of the Politburo; Democratization; Free multi-party elections; Civil rights; Economic reforms
- Methods: Civil disobedience; Demonstrations; Hunger strike; Sit-in; Strike actions
- Result: Transition to a multi-party system; End of the Soviet influence in Mongolia; Resignation of the Politburo; Multi-party elections in July 1990; Large-scale privatization of state-owned industries starting in 1991; Adoption of a new constitution on 12 February 1992; Dissolution of the Mongolian People's Republic

Parties
Mongolian opposition; Mongolian Democratic Union; Democratic Socialist Movement; New Progressive Union; Mongolian Students' Union	Government of the Mongolian People's Republic; Ministry of Public Security; Internal Troops; Preventive Militia; Mongolian People's Revolutionary Party

Lead figures
Sanjaasürengiin Zorig; Erdeniin Bat-Üül; Davaadorjiin Ganbold; Tsakhiagiin Elbegdorj; Bat-Erdeniin Batbayar	Jambyn Batmönkh; Dumaagiin Sodnom; Sharavyn Gungaadorj

The Mongolian Revolution of 1990, known in Mongolia as the 1990 Democratic Revolution, (Note: Mongolian: 1990 оны ардчилсан хувьсгал, romanized: 1990 ony ardchilsan khuvisgal) was a peaceful democratic revolution that led to the country's transition to a multi-party system. It was inspired by the economic reforms of the Soviet Union in the late 1980s and was one of the many revolutions of 1989. It was led mostly by young demonstrators who rallied at Sükhbaatar Square, in the capital city, Ulaanbaatar. One of the most critical groups that pushed for change was the Mongolian Democratic Union (MDU). The main organisers of the demonstrations included Sanjaasürengiin Zorig, Erdeniin Bat-Üül, Davaadorjiin Ganbold, Tsakhiagiin Elbegdorj, and Bat-Erdeniin Batbayar. The revolution came to an end on 9 March 1990, when the entirety of the politburo of the Mongolian People's Revolutionary Party (MPRP) headed by Jambyn Batmönkh announced their resignation.

Although one-party rule in Mongolia officially ended with the adoption of a new constitution on 12 February 1992, the MPRP remained in power for nearly half a decade until it was voted out in favour of the opposition Democratic Union Coalition in the 1996 parliamentary election. However, the country had already begun transitioning to a market economy by 1991, with the creation of the stock market and the Government Privatization Committee. Some sources state that the economy was transitioning to a free market economy.

== Etymology ==
In then contemporary Mongolia, the events were commonly known as the Democratic Movement (Ардчилсан хөдөлгөөн), which remained in widespread use until the murder of Sanjaasürengiin Zorig, the forefront leader of the movement, in October 1998. Following his death, the now commonly used term, the Democratic Revolution, was first adopted by mainstream Mongolian media on 3 October 1998. In modern Mongolian historiography, the events are also referred to as the Revolution of the White Horse Year (Цагаан морин жилийн хувьсгал), marking the year 1990 as the year of the White Horse in the traditional Mongolian calendar.

== Background ==
Mongolia was previously a vassal state to the Qing dynasty. Starting with the pro-independence movements in 1911 against the colonisation policy of the late Qing dynasty, the country claimed its independence in 1921 with the help of the Soviet Russia, after White Russian and Chinese forces had been expelled. However, the country was highly influenced by the Soviet Union, and would eventually become a communist state in 1924. The Mongolian People's Party, that played a crucial role in achieving independence from the Republic of China and White Russians, would be renamed to the Mongolian People's Revolutionary Party (MPRP) due to pressure from the Soviet Union and the Comintern.

=== One-party state ===
Over the following decades, Mongolia would become highly aligned with the Soviet Union and considered its "satellite state", which was preferable to the alternative of China, both before and after 1949. Various extreme measures were taken to establish the Mongolian communist state including the persecution and purges of political leaders, lamas, and intellectuals. The massive transformations in the country included a complete ban of religious practices and the destruction of 700 monasteries, but also the construction of Mongolia's largest cities, the establishment of major industries, and the education of the masses. The Mongolian People's Republic (MPR) was led by Marshal Khorloogiin Choibalsan from 1939 to 1952, followed by Yumjaagiin Tsedenbal who served as the leader of the state from 1952 to 1984, both of whom were regarded to be highly agreeable with the Soviet Union's increasing involvement in Mongolia.

=== 1980s reforms ===
After the ousting of Tsedenbal in 1984, inspired by the reforms of Mikhail Gorbachev, the new leadership under Jambyn Batmönkh implemented economic reforms and restructuring but failed to appeal to those who, in late 1989, wanted broader political and societal changes. Concepts such as glasnost, freedom of speech, and economic liberties that the intellectuals were exposed to abroad inspired the initial discussions that would lead to the revolution.

Beginning in December 1988, the ruling party's newsletter, Ünen (lit."Truth"), began publishing a new column called "Workers' Letters," which criticized the Politburo and party leaders for the first time. Also in December 1988, a youth underground organization called "New Generation" (Шинэ үе) was established by young dissidents: Erdeniin Bat-Üül, the son of well-known author Sengiin Erdene; Sosorbaramyn Tsogtsaikhan, lead singer of Honh (Хонх, lit.'Bell') band; and Sukhbaataryn Amarsanaa, a journalist.

On 4 February 1989 a Soviet-Chinese agreement was signed to reduce the number of troops on the border. Later, on 15 May 1989, Soviet leadership under Gorbachev announced a partial and then a complete withdrawal of the 39th Army, stationed in Mongolia since 1967.

== Chronology ==
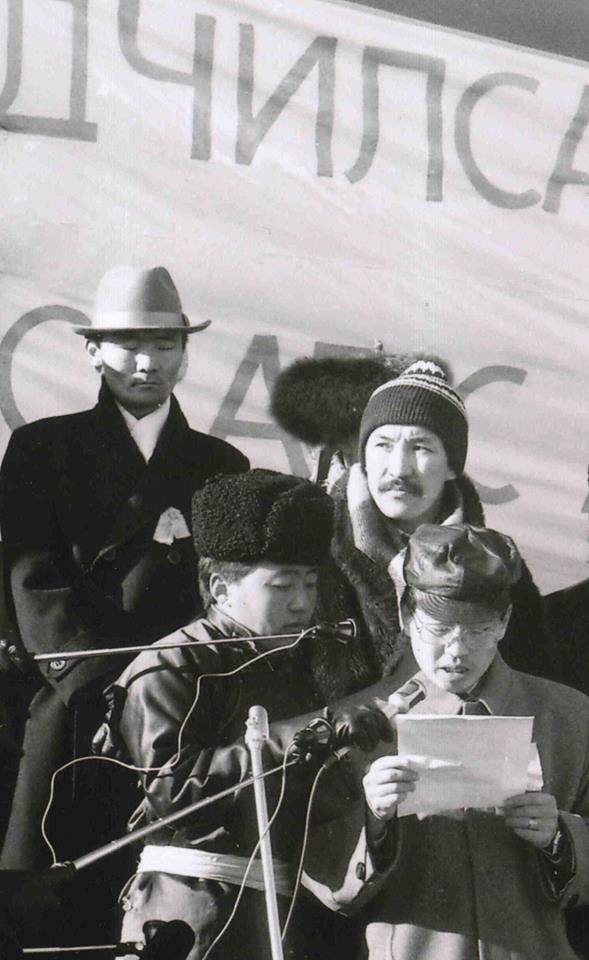
The first public demonstrations in Sükhbaatar Square in 1989

=== December 1989 ===
The first public demonstrations took place on 6 December 1989 in Erdenet, the second-largest city of the MPR. During the demonstration, protestors submitted demands for the full withdrawal of Soviet troops from Erdenet; the full nationalization of Erdenet Mining Corporation (jointly owned by the MPR and the USSR); and the resignation of the Politburo of the MPRP to local party structures.

The next day, on 7 December, similar demonstrations by teachers and students took place at Ard Ayush square in Khovd, the provincial capital of Khovd Province. The demonstrators handed over demands for the resignation of the Politburo and the government to the local governing body, which were to be delivered to Ulaanbaatar, the capital.

On the morning of 10 December 1989, on International Human Rights Day, the first open pro-democracy public demonstration occurred in front of the Youth Cultural Center in Ulaanbaatar, where the creation of the Mongolian Democratic Union (MDU) was announced with Sanjaasürengiin Zorig as general organizer. During the demonstration, around 300 protestors submitted 13-point demands to the government. The demands included a multi-party system, free elections with universal suffrage, the replacement of a centrally planned economy with a market economy, private property, re-organization of the government, and protection of human rights, particularly freedom of religion. The protesters injected a nationalist element into the protests by using traditional Mongolian script—which most Mongolians could not read—as a symbolic repudiation of the political system that had imposed the Mongolian Cyrillic alphabet.

Many now-prominent figures, such as Tsakhiagiin Elbegdorj , along with Dari-Sukhbaatar and Chimediin Enkhee, were members of the MDU and would eventually come to be known as the Thirteen Leaders of Mongolia's Democratic Revolution, commonly referred to as the First 13 (Анхны 13) or the 13 of Democracy (Ардчиллын 13). MDU members and anyone associated with the movement had to be secretive to ensure their security. Members that were known to be associated with the organisation were laid off on the basis of "engaging in conduct inconsistent with communist and socialist ideology". Later on 28 December, the Democratic Socialist Movement (DSM) was founded by social democratic intelligentsia, notably historian and writer Bat-Erdeniin Batbayar, better known by his pseudonym, Baabar.

Demonstrations drastically increased by late December when the news of Garry Kasparov's interview with Playboy broke. The interview suggested that the Soviet Union might sell Mongolia to China in order to raise money. Soviet spokesman stated that the comments caused a large amount of protest letters and petitions arriving at Soviet missions in Mongolia.

=== January 1990 ===
On 2 January 1990, the MDU began distributing leaflets calling for a democratic revolution.

Flag of the Mongolian People's Republic (1945–1992)

Modified flag of Mongolia used by protestors; later adopted as official flag in 1992

On 14 January 1990, the protesters, having grown from 300 to around five thousand, the biggest ever yet, gathered in the square in front of the Lenin Museum. The protest, which criticized the top leadership, led to the government to respond by banning unauthorized demonstrations; and criticizing the protests.

Despite the ban, a demonstration at Sükhbaatar Square on 21 January (in weather of −30°C) followed, the fourth one organized by the MDU. The police reportedly made no attempts to dismantle the protest, which drew an estimated 2,500 to 7,000 people. Protesters carried banners alluding to Chinggis Khaan, rehabilitating a figure which the socialist school curriculums had outright banned. They also celebrated Daramyn Tömör-Ochir, a politician who was purged from the MPRP in 1962 as part of the MPRP's efforts to suppress the commemoration of the 800th anniversary of Chinggis Khaan's birth. The protestors carried a modified Flag of Mongolia, which distinctly lacked the star representing the country's socialist beliefs; this flag would eventually become the official flag after the revolution. MDU organizer and leader Zorig called for the removal of a constitutional clause that allowed the MPRP to rule over Mongolia.

=== February 1990 ===
In subsequent months, activists continued to organise demonstrations, rallies, protests, and hunger strikes, as well as teachers' and workers' strikes. Activists had growing support from Mongolians, both in the capital and the countryside, and the MDU's activities led to other calls for democracy all over the country. The demonstrations expanded to thousands in the capital city, Ulaanbaatar, and to other major cities, such as Erdenet and Darkhan, as well as to provincial centers like Mörön.

Following the decision to remove of the CPSU's leading role in the USSR, four to five thousand people attended a three-hour demonstration near Lenin Museum on 11 February. Demonstrators at the MDU's fifth major protest demanded the MPRP to do the same. Calls for the resignation of leader Batmönkh and the politburo were made amid stagnating economy under premier Sodnom.

On 18 February 1990, the MDU convened its first Congress with 611 representatives and 200 guests from 16 provinces and 3 cities. During the congress, the MDU announced the establishment of the country's first opposition party, the Mongolian Democratic Party (MDP), and the first independent print press, Shine Toli (Шинэ толь), was issued the same day. Around 30 foreign journalists came to report on the events. During the Congress, the establishment of the New Progressive Union (NPU), the third opposition organization, was also announced. Large-scale demonstrations were followed by the creation of the first opposition parties of Mongolia.

=== March 1990 ===
Following the creation of the MDP, the DSM established the Mongolian Social Democratic Party (MSDP) on 2 March. The same month, the Mongolian National Progress Party was created by the NPU, and the Mongolian Green Party was established by conservationists.

Demonstrations by the four opposition groups near Sükhbaatar Square, 4 March 1990

After numerous demonstrations of thousands in both the capital city and provincial centers, on 4 March 1990, the MDU, the DSM, the NPU, and the Mongolian Students' Union held a joint outdoor mass meeting, inviting the government to attend. The government sent no representative to what became the largest ever demonstration of over 100,000 people demanding democratic change.

Deputy premier Dashiin Byambasüren meeting with MDP chairman Erdeniin Bat-Üül and other hunger strikers at Sükhbaatar Square, circa 9 March 1990

On 7 March 1990, at Sükhbaatar Square, the MDU initially started a hunger strike of ten, urging the current government to resign. The hunger strike escalated as thousands gathered to join the strike, declaring that the strike would not end until the resignation of the current government.

The next day, the Politburo of the MPRP – the highest authority of the party – eventually gave way to the pressure and entered negotiations with opposition leaders. Televised round table talks were held between various activists and government figures including MDU chairman Sanjaasürengiin Zorig, premier Dumaagiin Sodnom, and deputy premier Dashiin Byambasüren on 8-9 March 1990.

Behind the scenes within the Politburo, there were serious discussions about cracking down on the protestors. Eventually, a decree was written, awaiting approval from the General Secretary of the MPRP, Jambyn Batmönkh, that would effectively repress the protests. Batmönkh outwardly opposed the decree, maintaining that they must "under no circumstances resort to using violence" (Хэрхэвч Хүч хэрэглэж болохгүй). Those who were present there later recalled that Batmönkh said, "I will never sign this. We few Mongols have not yet come to the point that we will make each other's noses bleed," smacked the table, and left the room."

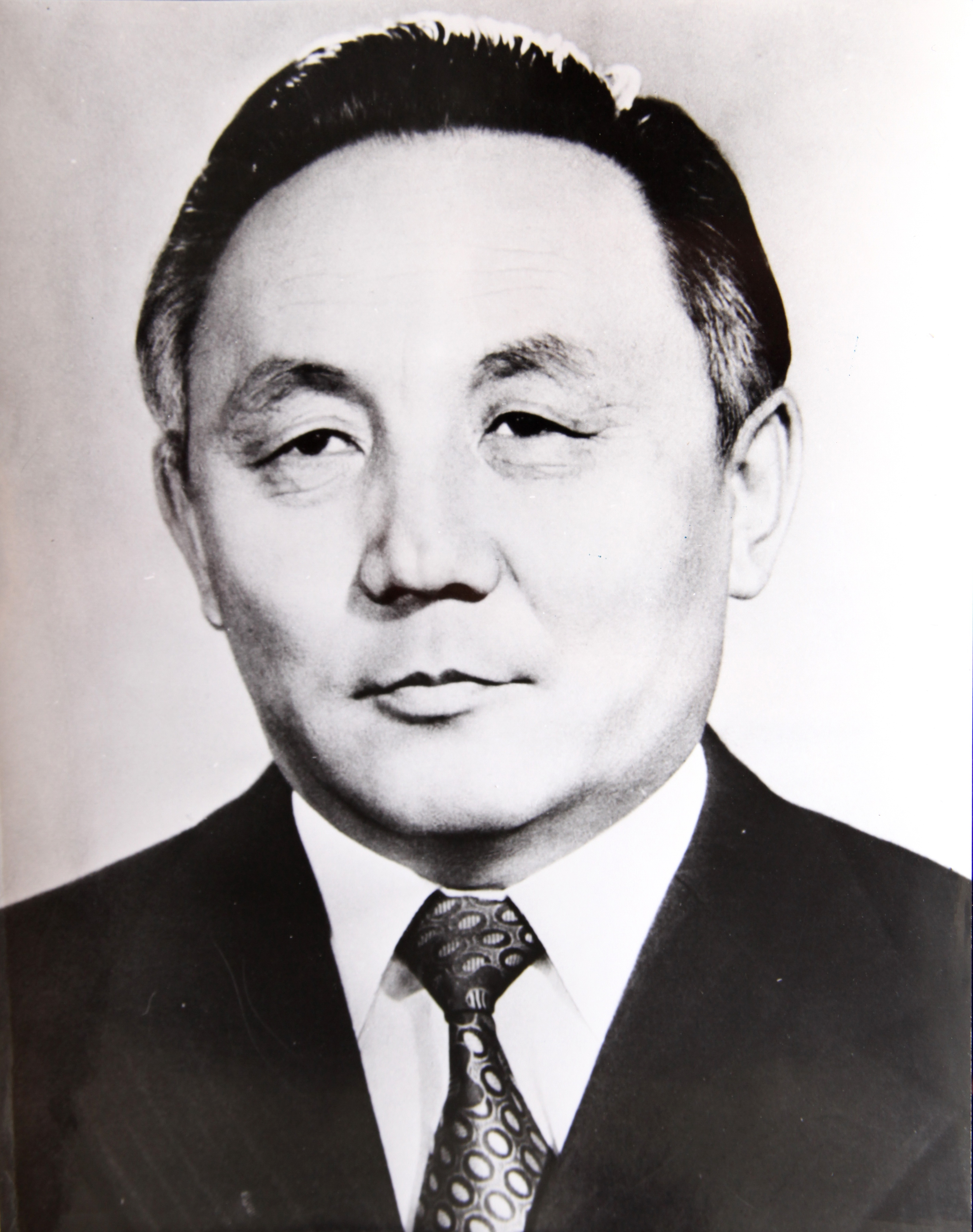
Jambyn Batmönkh (pictured), general secretary of the MPRP and head of state

An agreement was reached between the two sides on 9 March 1990. Subsequently that same day, Batmönkh announced his resignation and dissolution of the politburo, which would be later discussed by the Central Committee, in a Friday night broadcast. Elbegdorj announced the news of the Politburo resignation to the hunger strikers and to people who had gathered on Sükhbaatar Square at 10:00 pm, ending the hunger strike. A future general strike by the movement was also called off.

During the special MPRP Central Committee plenum on 12-14 March, party leader Batmönkh was relieved from his post with Gombojavyn Ochirbat as his successor on 14 March. Suggestion to the end of the party's exclusive control, and hold multi-party elections and constitutional changes were made. The outgoing politburo was relieved and reshuffled with new reform-minded leaders, paving the way for political reform in Mongolia.

On 21-23 March 1990, an extraordinary session of the People's Great Khural was convened. During the legislative session, the following constitutional provision: "The guiding force of the Mongolian People's Republic is the Mongolian People's Revolutionary Party, which uses the all-conquering Marxist-Leninist theory in its operations." was removed (324-10) from the Constitution of 1960; ending the almost 70 years of one-party rule. Incumbent head of state, Jambyn Batmönkh, and head of government, Dumaagiin Sodnom, were relieved of their duties on 21 March 1990. Punsalmaagiin Ochirbat was appointed as Chairman of the Presidium of the People's Great Khural (head of state) and Sharavyn Gungaadorj as Chairman of the Council of Ministers (head of government), although it was agreed that the Great Khural would meet again in May to discuss further constitutional change, making these appointments temporary.

== Aftermath ==
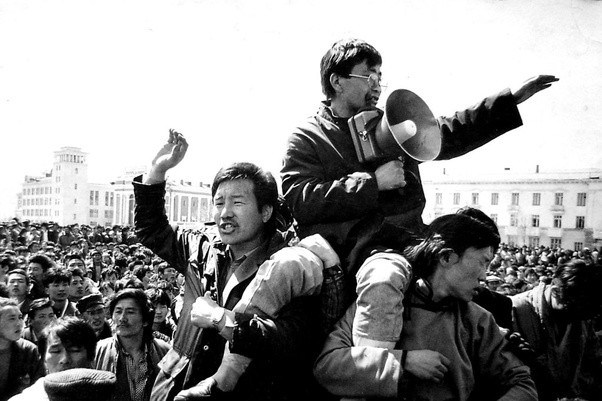
Sanjaasürengiin Zorig calming down the crowd at Sükhbaatar Square, April 1990

During the MPRP's extraordinary party congress between 10 and 13 April, MPRP general secretary G.Ochirbat urged the party to deepen the party restructuring and party renewal, distancing itself from Marxism–Leninism. Also the same month, during their own congress on 8 April, the main opposition MDP stressed its aim to democratise all public mass organizations and reform the Mongolian political system, as well as to develop private ownership of property.

Labour strike by coal miners occurred in Baganuur on 13 April, in response Soviet managers laying off several Mongolian workers. Some 150 truck drivers joined the strike, backed by opposition groups, in Darkhan on 15 April.

By mid-April, new demonstrations were organized by the six opposition groups to force the MPRP (largely as a consequence of the lack of funding and media access for the newly formed opposition parties in contrast to the ruling MPRP). The demonstrations of 30 to 50 thousand people in late April led to an early return of president P.Ochirbat from his visit to China and use of the Mongolian People's Army to preserve order. On April 27, the government accused the MDP for criminal acts against the state and social discipline. Clashes between protestors and guarding soldiers were prevented when Zorig calmed the crowd on a shoulder of a companion. Tensions eased on April 30 when the both sides agreed to meet to discuss formal constitutional amendments. However, some unauthorized demonstrations, sit-ins, and hunger strikes around the country continued up until early May.

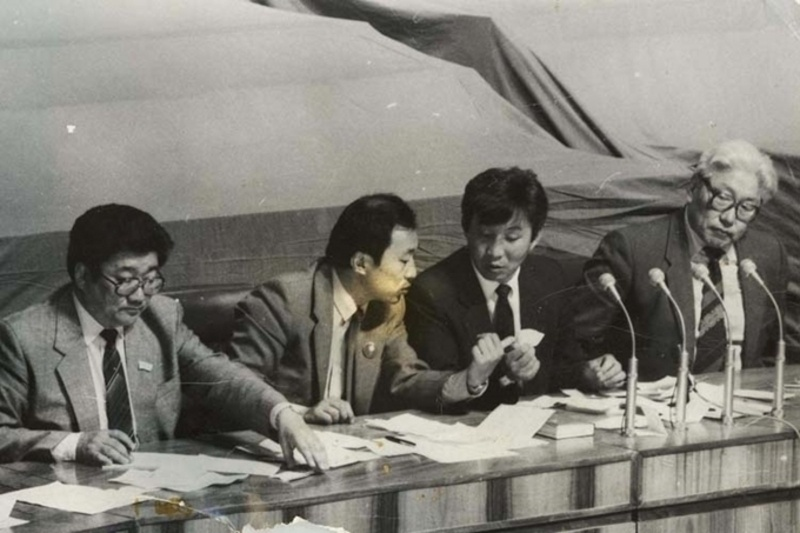
President P.Ochirbat (leftmost) and deputy premier D.Byambasüren (rightmost) with opposition leaders Da.Ganbold (centre-left) and E.Bat-Üül (centre-right) during a legislative session, circa June 1990

Meetings were held on April 30, and free elections to the national, provincial, and municipal legislatures were agreed on May 14. Alongside the new electoral law, the People's Great Khural approved the Law on Political Parties and enacted amendments to the constitution which allowed the creation of the "Little Khural," the main legislative and supervisory parliament. In the lead up to the election, six political parties were registered by the Supreme Court in May.

=== First free and fair elections ===
Mongolia's first free, multi-party elections for the People's Great Khural were held on 29 July 1990. In the 1990 parliamentary elections, parties ran for 430 seats in the Great Khural. Opposition parties were not able to nominate enough candidates. The opposition MDP nominated 346 candidates for the 430 seats in the Great Khural. The ruling MPRP won 357 seats in the People's Great Khural. Compared to the opposition parties, the MPRP enjoyed a strong position in the countryside.

The People's Great Khural (upper house) first met on 3 September 1990 and elected incumbent head of state Punsalmaagiin Ochirbat (MPRP) as president on 3 September; Radnaasümbereliin Gonchigdorj (MSDP) as vice-president and Dashiin Byambasüren as prime minister (MPRP) on 11 September; and proportionally elected the 50 members to the State Little Khural (lower house) to the party vote cast in July. Of the 50 seats, the MPRP received 31 seats while opposition parties received the remaining 19 seats. The Little Khural, the standing legislature, convened its first session on 13 September 1990.

The new MPRP government under Dashiin Byambasüren shared power with the opposition parties, allocating two high cabinet positions to the MDP and the MNPP, and implemented constitutional and economic reforms. As these reforms coincided with the dissolution of the Soviet Union, which had until 1990 provided significant economic aid to Mongolia's state budget, the country experienced harsh economic downturn which caused enterprises to close down, inflation to rise, and basic food to be rationed for a time. Foreign trade broke down, economic and technical aid from the former socialist countries ended, and domestic economy struggled with privatisation. A thriving black market arose in Ulaanbaatar by 1988 to accommodate the needs of the populace.

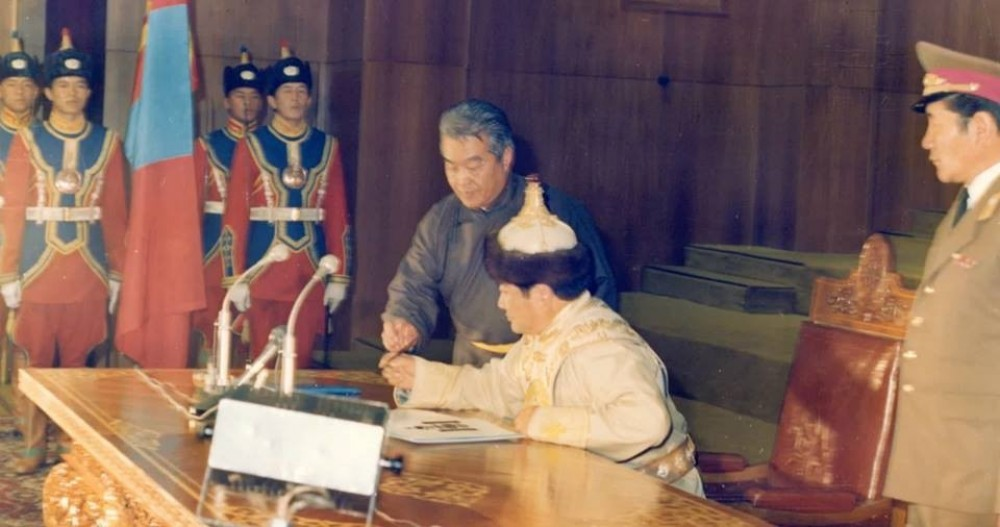
Punsalmaagiin Ochirbat, the first president of Mongolia, ratifying the 1992 Constitution on 13 January 1992.

=== New constitution ===
In November 1991, the People's Great Khural began discussion on a new constitution, which entered into force on 12 February 1992. In addition to establishing Mongolia as an independent, sovereign republic and guaranteeing a number of rights and freedoms, the new constitution restructured the legislative branch of government, creating the unicameral legislature, the State Great Khural.

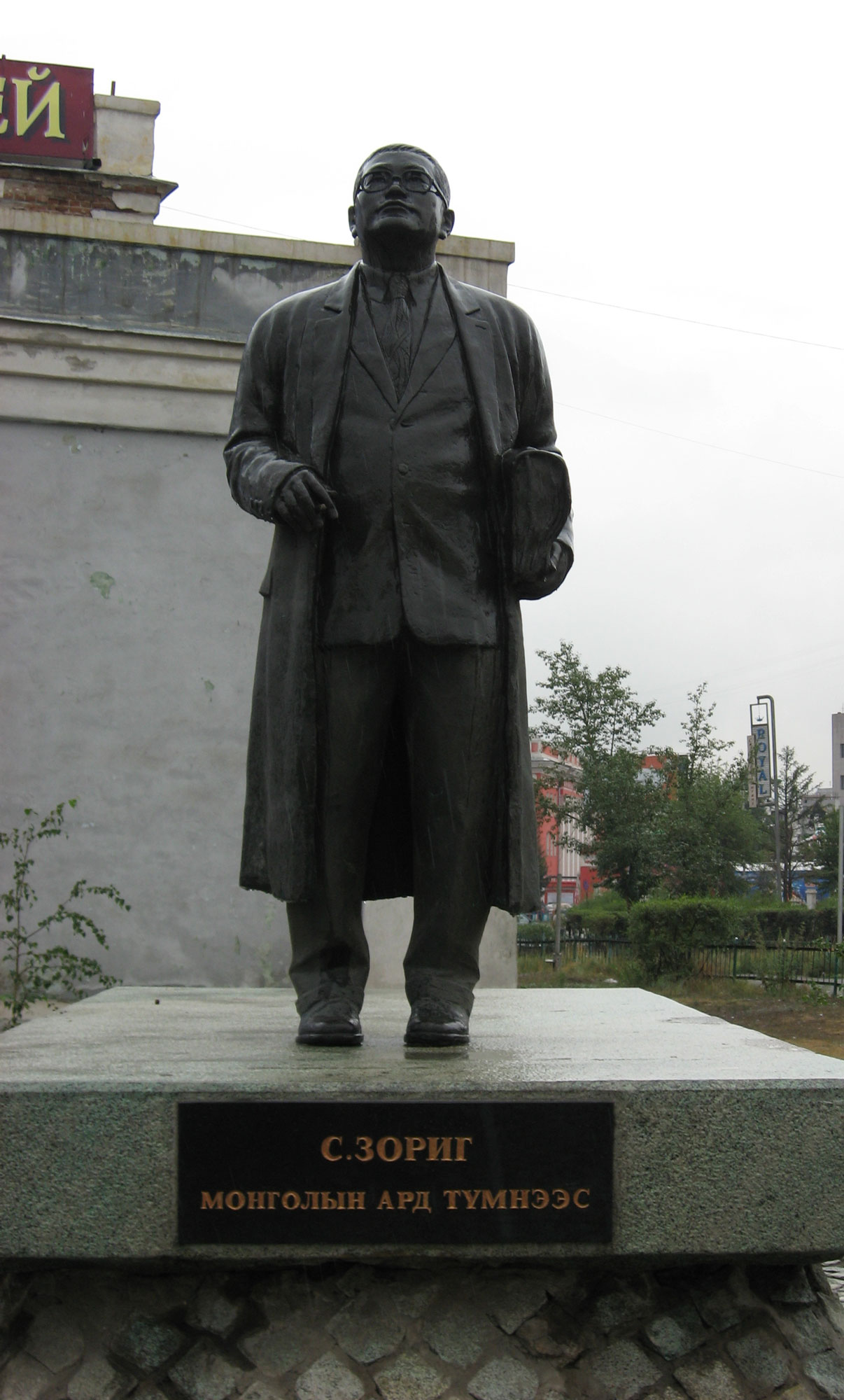
A statue of pro-democracy leader Sanjaasürengiin Zorig (1962–1998)

The first election major win for the Democratic opposition was the presidential election of 1993, when the nominee of the Mongolian Social Democratic Party (MSDP) and the Mongolian National Democratic Party (MNDP), incumbent Punsalmaagiin Ochirbat, (Note: Despite being a member of the MPRP, Ochirbat wasn't picked by the party as their presidential candidate. Consequently, he agreed to run as the opposition candidate of the Mongolian National Democratic Party and the Mongolian Social Democratic Party.) won by 59.89% of the total vote. The Democratic Union Coalition, co-led by MNDP chairman Tsakhiagiin Elbegdorj, for the first time succeeded in winning parliamentary majority in the 1996 parliamentary elections. However, the administration faced a stagnating economy, political infighting, and cabinet crises between during its four-year tenure. Sanjaasürengiin Zorig, the main pro-democracy leader and then industrial minister, was assassinated at his home in October 1998, during an ongoing crisis on the succession of ousted prime minister Elbegdorj. The factionalism within the coalition led to its electoral defeat to the MPRP in 2000 and consequent establishment of the merger party, the Democratic Party, in December 2000.

== See also ==
- Revolutions of 1989
- 1990 Mongolian parliamentary election
- History of modern Mongolia
- Mongolian Revolution of 1911
- Mongolian Revolution of 1921
