= Democratic Union Coalition (1996–2000) =

Political party alliance in Mongolia

Democratic Union Coalition Ардчилсан Холбоо Эвсэл
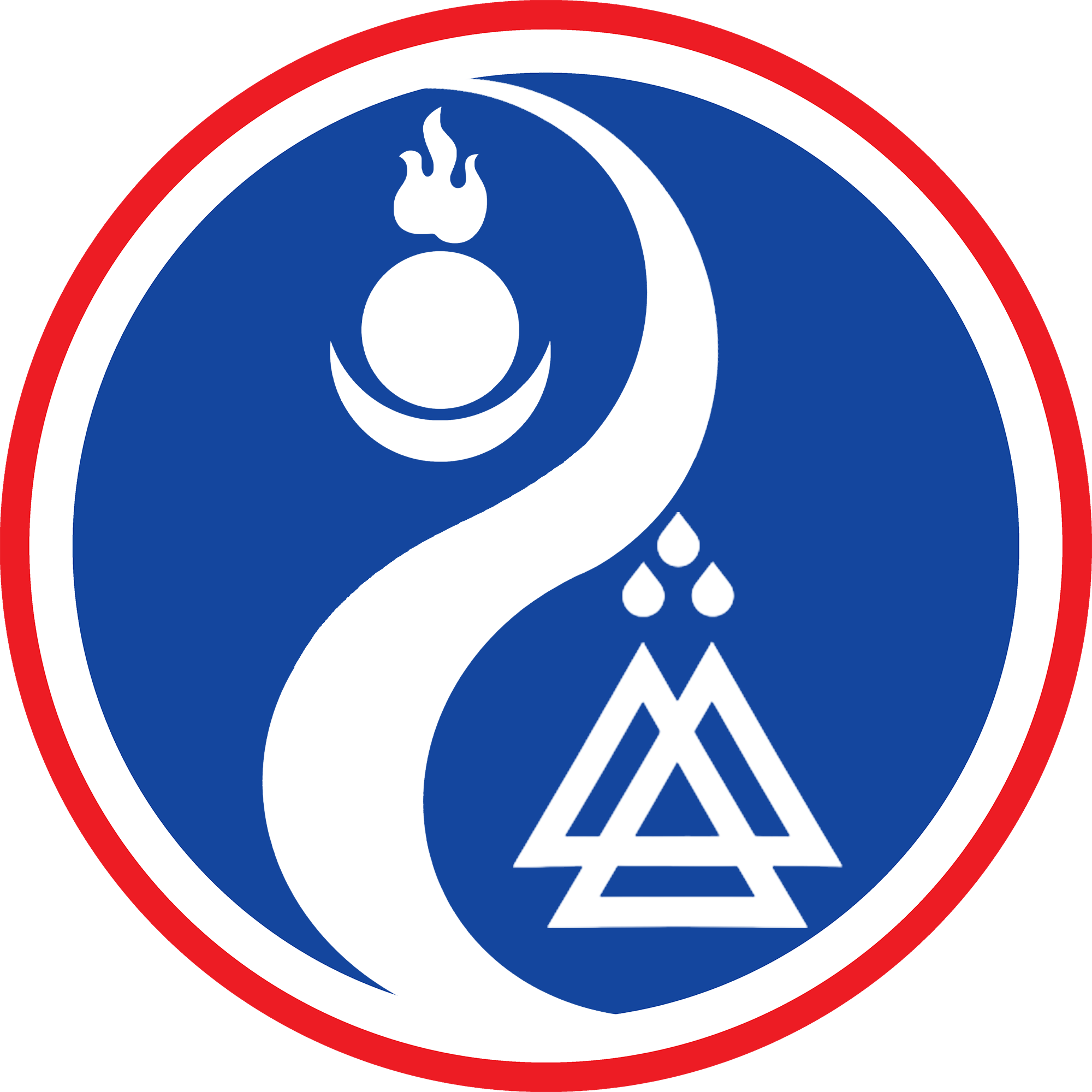
- Abbreviation: DU or DUC (English) "АХ" эвсэл (Mongolian)
- Chairperson: Tsakhiagiin Elbegdorj
- Founded: 26 February 1996
- Dissolved: c. July 2000
- Succeeded by: Democratic Party (de facto)
- Ideology: Big tent Reformism; Mongolian nationalism Factions: Conservatism; Liberalism; Social democracy
- Political position: Big tent
- Coalition parties: Mongolian National Democratic Party; Mongolian Social Democratic Party; Mongolian Green Party; Mongolian Democratic Renaissance Party
- Colors: Blue
- State Great Khural (1996–2000): 50 / 76

Party flag

The Democratic Union Coalition (Mongolian: Ардчилсан Холбоо Эвсэл, romanized: Ardchilsan Kholboo Evsel) was a coalition of political parties in Mongolia. Its primary constituents were the Mongolian National Democratic Party (MNDP) and the Mongolian Social Democratic Party (MSDP).

Its core policies were the implementation of political and economic reforms in Mongolia's post-communist period. The coalition chairman was Tsakhiagiin Elbegdorj from 1996 to 2000. The DUC won a landslide victory in the 1996 parliamentary election, forming the first fully non-MPRP cabinet with a supermajority of 50 seats in the State Great Khural. The DUC's election victory is widely attributed to its electoral strategy, based on the 1994 Contract with America, and to American support for Mongolia's democratization since the 1990s.

After four years of political instability and economic stagnation, the DUC faced a significant defeat in the 2000 parliamentary election, winning only a single parliamentary seat. It soon became the foundation of the current Democratic Party of Mongolia.

== Founding ==
Prior to the 1996 parliamentary elections, a political coalition called the "Democratic Union" was formed between the MNDP, the MSDP, the Mongolian Green Party, and the Mongolian Democratic Renaissance Party (MDRP) on 26 February 1996. Tsakhiagiin Elbegdorj was elected as the chairman of the Democratic Union and later the next chairman of the MNDP in April.

Initial composition of the Democratic Union Coalition
Party name	Abbr.	Leader	Position	Ideology
Mongolian National Democratic Party; Монгол Үндэсний Ардчилсан Нам; Mongol Ündesnii Ardchilsan Nam	MNDP; МҮАН	Tsakhiagiin Elbegdorj	Centre-right	Reformism Liberal conservatism
Mongolian Social Democratic Party; Монголын Социал Демократ Нам; Mongolyn Sotsial Demokrat Nam	MSDP; МСДН	Radnaasümbereliin Gonchigdorj	Centre-left	Social democracy
Mongolian Green Party; Монголын Ногоон Нам; Mongolyn Nogoon Nam	MGP; МНН	Davaagiin Basandorj	Centre-left	Green politics
Mongolian Democratic Renaissance Party; Монголын Ардчилсан Сэргэн Мандлын Нам; Mongolyn Ardchilsan Sergen Mandlyn Nam	MDRP; МАСМН	Dashiin Byambasüren	Centre-left	Reformism

=== American involvement ===
The Democratic opposition received a considerable amount of support from the Konrad Adenauer Foundation and the International Republican Institute (IRI), an American nonprofit organization mostly aligned with the Republican Party in the United States. According to the Washington Post, the American assistance began in late 1991. Kirsten Edmondson, the IRI program manager for Mongolia, told the Washington Post that it was a personal request from United States Secretary of State James Baker after his return from an official visit to Ulaanbaatar in July 1991. Secretary of State James Baker had previously visited Ulaanbaatar in August 1990.

The IRI dispatched several staff members to Mongolia and convinced opposition parties, students, activists, nongovernmental organizations, intellectuals, and businessmen to form a united coalition after the 1992 election. The organization trained candidates and supporters from the DUC to persuade voters with relevant messages, grass-roots party development, and recruitment.

Much of the coalition's campaign strategy was drawn from the Contract with America, a 1994 legislative agenda advocated by the U.S. Republican Party. In late 1995, Speaker of the U.S. House of Representatives and co-author of the Contract with America, Newt Gingrich, sent the authors of the Republican agenda to Ulaanbaatar. Working with the authors, the DUC drafted the "Contract With the Mongolian Voter," which served as its main electoral strategy. The Contract with the Mongolian Voter became one of the most widely distributed documents in modern Mongolian history, according to Mongolian officials and the IRI, with around 350,000 copies printed in 1996.

== Government ==
In the 1996 parliamentary elections, the Democratic Union won in a landslide victory, winning 50 out of 76 seats in the State Great Khural and defeating the ex-communist Mongolian People's Revolutionary Party (MPRP). For the first time since the 1921 revolution, the MPRP had not been in power, and for the first time since the 1990 Democratic Revolution, a major electoral victory for the pro-democracy opposition was achieved. Of the 50 seats, 34 belonged to the MNDP, 13 to the MSDP, and 3 to non-party candidates allied with the coalition. All 50 elected members of parliament were trained by the IRI, according to government leaders.

Former U.S. Secretary of State James Baker was on hand to witness the coalition victory, having returned as a private citizen to serve as an official election monitor on 30 June.

Party	Seats
Mongolian National Democratic Party	34
Mongolian Social Democratic Party	13
Non-party candidates	3
Total	50
Source: General Election Commission

=== Enkhsaikhan cabinet (1996–1998) ===
Prime Ministers of Mongolia between 1996 and 2000

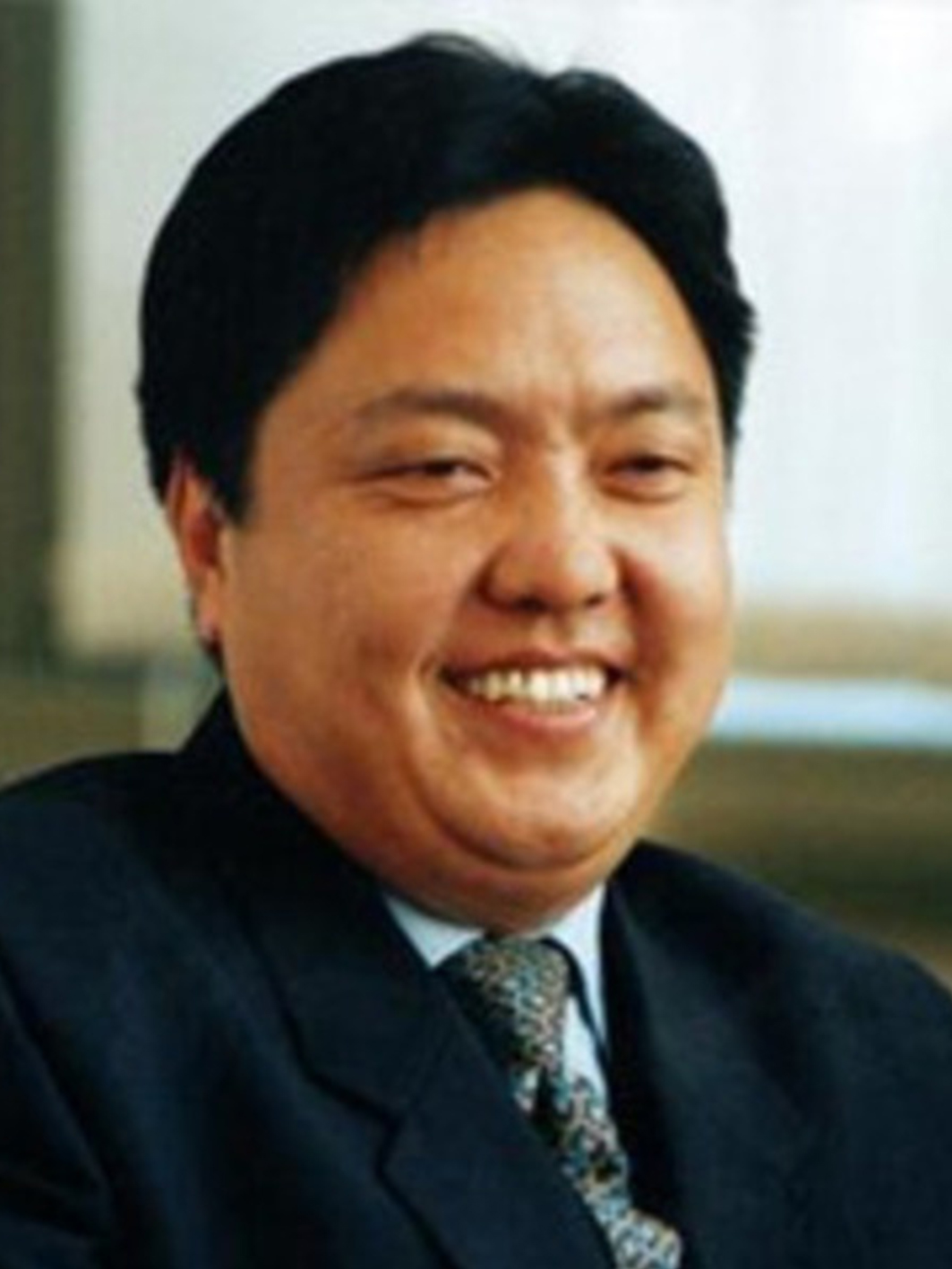
Mendsaikhany Enkhsaikhan
(1996–1998)

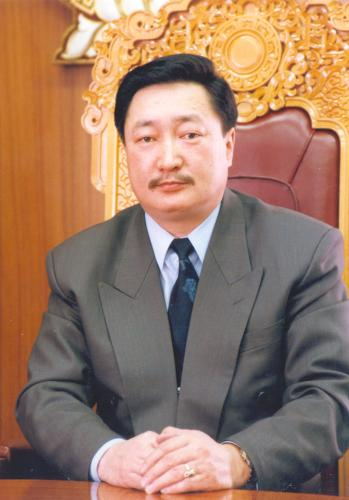
Janlavyn Narantsatsralt
(1998–1999)

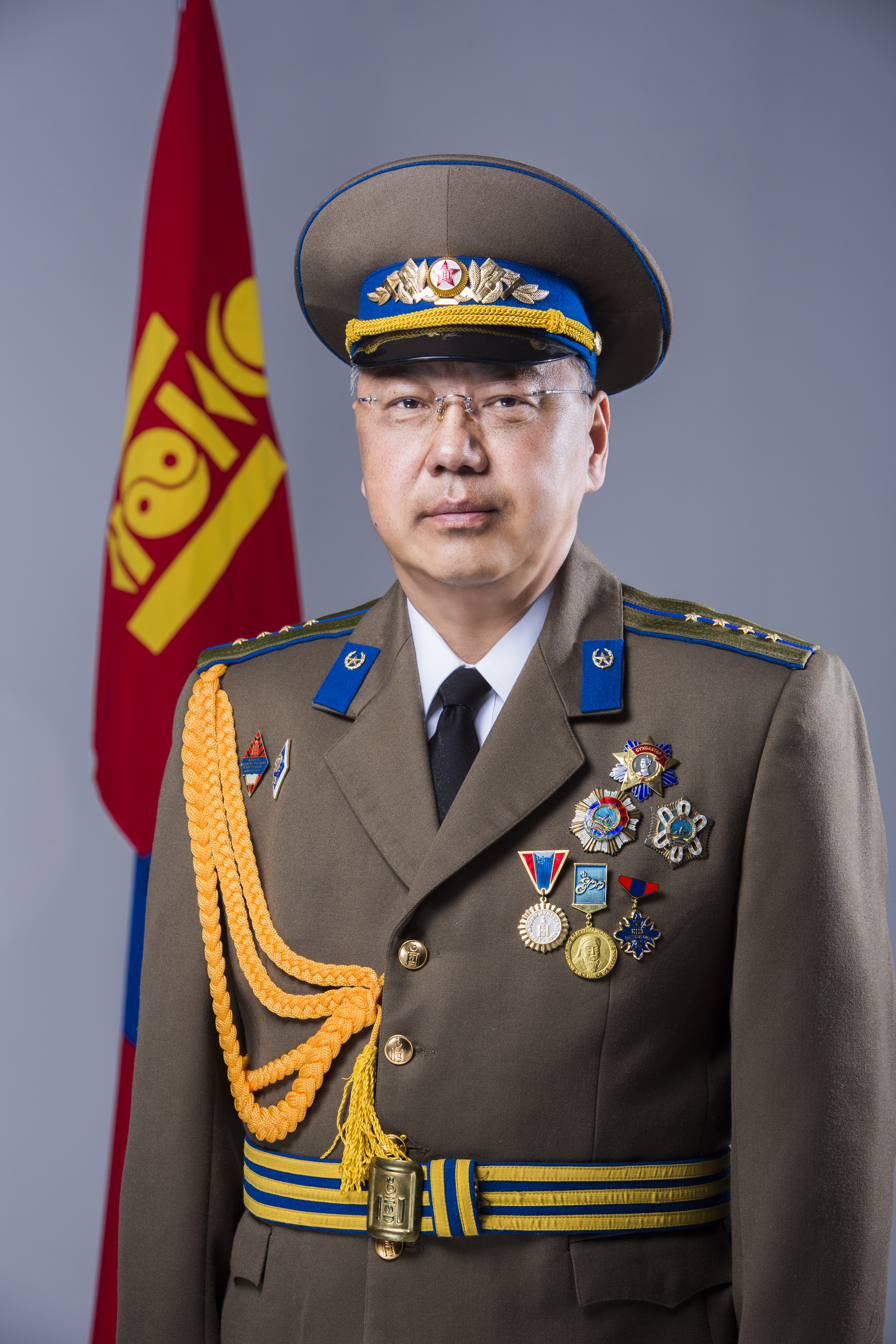
Rinchinnyamyn Amarjargal
(1999–2000)

Former member of parliament and manager of the elections campaign of the Democratic Union, Mendsaikhany Enkhsaikhan (MSDP), became the 18th Prime Minister of Mongolia on 18 July 1996. Enkhsaikhan's term mainly focused on hastening economic reforms, privatization, and social reforms promised by the Contract with the Mongolian Voter.

==== 1997 presidential election ====
In the 1997 presidential election, incumbent president and DUC candidate, Punsalmaagiin Ochirbat, was defeated by the MPRP candidate and former chairman of the State Great Khural, Natsagiin Bagabandi, with around 30 percent vote difference. Bagabandi's election was described as a protest vote against the DUC government's rapid economic reforms. According to the 1992 Constitution, the President holds a limited amount of powers—in principle, the power to veto—while most political power rests in the legislative branch, the State Great Khural. The DUC's 50-seat majority, though substantial, was still one vote short of the margin needed to override presidential vetoes.

Political tensions intensified in early 1998, when a series of parliamentary maneuvers by the MPRP and the DUC occurred. In addition to political discord, harsh winters, the 1997 Asian financial crisis, and the 1998 Russian financial crisis adversely affected Mongolia's largely agricultural economy.

On 27 March 1998, the General Council of the MNDP voted in favor of Enkhsaikhan's resignation. MNDP chairman Elbegdorj suggested that the low approval of the current cabinet stemmed from a lack of coordination between the government and parliament. Most of the MPs also argued the party chairman should assume the role of premiership.

In April 1998, majority of the MNDP and MSDP lawmakers turned against Enkhsaikhan on the grounds of slow social reforms and the breakdown of relations between the legislative and executive branches. Enkhsaikhan was forced to resign on 17 April 1998 amid public discontent over harsh reform measures he had adopted to bolster Mongolia's economy.

=== Elbegdorj cabinet (1998) ===
Tsakhiagiin Elbegdorj, chairman of the MNDP and the parliamentary caucus, was elected (61-6) by the State Great Khural to become the 19th prime minister.

One of his most significant decisions was to collect taxes from then-biggest taxpayer and only significant income contributor, the copper ore mining and processing Erdenet Mining Corporation (EMC), a joint stock company owned by the governments of Mongolia and the Russian Federation (previously the Soviet Union). EMC hadn't paid due tax, income, and royalty to Mongolia's government between 1997 and 1998.

After becoming prime minister, Elbegdorj ordered an audit of the EMC. The audit found that the state's due income did not enter the state account; instead, it went to the accounts of EMC directors. This corruption-related case was reported in detail in the investigative series "Swindle of the Century" on Eagle television. Elbegdorj dismissed the long-time EMC chairman, Sh.Otgonbileg, and placed Dambiin Dorligjav (former defense minister) as the new chairman.

On 27 May, at the recommendation of international financial institutions such as the IMF, the World Bank, and the Asian Development Bank, Elbegdorj made a decision to sell the bankrupt state-owned Reconstruction Bank, established in 1997. At that time, Golomt Bank was the sole private commercial bank in Mongolia and the only one that offered to buy Reconstruction Bank.

In response to this bank merger and the change in EMC's chairman, the minority MPRP demanded that Elbegdorj resign in June, which resulted in Elbegdorj losing a vote of no confidence on 25 July. In the secret vote, 42 MPs voted against Elbegdorj while 33 voted in favor. He became the shortest-serving prime minister of Mongolia, with only three months, and remained caretaker until the next prime minister was nominated, approved by the president, and appointed by parliament.

=== Political crisis ===
After Elbegdorj's resignation, MPRP President Bagabandi sought greater involvement in domestic politics. He reinterpreted the constitution and substantially expanded the articles on the president's advisory role with parliament on the selection of a prime minister. The ruling coalition rejected this expansion of power but was outflanked by the Constitutional Court, largely dominated by MPRP judges. President Bagabandi rejected three nominees a total of 11 times (Davaadorjiin Ganbold was rejected 7 times alone). A fourth nominee that cleared the presidential desk was voted down in the parliament. The minority MPRP, allied with the Mongolian Traditional United Party's single MP, had enough seats in parliament to protest and block the two-thirds quorum required to appoint the next prime minister or to discuss any parliamentary motion. As president, Bagabandi went so far as to submit a list of candidates he would approve to the parliament.

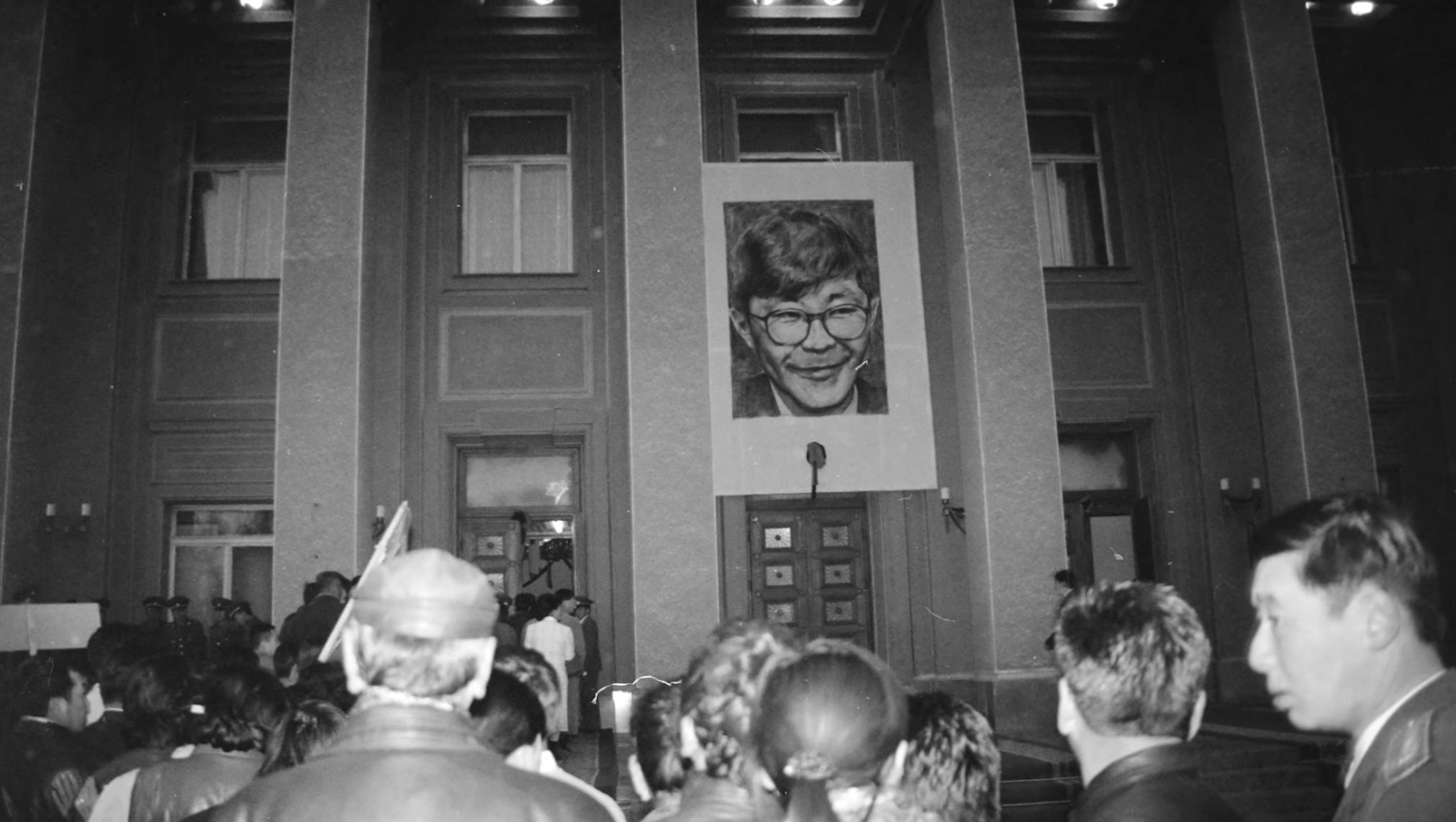
State funeral of Sanjaasürengiin Zorig, three days after his death on 5 October 1998; around 30,000 people gathered to pay tribute to him

During the ensuing government crisis, the leading figure of the 1990 revolution, Minister of Infrastructure and MNDP lawmaker Sanjaasürengiin Zorig was assassinated in his home on 2 October 1998. Thousands of mourners crowded Sükhbaatar Square in Ulaanbaatar, and to this day, the case remains still unsolved. His murder came days before the coalition was to submit his name to the president as the next prime minister. Zorig's seat in parliament was filled by his sister, Sanjaasürengiin Oyun, after she won a by-election in Dornod Province.

At the end of the 1998 political turmoil, Janlavyn Narantsatsralt, a candidate on President Bagabandi's list of acceptable nominees, was selected by the DUC as a candidate for prime minister.

=== Narantsatsralt cabinet (1998–1999) ===
Former mayor of Ulaanbaatar, Janlavyn Narantsatsralt (MNDP), was approved by President Bagabandi and appointed the 20th prime minister on 9 December. He succeeded Elbegdorj, who, by then, had served longer as acting prime minister (five months) than as prime minister (three months). The appointment of Narantsatsralt for a brief period ended the year-long political turmoil between the parliamentary majority and the President. His tenure was noted to be largely uneventful by observers.

Narantsatsralt served until July 1999, when he resigned due to backlash over a controversial letter to the Russian Federation regarding the EMC. Given the issues surrounding Erdenet and Russia's partnership, its privatization was particularly sensitive. It was revealed in June 1999 that prime minister Narantsatsralt had written the Russian government about their share of a Mongolian copper mine. This caused outrage among some MPs, who argued that his action compromised national security. Later, in July, he lost a secret vote in which his own party members voted alongside the MPRP to bring down his government. The vote of no confidence appeared to be based more on personal political agendas than policy stances.

=== Amarjargal cabinet (1999–2000) ===
Foreign minister Rinchinnyamyn Amarjargal (MNDP) succeeded him as the 21st prime minister on 30 July 1999. He served until the 2000 parliamentary election was held in July 2000.

Amarjargal was initially regarded as an effective prime minister for building consensus between the two sides, but as the 2000 elections approached, the opposition MPRP blocked any government measures that might prove popular with voters or walked out on debates. Due to this gridlock, the public largely viewed the coalition as ineffective and inexperienced in governing.

== Dissolution ==
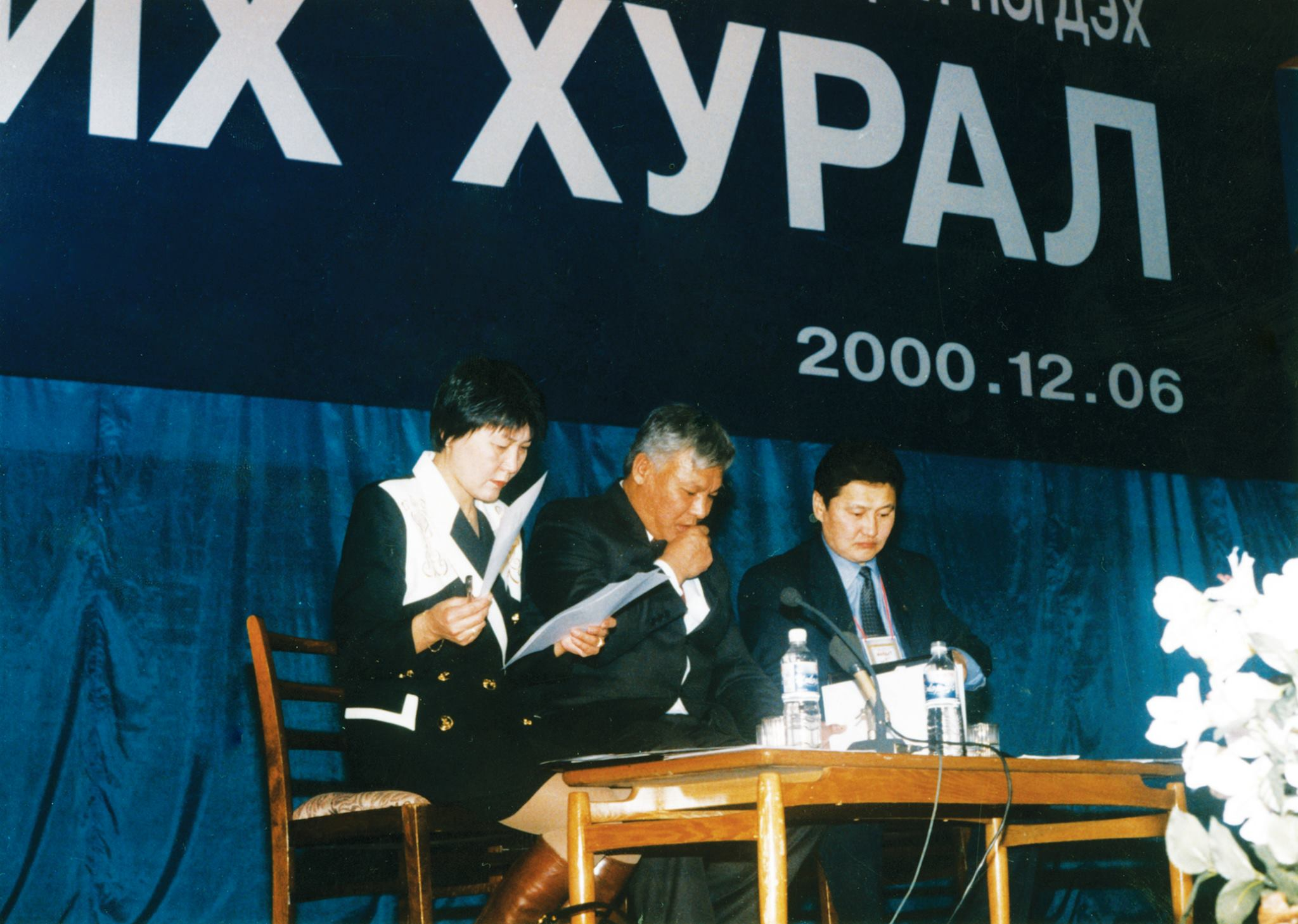
Congress between five Mongolian opposition parties for the founding of the Democratic Party on 6 December 2000

In January 2000, the chairman of the MNDP in Ulaanbaatar, Sodnomzunduin Erdene, and two other high-ranking MNDP members re-established the Mongolian Democratic Party (MDP), a party that founded the MNDP in 1992. Further split occurred on 9 March 2000, when legislator Oyun and Zorig's former allies split off from the MDP to found the Civil Will Party. The Mongolian Green Party, an initial DUC member party, left the coalition to form an alliance with the newly founded Civil Will Party. The MSDP exited the coalition in mid-2000 to field its own candidates for the election.

By the June 2000 elections, the Democratic Union had effectively split, with only the MNDP and the Mongolian Religious Democratic Party (MRDP) remaining.

The MPRP won an overwhelming supermajority of 72 seats in the State Great Khural, nearly wiping out the entire opposition from parliament. The coalition lost its previous 49 seats and won a single seat. Subsequently, it was dissolved after the election defeat. The former constituents of the coalition decided to merge and found a new opposition party, a decision primarily driven by the MDP.

The MNDP, the MSDP, the MDP, the MDRP, and the MRDP later merged into the Democratic Party of Mongolia on 6 December 2000, a date commemorating 1206, when the Mongol Empire was founded by Genghis Khan.

== Electoral history ==
=== Presidential elections ===
Election	Party candidate	Votes	%	Result
1997	Punsalmaagiin Ochirbat	292,896	30.65%	Lost ✗

=== State Great Khural elections ===
Election	Party leader	Votes	%	Seats	+/–	Position	Government
1996	Tsakhiagiin Elbegdorj	475,267	47.05%	50 / 76	▲50	▲1st	Supermajority government
2000	Rinchinnyamyn Amarjargal	133,890	13.35%	1 / 76	▼49	▼2nd	Opposition
