= President of the Mongolian People's Republic =

- Бүгд Найрамдах Монгол Ард Улсын Ерөнхийлөгч
- State emblem of the Mongolian People's Republic

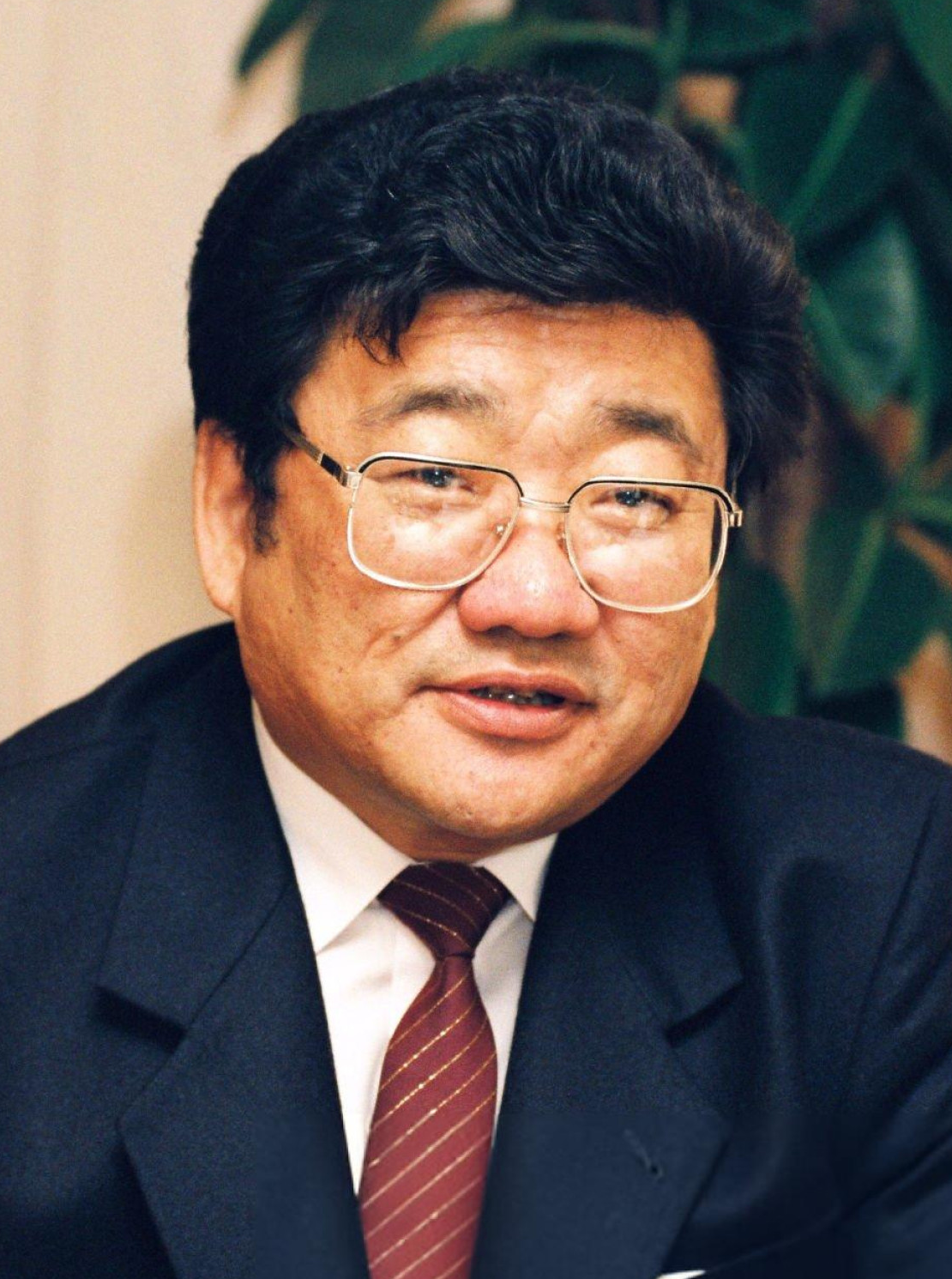
- Only office holder Punsalmaagiin Ochirbat; 3 September 1990 – 12 February 1992
- Style: Mr. President (informal); His Excellency (diplomatic); Comrade Supreme Commander (military)
- Type: Head of state Commander-in-chief
- Residence: Ulaanbaatar
- Appointer: People's Great Khural
- Constituting instrument: Law on Amendments to the Constitution (1990)
- Precursor: Chairman of the Presidium of the People's Great Khural (as head of state)
- Formation: Constitutional amendments: 10 May 1990; 36 years ago; First inauguration: 3 September 1990; 36 years ago
- First holder: Punsalmaagiin Ochirbat
- Final holder: Punsalmaagiin Ochirbat
- Abolished: 12 February 1992; 34 years ago
- Superseded by: President of Mongolia
- Succession: None (Post abolished) (Note: Functions are succeeded by the President of Mongolia after the adoption of a new constitution.)
- Deputy: Vice President

The president of the Mongolian People's Republic (Mongolian: Бүгд Найрамдах Монгол Ард Улсын Ерөнхийлөгч, romanized: Bügd Nairamdakh Mongol Ard Ulsyn Yurönkhiilögch), abbreviated as president of the MPR (БНМАУ-ын ерөнхийлөгч), was the head of state of the Mongolian People's Republic (MPR) from 3 September 1990 to 12 February 1992.

Punsalmaagiin Ochirbat was the only person to occupy this office. The position was abolished and superseded by the President of Mongolia after the ratification of the 1992 Constitution of Mongolia. Ochirbat served as the inaugural holder of the latter position from 1992 until the 1993 presidential election; he was elected to a four-year term in the first presidential direct election.

== History ==
After the 1990 Democratic Revolution, the People's Great Khural amended the Constitution of the MPR, legalized opposition parties, and created the office of the Presidency and the State Little Khural during its session in May 1990. According to the Constitution, the vice president is also the ex officio of the State Little Khural, similar to that of the Vice President of the United States. The first free multi-party elections were held in July 1990.

The newly elected People's Great Khural first convened on September 3 and, during its plenary session, elected the president (MPRP), the vice president (MSDP), the prime minister (MPRP), and the fifty members of the Little Khural from its 430 members. The MPRP nominated Punsalmaagiin Ochirbat, the chairman of the Presidium of the People's Great Khural since March 1990. His nomination was backed by the opposition Mongolian Social Democratic Party and the Mongolian National Progress Party in an indirect vote.

Candidate	Votes	%
Yes Punsalmaagiin Ochirbat (MPRP)	?	88.1%
Not voting	?	11.9%
Source: Sonin.mn

Ochirbat was officially sworn in on 4 September. Later on 13 September, the fifty seats for the newly established Little Khural were allocated through proportional representation of the total party vote. Radnaasümbereliin Gonchigdorj, a member of the Mongolian Social Democratic Party, was appointed vice president to President Ochirbat.

A new constitution fully transitioning Mongolia to a market economy and a representative democracy was ratified by Ochirbat in January and put into effect on February 12. This new constitution abolished the office of the president of the MPR, which was superseded by the office of the president of Mongolia. Ochirbat, therefore, became the only person to ever serve as the president of the MPR and also the inaugural officeholder of the new position.

== Powers ==
According to the amended 1960 Constitution, the president had the powers to:

- Veto legislations and parliamentary motions
- Approve judicial appointments
- Appoint chief judges for the Supreme Court
- Represent the state and the people of Mongolia in foreign relations
- Act as commander-in-chief of the Mongolian People's Army

== Succession ==
The vice president was the first in the Mongolian presidential line of succession, becoming the new President upon the death, resignation, or removal of the president. Furthermore, under the amended constitution, the vice president was the presiding officer of the State Little Khural, the standing legislative body from 1990 to 1992.

== List ==
No.	Portrait	Name (Born-Died)	Term of office			Political party	Election	Vice president	Prime ministers
No.	Portrait	Name (Born-Died)	Took office	Left office	Tenure	Political party	Election	Vice president	Prime ministers
1		Punsalmaagiin Ochirbat (1942–2025)	3 September 1990	12 February 1992 (Note: Office superseded by the President of Mongolia.)	1 year, 162 days	Mongolian People's Revolutionary Party	1990	Office vacant (until 13 September 1990)	Sharavyn Gungaadorj
1		Punsalmaagiin Ochirbat (1942–2025)	3 September 1990	12 February 1992	1 year, 162 days	Mongolian People's Revolutionary Party	1990	Office vacant (until 13 September 1990)	Dashiin Byambasüren
1		Punsalmaagiin Ochirbat (1942–2025)	3 September 1990	12 February 1992	1 year, 162 days	Mongolian People's Revolutionary Party	1990	Radnaasümbereliin Gonchigdorj	Dashiin Byambasüren

== See also ==
- 1990 Mongolian parliamentary election
- 1993 Mongolian presidential election
- President of Mongolia
  - List of presidents of Mongolia
- Constitutions of the Mongolian People's Republic
