= Punsalmaagiin Ochirbat =

1st President of Mongolia from 1990 to 1997

- Пунсалмаагийн Очирбат
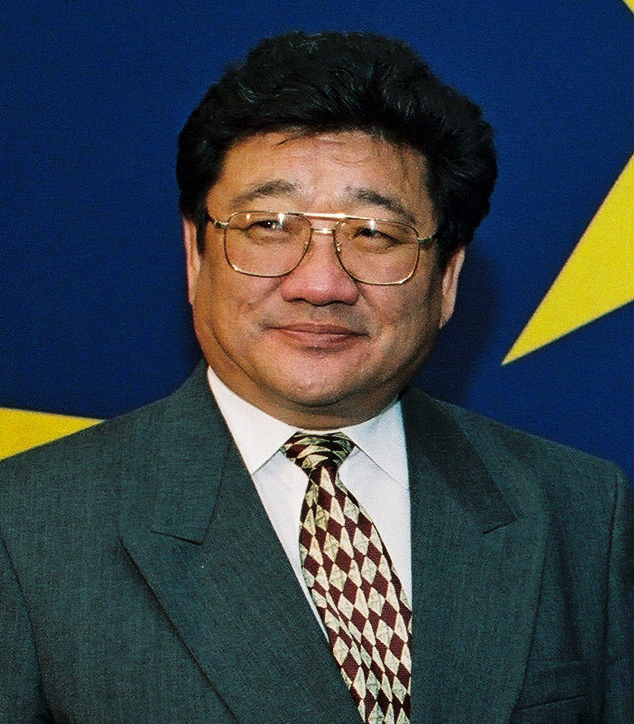
- Ochirbat in 1995

President of Mongolia
- In office 12 February 1992 – 20 June 1997
- Prime Minister: Puntsagiin Jasrai; Mendsaikhany Enkhsaikhan
- Preceded by: Office established
- Succeeded by: Natsagiin Bagabandi

President of the Mongolian People's Republic
- In office 3 September 1990 – 12 February 1992
- Prime Minister: Sharavyn Gungaadorj; Dashiin Byambasüren
- Vice President: Radnaasümbereliin Gonchigdorj
- Preceded by: Office established
- Succeeded by: Office abolished

Chairman of the Presidium of the People's Great Khural
- In office 21 March 1990 – 3 September 1990
- Preceded by: Jambyn Batmönkh
- Succeeded by: Jambyn Gombojav (as chairman of the People's Great Khural); Himself (as president)

Personal details
- Born: 23 January 1942 Tüdevtei, Zavkhan, Mongolian People's Republic
- Died: 17 January 2025 (aged 82) Ulaanbaatar, Mongolia
- Resting place: Altan-Ölgii National Cemetery, Ulaanbaatar, Mongolia
- Party: Mongolian People's Revolutionary Party (1965–1993)
- Spouse(s): Sharavyn Tsevelmaa (m. 1965)
- Children: 2 daughters
- Education: Leningrad Higher School of Mining
- Profession: Mining engineer

Punsalmaagiin Ochirbat (Mongolian: Пунсалмаагийн Очирбат; 23 January 1942 – 17 January 2025) was a Mongolian politician and geologist who served as the first president of Mongolia from 1990 to 1997. A member of the Mongolian People's Revolutionary Party since 1965, he served multiple ministerial positions between 1972 and 1990. In the aftermath of the 1990 Democratic Revolution, he briefly served as Chairman of the Presidium of the People's Great Khural (head of state) from March to September 1990.

Following the country's first multi-party elections, Ochirbat was elected by the People's Great Khural as President of the Mongolian People's Republic in September 1990. As inaugural officeholder, he went onto become the first Mongolian president to be elected by direct popular vote in 1993. During his presidential tenure, he oversaw the drafting of a new constitution, the country's democratization and free market transition.

== Early life and career ==
Ochirbat was born on 23 January 1942 in Tüdevtei, Zavkhan Province. His father is from Govi-Altai Province. He adopted his mother's name, "Punsalmaa," after his father died in 1947. From 1951 to 1960, he attended school in the capital city, Ulaanbaatar, and then studied at the Leningrad Higher School of Mining, graduating in 1965 with a degree in mining engineering. That same year, he returned to Ulaanbaatar and joined the Mongolian People's Revolutionary Party (MPRP).

In 1967, Ochirbat was named Chief Engineer at the Sharyn Gol coal mine in Darkhan-Uul Province before becoming Deputy Minister of Mining and Geology in 1972. In 1976, he became a deputy in the People's Great Khural, a member of the MPRP Central Committee, and was concurrently promoted to full Minister of Mining and Geology. In 1985, he was appointed Chairman of the State Commission for Foreign Economic Relations and then became Minister of Foreign Economic Relations and Supplies when the commission was elevated to ministry status in 1987.

=== 1990 democratic revolution ===
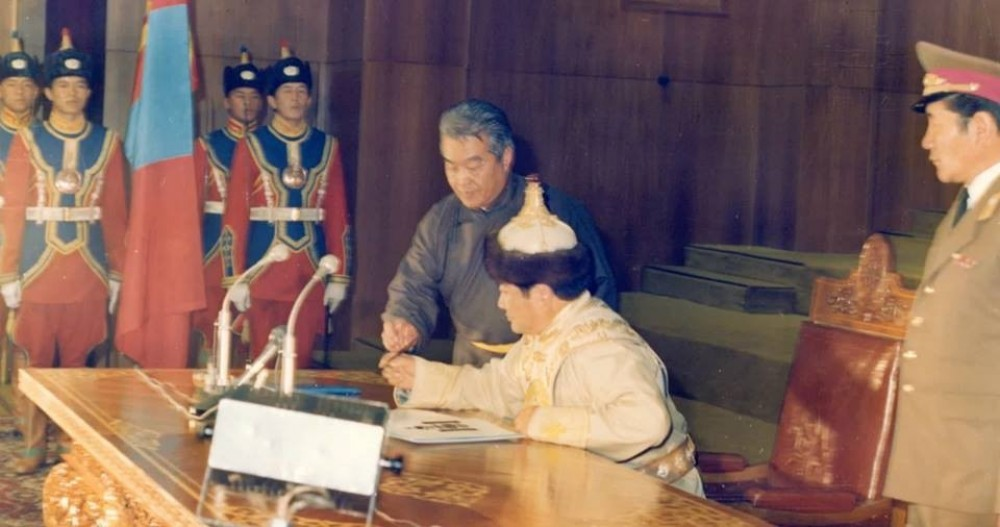
President Ochirbat ratifying the Constitution of Mongolia in January 1992.

Ochirbat was named Chairman of the Presidium (titular head of state) of the People's Great Khural on 21 March 1990 following the resignation of Jambyn Batmönkh and the entire politburo in the wake of the 1990 Democratic Revolution. He was re-elected to the People's Great Khural in the 1990 parliamentary elections and then chosen by majority of the legislature for the newly established post of President of the Mongolian People's Republic on 3 September 1990. He officially swore oath the next day.

After the adoption of the 1992 Constitution, the country was renamed to Mongolia and presidential title to "President of Mongolia and Commander-in-Chief of the Armed Forces". The new constitution also set new presidential elections, the first to be decided by direct popular vote, for the following year, 1993.

== Presidency (1990–1997) ==
Although Ochirbat strongly advocated policies of rapid national revitalization and economic reform to break the country from its socialist past and adopt capitalism by the year 2000, he had a reputation for flexibility and willingness to compromise, and his persuasiveness helped diffuse confrontations and political crises in the lead up to the first presidential elections in June 1993.

=== 1993 presidential election ===
Ideological splits within the MPRP led the party leadership to reject Ochirbat as their presidential candidate and instead nominate intelligentsia Lodongiin Tüdev, editor in chief of the party organ, Ünen (lit. "Truth"). Subsequently, the opposition coalition between the Mongolian National Democratic Party and Mongolian Social Democratic Party nominated Ochirbat as their joint presidential candidate.

On 6 June 1993, Ochirbat soundly defeated Tudev, winning 57.8 percent of the vote to become the first president ever elected by popular vote in Mongolian history.

=== President of Mongolia (1993–1997) ===
Ochirbat's term in office was beset by a series of political and economic crises. By the end of 1993, Ochirbat had become a harsh critic of government's failure to address the country's worsening economic situation. The country suffered food and energy shortages and high inflation. Ochirbat accused the government of not meeting its social welfare obligations. He was also critical of the Mongolian Intelligence services for failing to prevent the rise of transnational organised crime in Mongolia. He blamed over burdensome local and central bureaucracies for blocking faster economic improvement and called for reducing the overall size of the bureaucracy and speeding up privatization of government owned assets. By 1995 only 19.2% of economy had been privatised. He still was sceptical of privatization and thought it could hurt the poor.

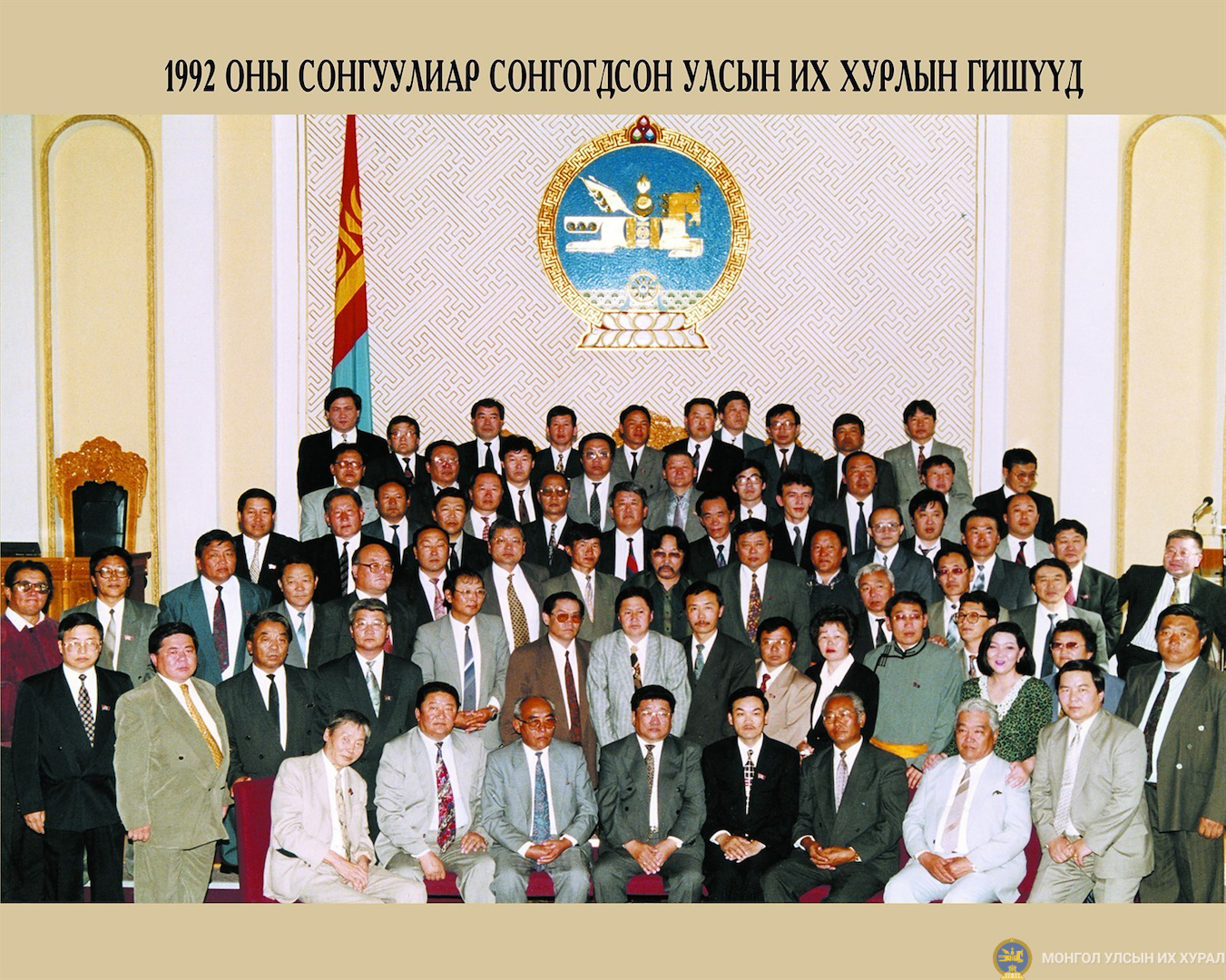
President Ochirbat (at the front center) with members of the first session of the State Great Khural elected in 1992

When in March 1994 opposition parties withdrew from parliament, Ochirbat publicly called for a protection of the rights of the minority parties and accused the ruling MPRP of exploiting the media to their advantage by limiting press coverage of parliament. He also supported reforms to election law to open elections to all parties in advance of parliamentary elections in 1996. In 1994, he vetoed a parliamentary decree to promote Cyrillic script in Mongolia and delay introduction of classical script.

==== Foreign policy ====
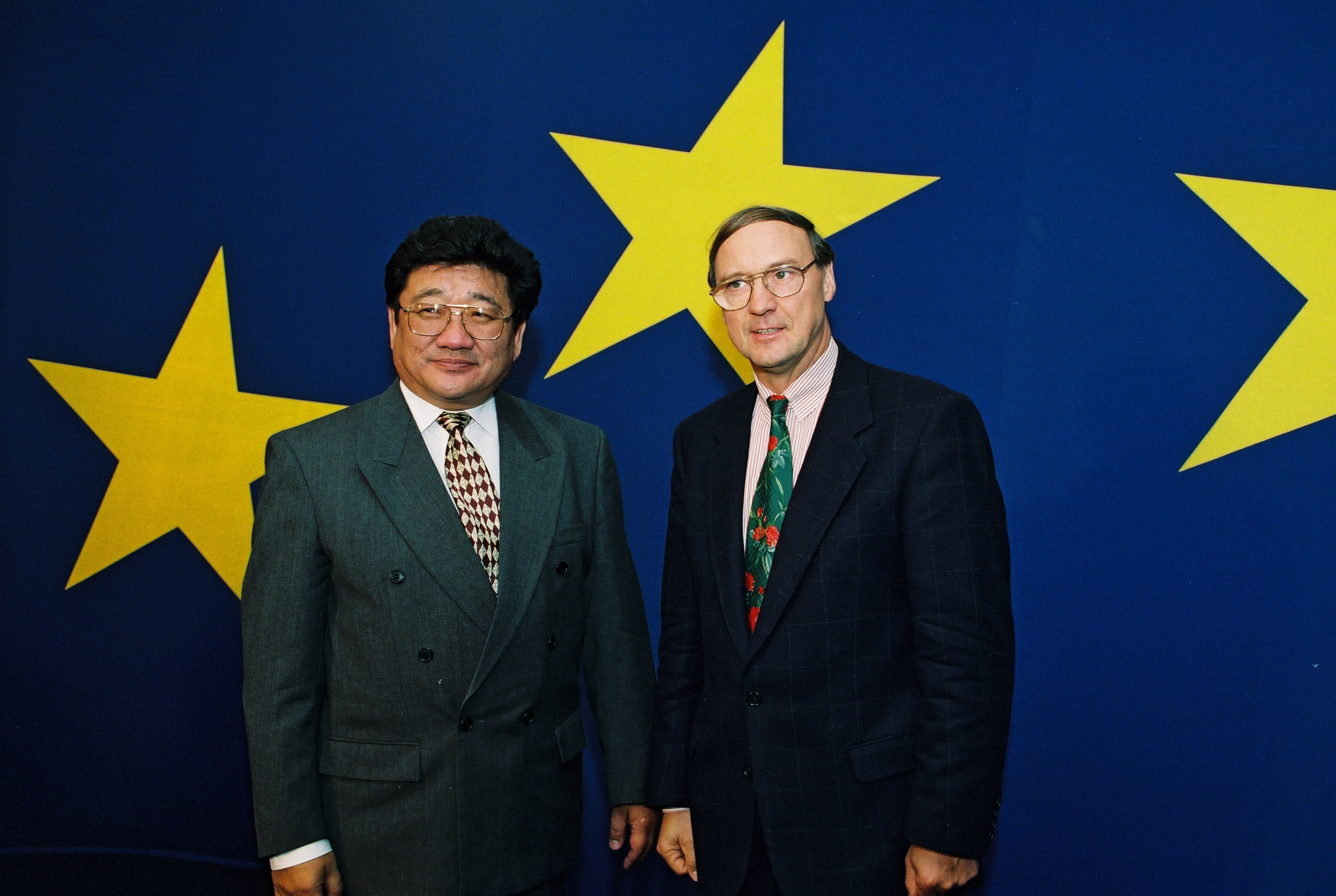
President Ochirbat with European Commissioner for Competition Karel Van Miert during his 1995 visit to the European Commission in Brussels

In foreign affairs, Ochirbat called for a re-orientation of Mongolian foreign policy to broaden international cooperation with all nations, especially with Mongolia's neighbours China and Russia. Ochirbat was the first Mongolian leader ever to officially visit the United States as well as the first Mongolian head of state (as chairman of the presidium) in 30 years to visit Beijing, although relations with China suffered in autumn of 1995 when workers at the Mongolian embassy in Beijing discovered electronic bugs that had presumably been in place more than 10 years.

He rejected the transport and stationing of weapons of mass destruction in Mongolia, and declared the country a nuclear-free zone during the 47th session of the United Nations General Assembly in September 1992.

In 1994, Ochirbat undertook official visits to South and Southeast Asia, signed cooperation agreements with India and Laos, and obtained financial assistance from Thailand to address the food shortage crisis. Later in 1997, he made official visits to Oceania, becoming the first president to visit Indonesia, Australia, and New Zealand.

==== International trips as head of state ====
List of foreign visits by Punsalmaagiin Ochirbat
Date	Country	City	Type of visit/Reason for visit
4–7 May 1990	China	Beijing	State visit
14 May 1990	USSR	Moscow	Working visit
November 1990	Japan	Tokyo	Enthronement of Emperor Akihito
15 November 1990	China	Beijing	Working visit
22–26 January 1991	United States	Washington, D.C.	Working visit
21–25 October 1991	South Korea	Seoul	State visit
25–28 September 1992	United States	New York City	47th session of the United Nations General Assembly
19–20 January 1993	Russia	Moscow	State visit
21–25 February 1994	India	New Delhi	State visit
28 February–2 March 1994	Laos	Vientiane	State visit
4 March 1994	Thailand	Bangkok	State visit
9 May 1995	Russia	Moscow	1995 Moscow Victory Day Parades
25–28 September 1995	Belgium	Brussels	Visit to the European Commission
22–24 October 1995	United States	New York City	50th Anniversary of the United Nations
18–19 April 1996	France	Paris	State visit
21–25 April 1996	United Kingdom	London	State visit
3–5 March 1997	Indonesia	Jakarta	State visit
6–9 March 1997	New Zealand	Auckland	State visit
March 1997	Australia	Canberra	State visit

==== 1997 presidential election ====
Ochirbat ran for a second term in the May 1997 presidential election, but faced a Mongolian public unhappy with the economic dislocation caused by the fast pace of reforms. The country was racked by high unemployment, 30 percent inflation, widespread shortages of foodstuffs and energy supplies and a falling GDP. According to the World Bank, one third of population was living in poverty.

Winning only 29 percent of the vote, Ochirbat lost the election to the chairman of the MPRP, Natsagiin Bagabandi, who had pledged to slow down the government's radical reforms.

== Post-presidency ==
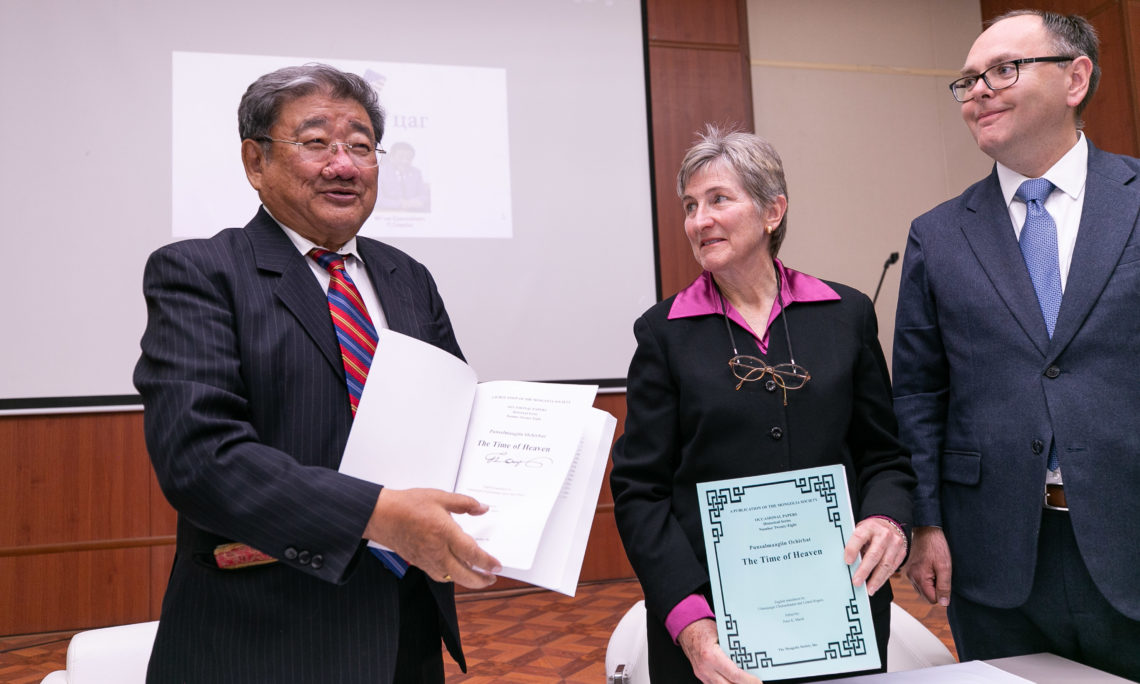
Ochirbat and U.S. Ambassador Pamela J. H. Slutz on 5 October 2018, launching his autobiography "Time of Heaven" in Mongolia

After the election, Ochirbat left Mongolian politics and founded the "Ochirbat Foundation", a non-profit, non-governmental organisation that focused on poverty alleviation and self-sufficiency, environmental, and education programs.

In 2000, he became Director of the Center for Ecology and Sustainable Development at Mongolian University of Science and Technology.

On 24 June 2005, a presidential decree by outgoing president Natsagiin Bagabandi awarded Ochirbat the Order of Chinggis Khaan, the highest state honor of Mongolia, in recognition of his achievements and contributions as leader. The award was presented to Ochirbat, the first ever recipient, by newly elected president Nambaryn Enkhbayar in July. Upon receiving the award, Ochirbat expressed his gratitude to the Mongolian people for their support and resilience during a time of change.

On 28 September 2005, he was appointed Member of the Constitutional Court of Mongolia and re-appointed in 2010.

== Personal life and death ==
Ochirbat was married to Sharavyn Tsevelmaa in Leningrad in 1965. They had two daughters, Ochirmaa and Oyumaa.

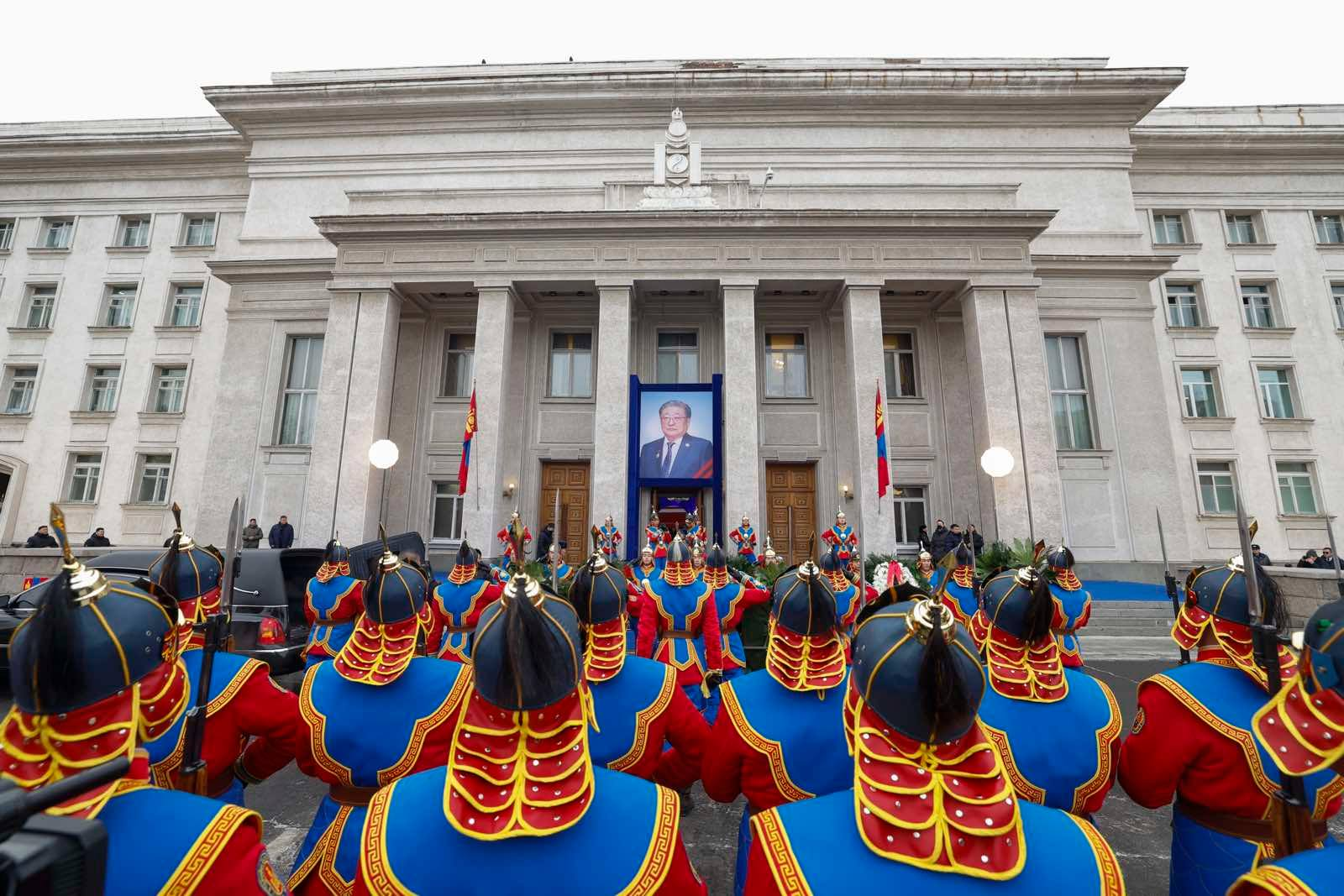
State funeral ceremony of Ochirbat at the Government Palace on 24 January 2025

Ochirbat died on 17 January 2025, at the age of 82. He was survived by his wife, Tsevelmaa, and their two daughters. Following his death, on January 22, Mongolia’s then-incumbent sixth president, Ukhnaagiin Khurelsukh, issued a decree declaring a period of national mourning from January 24 to January 25. During the period, national flags were flown at half-mast, and all public arts, sports, and cultural events were suspended.

The state funeral for the late president was held on the morning of January 24 at the Government Palace. Ochirbat buried at the Altan-Ölgii National Cemetery later that same day.

== Awards and honors ==
Ochirbat was the recipient of several awards and medals, including; Order of Chinggis Khaan, Order of the Polar Star, Honoured medal of labour, Medal of the 50th, 60th, 80th anniversary of the People's Revolution, Medal of Military Force, Medal of the 800th Anniversary of the foundation of the Great Mongolian State, and Medal of the 20th Anniversary of the Democratic Revolution.

=== National awards ===
- Mongolian People's Republic: Medal "50 Years of the Mongolian People's Revolution" (1971)
- Mongolian People's Republic: Order of the Polar Star (1972)
- Mongolian People's Republic: Medal "60 Years of the Mongolian People's Revolution" (1981)
- Mongolia: Medal "80 Years of the Mongolian People's Revolution" (2001)
- Mongolia: Order of Chinggis Khaan (2005)
- Mongolia: State Prize (6 July 2022)

=== Foreign awards and honors ===
- USSR: "Honorary Miner" of the USSR
- USSR: Miner's Glory Medal, 1st class
- USSR: Miner's Glory Medal, 2nd class
- USSR: Miner's Glory Medal, 3rd class
- USSR: "Honored Power Engineer" of the USSR
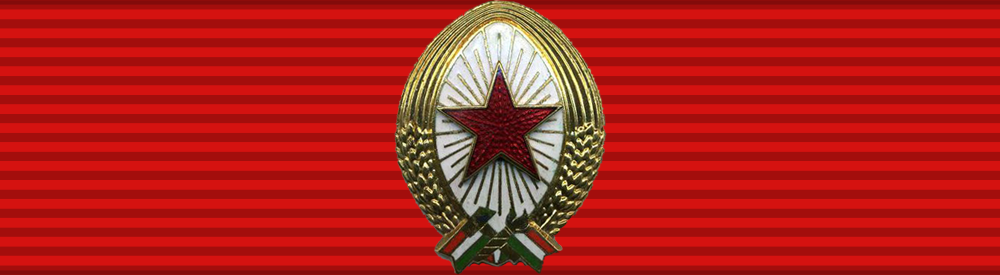
- Hungarian People's Republic: Order of Merit of Labour
- South Korea: Grand Order of Mugunghwa (1991)

Political offices
Preceded by Jambyn Batmönkh	President of Mongolia; 3 September 1990 – 20 June 1997	Succeeded by Natsagiin Bagabandi
