= Ulsyn Khevleliin Gazar =

Book publishing company of Mongolia

Ulsyn Khevleliin Gazar (Mongolian: Улсын Хэвлэлийн Газар, "National Publishing House") is a prominent Mongolian publishing house.

== Selected publications ==
- Undaassan Burkhad (The Gods are Thirsty) (1969) by Anatole France
- Naran Togoruu (1972) by Sengiin Erdene.
- Gazar Tenger (1977) by Dorjiin Garmaa
- Igoriin Khoroony Tuuj (1985) by Tsendiin Damdinsüren
- Chuluutai Gazar: Nairuulluud (1986) by Bat-Ochiryn Tömörtogoo
- Olon ulsyn monopoli ba khöröngötnii ediin zasgiin setgelgee (1987) by Vadim Borisovich Buglai
- Goviin Ikh Darkhan Gazar (1990) by Ochiryn Namnandorj
