= 1997 Mongolian presidential election =

- 18 May 1997

Majority of the popular vote needed to prevent a run-off
- Registered: 1,155,228
- Turnout: 85.06% (▼7.67pp)
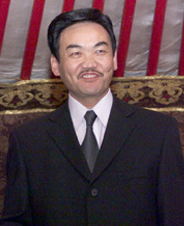

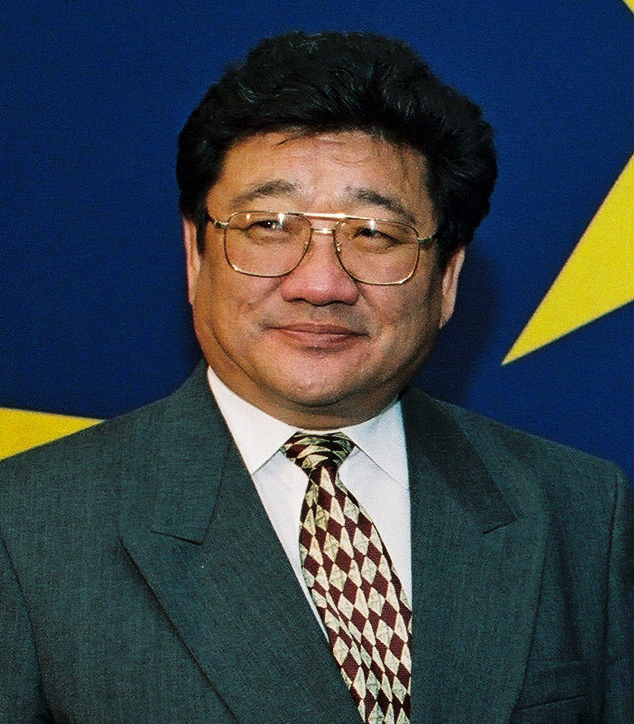
Nominee	Natsagiin Bagabandi	Punsalmaagiin Ochirbat
Party	MPRP	Democratic Union
Popular vote	597,573	292,896
Percentage	62.53%	30.65%
- Results by province
President before election
Punsalmaagiin Ochirbat
MSDP–MNDP
Elected President
Natsagiin Bagabandi
MPRP

Presidential elections were held in Mongolia on 18 May 1997. The result was a victory for Natsagiin Bagabandi of the Mongolian People's Revolutionary Party, who received 63% of the vote. Incumbent president Punsalmaagiin Ochirbat, who ran from the ruling Democratic Union Coalition (DUC), came in second with 30.65% nationwide, whilst the third-party candidate Jambyn Gombojav from the Mongolian Traditional United Party trailed with only 6.82%.

The 1997 presidential election is Mongolia's first-ever three-way presidential race. Voter turnout was 85%, a 7% drop from the previous election. The election of Bagabandi was described as a protest vote against the rapid economic reforms of the DUC government.

== Background ==
In the 1996 parliamentary election, the opposition Democratic Union Coalition (DUC), comprising the Mongolian Social Democratic Party and the Mongolian National Democratic Party, won 50 of the 76 seats in the State Great Khural. The Mongolian People's Revolutionary Party (MPRP), for the first time in its 75-year-long rule, was out of power, both from the executive and legislative bodies.

Many in the public came to view the cause of the MPRP's downfall as stemming from the party's lack of firm policies towards Mongolia's political problems or its foreign relations. DUC candidates, on the other hand, put forward a more specific agenda, vowing to focus on the privatization of state-owned organizations, the establishment of pension plans, the increase in teacher salaries, and a strong emphasis on Western bilateral ties — primarily with the United States, which the coalition called Mongolia's "third neighbor."

However, these reforms received mixed reactions upon implementation. Prime Minister Mendsaikhany Enkhsaikhan's cabinet oversaw a period of rising unemployment and inflation.

== Candidates ==
Names	Born	Last position	Party
Punsalmaagiin Ochirbat	23 January 1942 (55); Tüdevtei, Zavkhan, Mongolia	Incumbent President of Mongolia (1990–1997)	Democratic Union Coalition
Natsagiin Bagabandi	22 April 1950 (47); Yaruu, Zavkhan, Mongolia	Chairman of the MPRP (1997); Chairman of the State Great Khural (1992–1996)	Mongolian People's Revolutionary Party
Jambyn Gombojav	1941 (56); Asgat, Sükhbaatar, Mongolia	Chairman of the People's Great Khural (1990–1992)	Mongolian Traditional United Party

== Results ==
Candidate	Party	Votes	%
Natsagiin Bagabandi	Mongolian People's Revolutionary Party	597,573	62.53
Punsalmaagiin Ochirbat	Democratic Union Coalition	292,896	30.65
Jambyn Gombojav	Mongolian Traditional United Party	65,201	6.82
Total		955,670	100.00
Valid votes		955,670	97.26
Invalid/blank votes		26,970	2.74
Total votes		982,640	100.00
Registered voters/turnout		1,155,228	85.06
Source: General Election Commission
