= Zanabazar (novel) =

Novel by Sengiin Erdene

Zanabazar or Dzanabadzar (Mongolian: Занабазар) is a 1989 novel by Mongolian author, Sengiin Erdene. It has been described as one of the "most popular historical novels of its period" in Mongolia.
