= Naran Togoruu =

1972 novel by Sengiin Erdene

Naran Togoruu (Mongolian: Наран тогоруу Sun Cranes) is a novel by Mongolian author Sengiin Erdene. It was first published in 1972 by Ulsyn Khevleliin Gazar.
