= Vice President of the Mongolian People's Republic =

Former political position in Mongolia

- Бүгд Найрамдах Монгол Ард Улсын; Дэд ерөнхийлөгч
- State emblem of the Mongolian People's Republic
- Style: Mr. Vice President (informal)
- Status: Second highest executive branch office Chairman of the State Little Khural
- Appointer: People's Great Khural
- Formation: 13 September 1990; 36 years ago
- First holder: Radnaasümbereliin Gonchigdorj
- Final holder: Radnaasümbereliin Gonchigdorj
- Abolished: 29 July 1992; 34 years ago
- Succession: None (Post abolished) (Note: Functions are succeeded by the Chairman of the State Great Khural.)

The vice president of the Mongolian People's Republic (Mongolian: Бүгд Найрамдах Монгол Ард Улсын Дэд ерөнхийлөгч, romanized: Bügd Nairamdakh Mongol Ard Ulsyn Ded yurönkhiilögch) was the second-highest executive position in the Mongolian People's Republic (MPR) from September 1990 to July 1992. The vice president was the first in the Mongolian presidential line of succession, becoming the new President upon the death, resignation, or removal of the president. Furthermore, according to the amended 1960 constitution, the vice president was the presiding officer of the State Little Khural, the standing legislative body from 1990 to 1992.

The position was filled by a vote in the State Little Khural at the same time as the President of the Mongolian People's Republic. Radnaasümbereliin Gonchigdorj was the only person to occupy this office. Along with the Little Khural, the position was abolished after the ratification of the 1992 Constitution of Mongolia.

== History ==
After the 1990 Democratic Revolution, the People's Great Khural amended the Constitution of the MPR, legalized opposition parties, and created the office of the President of the MPR and the State Little Khuralduring its parliamentary session in May 1990. According to the Constitution, the vice president is also the ex officio of the State Little Khural, similar to that of the Vice President of the United States. The first free multi-party elections were held on 29 June 1990. Fifty seats for the newly established Little Khural were allocated through proportional representation of the total party vote.

The People's Great Khural first convened on September 3 and elected the president (MPRP), the vice president (MSDP), the prime minister (MPRP), and the fifty members of the Little Khural from its 430 members. Radnaasümbereliin Gonchigdorj, a member of the Mongolian Social Democratic Party, was appointed as the vice president and served until the abolishment of the position in 1992.

A new constitution transitioning Mongolia to a market economy and a representative democracy was ratified and put into effect on February 12. This new constitution abolished the office of the vice president and the Little Khural, in favour of a new unicameral legislature called the State Great Khural. Thereby, making Gonchigdorj the first and last person to serve as the vice president of the MPR.

== List ==
No.	Portrait	Name (Born-Died)	Term of office			Political party	Election	President	Ref.
No.	Portrait	Name (Born-Died)	Took office	Left office	Time in office	Political party	Election	President	Ref.
1		Radnaasümbereliin Gonchigdorj (born 1953)	13 September 1990	29 July 1992	1 year, 320 days	Mongolian Social Democratic Party	1990	Punsalmaagiin Ochirbat (1990–1997)	

== See also ==
- State Little Khural
- 1990 Mongolian parliamentary election
- 1993 Mongolian presidential election
- President of Mongolia
  - List of presidents of Mongolia
- Constitutions of the Mongolian People's Republic
