= Binder, Khentii =

District in Khentii Province, Mongolia

Coordinates: 48°37′01″N 110°36′18″E

Binder District Биндэр сум ᠪᠢᠨᠳᠦᠷᠰᠤᠮᠤ
- District
- Seal

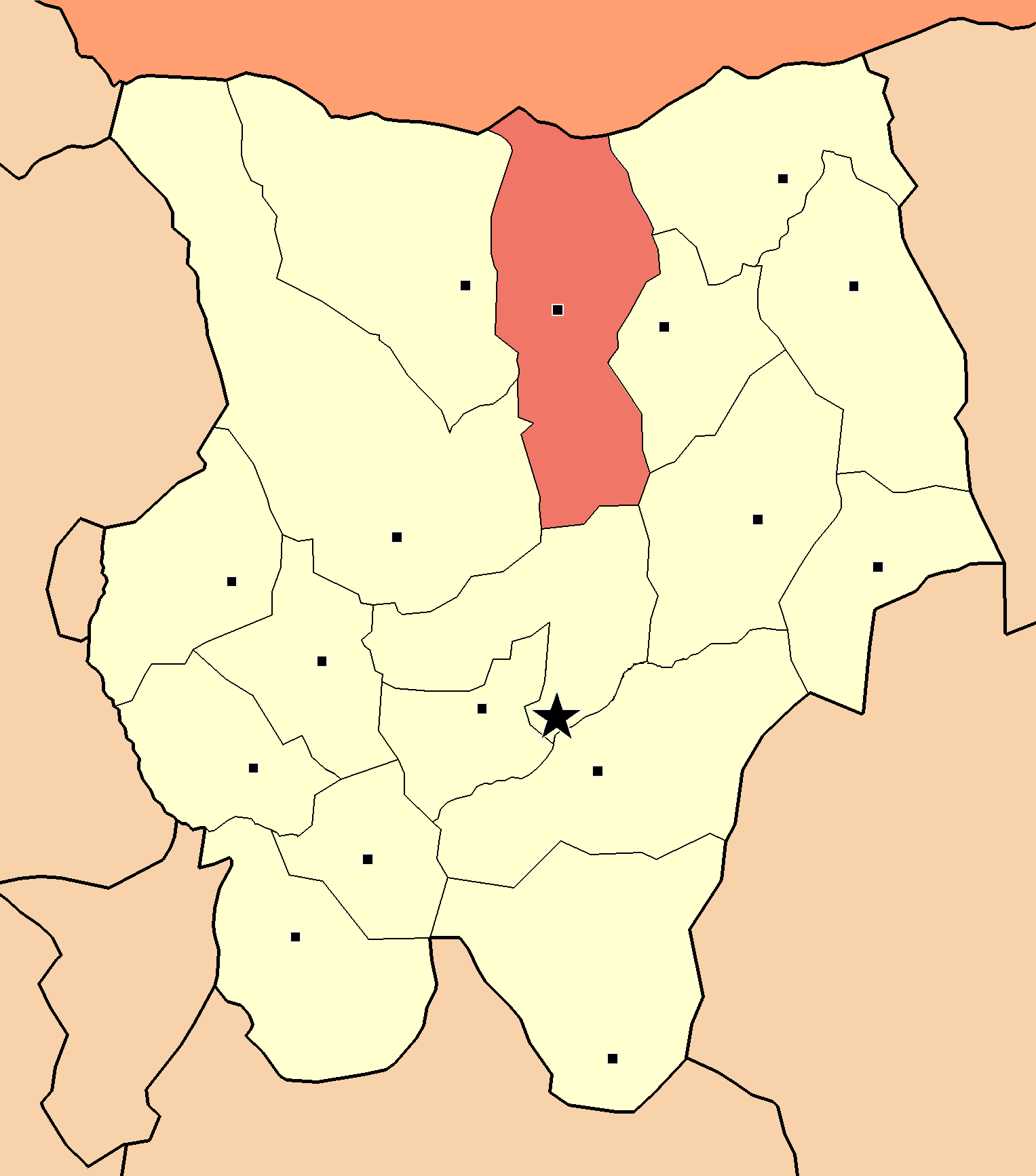
- Binder District in Khentii Province
- Country: Mongolia
- Province: Khentii Province

Area
  - Total: 5,386 km^{2} (2,080 sq mi)
- Time zone: UTC+8 (UTC + 8)

Binder (Mongolian: Биндэр "Whetstone") is a sum (district) of Khentii Province in eastern Mongolia. It is named after Binder Mountain, a prominent local peak that holds deep spiritual and cultural significance, featuring ancient sacred cairns (Binder Ovoo) tied to the region's nomadic heritage. In 2010, its population was 3,455.

== Administrative divisions ==
The district is divided into five bags, which are:

- Bayan-Undur ( Баян-Өндөр)
- Bayangol (Баянгол)
- Delgerkhaan (Дэлгэрхаан)
- Mandalkhaan (Мандалхаан)
- Onon (Онон)

== Notable natives ==
- Dashiin Byambasüren, Prime Minister of Mongolia
- Sengiin Erdene, novelist and writer
