= Miner's Glory Medal =

Badge of Miner's Glory Знак «Шахтёрская слава»
- Type: Medal
- Country: Soviet Union; Russia
- Established: 1956

Miner's Glory (Russian: Znak shakhtyorskaya slava, Знак «Шахтёрская слава») is an honorary badge introduced in the Soviet Union in 1956 and continued in Russia. It is an award for the labour achievements of the workers in the mining industry and in some cases, for supporting work (new technologies, fight with disasters, work in adjacent industries, etc.)

It is issued in three degrees: the 1st degree, 2nd degree and the 3rd degree.
