= Sharavyn Gungaadorj =

Mongolian politician

- Шаравын Гунгаадорж
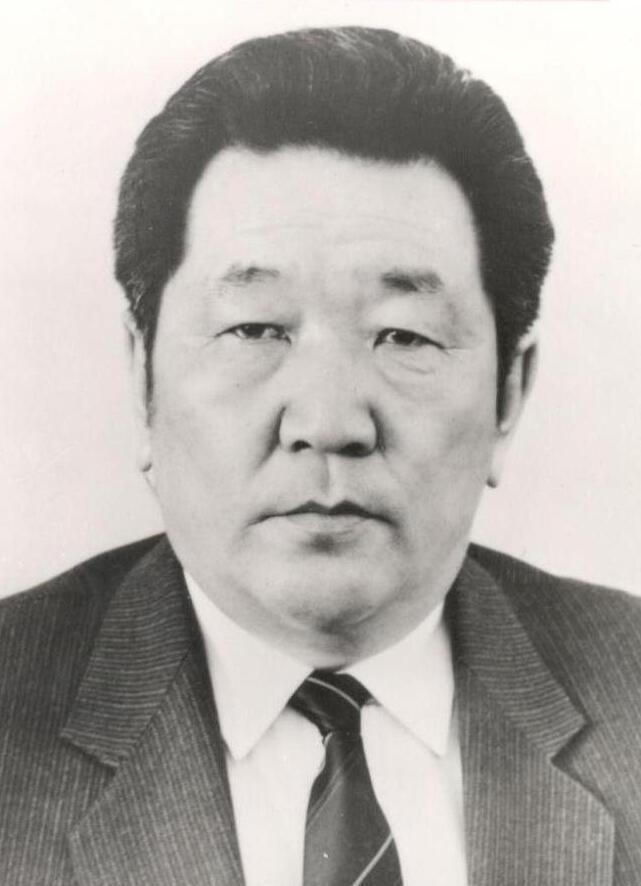
- Gungaadorj in 1990

15th Prime Minister of Mongolia
- In office 21 March 1990 – 11 September 1990
- General Secretary: Gombojavyn Ochirbat
- President: Punsalmaagin Ochirbat
- Preceded by: Dumaagiin Sodnom
- Succeeded by: Dashiin Byambasüren

Member of the State Great Khural
- In office 2000–2004
- Constituency: 33th, Selenge Province

Personal details
- Born: 2 May 1935 (age 91) Ikhkhet, Dornogovi, Mongolia
- Party: Mongolian People's Party (since 1959)
- Children: 3
- Education: Moscow Timiryazev Agricultural Academy
- Profession: Politician, agronomist
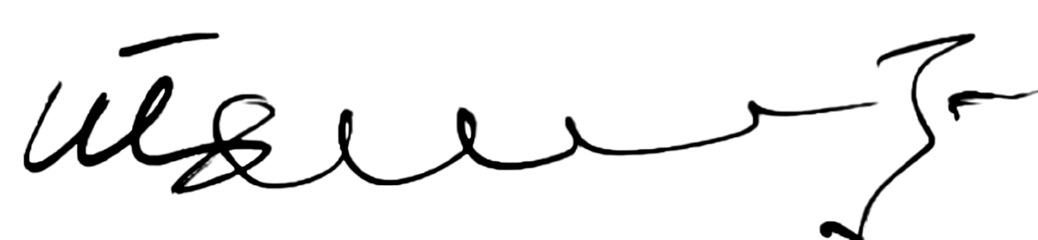
- Signature

Sharavyn Gungaadorj (Mongolian: Шаравын Гунгаадорж; born 2 May 1935) is a Mongolian retired politician and agronomist, who served as the 15th Prime Minister of Mongolia (Chairman of the Council of Ministers) from 21 March to 11 September 1990.

== Life and career ==
Gungaadorj was born in 1935 in the Ikhkhet sum in Dornogovi Province. He graduated from the Russian State Agricultural University in Moscow in 1959. After holding several positions within the Mongolian People's Revolutionary Party (MPRP) Central Committee from 1967 to 1968, he went on to become deputy minister of agriculture. In 1980, he was appointed first deputy minister of state farms and in 1981, he became first secretary of the Selenge Province MPRP Committee. In 1986, he was appointed minister of agriculture.

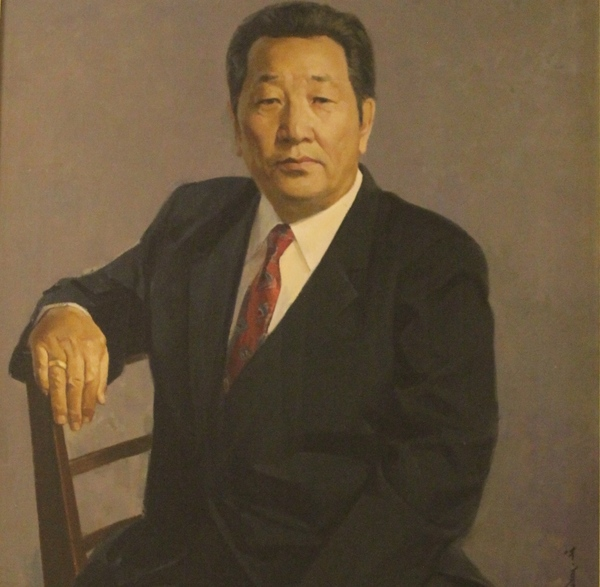
Official painting as prime minister at the Government Palace

From 1987 to 21 March 1990, he served concurrently as deputy chairman of the Council of Ministers and minister of agriculture and food industry. The Politburo and government, including Prime Minister Dumaagiin Sodnom, resigned en masse on 21 March 1990 during the height of the 1990 Democratic Revolution. Consequently, Gungaadorj became the chairman of the Council of Ministers, or Prime Minister, in what was essentially an interim administration before the first free elections could be held the following September. He was succeeded by Dashiin Byambasüren on 11 September 1990. Gungaadorj later served as advisor to the president of the Mongolian People's Republic, Punsalmaagiin Ochirbat, from 1990 to 1991.

In 1992, Gungaadorj was appointed ambassador from Mongolia to the Democratic People's Republic of Korea and later to Kazakhstan.

In the 2000 parliamentary election, Gungaadorj was elected a member of the State Great Khural (parliament) for the 33rd constituency in Selenge Province. As a lawmaker for the MPRP from 2000 to 2004, he also served as the chairman of the Standing Committee on Environment and Rural Development. He did not stand for parliamentary elections in 2004 and in 2009 acted as an advisor to the Minister of Environment and Tourism.

== Personal life ==
Gungaadorj holds a PhD in agricultural sciences, and is a member of the Mongolian Academy of Sciences. He is married and has three children.

Since 1997, Gungaadorj is the managing director of the "Agropro" corporation.

== Sources ==
- Gungaadorj, Sharawyn - Who is who in Mongolian politics (German)
- Sanders, Alan J. K., Historical Dictionary of Mongolia, 1996, ISBN 0-8108-3077-9.

Political offices
| Preceded by Dumaagiin Sodnom | Prime Minister of Mongolia; 1990-03-21 – 1990-09-11 | Succeeded by Dashiin Byambasüren |
