= Naran, Govi-Altai =

Bag in Yesönbulag, Govi-Altai, Mongolia

Naran Наран
- Location in Mongolia
- Coordinates: 46°6′0″N 96°30′0″E
- Country: Mongolia

Naran (Mongolian: Наран) is a district (bag) in Yesönbulag District, Govi-Altai Province of Mongolia, in the Yesönbulag sum to the east of the Aimag-capital Altai City. It is located at 46°6'0N 96°30'0E with an altitude of 2,212 metres (7,260 feet).

== See also ==
- Naran, Sükhbaatar
