= Sengiin Erdene =

Mongolian novelist and writer

- Born: 1929; Binder, Khentii, Mongolia
- Died: 2000 (aged 70–71)
- Education: Mongolian State University; School of Military Officers
- Occupation: Novelist
- Children: Erdeniin Bat-Üül
- Writing career
- Period: 1955; 1949
- Genres: short story, novel
- Notable works: Amidralyn Toirog (Circle of Life); Khoid Nasandaa Uchirna (See You in After-Life)
- Notable awards: State Awards of Mongolia (1965)

Sengiin Erdene (Mongolian: Сэнгийн Эрдэнэ) was a Mongolian novelist and writer.

== Biography ==
Sengiin Erdene was born on December 7, 1929, in Binder, Khentii Province. His father, a herder from Buryatia who had come to Mongolia a few years previous, was killed during the repressions of the late 1930s.

Erdene graduated from the School of Military Officers, Ulaanbaatar in 1949 and the Mongolian State University in 1955. Before turning completely to writing, he worked as a psychiatrist for several years.

Among his most notable works are "Amidralyn Toirog", "Bayan Burd" (Oasis), "Zanabazar", "Malyn Kholiin Toos" (Dust Raised by Livestock), "Naran Togoruu" (Sun Cranes) and "Khoit Nasandaa Uchirna". He was awarded with the State Awards of Mongolia in 1965, the Awards of the Mongolian Writers' Union in 1976 and the title of People's Writer of Mongolia in 1994.

Several of Erdene's works have been translated into German.

Sengiin Erdene died in 2000. One of his sons is Erdeniin Bat-Üül, a prominent politician from Mongolia's Democratic party.

== Sources ==
Renate Bauwe: Leben und Werk des mongolischen Schriftstellers Sengijn Erdene (in German)
