= Tüdevtei, Zavkhan =

District in Zavkhan Province, Mongolia

Coordinates: 48°59′05″N 96°32′41″E

Tüdevtei District Түдэвтэй сум ᠲᠦᠳᠦᠪᠲᠡᠢᠰᠤᠮᠤ
- District
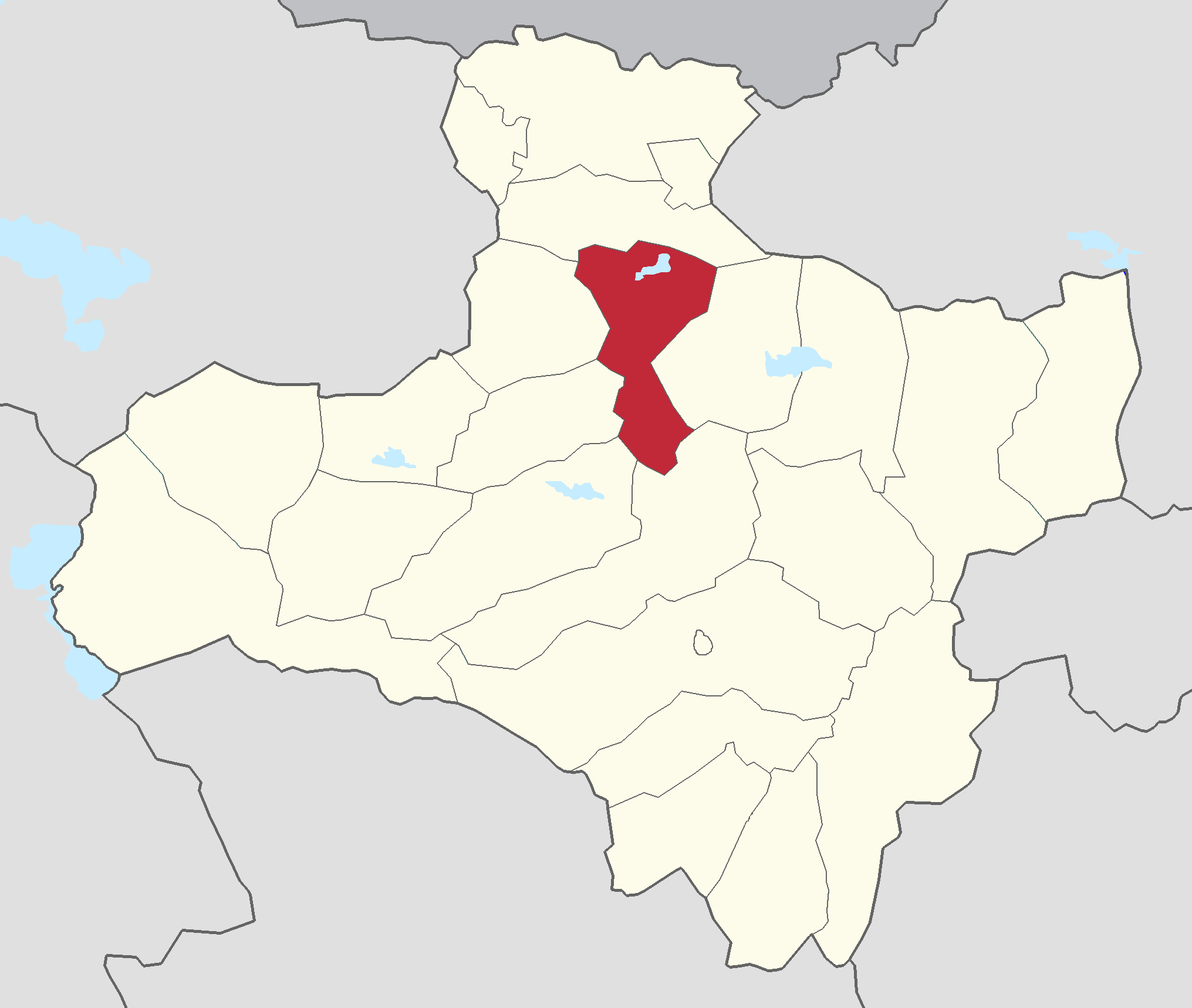
- Country: Mongolia
- Province: Zavkhan Province
- Time zone: UTC+8 (UTC + 8)
- Climate: Dwc

Tüdevtei (Mongolian: Түдэвтэй [ˌtʰʉtɪɸˈtʰe]), also spelt Tüdeutei or Tüdebhtei, is a sum of Zavkhan Province in western Mongolia. Sum centre is 17 km South of Oigon Lake. In 2005, its population was 2,003.

== Administrative divisions ==
The district is divided into five bags, which are:

- Argalant
- Bayantsagaan
- Oigon
- Sharnuruu
- Tsorgo
