= Dashiin Byambasüren =

Mongolian politician

- Дашийн Бямбасүрэн
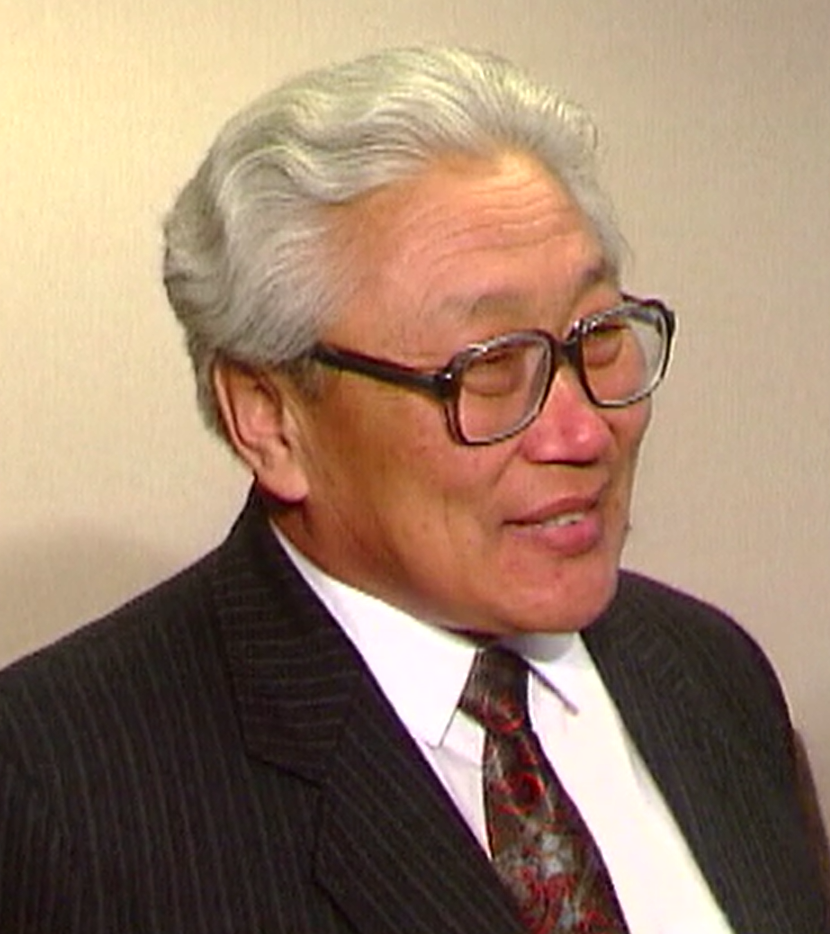
- Byambasüren in 1992

16th Prime Minister of Mongolia
- In office 11 September 1990 – 21 July 1992
- President: Punsalmaagiin Ochirbat
- General Secretary: Gombojavyn Ochirbat; Büdragchaagiin Dash-Yondon
- Preceded by: Sharavyn Gungaadorj
- Succeeded by: Puntsagiin Jasrai

Member of the State Great Khural
- In office 1992
- Succeeded by: Chimedtserengiin Gan-Ölzii
- Constituency: 18th, Khentii Province

Personal details
- Born: 20 June 1942 (age 84) Binder, Khentii, Mongolia
- Party: Mongolian People's Revolutionary Party (until 1992); Mongolian Democratic Renaissance Party (1992–2000)
- Children: 6
- Education: Moscow Higher School of Economics
- Profession: Politician, economist
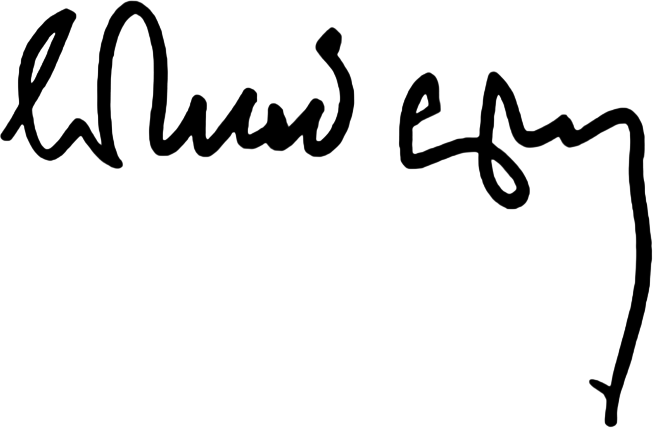
- Signature

Dashiin Byambasüren (Mongolian: Дашийн Бямбасүрэн; born 20 June 1942) is a Mongolian former politician who was Prime Minister of Mongolia from 11 September 1990 to 21 July 1992, the first one to be appointed by a democratically elected parliament, as a member of the Mongolian People's Revolutionary Party. He comes from a Buryat background. He is married with six children.

== Political career ==
An economist, Byambasüren served as the chief of the State Statistical Office and the Institute of Management, although his influence initially waned after the fall of his mentor Jambyn Batmönkh. By 1989 he had risen to the position of deputy head of the Council of Ministers and after the 1990 elections (which were largely democratic) he was chosen as the final Prime Minister of the Mongolian People's Republic. His ministry was noted as reforming but also as something of a technocracy, featuring a number of former communists who had altered their positions to suit the new mood of the country. However he also developed a reputation for diplomacy, visiting Germany, Belgium and France, as well as Moscow and a first visit by a Mongolian leader to China for over thirty years, during the course of his Premiership. He was succeeded in 1992 by Puntsagiin Jasrai. Byambasüren sought to improve Mongolia's external relations and worked particularly closely with Japan, which, along with the World Bank, pledged $320 million to Mongolia under his premiership.

He left the Mongolian People's Revolutionary Party in October 1992, criticizing its continuing hegemony in the country and its close links to communist parties elsewhere and due it's socialism and there anti-reform views. He went on to form his own pro-democracy party, the Mongolian Democratic Renaissance Party (Mongolyn Ardqilsan Särgään Mandalyn Nam), in 1994. His party merged into the Democratic Party in 2000.

== Post-political career ==
Byambasüren was later at the forefront of campaigns to stop archaeologists from digging for the remains of Genghis Khan. Byambasüren attacked both the desecration of sacred ground that the digging caused and the private funding of the initiatives. He has also served as a Professor at the Mongolian Academy of Management and Khan Uul University and President of the Mongolian Development Foundation and participated in the Earth Summit 2002.

Political offices
Preceded by Sharavyn Gungaadorj	Prime Minister of Mongolia; 11 September 1990 – 21 July 1992	Succeeded by Puntsagiin Jasrai
