= List of members of the State Little Khural, 1990–1992 =

1990–1992 State Little Khural
←	None	1992–1996 (State Great Khural)	→

Overview
- Legislative body: State Little Khural
- Jurisdiction: Mongolian People's Republic
- Meeting place: Government Palace; Ulaanbaatar, Mongolia
- Term: 13 September 1990 – 28 June 1992
- Election: 29 July 1990

State Little Khural
- Members: 53: MPRP (33); MDP (13); MNPP (3); MSDP (4)
- Chairman: Radnaasümbereliin Gonchigdorj
- Deputy chairperson: Kinyatyn Zardykhan
- Prime minister: Dashiin Byambasüren
- Party control: Majority of the Mongolian People's Revolutionary Party

The 1990–1992 State Little Khural was the first and only session of the State Little Khural, the lower house of the Mongolian People's Republic. After the 1990 parliamentary election, its members were elected from and by the People's Great Khural (upper house) and assumed office on 13 September 1990. Fifty seats were allocated proportionally according to the total party vote, and three additional seats (chairman, deputy chairman, and secretary) were allocated. Of the Little Khural deputies, approximately 54% belonged to the MPRP and around 40% to other parties, with the average age of the members being a relatively young (39 years).

The first session of the Little Khural convened with 53 members on 13 September 1990. The standing legislature met twice annually in 75-day sessions. After the adoption of Mongolia's modern constitution, the Little Khural transferred its role to the newly elected unicameral State Great Khural on 28 June 1992.

== Composition ==
A coalition government was formed in September 1990 between the three largest parties — the Mongolian People's Revolutionary Party (MPRP), the Mongolian Democratic Party (MDP), and the Mongolian National Progress Party (MNPP).

Party	Seats			Floor leader
Party	Vote	Total	%	Floor leader
Mongolian People's Revolutionary Party	61.3%	33	54.0%	—N/a
Mongolian Democratic Party	24.1%	13	33.3%	—N/a
Mongolian National Progress Party	5.9%	3	3.2%	—N/a
Mongolian Social Democratic Party	5.5%	4	5.5%	—N/a
Totals	–	53	100.0%	

== List of members ==
Number	Member	Year of birth	Party	Great Khural Constituency	Notes
1	Radnaasümbereliin Gonchigdorj	1953	Mongolian Social Democratic Party	56	Vice president and chairman of the Little Khural.
2	Kinyatyn Zardykhan	1940	Mongolian People's Revolutionary Party	4	Deputy chairman of the Little Khural.
3	Byaraagiin Chimid		Mongolian People's Revolutionary Party	396	Secretary general of the Little Khural.
=== Mongolian People's Revolutionary Party ===
4	Ajkhany Bolat		Mongolian People's Revolutionary Party	72	
5	Baataryn Iskra		Mongolian People's Revolutionary Party	99	
6	Gombodorjiin Lkhagvajav		Mongolian People's Revolutionary Party	66	
7	Günchingiin Lkhagvajav		Mongolian People's Revolutionary Party	–	
8	Gendensambuugiin Zuunai		Mongolian People's Revolutionary Party	43	
9	Dagdany Pürev		Mongolian People's Revolutionary Party	261	
10	Danzangiin Lündeejantsan	1953	Mongolian People's Revolutionary Party	15	
11	Dovdongiin Jantsan		Mongolian People's Revolutionary Party	185	
12	Dashdorjiin Dembereltseren		Mongolian People's Revolutionary Party	–	
13	Dogsomjavyn Baldan-Ochir		Mongolian People's Revolutionary Party	150	
14	Dügerjavyn Maam		Mongolian People's Revolutionary Party	–	
15	Jambaldorjiin Urtnasan		Mongolian People's Revolutionary Party	318	
16	Janlavyn Byambajav		Mongolian People's Revolutionary Party	–	
17	Logiin Tsog		Mongolian People's Revolutionary Party	13	
18	Luvsangiin Tsog-Ochir		Mongolian People's Revolutionary Party	274	
19	Navaanperenlein Jantsan		Mongolian People's Revolutionary Party	273	
20	Nyamdolgoryn Sampilnorov		Mongolian People's Revolutionary Party	199	
21	Pandiin Byambatseren		Mongolian People's Revolutionary Party	–	
22	Samdangiin Chuluunbaatar		Mongolian People's Revolutionary Party	132	
23	Sangajavyn Bayartsogt	1967	Mongolian People's Revolutionary Party	288	
24	Sanjiin Bayar	1956	Mongolian People's Revolutionary Party	1	
25	Sarigiin Batchuluun		Mongolian People's Revolutionary Party	–	
26	Tüvdengiin Ochirkhüü		Mongolian People's Revolutionary Party	17	
27	Khüükheegiin Sükhbaatar		Mongolian People's Revolutionary Party	344	
28	Tsedeviin Tovuusüren		Mongolian People's Revolutionary Party	–	
29	Tseveenjavyn Uuld		Mongolian People's Revolutionary Party	235	
30	Chuluuny Tsedendagva		Mongolian People's Revolutionary Party	257	
31	Chültemiin Ayurzana		Mongolian People's Revolutionary Party	236	
32	Khadyn Pürevdagva		Mongolian People's Revolutionary Party	63	
33	Erdenetogtokhyn Altangerel		Mongolian People's Revolutionary Party	28	
34	Yadamsürengiin Yandag		Mongolian People's Revolutionary Party	322	
=== Mongolian Democratic Party ===
35	Bünchingiin Galsandorj		Mongolian Democratic Party	–	
36	Dambiin Dorligjav	1959	Mongolian Democratic Party	–	Deputy chairman of the MDP and Deputy Prime Minister
37	Dambadarjaagiin Chilkhaajav		Mongolian Democratic Party	399	
38	Damdinsürengiin Enkhbaatar		Mongolian Democratic Party	178	
39	Dashjamtsyn Battulga		Mongolian Democratic Party	148	
40	Dashtserengiin Bayartsengel		Mongolian Democratic Party	189	
41	Dogsomyn Ganbold		Mongolian Democratic Party	428	
42	Densmaagiin Damdin		Mongolian Democratic Party	19	
43	Luvsanvandangiin Bold	1961	Mongolian Democratic Party	49	
44	Mendsaikhany Enkhsaikhan	1955	Mongolian Democratic Party	45	
45	Nasyryn Samat		Mongolian Democratic Party	84	
46	Ochiryn Ochirjav		Mongolian Democratic Party	187	
47	Tsakhiagiin Elbegdorj	1963	Mongolian Democratic Party	427	
=== Mongolian National Progress Party ===
48	Davaadorjiin Ganbold	1957	Mongolian National Progress Party	–	Chairman of the MNPP and First Deputy Prime Minister
49	Damdinsürengiin Batsükh		Mongolian National Progress Party	–	
50	Sharyn Shagdarsüren		Mongolian National Progress Party	283	
=== Mongolian Social Democratic Party ===
51	Dondovyn Lamjav		Mongolian Social Democratic Party	39	
52	Ravdangiin Khatanbaatar		Mongolian Social Democratic Party	24	
53	Puntsagiin Ulaankhüü		Mongolian Social Democratic Party	–	
