= Sodnomzunduin Erdene =

Mongolian politician (born 1963)

- Содномзундуйн Эрдэнэ
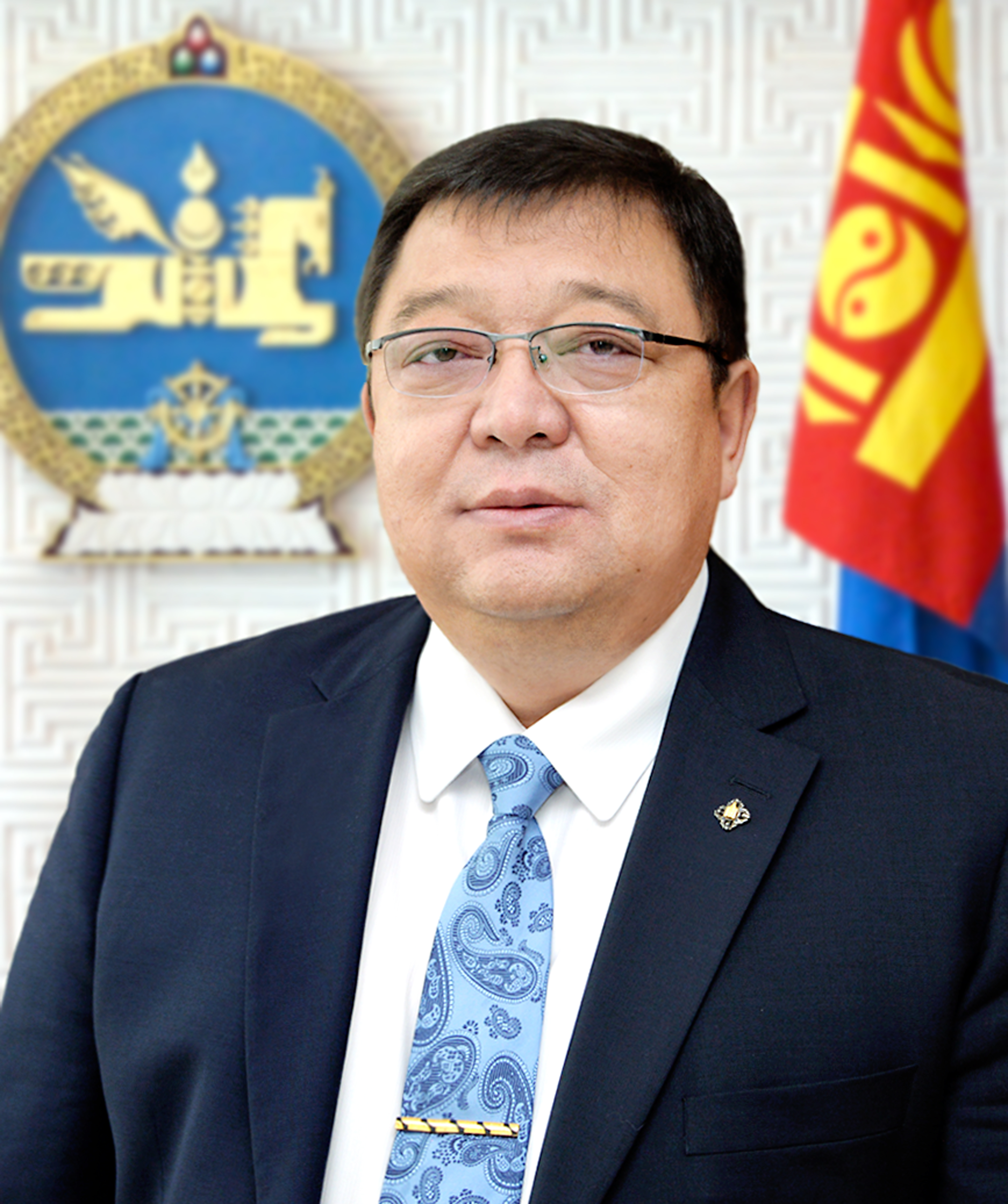
- Erdene in 2019

Minister of Population Development and Social Protection
- In office 18 August 2012 – 7 July 2016
- Prime Minister: Norovyn Altankhuyag; Chimediin Saikhanbileg
- Preceded by: Tugsjargalyn Gandi (Note: as Minister of Social Protection and Labour)
- Succeeded by: Nyamtaishiryn Nomtoibayar (Note: as Minister of Labour and Social Protection)

Chairman of the Democratic Party
- In office 12 February 2017 – 19 January 2023
- Preceded by: Zandaakhüügiin Enkhbold
- Succeeded by: Luvsannyamyn Gantömör

Member of the State Great Khural
- In office July 2008 – 30 June 2020
- Constituency: 69th, Bayangol District (2016–2020); 25th, Bayangol District (2012–2016); 25th, Bayangol District (2008–2012)

Personal details
- Born: 28 July 1963 (age 63) Ulaanbaatar, Mongolia
- Party: Democratic Party (since 2000)
- Other political affiliations: MNDP (1992–2000); Mongolian Democratic Party (1990–1992; 2000)
- Education: Combined Military Higher School; Otgontenger University (LLB & LLM); National Academy of Governance (MPA & PhD)

Sodnomzunduin Erdene (Mongolian: Содномзундуйн Эрдэнэ; born on 28 July 1963) is a Mongolian politician and lawyer who served in a number of high–ranking positions of the Democratic Party during his career. A senior member of the Democratic Party (DP), he was the party chairman from 2017 to 2023 and the party's nominee for the 2021 presidential election, where he received around 6 percent of the popular vote.

Erdene was elected to the State Great Khural three consecutive times — in 2008, 2012, and 2016. He previously served as Minister of Population Development and Social Protection of the Altankhuyag and Saikhanbileg cabinets between 2012 and 2016.

== Early life and education ==
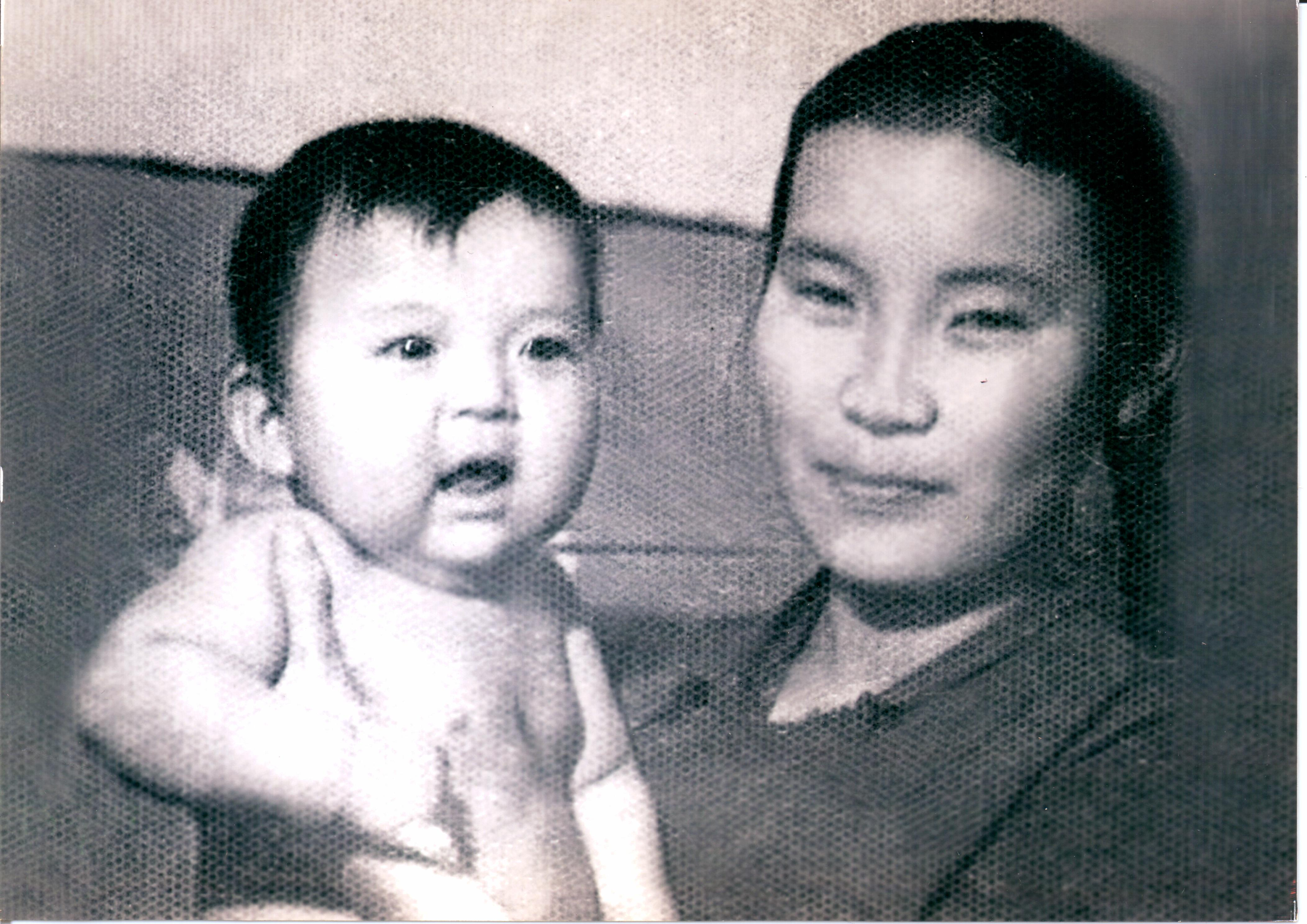
Erdene, as a baby, with his mother, Tsend-Ayush, circa early 1980s

Erdene was born in Ulaanbaatar, the capital of the Mongolian People's Republic, on 28 July 1963. He became the eldest son to Sodnomzundui (father) and Tsend-Ayush (mother).

He completed his secondary education at the 75th secondary school in Ulaanbaatar in 1981. Between 1981 and 1984, he studied as a Military Command and Operations Engineer at the Combined Military Higher School. He didn't conscript to the army.

He graduated Otgontenger University with a Bachelor of Laws in 1998 and Master of Laws in 2000. Erdene also graduated with a Master of Public Administration at the National Academy of Governance the same year. He obtained his PhD of Management at the National Academy of Governance in 2013.

== Political career ==
A member of the opposition Mongolian Democratic Party, Erdene held multiple lower-ranking party roles between 1990 and 1992. He served as the head of the joint headquarters of the MDP and the Mongolian National Progress Party (MNPP) during the 1992 parliamentary election. The two parties merged into the Mongolian National Democratic Party (MNDP) after the election.

Following the foundation of the MNDP, Erdene served as the head of the MNDP committee of Bayangol District in Ulaanbaatar between 1995 and 2000. He served as the governor of Bayangol District and the chairman of the MNDP in Ulaanbaatar when the MNDP-led Democratic Union Coalition (DUC) won a landslide victory in the 1996 elections.

Due to four years of party infighting and cabinet crises, the coalition fractured in late 1999 and early 2000. The long-dissolved MDP was re-founded by Erdene for the 2000 parliamentary election. The party and other former coalition parties obtained few to no seats in the State Great Khural. The MNDP, the MDP, and three other parties merged to form the Democratic Party (DP) in December 2000. Erdene became a senior member of the DP's Executive Council and the National Policy Committee.

In the 2008 parliamentary election, he was elected to the State Great Khural for the first time from the 25th Bayangol constituency.

He was re-elected as a member of parliament from Bayangol in the 2012 parliamentary election. The DP secured half of the total seats and nominated party chairman Norovyn Altankhuyag as prime minister. Erdene was appointed Minister of Population Development and Social Protection by prime minister Altankhuyag in 2012 and re-appointed by prime minister Chimediin Saikhanbileg in 2014.

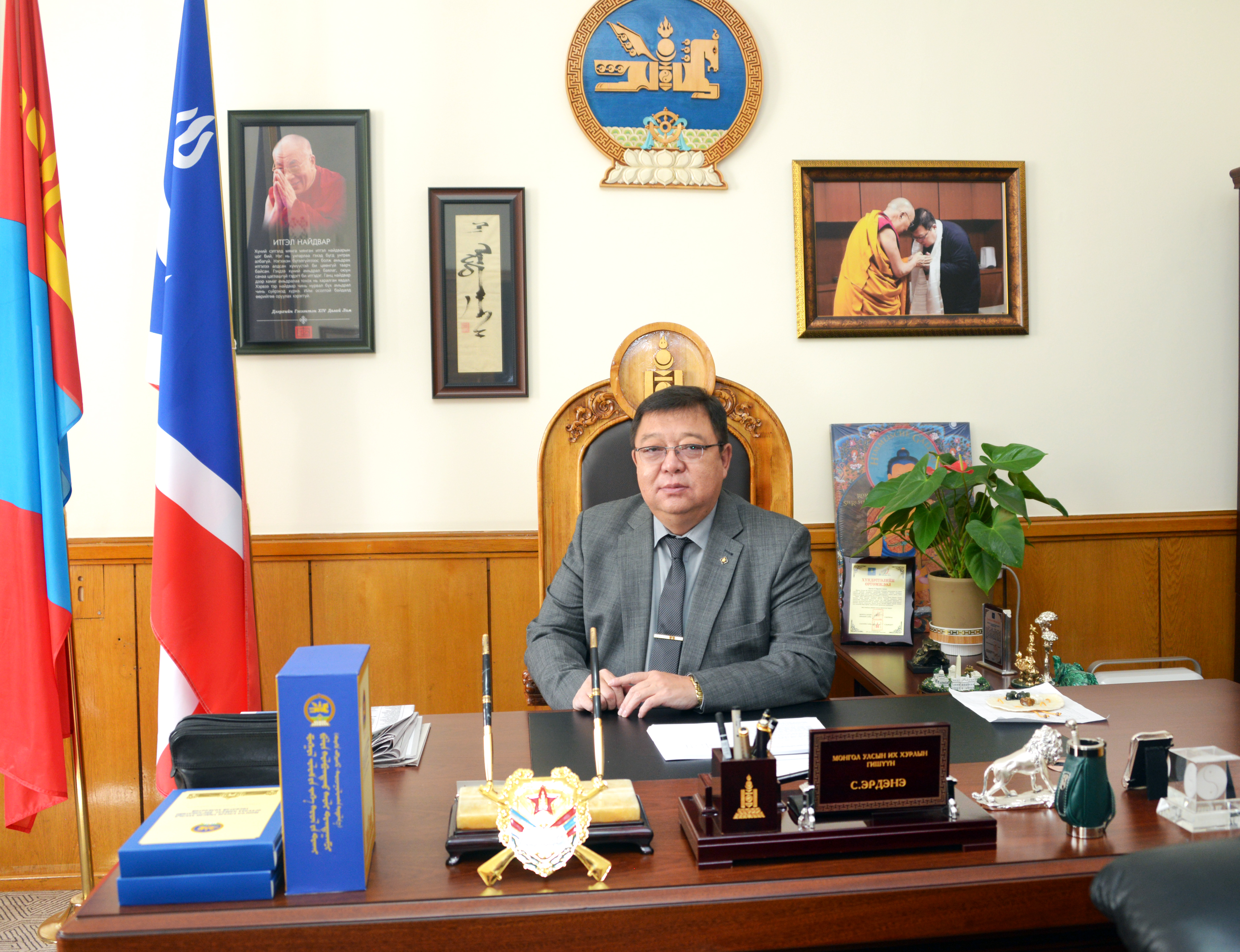
Erdene in his parliamentary office at the Government Palace, 2017

In the 2016 parliamentary election, the DP lost its majority to the Mongolian People's Party. Many of the high-profile DP politicians, including parliamentary speaker and party chairman Zandaakhüügiin Enkhbold, were unseated. Erdene was one of the few DP politicians to be re-elected. He later became the Chairman of the Democratic Party and succeeded Enkhbold on 12 February 2017 after winning an internal party election on 30 January.

=== Party chairmanship ===
He lost a re–election bid in the 2020 parliamentary election and submitted his resignation as party chairman in 2020. However, due to internal political infighting, he remained as party chairman until he was officially succeeded by Luvsannyamyn Gantömör in 2023.

Erdene was the DP’s candidate in the 2021 presidential election, where he received about 6 percent of the national vote.

During his post-chairmanship, he unsuccessfully ran for another parliamentary bid in the 9th Bayangol constituency during the 2024 parliamentary election. Erdene received 15% of the constituency vote, coming in 7th out of 50 candidates overall.

== Diplomatic role ==
On 10 January 2025, Erdene was appointed the Honorary Deputy Consul of Mongolia in Chicago.

== List of high government/party positions ==
- Chairman of the Democratic Party (2017–2023)
- Chairman of the Democratic Party caucus in the State Great Khural (2016–2017)
- Member of the State Great Khural (2008–2012; 2012–2016; 2016–2020)
- Minister of Population Development and Social Protection (2012–2016)
- Chairman of the Democratic Party in the Capital (2005–2011)
- Member of the Citizens' Representatives Khural of the Capital City (2007–2008)
- President of the Mongolian Democratic Union (2003–2007)
- Chairman of the Mongolian Democratic Party (2000)
- Governor of Bayangol District (1996–2000)
