= Rinchinnyamyn Amarjargal =

Prime Minister of Mongolia from 1999 to 2000

- Ринчиннямын Амаржаргал
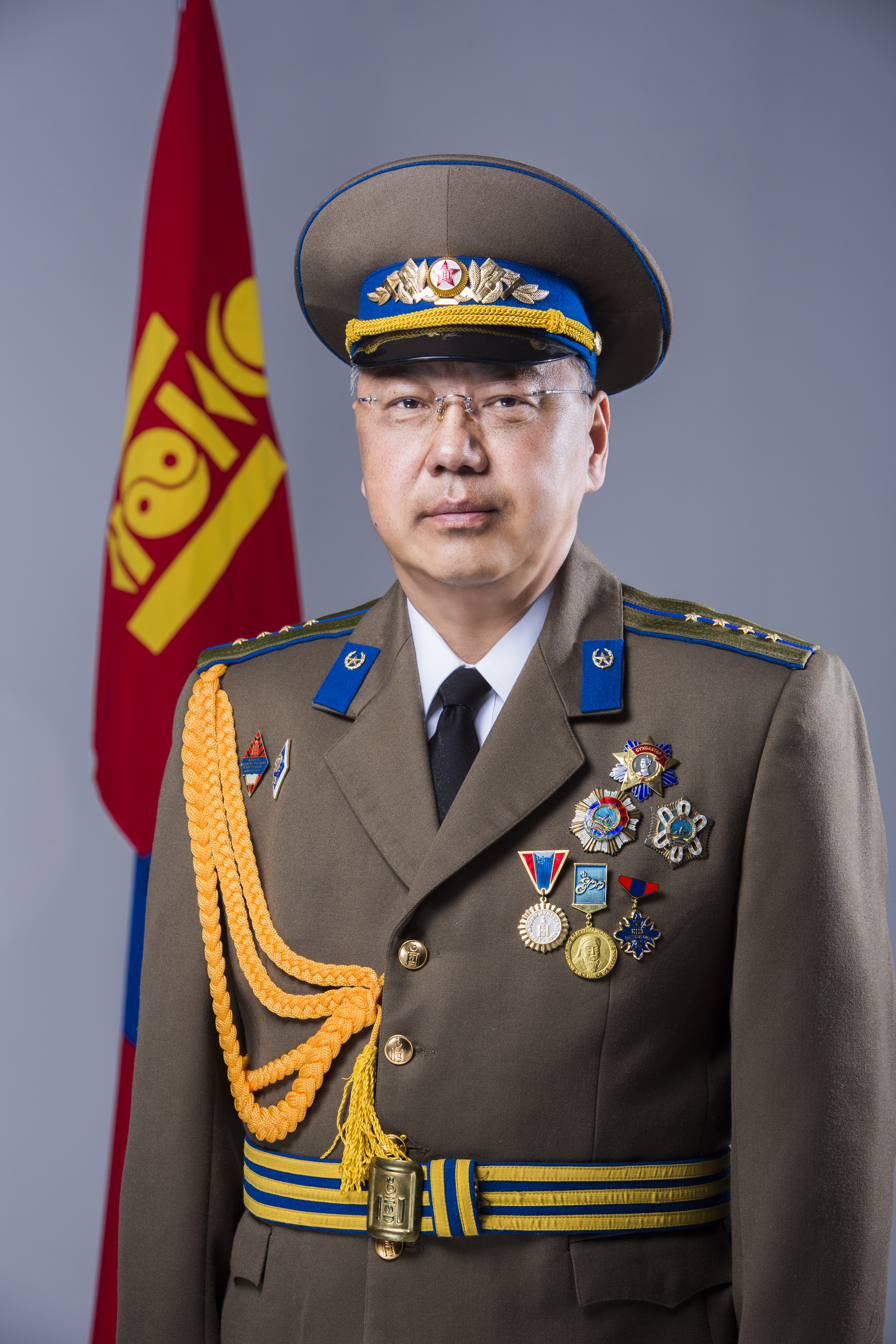
- Amarjargal in 2016

21st Prime Minister of Mongolia
- In office 30 July 1999 – 26 July 2000
- President: Natsagiin Bagabandi
- Preceded by: Nyam-Osoryn Tuyaa (acting)
- Succeeded by: Nambaryn Enkhbayar

Minister of Foreign Affairs
- In office 29 April 1998 – 21 December 1998
- Prime Minister: Tsakhiagiin Elbegdorj
- Preceded by: Shuheriin Altangerel
- Succeeded by: Nyam-Osoryn Tuyaa

Member of the State Great Khural
- In office 2004 – 5 July 2016
- Constituency: 23th, Sükhbaatar district (2012–2016); 16th, Khovd Province (2008–2012); 64th, Bayangol district (2004–2008)
- In office 1996–2000
- Constituency: 64th, Bayangol district

Personal details
- Born: 27 February 1961 (age 65) Ulaanbaatar, Mongolia
- Party: Democratic Party (since 2000)
- Other political affiliations: MNDP (1992–2000); MNPP (1990–1992)
- Education: Plekhanov Institute of National Economy (BA); University of Bradford (MSc); National Intelligence Academy (PhD)
- Profession: Politician, economist
- Website: www.amarjargal.org

Military service
- Allegiance: Mongolian People's Republic
- Branch/service: Mongolian People's Army
- Years of service: 1983–1990
- Rank: Captain

Rinchinnyamyn Amarjargal (Mongolian Ринчиннямын Амаржаргал; born 27 February 1961) is a Mongolian politician and economist who served as the 21st Prime Minister of Mongolia from 30 July 1999 to 26 July 2000. He is a leading member of the Democratic Party.

== Early life and education ==
Amarjargal was born in Ulaanbaatar on 27 February 1961. He is fluent in Mongolian, Russian, and English. He attended the Plekhanov Institute of National Economy in Moscow from 1978 and earned a bachelor's diploma in financial economics in 1982. From 1981 to 1982, he also attended the Evening University for Marxism–Leninism.

After that, Amarjargal worked at the Central Committee of the Confederation of Mongolian Trade Unions. He taught at the Military Institute from 1983 to 1990, where he rose to the rank of captain, and at the Technical University from 1990 to 1991. He worked as a director of the Economic College of Mongolia from 1991 to 1996. From 1994 to 1995, he studied at the University of Bradford in England and graduated with a Master of Science in Macroeconomic Policy and Planning. During his state visit to England in March 2000, the university awarded him an honorary doctorate.

In 2003, Amarjargal was a visiting research fellow at the Institute of Economic Research, Hitotsubashi University in Japan. He completed a doctor's degree in economic security at the National Intelligence Academy, an affiliate of the General Intelligence Agency of Mongolia.

== Political career ==
Amarjargal contributed to the democratic movement in Mongolia from the beginning. He was a founding member of the New Progressive Union and the Mongolian National Progress Party. Then he helped merge the MNPP with the Mongolian Democratic Party to form the Mongolian National Democratic Party (MNDP). As per the latter, he was elected to the State Great Khural (the unicameral parliament) in 1996.

In April 1998, he became Minister of Foreign Affairs under Tsakhiagiin Elbegdorj. In September of the same year, he nearly became prime minister, according to an agreement between the governing Democratic Union Coalition (DUC) and President Natsagiin Bagabandi, who belonged to the opposition Mongolian People's Revolutionary Party, but he was rejected by parliament in a close vote. He then remained as the foreign minister until Elbegdorj's government had to step back in December.

In 1999, Amarjargal became the chairman of MNDP. He was finally designated as the Prime Minister of Mongolia on July 30 of the same year. He remained in office for almost a year, until 26 July 2000, when the former DUC member parties were defeated in the 2000 parliamentary election. While holding office, he had to abandon his seat in parliament because of a Constitutional clause still in force at the time. Following the electoral wipeout in 2000, the MNDP, the Mongolian Social Democratic Party, and other former DUC parties merged to form the Democratic Party (DP).

In 2004, Amarjargal was elected to parliament as an independent candidate. In the 2008 and 2012 parliamentary elections, he was elected to the State Great Khural as a member of the DP. In the 2016 election, Amarjargal gave up his mandate to secure a female parliamentary seat quota for DP.

Amarjargal has voiced his support for the Campaign for the Establishment of a United Nations Parliamentary Assembly, an organisation which campaigns for democratic reformation of the United Nations, and the creation of a more accountable international political system.

== Amarjargal Foundation ==
In 2001, Amarjargal established the Amarjargal Foundation, a non-governmental organization that promotes transparency and an open society and conducts studies on social welfare, economy, politics, and law. It also negotiates foreign help and investment. Since 1991, Amarjargal has been the Chairman of the Board of Trustees of the University of Economics and Finance, one of the leading universities in Mongolia.

Political offices
Preceded by Nyam-Osoryn Tuyaa	Prime Minister of Mongolia; 1999-07-30 - 2000-07-26	Succeeded by Nambaryn Enkhbayar
