= Erdeniin Bat-Üül =

Mongolian politician (born 1957)

- Эрдэнийн Бат-Үүл
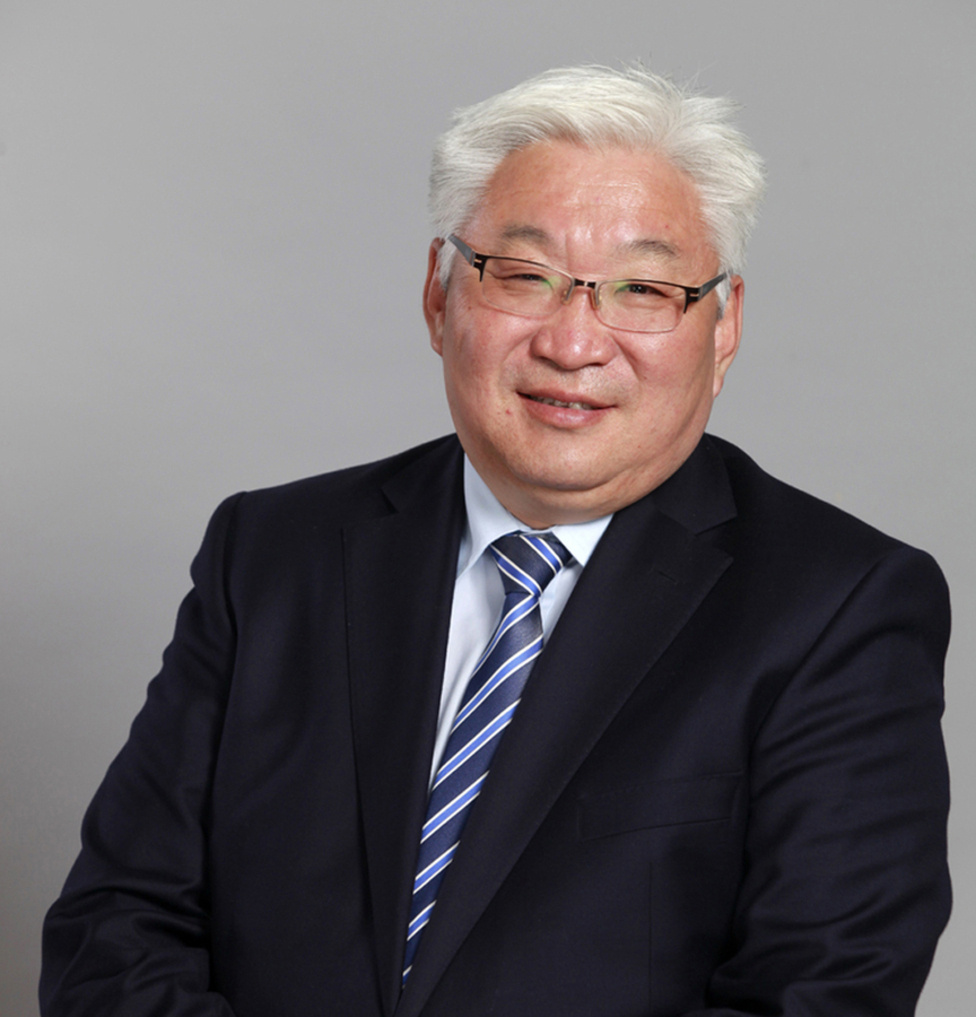
- Bat-Üül in 2015

Mayor of Ulaanbaatar
- In office 7 August 2012 – 7 July 2016
- Preceded by: Gombosurengiin Munkhbayar
- Succeeded by: Sunduin Batbold

Chairman of the Mongolian Democratic Party
- In office 18 February 1990 – 25 October 1992
- Succeeded by: Post abolished (Note: Party merged with the MNPP)

Personal details
- Born: 1 July 1957 (age 69) Ulaanbaatar, Mongolia
- Party: Democratic Party (since 2000)
- Other political affiliations: Mongolian National Democratic Party (1992–2000); Mongolian Democratic Party (1990–1992)
- Spouse(s): Delgertuya (Mongolian: Дэлгэртуяа)
- Education: National University of Mongolia
- Occupation: Physician, Politician

Erdeniin Bat-Üül (Mongolian: Эрдэнийн Бат-Үүл, born 1 July 1957) is a Mongolian politician from the Democratic Party and a former mayor of Ulaanbaatar.

== Early life and career ==
Bat-Üül was born in Ulaanbaatar, the capital city of the Mongolian People's Republic, on 1 July 1957. His father was Sengiin Erdene, one of Mongolia's well-known authors. In 1975, he completed School No.1 of Ulaanbaatar, and in 1981, he graduated from the physics department of the National University of Mongolia. From 1982 to 1985, he worked as a teacher in Renchinlkhümbe, Khövsgöl, and afterwards worked at the Astronomic Laboratory of Mongolian Academy of Sciences in Ulaanbaatar.

== Democratic revolution ==
In 1988, Bat-Üül was part of an underground political group, which would later become the first to articulate dissent against the ruling Mongolian People's Revolutionary Party in December 1989. Shortly afterwards, all members of the group were arrested, but set free again on lack of evidence. Bat-Üül was one of the thirteen leaders of Mongolia's 1990 Democratic Revolution.

== Political career ==
Bat-Üül served as the first and only chairman of the Mongolian Democratic Party from 1990 until its merger with the Mongolian National Progress Party in 1992. Subsequently, he served as the general secretary of the newly-founded Mongolian National Democratic Party from 1992 to 1996. He was elected into the People's Great Khural in 1990, and into the State Great Khural in 1996, 2004 and 2008, representing the Democratic Party (DP) since 2000.

Bat-Üül was awarded with the title of Hero of Mongolia by then president Tsakhiagiin Elbegdorj for his role in the Democratic Revolution on 10 December 2009.

As party leader of the DP branch in Ulaanbaatar, he led the party's first major victory in the municipal elections in 2012. Consequently, he was appointed as Mayor of Ulaanbaatar by the Ulaanbaatar City Council, dominated by the DP, on 7 August 2012. He stepped down as mayor on 7 July 2016, later replaced by Sunduin Batbold from the Mongolian People's Party.

Erdeniin Bat-Üül and Gombojavyn Zandanshatar led the efforts to codify deliberative polling in Mongolia as co-chairs of the Advisory Committee for Deliberative Polling. See Mongolia's Law on Deliberative Polling.

== Awards ==
- Mongolia: Hero of Mongolia (2009)
- Mongolia: Order of Sukhbaatar
- Mongolia: Order of the Red Banner of Labour
