= Zandaakhüügiin Enkhbold =

Mongolian politician (born 1966)

- Зандаахүүгийн Энхболд
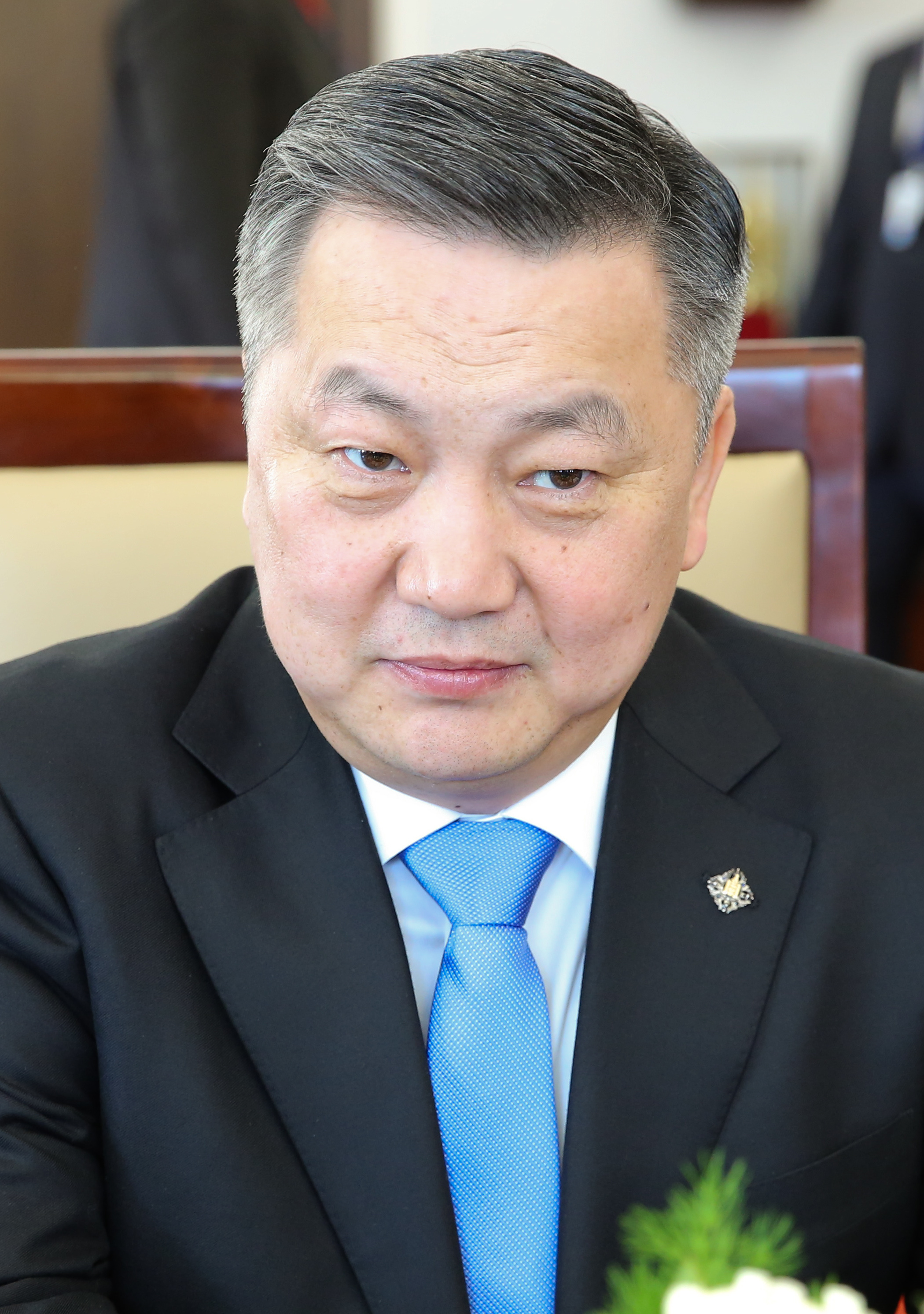
- Enkhbold in 2015

Chairman of the State Great Khural
- In office 24 July 2012 – 5 July 2016
- President: Tsakhiagiin Elbegdorj
- Prime Minister: Norovyn Altankhuyag; Chimediin Saikhanbileg
- Preceded by: Damdiny Demberel
- Succeeded by: Miyeegombyn Enkhbold

Chairman of the Democratic Party
- In office 14 November 2014 – 12 February 2017
- Preceded by: Norovyn Altankhuyag
- Succeeded by: Sodnomzunduin Erdene

Member of the State Great Khural
- In office 2005 – 5 July 2016
- Constituency: Closed list (2012–2016)
- Constituency: 10th, Övörkhangai Province (2008–2012); 24th, Övörkhangai Province (2005–2008)

Personal details
- Born: 23 May 1966 (age 60) Ulaanbaatar, Mongolia
- Party: Democratic Party (since 2000)
- Other political affiliations: Mongolian Social Democratic Party (1990–2000)
- Education: Ural State Technical University; National University of Mongolia; University of Denver
- Website: Official website

Zandaakhüügiin Enkhbold (Mongolian: Зандаахүүгийн Энхболд, born 23 May 1966) is a Mongolian politician who served as the Chairman of the State Great Khural from 2012 to 2016. A member of the Democratic Party, he was thrice elected as a member of parliament in 2005, 2008, and 2012.

Enkhbold served as the party chairman from 2014 to 2016, when the party suffered a major electoral defeat to the Mongolian People's Party. He was unseated from the State Great Khural in the very same election.

== Early life and education ==
Enkhbold was born in Ulaanbaatar, the capital city of Mongolia, on 23 May 1966. He spent his childhood in Selenge Province. He was educated at Ural State University in Russia as an electrical engineer with a concentration on automation and telemetry from 1984 to 1989. Later, he earned a diploma in law from the National University of Mongolia in 1996 and graduated with an IMBA from the University of Denver in 2004.

== Political career ==
Although he joined the pro-democracy movement in late 1989 and the Mongolian Social Democratic Party in 1990, Enkhbold emerged on the political scene in 1996 when he was appointed the Chairman of the State Property Committee, the government agency responsible for the administration of the privatization process in Mongolia.

=== Member of parliament ===
After facing an electoral wipeout by to ex-communist Mongolian People's Revolutionary Party (MPRP) in the 2000 parliamentary election, Enkhbold was elected as secretary-general of the newly founded oppositionDemocratic Party (DP). However, he resigned from his post after the DP lost the 2001 presidential election. Enkhbold assumed his seat in parliament from Övörkhangai Province in 2005. He was one of three sponsors of the controversial Windfall Profits Tax that was abolished when the Mongolian government signed an Investment Agreement for the Oyu Tolgoi mine. During his third parliamentary term, he served as the Chairman of the Standing Committee on Security and Foreign Policy from 2008 to 2011.

Enkhbold has been perceived and has maintained his image as a brave, honest, and disinterested politician. Unlike most leaders in the DP, he has been much less involved in deals between the DP and the Mongolian People's Party (MPP) since 2004 and did not serve as a cabinet member in the coalition governments of 2004 and 2008. Moreover, Enkhbold has often come to public attention through his questions and statements about the misconduct of politicians, often including fellow DP members.

In 2012, Enkhbold founded "Shonkhor" (lit. "Falcon"), an influential faction within the DP. Enkhbold was a co-author of the new parliamentary election law introduced in early 2012, which implemented a mix of majoritarian districts and proportional representation, a women's quota for candidates, electronic counting of ballots, and more stringent requirements for candidates and party platforms.

=== Speaker ===
In the 2012 parliamentary election, the DP listed Enkhbold second on its proportional representation closed party list. Following the Democratic victory in June 2012, he was nominated as the next Chairman of the State Great Khural during the first session of the State Great Khural. He was elected as chairman by 95.2% of the parliamentary vote, succeeding Damdiny Demberel (MPP) on 24 July 2012. Democratic Party chairman Norovyn Altankhuyag would be elected as the Prime Minister of Mongolia on 10 August 2012.

Later in 2014, the MPP, several Shonkhor faction and Justice Coalition MPs would succeed (36–30) in overthrowing Altankhuyag's government in a motion of no confidence on 5 November 2014, effectively forcing Altankhuyag to resign as both prime minister and party chairman. Enkhbold assumed the role of party chairman on 14 November, whilst Chimediin Saikhanbileg was nominated and appointed as the next prime minister on 21 November.

=== Loss of seat ===
He was unseated in the 2016 parliamentary election, where the Mongolian People's Party won a supermajority of 62 seats in the parliament. Subsequently, he resigned as DP chairman and was succeeded by Sodnomzunduin Erdene.

In July 2017, after Democratic nominee Khaltmaagiin Battulga was elected as the 5th President of Mongolia, he was appointed Head of the Presidential Office and served until his resignation in 2021.
