= 1990 Mongolian parliamentary election =

- People's Grand Khural
- 22 July 1990 (first round); 29 July 1990 (second round)
- All 430 seats in the People's Grand Khural; 216 seats needed for a majority
- Turnout: 97.89% (▼2.11pp)
Party	Leader	Seats	+/–
MPRP	Gombojavyn Ochirbat	357	+11
Democratic	Erdeniin Bat-Üül	16	New
Revolutionary Youth League	–	9	New
MNPP	Davaadorjiin Ganbold	6	New
MSDP	Bat-Erdeniin Batbayar	4	New
Independents	–	38	New
This lists parties that won seats. See the complete results below.
- State Little Khural
- 29 July 1990
- All 50 seats in the State Little Khural; 26 seats needed for a majority
Party	Vote %	Seats	+/–
MPRP	61.26	31	New
Democratic	24.14	13	New
MNPP	5.90	3	New
MSDP	5.48	3	New
This lists parties that won seats. See the complete results below.
Chairman of the Council of Ministers before	Chairman of the Council of Ministers after
Sharavyn Gungaadorj; MPRP	Sharavyn Gungaadorj; MPRP

Parliamentary elections were held in the Mongolian People's Republic in July 1990. Primaries for local constituencies for the 430 seats of the People's Grand Khural was held on 22 July 1990, with a main round of voting on candidates for the Grand Khural and party vote for indirectly electing the State Little Khural on 29 July. Election turnout was at 97.89% on 29 July. Elections for several disputed constituencies were held on 26 August.

Held in the aftermath of the peaceful 1990 revolution, they were the first democratic elections in Mongolia's history. Multiple international observers stated the election was overly free and fair despite isolated problems. The former sole legal party, the Mongolian People's Revolutionary Party (MPRP), won a supermajority of 357 seats in the upper house, and 31 of the 50 seats in the lower house. Opposition parties won around 8% and 40% of the seats in both chambers, with the Mongolian Democratic Party (MDP), Mongolia's first opposition party, as the largest. A national unity government was formed between the MPRP, the MDP, and the Mongolian National Progress Party in September 1990.

The twelfth People's Great Khural convened on September 3 and subsequently elected the President, the Vice President, the Prime Minister, the Speaker, and lower house deputies. The Grand Khural elected fifty deputies to the Little Khural, the standing legislature, via proportional representation of the party vote during its plenary session. The first State Little Khural convened later on September 13 with 53 members (including the speaker, deputy chairperson, and secretary general).

== Background ==
=== 1990 Democratic Revolution ===
In 1989, the Mongolian People's Republic (MPR) witnessed a series of demonstrations against the government, ruled by the Mongolian People's Revolutionary Party (MPRP) since 1921, by a pro-democracy organisation, the Mongolian Democratic Union (MDU). The MDU formed on 10 December of that year by young intellectuals influenced by similar movements in Eastern Europe. General secretary of the MPRP, Jambyn Batmönkh, promised reform to placate the growing demonstrations and met with the MDU leaders, although premier Dumaagiin Sodnom and other leading Politburo members felt that a gradual five-year plan for reforms could be undertaken. Between February and March 1990, four opposition parties were established. Following the heightened mass demonstrations and hunger strike, round table talks were held between the government and the opposition on 8-9 March 1990. With an agreement reached, MPRP leader Batmönkh announced the resignation of the politburo on 9 March 1990. The politburo was reshuffled on 14 March 1990, during the MPRP's emergency plenum, ultimately paving the way for political reform in Mongolia.

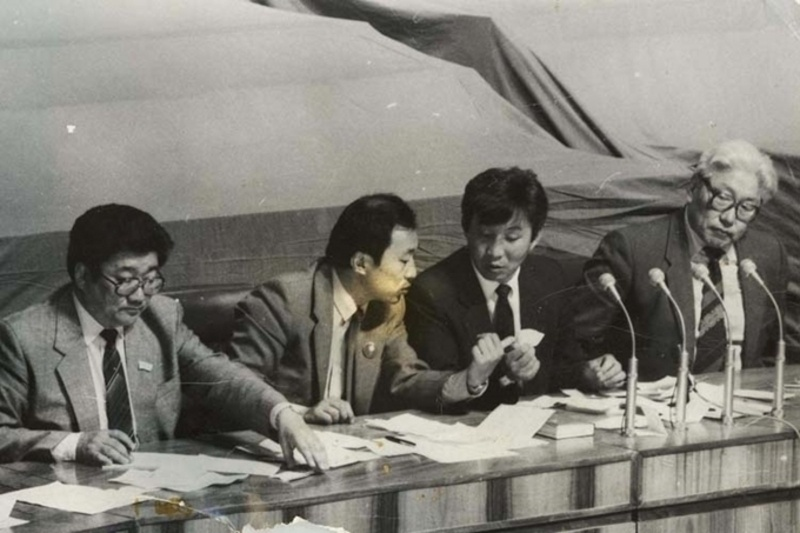
Government figures P.Ochirbat (leftmost) and D.Byambasüren (rightmost) with opposition leaders Da.Ganbold (centre-left) and E.Bat-Üül (centre-right) during a legislative session, June 1990

On 21-23 March 1990, during the 8th extraordinary People's Grand Khural session, the constitutional provision: "The guiding force of the Mongolian People's Republic is the Mongolian People's Revolutionary Party, which uses the all-conquering Marxist-Leninist theory in its operations." was removed from the Constitution of the MPR; officially ending 70 years of one-party rule. Punsalmaagiin Ochirbat became Chairman of the Presidium of the People's Grand Khural (head of state) with Sharavyn Gungaadorj appointed as Chairman of the Council of Ministers (head of government), although it was agreed that the Grand Khural would meet again in May to discuss further constitutional change, making these appointments temporary.

During the MPRP's extraordinary party congress in April, MPRP general secretary Gombojavyn Ochirbat urged the party to deepen the party restructuring and party renewal, distancing itself from Marxism–Leninism. Also the same month, in its own congress, the main opposition Mongolian Democratic Party (MDP) stressed its aim to democratise all public organizations and reform the Mongolian political system, as well as to develop private ownership of property.

The demonstrations continued, however, (largely as a consequence of the lack of funding and media access for the newly formed opposition parties in contrast to the ruling MPRP), and the Mongolian People's Army was used against the demonstrators in April. Meetings were held with the opposition on April 30, and free elections to the legislature were agreed on May 14.

== Electoral system ==
On 14 May 1990, Decree No.110 of the Presidium of the People's Great Khural stated that the 12th election of the People's Great Khural and 16th local elections of the provincial and municipal khurals will be held on Sunday, 29 July 1990. The decree also provided that an additional party preference survey will be held as the first stage of electing the first State Little Khural, the standing legislature consisting of 50 deputies.

Each of the 430 seats of the Grand Khural were to be elected from a single-member district. Of the total constituencies, 370 seats represented rural areas (where two thirds of the population resided) and around 60 seats represented the remaining third living in urban areas. Seats for the Little Khural were to be distributed among registered political parties proportional to the total party vote cast on 29 July. The electoral system for both chambers of the legislature were criticized by opposition parties for giving the MPRP an electoral advantage.

For the nomination of candidates, a traditional Soviet-style nomination process was chosen. Any officially recognized group of 150 people in cities or 50 people in rural areas could nominate a candidate regardless of party affiliation. However, this system led to a proliferation of candidates (as many as 70) in each districts and received opposition criticism for favoring the MPRP due to its nationwide organization. The proliferation of candidates was originally to be resolved in the same manner as provided for in USSR elections - by district "caucuses" which would winnow the many candidates for each seat down to a few. Nevertheless, under pressure from political parties, the government opted for a primary election which would reduce the field of candidates to the two most popular candidates in each district, without regard to their party affiliation. The primary election was to be conducted on 22 July 1990.

== Parties ==
=== Registered parties ===
According to the new electoral law, parties registered by the Supreme Court were allowed to run in the elections. The ruling MPRP and the Mongolian National Progress Party were registered first on 16 May 1990. The last party to be registered was the Mongolian Green Party on 26 May 1990. By then, a total of six political parties were officially registered for the July elections.

Party	Abbr.	Members	Ideology (Note: Parties in Mongolia are built around patronage networks rather than distinct political ideologies)	Registration
Mongolian People's Revolutionary Party	MPRP; МАХН	~100,000	Democratic socialism	16 May
Mongolian National Progress Party	MNPP; МҮДН	1,800	Economic liberalism	16 May
Mongolian Free Labour Party	MFLP; МЧХН	809	Reformism	22 May
Mongolian Democratic Party	MDP; МоАН	7,200	Reformism / Liberalism / Anti-communism	24 May
Mongolian Social Democratic Party	MSDP; МСДН	2,900	Social democracy	25 May
Mongolian Green Party	MGP; МНН	806	Green liberalism / Green politics	26 May

=== Candidates ===
Altogether, 2,413 candidates were nominated for the 430 national seats and 17,376 candidates were nominated for the 11,307 provincial and municipal seats.

== Campaign ==
However, the MPRP soon took the lead by promising to cancel some debts, lower the cost of heating, and provide higher wages for the poor and students. They combined this with the removal of their links to the security forces and army in order to prevent a threatened opposition boycott.

In order to support party electoral activities and provide equal opportunities for campaigning, the government provided financial support of 1.7 million tugriks to all parties for election campaigns.

On 22 July, preliminary polling took place in 238 of the 430 election districts in order to narrow the field of candidates to two per constituency. The voter turnout was reportedly 92.4%. Ultimately, the field was narrowed from 2,413 to 799 candidates. Of the 799 candidates, 68 were from the MDU/MDP, 15 from the MNPP, 18 from the MSDP, while the rest were either from the MPRP or other organizations. At the 33th constituency, no candidates received the majority vote to advance. A re-nomination primary was planned by the Presidium of the Great Khural to be held on 15 August, while second round of voting in contested districts were scheduled on 26 August.

== Conduct ==
On 29 July 1990, polling stations opened at 06:00AM and closed at 10:00PM. Voting procedures were monitored by foreign observers and journalists, including teams from the USA, USSR, Poland, Japan, India, South Korea, and Hungary. The elections were deemed generally free and fair by foreign observers. Due to election irregularities, 28 seats were held up.

The National Election Commission claimed around 92% of the eligible voters had voted by 9PM before polling stations closed. On 29 July, election commission spokesman D.Sharvavny said figures from some remote areas were not yet in, noting that half of the population were nomadic herdsman with no fixed residence.

Chairman of the Presidium (head of state), Punsalmaagiin Ochirbat, who voted mid-morning in Ulaanbaatar, told reporters he had conceded his party would be forced to share power in parliament. He predicted that "the opposition could get as much as 20 percent," while claiming his "party's victory is very safe."

According to UPI news, MDU chairperson and pro-democracy leader, Sanjaasürengiin Zorig, predicted an opposition share of 13% and an even better performance in the State Little Khural preference poll. Opposition leaders predicted they could win up to half the 50 seats in the lower house, asserting that whatever the outcome, the next government would be considerably more reformist.

Following the two polling days - 29 July and 26 August, the latter necessitated by the fact that in 24 constituencies no candidate had received the minimum vote - 422 deputies for the Grand Khural, 1,765 deputies for municipal khurals, 8,977 deputies for soum khurals, 936 deputies for khoroo khurals, and 1,049 deputies for provincial city khurals were elected. Re-elections were held in the 36th, 147th, 259th, 351st, 353rd, and 358th districts.

== Results ==
=== People's Grand Khural ===
Party	Votes	%	Seats	+/–
Mongolian People's Revolutionary Party			357	+11
Mongolian Democratic Party			16	New
Mongolian Revolutionary Youth League			9	New
Mongolian National Progress Party			6	New
Mongolian Social Democratic Party			4	New
Mongolian Green Party			0	New
Mongolian Free Labour Party			0	New
Independents			38	–
Total			430	+60
Total votes	1,005,629	–		
Registered voters/turnout	1,027,277	97.89		
Source: Nohlen et al., IPU

=== State Little Khural ===
Party	Votes	%	Seats
Mongolian People's Revolutionary Party	598,984	61.26	31
Mongolian Democratic Party	236,087	24.14	13
Mongolian National Progress Party	57,691	5.90	3
Mongolian Social Democratic Party	53,545	5.48	3
Mongolian Green Party	12,044	1.23	0
Mongolian Free Labour Party	11,823	1.21	0
All candidates deleted	7,638	0.78	–
Total	977,812	100.00	50
Valid votes	977,812	97.23	
Invalid/blank votes	27,817	2.77	
Total votes	1,005,629	100.00	
Registered voters/turnout	1,027,277	97.89	
Source: Nohlen et al.

== Aftermath ==
The MPRP took 60% of the vote but won 357 seats, with opposition parties only managing 26 seats despite winning 40% of the vote. The MDU/MDP won 16 seats. Nine seats were secured by members of the Mongolian Revolutionary Youth League, the youth movement of the MPRP which later distanced and reformed itself as the Mongolian Youth Union in 1991.

The newly elected People's Grand Khural took office on 3 September 1990. During its plenary session, the Grand Khural confirmed incumbent Punsalmaagiin Ochirbat (MPRP) as President and Jambyn Gombojav (MPRP) as new chairman of the Grand Khural on 3 September. Reform-minded economist Dashiin Byambasüren (MPRP) was appointed as Prime Minister on 11 September. Radnaasümbereliin Gonchigdorj (MSDP) was appointed Vice President (also the Chairman of the State Little Khural) as part of an effort by the MPRP to cooperate with the opposition.

The People's Grand Khural also elected the 50 members of the State Little Khural according to the party preference vote, where the MPRP received 60%, and the opposition received 40%. The MPRP secured 31 seats, followed by the MDP with 13, the MNPP and MSDP with 3, respectively. The standing legislature convened on September 13. Later in October, a sixteen-member coalition government was established between the MPRP, the MDP, and the MNPP. Davaadorjiin Ganbold, a prominent economist and the leader of the MNPP, was appointed as the First Deputy Prime Minister and Dambiin Dorligjav, deputy chairperson of the MDP, was appointed Deputy Prime Minister.

== See also ==
- Mongolian Revolution of 1990
- 1993 Mongolian presidential election
