= School No.1 of Ulaanbaatar =

Public school in Sükhbaatar, Ulaanbaatar, Mongolia

Coordinates: 47°54′55.8″N 106°54′42.6″E

School No.1
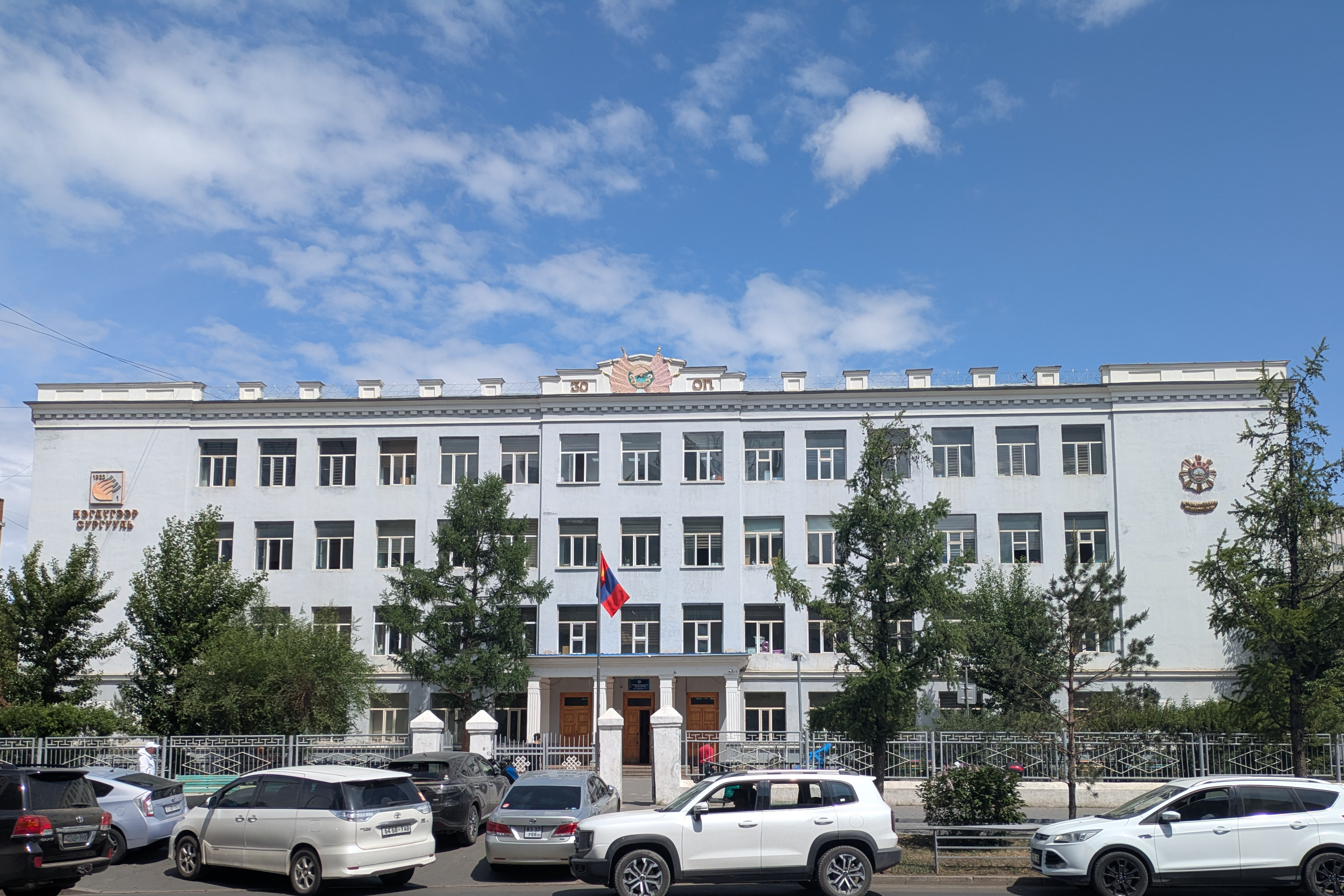

Location
- 14250 Seoul st, Sükhbaatar district Ulaanbaatar, Mongolia

Information
- Type: Public
- Motto: Always groundbreaking, Always leader
- Established: 1923
- Principal: Enkhbat R
- Grades: 1-12
- Enrollment: ~4000
- Phone: +976-11-323721
- Website: School No.1 of Ulaanbaatar

School No.1 (Mongolian: 1 дүгээр сургууль) is a public school in Sükhbaatar District, Ulaanbaatar, Mongolia. Mongolia's first government-run public primary school was founded in 1921, and its first secondary school, School No.1, was founded in 1923.

As of 2010, there are about 2,150 students in 46 classes, 80 teachers, and 20 service workers in the school. About 8,000 students graduated from the school in the last academic years.

== Campus ==
The school campus is in the center of the Ulaanbaatar city. School No.1 has three buildings, one of which is an elementary school building.

== History ==
When the school began in 1923, it had six female students. In 1989, a pilot project to teach the Mongolian script was begun at School No.1.

== Notable alumni ==
- Erdeniin Bat-Üül
- Jadambyn Enkhbayar
- Miyeegombyn Enkhbold
- Mendsaikhany Enkhsaikhan
