= Sanjaasürengiin Zorig =

Mongolian politician (1962–1998)

- Санжаасүрэнгийн Зориг
- Zorig in the early 1990s

Minister of Infrastructure
- In office 23 April 1998 – 2 October 1998
- Prime Minister: Tsakhiagiin Elbegdorj
- Preceded by: Galsandagvyn Nyamdavaa
- Succeeded by: Gavaagiin Batkhuu

Member of the State Great Khural
- In office 20 July 1992 – 2 October 1998
- Succeeded by: Sanjaasürengiin Oyun
- Constituency: 17th, Dornod Province (1996–1998); 23th, Sükhbaatar District (1992–1996)

Personal details
- Born: 20 April 1962 Ulaanbaatar, Mongolian People's Republic
- Died: 2 October 1998 (aged 36) Ulaanbaatar, Mongolia
- Resting place: Altan-Ölgii National Cemetery
- Party: Mongolian National Democratic Party (1992–1998)
- Other political affiliations: Mongolian United Party (1991–1992); Mongolian Democratic Party (1990–1991)
- Spouse: B.Bulgan
- Education: Moscow State University (1985)
- Profession: Politician

Sanjaasürengiin Zorig (Mongolian: Санжаасүрэнгийн Зориг; 20 April 1962 – 2 October 1998) was a Mongolian politician who played a prominent role in leading the country's 1990 Democratic Revolution. His supporters called him the "Golden Swallow of Democracy" (Mongolian: Ардчиллын алтан хараацай, ardchillyn altan kharaatsai). He served as the chairman of the Mongolian Democratic Union, a pro-democracy non-governmental organization established in December 1989.

After the 1990 Democratic Revolution, he was elected as a deputy to the People's Great Khural from the Mongolian Democratic Party in Mongolia's first free and fair elections. Later, after Mongolia adopted its fourth constitution, Zorig was elected twice to the newly established State Great Khural in 1992 and 1996. Between April and October 1998, he served as Minister of Infrastructure in the cabinet of Tsakhiagiin Elbegdorj. On 2 October 1998, at the age of 38, Zorig was assassinated at his home. After his death, his sister Oyuun entered politics to fill his vacant parliamentary seat and later founded the Civic Will Party in 2000.

== Early life ==
Zorig's grandfather was Russian geographer and ethnographer A. D. Simukov who had come to Mongolia as part of an expedition headed by Pyotr Kozlov. Zorig's grandfather was a victim of Marshal Choibalsan's purges, leaving his daughter Dorjpalam, Zorig's mother, an orphan. Dorjpalam starred in a popular Mongolian movie before marrying Sanjaasüren, a Buryat professor at the Mongolian State University. Zorig was born on 20 April 1962 in Ulaanbaatar, the capital city of the Mongolian People's Republic, and became the second of their three children.

From 1970 onward, Zorig attended middle school No. 23 in Ulaanbaatar, one of the city's Russian-language schools. From 1980 to 1985, he studied philosophy at Moscow's Lomonosov Moscow State University. Afterward, he worked for a year as an instructor for the Mongolian Revolutionary Youth League in Ulaanbaatar, and between 1986 and 1989, as a lecturer for scientific communism at the Mongolian State University. He became an accomplished chess player, later serving as president of the Mongolian Chess Federation. In 1988, he founded the "New Generation" (Mongolian: Шинэ Үе, romanized: Shine Ue), a group of young dissidents dedicated to promoting democracy in the one-party state.

== Political career ==
=== Democratic Revolution (1989–1990) ===
Zorig calms the crowd in Sükhbaatar Square.

Between 1989 and 1990, Zorig played a leading role in the events that led to Mongolia's adoption of a multi-party system. On 10 December 1989, a month after the fall of the Berlin Wall, Zorig led a group of 200 activists in a public protest demanding a free-market economy and free elections. In January 1990, Zorig and his fellow pro-democracy dissidents began staging weekend protests in Sükhbaatar Square, the center of Ulaanbaatar. The protests started small but grew into large crowds as January passed into February. Tensions increased as the crowds swelled and the communist government debated crushing them with force. At one point, when protesters were scuffling with soldiers, and an outbreak of violence seemed likely, Zorig took a megaphone, sat atop a friend's shoulders to make himself visible to the crowd, and called for calm. Violence was averted. The picture of Zorig addressing the protesters became a famous symbol of Mongolia's peaceful 1990 revolution. In March, the politburo of the ruling Mongolian People's Revolutionary Party (MPRP) resigned, and one-party rule in Mongolia ended. The country's first-ever multi-party elections were scheduled to be held in the summer of 1990.

=== Post-revolution (1990–1998) ===
In July 1990, Zorig was elected as a deputy to the People's Great Khural. In August 1991, he was the only prominent Mongolian politician to immediately denounce the coup attempt by Soviet hardliners against Mikhail Gorbachev. He was elected into the State Great Khural both in 1992 and 1996, the first time as a minority member and the second time as a member of the Democratic Union Coalition that swept into power as Mongolia's first non-communist government since the 1921 People's Revolution. Zorig questioned the pace of free-market reforms in Mongolia after the Democrats came to power, believing the reforms weren't fair and would push too many Mongolians below the poverty line.

The year 1998 was a year of political crisis in Mongolia. Tsakhiagiin Elbegdorj became the new Prime Minister of Mongolia while Zorig became Minister for Infrastructure in April 1998. In one of his first decisions, prime minister Elbegdorj sold the state-owned Reconstruction Bank to the private Golomt Bank, which was owned by Mongolian Democrats. Legislators of the MPRP walked out in protest, and, without a working majority in parliament, Elbegdorj was forced to resign in July. The parties conferred and, in closed meetings, agreed on Infrastructure Minister S. Zorig as a compromise candidate to be the new prime minister. The announcement was scheduled for Monday, 5 October.

== Assassination ==
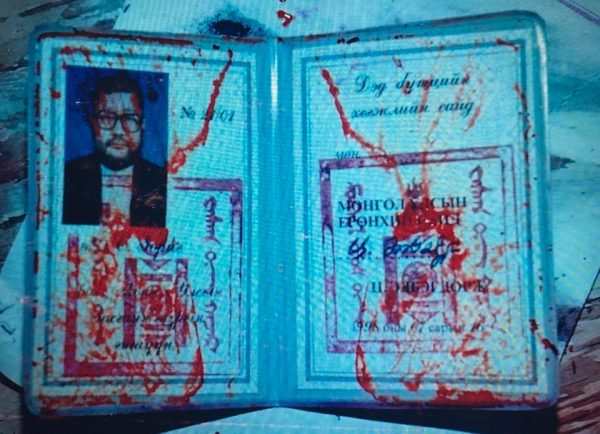
Government minister ID of Zorig after his murder, October 1998

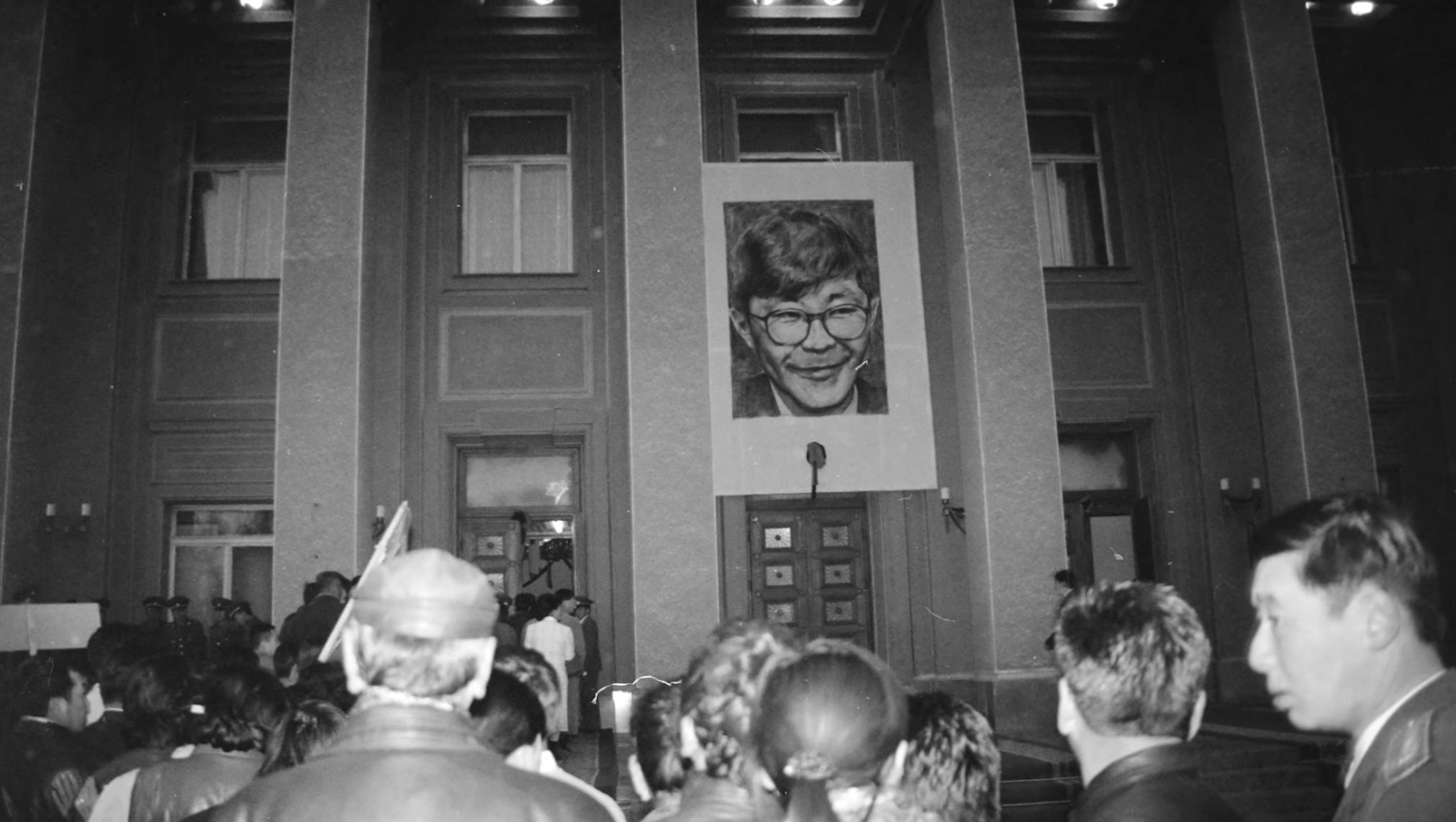
State funeral of Zorig on 5–8 October 1998; around 30,000 people gathered to pay tribute to him at Sükhbaatar Square

Zorig was murdered on Friday, 2 October 1998. Two assailants entered his apartment, tied up his wife, Bulgan, and waited. As soon as Zorig stepped through the door, they jumped on him and stabbed him sixteen times, including three stab wounds to the heart. They stole a bottle of vinegar and a bottle of soy sauce from the refrigerator before fleeing the apartment. Four days after the murder, mourners crowded Sükhbaatar Square, holding candlelight vigils. His body was laid in the Government House before his burial on 7 October. Zorig was subsequently buried at the Altan-Ölgii National Cemetery.

The government crisis lingered for another two months until Janlavyn Narantsatsralt, the mayor of Ulaanbaatar, was named the new prime minister in December 1998.

His murder remained unsolved for 19 years until December 2016, leading to speculation that someone with insider knowledge of Zorig's impending elevation to the post of prime minister perpetrated his killing to prevent it. Zorig's wife, Bulgan, came under suspicion and was briefly held by police, but no charges were ever brought.

== Aftermath ==
Zorig's sister Sanjaasürengiin Oyuun was elected to his seat in the Mongolian parliament soon after his assassination. She later served as Mongolia's Minister of Foreign Affairs. The political party founded by Oyuun, the Irgenii Zorig Nam (Mongolian: "Иргэний зориг" нам) or Civic Will Party, bears a reference to his name.

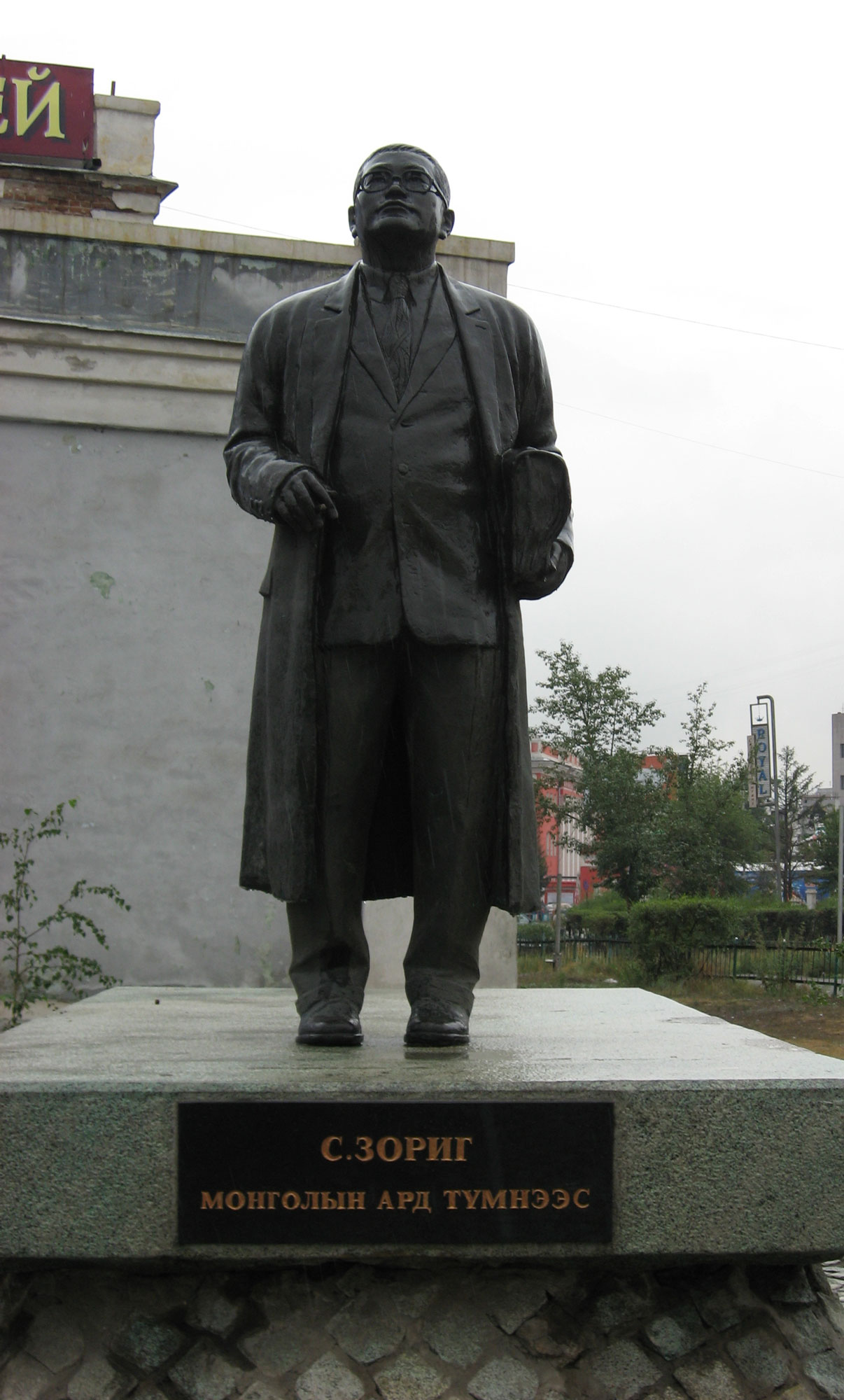
A memorial to Zorig in Ulaanbaatar. The plaque reads, "S. Zorig / From the people of Mongolia".

A statue for him has been erected in Ulaanbaatar, across the street from the Central Post Office. The statue faces toward the Government Palace, symbolising Zorig's morning walk toward his workplace. Flowers are placed at the statue every year on the day of his death, attended by his family members, friends, politicians, and other citizens.

The Zorig Foundation, founded in October 1998 shortly after S. Zorig's murder, exists today as "a Mongolian non-profit organization promoting democracy through social action, youth activities, and good governance programs."

== Murder case trial ==
In December 2016, the district court in a closed hearing has convicted three individuals Ts. Amgalanbaatar, D. Sodnomdarjaa and T. Chimgee of the 1998 murder. The panel of judges issued a guilty verdict after the hearing that was held over a period of 6 weeks. The defendants were each given prison sentences of between 24 and 25 years to be carried in a strict regime prison. In March 2017, the Criminal Appeals Court of Ulaanbaatar has rejected the appeal of the 3 defendants after confirming that the testimony by the convicts D. Sodnomdarjaa and Ts. Amgalanbaatar given during the investigation regarding the case and the facts, as well as the hand-written testament by B. Sodnomdarjaa correspond to the testimonies of the relevant witnesses, material evidences from the site of the case, notes taken during the investigation at the site of the crime, as well as the conclusions of the experts regarding bodily injuries of the victim.

Then-deputy prime minister Tsendiin Nyamdorj, some other politicians and victim's family members questioned the decision to hold the trial behind closed doors. In December 2017, the Cabinet of Mongolia permitted the declassification of the majority of the murder case file, consisting of 14,926 pages, while 74 pages of materials were to be kept classified. The declassified documents had been transferred from the General Intelligence Agency of Mongolia to the Archive of Criminal Cases Database under the Supreme Court of Mongolia. As of April 2026, the crime remains unsolved; many believe corrupt parliament members hired people to kill him.
