= Mongolia's Law on Deliberative Polling =

Mongolia's Law on Deliberative Polling is a law that codified the deliberative polling process into Mongolian law. It was ratified on February 9, 2017. It requires deliberative polling on potential amendments to the Mongolian Constitution before they are considered by parliament. It is the first ever instance of a country incorporating deliberative polling into its national law.

Erdeniin Bat-Üül and Gombojavyn Zandanshatar led the efforts to codify deliberative polling in Mongolia as co-chairs of the Advisory Committee for Deliberative Polling. The law originated in Ulanbataar's 2015 deliberative polling project and was first implemented in the process that produced Mongolia's constitutional amendments of 2019.

== 2015 deliberative poll in Ulaanbaatar ==
The first deliberative poll in Mongolia took place in Ulaanbaatar in 2015 and asked participants to rate and rank fourteen infrastructure projects that could be included in the city's Action Plan. These projects were sourced from years of public meetings with city residents. The 317 residents who were selected to participate in the deliberative poll met on the 12 and 13 December 2015, to discuss the issue in the Government Palace in Ulanbataar.

The baseline and post-deliberation polls taken by the deliberative poll's participants revealed significant shifts in their rating and ranking of the proposed infrastructure projects. Support for eight projects changed significantly, while nearly all projects changed position in the overall rankings. All fourteen infrastructure projects were included in the city's Action Plan and were prioritized according to their rank at the end of the deliberative polling process. Ratified as Resolution #174 of 2016, the Action Plan became a legally binding document. Infrastructure projects from the plan were soon realized, such as the top-ranked project concerning adequate school heating.

== 2017 Law on deliberative polling ==
The success of the deliberative poll in Ulaanbaatar prompted parliament to pass a national law requiring deliberative polling on potential amendments to the Mongolian Constitution before they can be considered by Parliament. The law describes mandatory features of such Deliberative Polls. Notably, an Advisory Committee made up of eight neutral members (with backgrounds in research, the private sector, or NGOs) must oversee the entire process. The committee is tasked with developing the poll used in the deliberative polling process, selecting experts to assist participants, and reporting on the process' results to parliament. Additionally, the law dictates that the selection of participants must be conducted by a professional survey research organization and details the scale of sampling and degree of participation needed to validate such a Deliberative Poll.

== 2019 Amendments to the Constitution ==
In 2017, the Mongolian People's Party (MPP) invoked the country's constitutional amendment process which led to the first application of the country's new Law on Deliberative Polling. The Deliberative Polling Advisory Committee created an agenda based on input from thousands of public meetings throughout Mongolia that proposed six potential constitutional amendments. Participants gathered on the 29th and 30 April 2017, to deliberate in the Government Palace in Ulanbataar.

The selection of the deliberative poll's participants was carried out by the National Statistical Office of Mongolia, with assistance from Stanford's Center for Deliberative Democracy. Individuals from 1568 households across Mongolia were selected for an initial interview. Of the 1515 people who completed that interview, 785 were invited to participate in the deliberative poll and 669 ultimately did.

Participants' answers to the deliberative poll suggested significant opinion shifts but consistent support for the most popular amendments. Their answers to ten out of the eighteen questions in the deliberative poll changed significantly over the process. The proposed amendments that saw the greatest drops in approval were the proposal for a bicameral parliament and the indirect, rather than direct, election of the president. Neither amendment was subsequently considered by parliament despite both previously being the amendments most strongly supported by Mongolia's two political parties (the MPP supported the indirect election the president, while the opposition Democratic Party supported a bicameral parliament). The abandonment of these amendments is evidence of the significant influence that the findings of the Deliberative Poll had over the constitutional amendments that were ultimately passed by parliament on the fourteenth of November, 2019.
