= Losolyn Byambajargal =

Mongolian politician

Лосолын Бямбажаргал
- Born: November 7, 1964 (age 61); Govi-Altai Province, Mongolian People's Republic
- Occupations: Theoretical physics, Politician
- Political party: Mongolian Social Democratic Party
- Children: 2: Amgalan Byambajargalyn; Erdene Byambajargalyn
- Awards: Honored teacher of Mongolia

Losolyn Byambajargal (Mongolian: Лосолын Бямбажаргал; born November 7, 1964) is a Mongolian politician.

== Early life and career ==
Byambajargal was born in Govi-Altai Province on November 7, 1964. Until 1982, he attended Altai s no.1 middle school, and in 1987 graduated from the physics department of the Irkutsk State University. From 1987 to 1989, he worked as a National University of Mongolia teacher in the Khovd branch (later Khovd University), and afterwards worked at the Astronomical Observatory of the academy of sciences in Ulaanbaatar.

In 1989, Byambajargal formed an opposition group, the first that articulated dissent with the ruling Mongolian People's Revolutionary Party in December 1989. Byambajargal was one of the leaders of 1990 Democratic Revolution in Mongolia (Mongolian: Ардчилсан хувьсгал, Ardchilsan Khuvĭsgal, Democratic Revolution). He served as secretary general of the Mongolian Social Democratic Party (joined to Democratic Party, 2000) from 1990 to 1999 and since 2005. Since 2009 he is President of the Nuclear Radiology Association of Mongolia.
