= Mendsaikhany Enkhsaikhan =

Former Prime Minister of Mongolia

- Мэндсайханы Энхсайхан
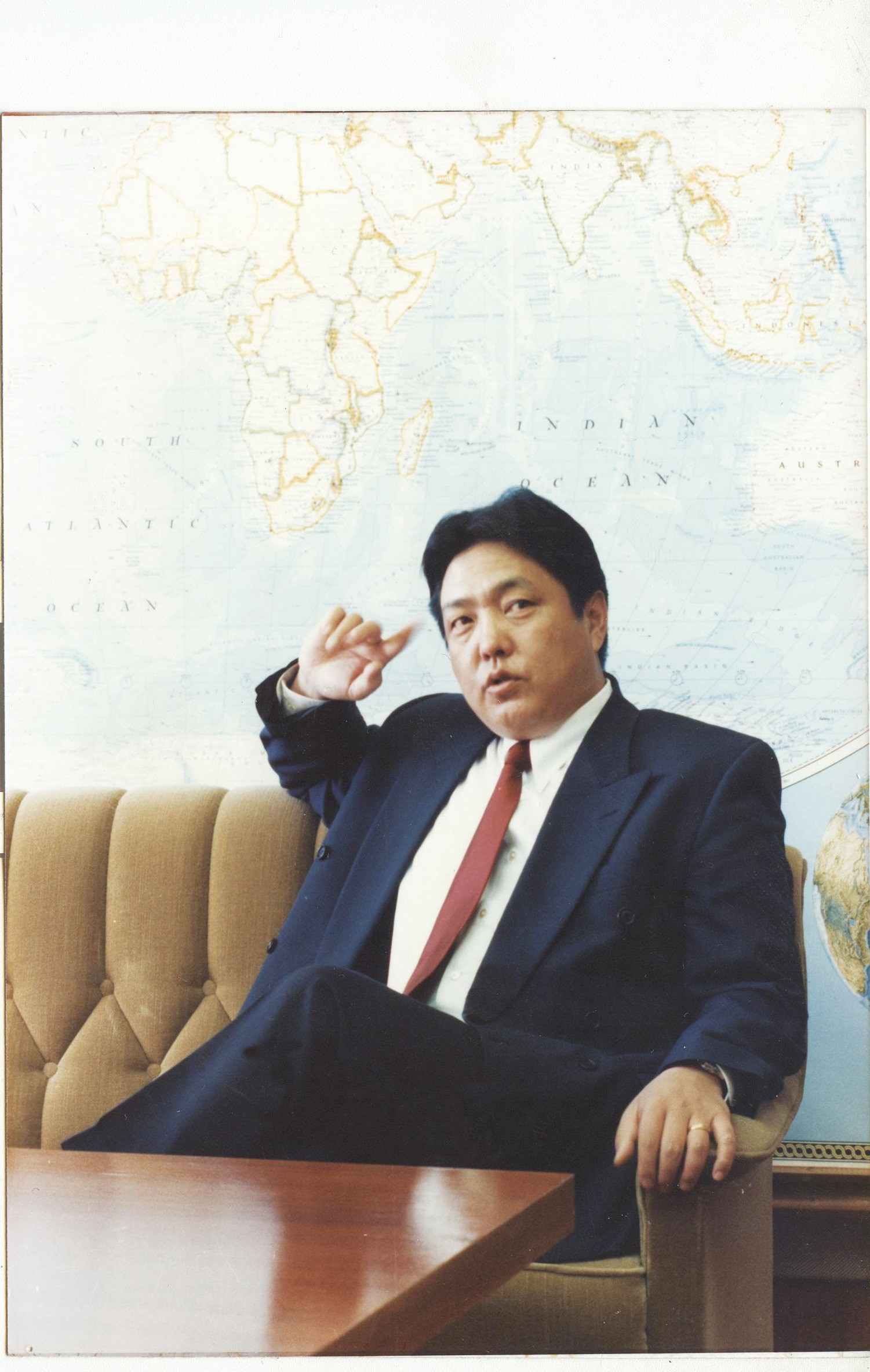
- Enkhsaikhan in 1998

18th Prime Minister of Mongolia
- In office 19 July 1996 – 23 April 1998
- President: Natsagiin Bagabandi
- Preceded by: Puntsagiin Jasrai
- Succeeded by: Tsakhiagiin Elbegdorj

Deputy Prime Minister of Mongolia
- In office 28 January 2006 – 5 December 2007
- Prime Minister: Miyeegombyn Enkhbold
- Preceded by: Chültemiin Ulaan
- Succeeded by: Miyeegombyn Enkhbold

Minister of Mongolia
- In office 10 December 2014 – 23 July 2016
- Prime Minister: Chimediin Saikhanbileg
- Preceded by: Office established
- Succeeded by: Office abolished

Chief of Staff of the Office of the President of Mongolia
- In office 1993–1996
- President: Punsalmaagiin Ochirbat

Ambassador Extraordinary and Plenipotentiary of Mongolia to the Kingdom of Sweden
- In office 17 November 2016 – 17 May 2018
- President: Tsakhiagiin Elbegdorj; Khaltmaagiin Battulga

Member of the State Great Khural
- In office 26 July 2004 – 28 August 2008
- Constituency: 47th, Khövsgöl Province
- In office 20 July 1992 – 1 July 1993
- Constituency: 26th, Oktyabr district, Ulaanbaatar

Deputy of the People's Great Khural
- In office 3 September 1990 – 20 July 1992
- Constituency: 45th, Ulaanbaatar

Member of the State Little Khural
- In office 9 September 1990 – 20 July 1992

Chairman of the Democratic Party
- In office 2002–2005
- Preceded by: Dambiin Dorligjav
- Succeeded by: Radnaasümbereliin Gonchigdorj

Chairman of the Mongolian National Democratic Party
- In office 14 September 2011 – 16 November 2016
- Preceded by: Tserendashiin Tsolmon
- Succeeded by: Bayanjargalyn Tsogtgerel
- In office 2006–2007
- Preceded by: Party established
- Succeeded by: Janlavyn Narantsatsralt

Personal details
- Born: 4 June 1955 (age 71) Ulaanbaatar, Mongolia
- Party: Democratic Party (since 2022); Mongolian National Democratic Party (2006–2017)
- Other political affiliations: Democratic Party (2000–2006); Mongolian National Democratic Party (1992–2000); Mongolian Democratic Party (1990–1992)
- Children: 1 son, 1 daughter
- Education: Kiev State University
- Profession: Politician, economist

Mendsaikhany Enkhsaikhan (Mongolian: Мэндсайханы Энхсайхан; born 4 June 1955) was the prime minister of Mongolia from July 7, 1996 to April 23, 1998, the first in 80 years not belonging to the Mongolian People's Revolutionary Party.

== Life ==
=== Early years ===
Enkhsaikhan was born 1955 in Ulaanbaatar. He participated in the International Mathematical Olympiad in 1973 and took bronze medal. He earned PhD in economic sciences from the Kiev State University, former USSR in the 1970s.

From 1978 to 1988 he worked as an economist, researcher and deputy head of a department at the Foreign Ministry of Mongolia. From 1988 to 1990 he worked as a specialist at the Ministry of Foreign Economic Relations and Trade and in the meantime, he was a director of a market research institute.

From 1990 to 1992, he held a seat in the State Little Khural (parliament) for the first time, representing the Mongolian Democratic Party and chaired a standing committee in the parliament. From 1992 to 1993 he held a seat in the State Great Khural (parliament) representing the Mongolian Democratic Party. He was appointed as a president of the Academy for Political Education in 1992.

After that he served as the chairman of the common elections commission of Mongolian National Democratic Party and Mongolian Social Democratic Party for the presidential elections of June 6, 1993. From 1993 to 1996 he worked as the chairman of the Presidential office for Punsalmaagiin Ochirbat, first official president of Mongolia.

=== Prime minister ===
Enkhsaikhan became Prime Minister of Mongolia on July 7, 1996 after the Mongolian Democratic Union Coalition won at the parliamentary elections. Enkhsaikhan was the elections campaign manager of Mongolian Democratic Union while Tsakhiagiin Elbegdorj was the coalition chairman.

This made Enkhsaikhan the first prime minister since the 1920s who wasn't a member of the Mongolian People's Revolutionary Party (MPRP). He presided over a period of aggressive economic reforms, including housing privatization, acceleration of other privatization programs, liberalization of most remaining controlled prices, closure of insolvent banks and elimination of duties on imports. Mongolian relations with international organizations such as the International Monetary Fund and World Bank, which had been strained due to slow reforms under the previous regime, strengthened. However, his tenure was cut short when the parliamentary majority of Democratic Party (DP) and Mongolian Social Democratic Party forced him to resign in April 1998, because of tensions between him and other leaders in the Coalition as well as by the rule of the Coalition, the chairman of the winning party should have become the Prime Minister. He was then replaced by Tsakhiagiin Elbegdorj (DP).

=== Further career ===
From 1998 to 2003, Enkhsaikhan was the director of the company Premier International Co.. In January 2003, the Mongolian National Democratic Party elected him party chairman, but he was removed from this position in 2005.

When Enkhsaikhan worked as a chairman of Mongolian Democratic Party he moved to form a coalition with Motherland Party. The coalition with the Motherland Party was a failure in the parliamentary elections in 2004. Three of the Democratic Party members were elected to the parliament as individuals because they were not offered slots in the coalition candidates. He became a member of the parliament in 2004 for the Democratic Party. The coalition and its opponent, the MPRP split votes.

The coalition government was established with agreements of all the parties involved. The Motherland Party was given two seats at the Government Cabinet of the grand coalition government for its 7 elected MPs vs. Democratic Party's 25 elected MPs and Civil Will Party's MPs. However, Badarchiin Erdenebat, Enkhsaikhan's elevated ally wanted Prime Ministership and one more seat at the Government Cabinet. When it was not agreed by all participating parties of the Motherland Democracy Coalition, Badarchiin Erdenebat announced the dissolution of the coalition at the parliament without consent of the coalition parties. According to Mongolian law, if someone announces anything at the parliament, it becomes valid without need of vote for this case. Mendsaikhan Enkhsaikhan joined Badarchiin Erdenebat to dissolve Motherland Democracy Coalition to join MPRP to establish new coalition with MPRP for bigger position at the government.

In 2005 Enkhsaikhan ran in the presidential elections for the Democratic Party but received less than 20% of the votes and lost against Nambaryn Enkhbayar (MPRP).

In January 2006 he voted with MPRP members for the dismissal of Elbegdorj's government. He did so in spite of a decision of the Democratic Party's Directing Board not to vote against its own coalition government. The Party's Main Legal Committee therefore canceled Enkhsaikhan's membership in February.

In the new government under Miyeegombyn Enkhbold he was appointed for the role of a Deputy Prime Minister of Mongolia. Together with few former DP members such as Sonompil Mishigjav, former Member of Parliament and Minister of Defense from Democratic Party, he later registered National New Party which competed in 2008 Parliamentary elections and 2009 by-elections and did not win any seat at the Parliament of Mongolia.

Enkhsaikhan himself was a candidate for a member of Parliament from National New Party and was defeated in the 2008 Parliamentary elections.

Political offices
Preceded by Puntsagiin Jasrai	Prime Minister of Mongolia; 1996-07-19 - 1998-04-23	Succeeded by Tsakhiagiin Elbegdorj
