= Davaadorjiin Ganbold =

Mongolian politician

- Даваадоржийн Ганболд
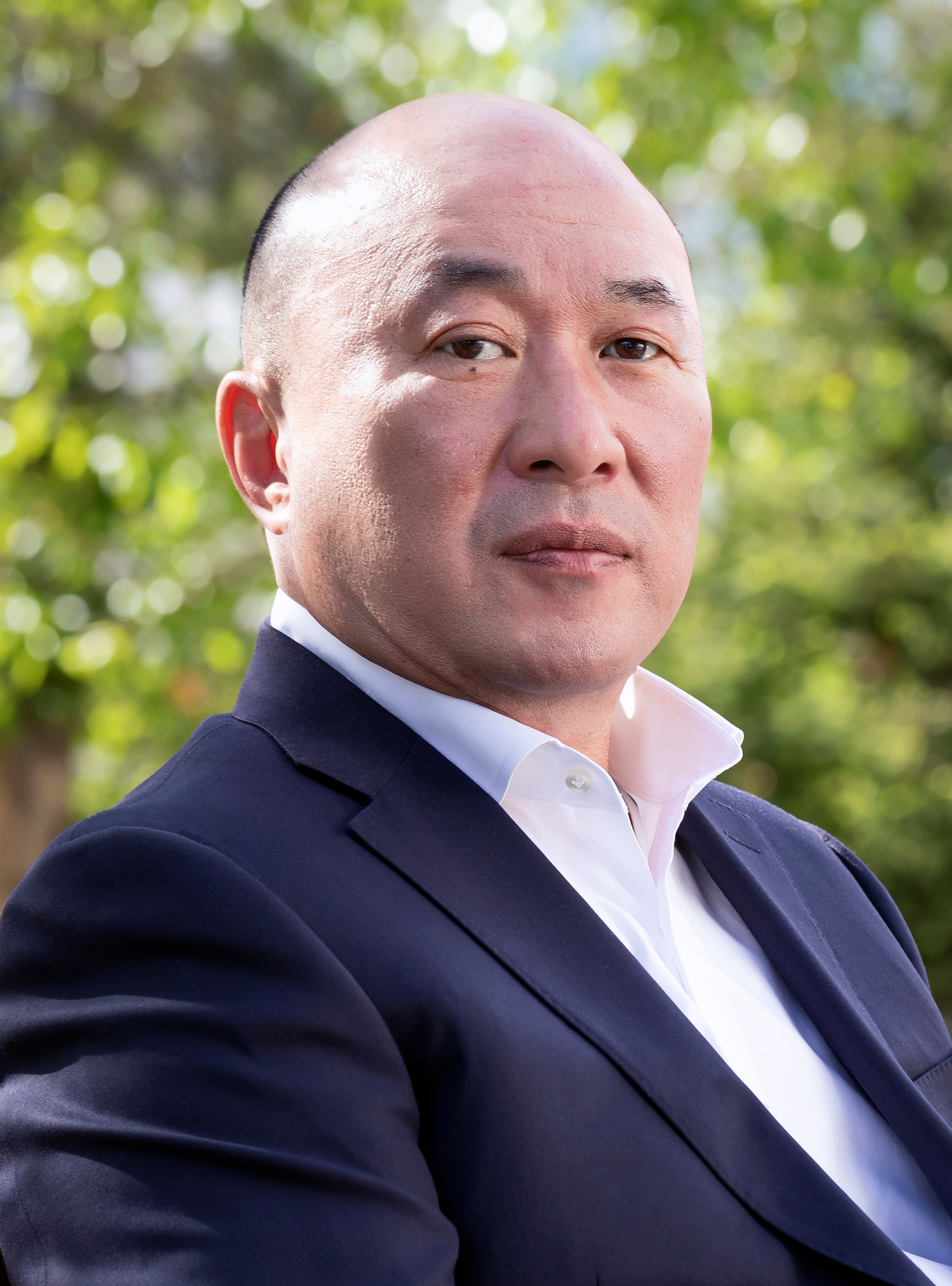
- Ganbold in 2020

First Deputy Prime Minister of Mongolia
- In office 26 September 1990 – 21 July 1992
- Prime Minister: Dashiin Byambasüren

Member of the People's Great Khural & State Little Khural
- In office 1990–1992

Member of the State Great Khural
- In office 1992–2000

Chair of Parliament's Economic Policy Standing Committee
- In office 1996–2000

Chairman of National Railway Authority
- In office 2004–2008

Vice Mayor of Ulaanbaatar
- In office 2008–2012

Personal details
- Born: 26 June 1957 (age 69) Ulaanbaatar, Mongolia
- Party: Democratic Party
- Education: Moscow State University (BA, MA, PhD)
- Occupation: Politician; economist; author

Davaadorjiin Ganbold (Mongolian: Даваадоржийн Ганболд; born 26 June 1957) or Ganbold Davaadorj is a prominent Mongolian economist and politician from the Democratic Party, known as Da.Ganbold (Mongolian: Да.Ганболд). He was one of the leading figures in the Mongolian Revolution of 1990 and Mongolian Democratic Union of the late 1980s and early 1990s. In 1990, Ganbold was elected as the Chairman of the Mongolian National Progress Party, which later merged to establish the Mongolian National Democratic Party (MNDP). The MNDP was one of the founding members of the current Democratic Party of Mongolia. Ganbold was appointed as the first Deputy Prime Minister of Mongolia from 1990 to 1992.

Ganbold served as member of parliament for the State Great Khural of Mongolia from 1992 to 2000. He was the Chairman of the Parliament's Economic Policy Standing Committee from 1996 to 2000. He is considered to be one of the main people behind the Mongolian economic reforms of the early 1990s. In 1998, he was nominated for the position of Prime Minister of Mongolia five times between July 24 and the end of August of that year, and rejected by President Natsagiin Bagabandi on each occasion.

In the end the Democratic Union gave up on getting Ganbold in as Prime Minister and instead nominated Janlavyn Narantsatsralt, whom was approved by the President of Mongolia.

Ganbold is closely connected with the Buryat Mongol people.

== Early life and education ==
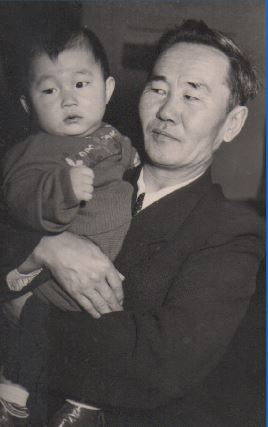
Ganbold with his grandfather Lodon Gotov in 1959.

Ganbold Davaadorj was born on June 26, 1957, in Ulaanbaatar to L. Oyun and Davaadorj Tsedevsuren. The first of the 3 siblings, he has two sisters. Oyun, his mother, was a doctor. Ganbold's father Davaadorj is a prominent Mongolian economist and until 2016 he served as a professor at the University of Finance and Economics. Davaadorj, who was a close advisor to Yumjaagiin Tsedenbal, was the official representative of Mongolia in Moscow for the Comecon.

Ganbold grew up with and was very close to his grandfather Lodon Gotov, who was one of first neurologists in Mongolia, and established the very first modern soum hospitals in Tosontsengel, Aldarkhaan and Tonkhil soums of Zavkhan and Govi-Altai provinces. Soon after his grandfather died in 1966, Ganbold moved to Moscow with his parents, where he studied in a middle school.

In 1979, Ganbold graduated Moscow State University (MSU) with a master's degree in economics. After graduation, he joined National University of Mongolia as a lecturer of economics. Later, Ganbold went back to Moscow State University and graduated with Doctor of Philosophy degree in economics in 1987. He continued to teach at the National University of Mongolia until 1990.

== Sources ==
- Nizam U. Ahmed and Philip Norton. Parliaments in Asia. p. 155-156.
