= Mongolian Democratic Party (1990) =

Political party in Mongolia (1990–1992; 2000)

Mongolian Democratic Party Монголын Ардчилсан Нам
- Abbreviation: MDP/MoDP (English); МоАН (Mongolian)
- Chairperson: Erdeniin Bat-Üül
- Founded: 18 February 1990
- Registered: 7 April 1990
- Dissolved: 25 October 1992
- Merged into: Mongolian National Democratic Party
- Headquarters: Ulaanbaatar
- Ideology: Reformism; Liberalism; Economic liberalism; Mongolian nationalism; Anti-communism
- Political position: Centre-right to right wing
- Colors: Blue
- State Great Khural (1992–1996): 4 / 76

Party flag
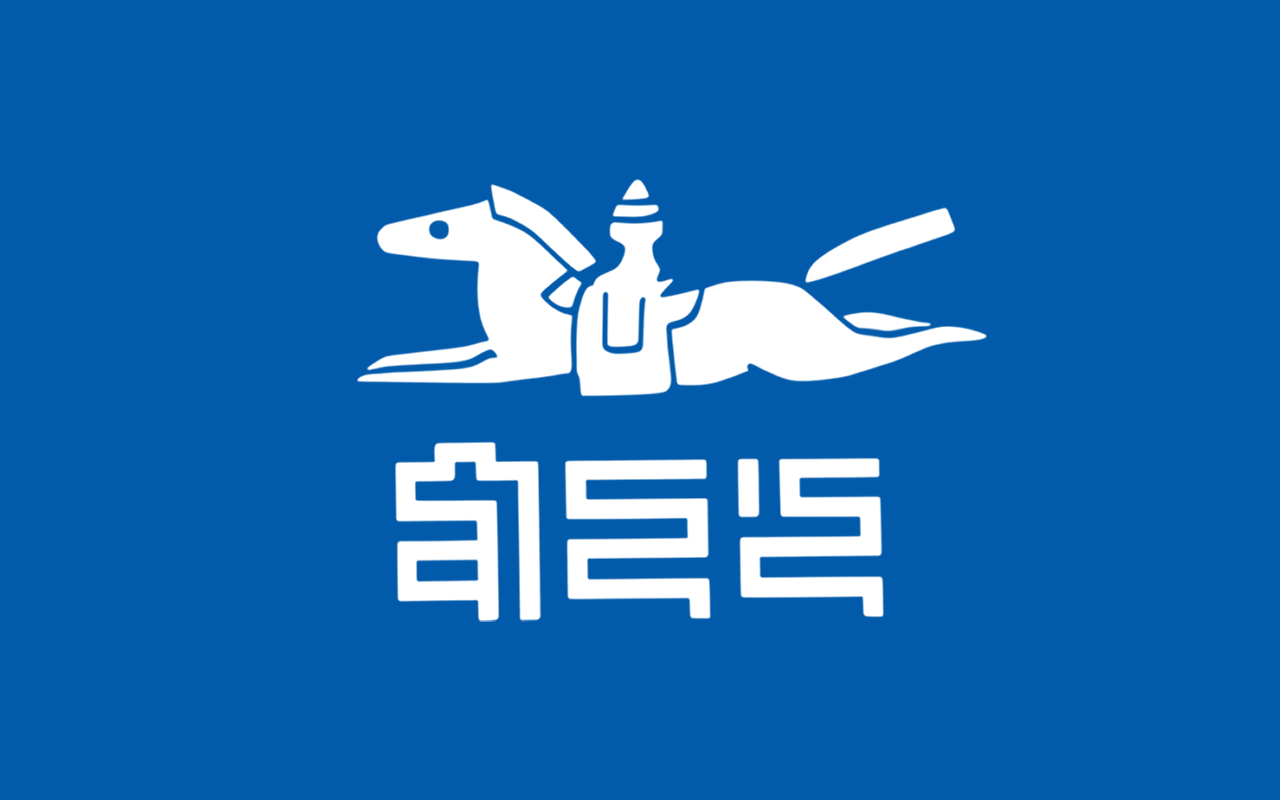

The Mongolian Democratic Party (MDP) (Mongolian: Монголын Ардчилсан Нам, romanized: Mongolyn Ardchilsan Nam) was a political party in Mongolia that existed from 1990 to 1992, and again in 2000. The MDP was the main opposition party from 1990 until 1992, when it merged with the Mongolian National Progress Party, the Mongolian United Party, and the Mongolian Renaissance Party to found the Mongolian National Democratic Party.

The MDP was re-established in early 2000 and later became a founding member of the modern-day Democratic Party in December 2000.

== History ==
=== Foundation ===
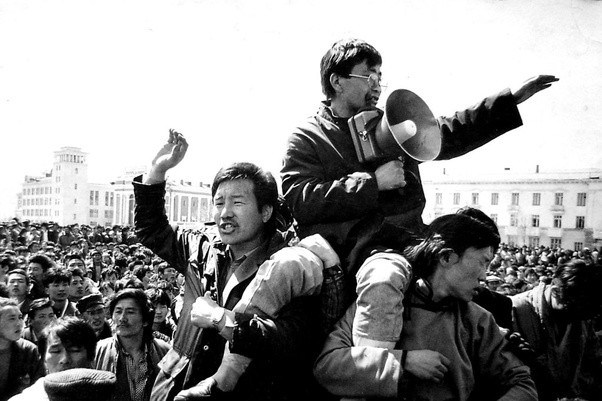
Political demonstrations led by Sanjaasürengiin Zorig in Sükhbaatar Square during the 1990 revolution

By late November 1989, pro-democracy youth intellectual groups in Ulaanbaatar, inspired by the waves of revolution in Eastern Europe, began to criticize the government of the Mongolian People's Republic and the socialist one-party state. The Mongolian Democratic Union (MDU) was formed by the end of 1989 and would lay the foundations for Mongolia's first opposition political party during the 1990 revolution. On 18 February 1990, the MDU convened its first conference and established the Mongolian Democratic Party (MDP). Erdeniin Bat-Üül was elected as the party's first chairman.

After the success of the 1990 revolution, the MDP held its first party congress on 8-9 April, during which it ratified its party charters and elected its officials. The MDP was officially registered as a legitimate political party by the Supreme Court of the Mongolian People's Republic on 7 April 1990, a day celebrated by the modern Democratic Party as the date of its first party congress and the start of its history.

In the subsequent 1990 elections, the country's first free and fair multi-party elections, the MDP would win 16 out of 430 seats in the representative People's Great Khural and 13 out of 50 seats in the newly established lower house, the State Little Khural. Therefore, making it the second-largest political party in parliament and the main opposition force against the ruling party.

In August 1991, Sanjaasürengiin Zorig, a key leader of the 1990 revolution, and his allies split off from the MDU and MDP to establish the Republican Party. Zorig's party later merged with the Mongolian Free Labour Party and wings of the MDU, and established the Mongolian United Party (MUP) on 23 March 1992.

=== Merger with the MNPP ===
After the ratification of a new constitution and the establishment of a unicameral parliament, the 1992 elections for the first State Great Khural were held on 28 June 1992. MDP chairman Mendsaikhany Enkhsaikhan signed an electoral alliance agreement with the party chairmen of the Mongolian National Progress Party (MNPP) and the Mongolian United Party on 23 April. The three-party alliance won 4 of the 76 seats in the State Great Khural. In the same year, the MDP merged with the MNPP, the MUP, and the Mongolian Renaissance Party to form the Mongolian National Democratic Party (MNDP) on 25 October.

The Democratic Union Coalition (DUC), an opposition coalition consisting mainly of the MNDP and the Mongolian Social Democratic Party (MSDP), would win 50 seats in the State Great Khural in the 1996 election, which was the first time the ex-communist Mongolian People's Revolutionary Party (MPRP) was out of power since 1921. However, due to many party infighting and political deadlock driven by the minority MPRP and the Mongolian Traditional United Party, the DUC fractured in late 1999 and early 2000.

=== Refounding ===
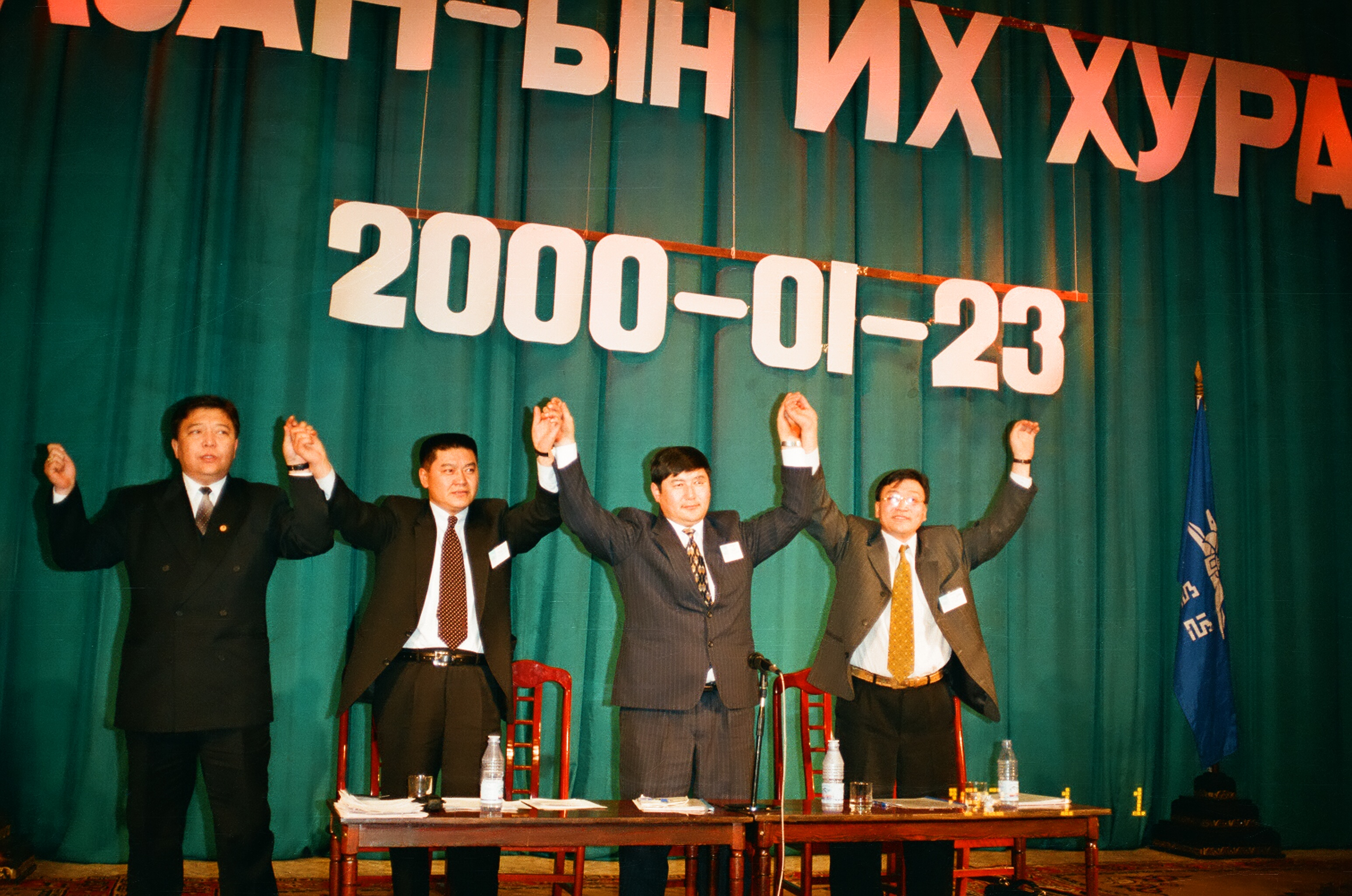
Sodnomzunduin Erdene (leftmost) at the Party Congress of the re-founded MDP, 23 January 2000

Sodnomzunduin Erdene, then-party chairman of the MNDP in Ulaanbaatar, re-founded the MDP in early 2000 and denounced the MSDP for bringing down the DUC's governments with the MPRP. The party nominated candidates and contested most of the 76 constituencies in the 2000 parliamentary election. The MPRP won a landslide victory in the subsequent election, while the opposition parties, including the MNDP, gained a total of 3 seats.

On 6 December 2000, five parties, the MNDP, the MSDP, the MDP, the Mongolian Democratic Renaissance Party, and the Mongolian Religious Democratic Party, merged and formed the modern-day Democratic Party (Mongolian: Ардчилсан Нам, romanized: Ardchilsan Nam).

== Leaders ==
- Erdeniin Bat-Üül (1990–1991)
- Mendsaikhany Enkhsaikhan (1991–1992)
- Sodnomzunduin Erdene (2000)

== Electoral history ==
=== People's Great Khural elections ===
Election	Party leader	Votes	%	Seats	+/–	Position	Government
1990	Erdeniin Bat-Üül	236,087	24.14%	People's Great Khural 16 / 430 State Little Khural 13 / 50	New	2nd	Unity government

=== State Great Khural elections ===
Election	Party leader	Votes	%	Seats	+/–	Position	Government
1992 (Note: Run together with the Mongolian National Progress Party and the Mongolian United Party.)	Mendsaikhany Enkhsaikhan	528,393	17.49%	4 / 76	▲4	2nd	Opposition
1996	Merged into the Mongolian National Democratic Party			34 / 76	—	▲1st	Governing coalition
2000	Sodnomzunduin Erdene	18,167	1.82%	0 / 76	Steady	▼7th	Extra-parliamentary

== See also ==
- Politics of Mongolia
- Mongolian Revolution of 1990
- Democratic Party (Mongolia)
- List of political parties in Mongolia
