= Mongolian Social Democratic Party =

Political party in Mongolia

Mongolian Social Democratic Party Монголын Социал Демократ Нам
- Abbreviation: MSDP (English); МСДН (Mongolian)
- Chairman: Adiyagiin Ganbaatar
- General Secretary: Losolyn Byambajargal
- Founder: Bat-Erdeniin Batbayar; Radnaasümbereliin Gonchigdorj
- Founded: 2 March 1990; 19 December 2004 (refounded)
- Registered: 20 January 2005
- Headquarters: Ulaanbaatar
- Membership (2024): 3,000
- Ideology: Social democracy
- Political position: Centre-left
- Colors: Blue
- State Great Khural: 0 / 126

Party flag
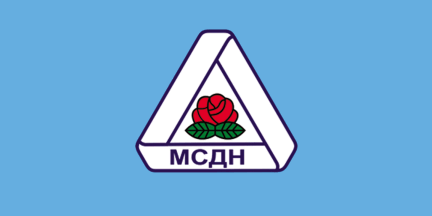

The Mongolian Social Democratic Party (MSDP), (Note: Mongolian: Монголын Социал Демократ Нам (МСДН), Mongoliin Social Demokrat Nam (MSDN)) colloquially referred to as the Socdem Party, (Note: Mongolian: Соцдек Нам, romanized: Socdek Nam) is a center-left political party in Mongolia. Originally established in 1990 during the country's democratic revolution, the MSDP was a part of a coalition that governed Mongolia from 1996 to 2000. An electoral defeat in 2000 led to the party's dissolution and foundation of the Democratic Party.

The MSDP was refounded in 2004 by senior party member, Adiyagiin Ganbaatar. As of August 2026, it remains an extra-parliamentary party with around 3,000 members.

== History ==
=== Founding ===
In the wake of the 1990 Democratic Revolution, the Mongolian Democratic Socialist Movement (Ардчилсан Социалист Хөдөлгөөн, АСХ) was established on 28 December 1989 by several youth intelligentsia, notably writer and historian Bat-Erdeniin Batbayar, known by his nickname as Baabar, Adiyagiin Ganbaatar, Losolyn Byambajargal and Radnaasümbereliin Gonchigdorj. A considerable number of members came from the mathematics and physics departments of National University of Mongolia. The movement issued a public statement on 4 January 1990, and temporary charters were ratified by a meeting of activists on 15 January 1990. The Democratic Socialist Movement was one of the four political organizations that led the revolution. Ideologically, the movement found mutual understanding with some members of the Mongolian Democratic Union, who wanted to establish socialism in its true sense.

The Mongolian Social Democratic Party was founded on 2 March 1990; the second opposition party after the Mongolian Democratic Party. On 31 March 1990, the MSDP convened its first party congress and elected Baabar as party chairman. During the party congress, Baabar criticized communism and marxism–leninism as "inherently inhumane" and "when implemented in practice, would create an involuntary system of oppression."

=== Political developments ===
In the 1990 parliamentary election, the MSDP was one of the five political parties which ran for the 430 seats in the People's Great Khural. The party won 4 seats in the Great Khural and 5.48% of the total party vote, ranking fourth place overall. The MSDP additionally secured 4 of the 53 seats via proportional representation in the newly established State Little Khural. In September 1990, MSDP politician Radnaasümbereliin Gonchigdorj was appointed as the chairman of the Little Khural and vice-president of the Mongolian People's Republic.

Later in the 1992 election for the first unicameral State Great Khural, the MSDP won a single seat and became an opposition party to the ex-communist Mongolian People's Revolutionary Party (MPRP)'s supermajority. In the lead up to the upcoming election, the party founded the Democratic Union Coalition (DUC) with the Mongolian National Democratic Party (MNDP).

The DUC won a majority of 50 seats in the 76-seat State Great Khural in 1996, leaving the MPRP with 25 seats. Out of the fifty seats, the MNDP won 34 seats and the MSDP won 13. DUC campaign manager, Mendsaikhany Enkhsaikhan (MSDP), was appointed as prime minister of the governing coalition and now party chairman Gonchigdorj was elected as parliamentary speaker. Prime minister Enkhsaikhan was ousted by his own coalition and replaced by DUC chairman Tsakhiagiin Elbegdorj (MNDP) in 1998. Following a state-enteprise scandal, Elbegdorj resigned in 1998 and was succeeded by mayor Janlavyn Narantsatsralt (MNDP). In 1999, Narantsatsralt resigned and was replaced by foreign minister Rinchinnyamyn Amarjargal (MNDP), whom served until the next parliamentary elections.

In the months ahead of the June 2000 election, the MSDP split off from the DUC and ran independently. In an upset, the party won zero seats while the DUC (between the MNDP and Mongolian Religious Democratic Party) won a single seat. Consequently, on 6 December 2000, the two parties alongside three other minor parties merged and founded the Democratic Party (DP) following the electoral wipeout. Most of the MSDP except faction of Adiyagiin Ganbaatar joined the Democratic Party.

During the DP's internal factionalism between 2004 and 2006, the MSDP was reformed in December 2004 and was officially registered by the Supreme Court in January 2005. The MSDP ran 19 candidates, but did not win any seats in the 2012 parliamentary elections.

== Leaders ==
- Bat-Erdeniin Batbayar (1991–1994)
- Radnaasümbereliin Gonchigdorj (1994–2000)
- Adiyagiin Ganbaatar (2000–present)

== Electoral history ==
=== Presidential election ===
Election	Party candidate	Votes	%	Result
1993 (Note: Run together with the MNDP.)	Punsalmaagiin Ochirbat	592,836	59.89%	Elected ✓

=== People's Great Khural elections ===
Election	Party leader	Votes	%	Seats	+/–	Position	Government
1990	Bat-Erdeniin Batbayar	53,545	5.48%	People's Great Khural 4 / 430 State Little Khural 3 / 50	New	4th	Opposition

=== State Great Khural elections ===
Election	Party leader	Votes	%	Seats	+/–	Position	Government
1992	Bat-Erdeniin Batbayar	304,648	10.08%	1 / 76	▼3	▲3rd	Opposition
1996 (Note: Run as part of the Democratic Union.)	Radnaasümbereliin Gonchigdorj	475,267	47.05%	13 / 76	▲13	▲1st	Coalition government
2000	Radnaasümbereliin Gonchigdorj	91,663	9.14%	0 / 76	▼13	▼4th	Extra-parliamentary
2004 (Note: Run as part of the Motherland Democratic Coalition.)	Merged into the Democratic Party			35 / 76	—	▲1st	Governing coalition
2008 (Note: Run as part of the Civic Coalition.)	Adiyagiin Ganbaatar	24,806	1.43	0 / 76	Steady	4th	Extra-parliamentary
2012	Adiyagiin Ganbaatar	2,041	0.18%	0 / 76	Steady	▼11th	Extra-parliamentary
2016	Adiyagiin Ganbaatar	5,308	0.38%	0 / 76	Steady	▲9th	Extra-parliamentary
2020 (Note: Run as part of the Right Person Electorate Coalition.)	Adiyagiin Ganbaatar	209,104	5.23%	0 / 76	Steady	▲5th	Opposition
2024	Adiyagiin Ganbaatar	1,531	0.11%	0 / 126	Steady	▼19th	Extra-parliamentary
