= Mongolian Democratic Union =

Political movement in Mongolia

- Монголын Ардчилсан Холбоо
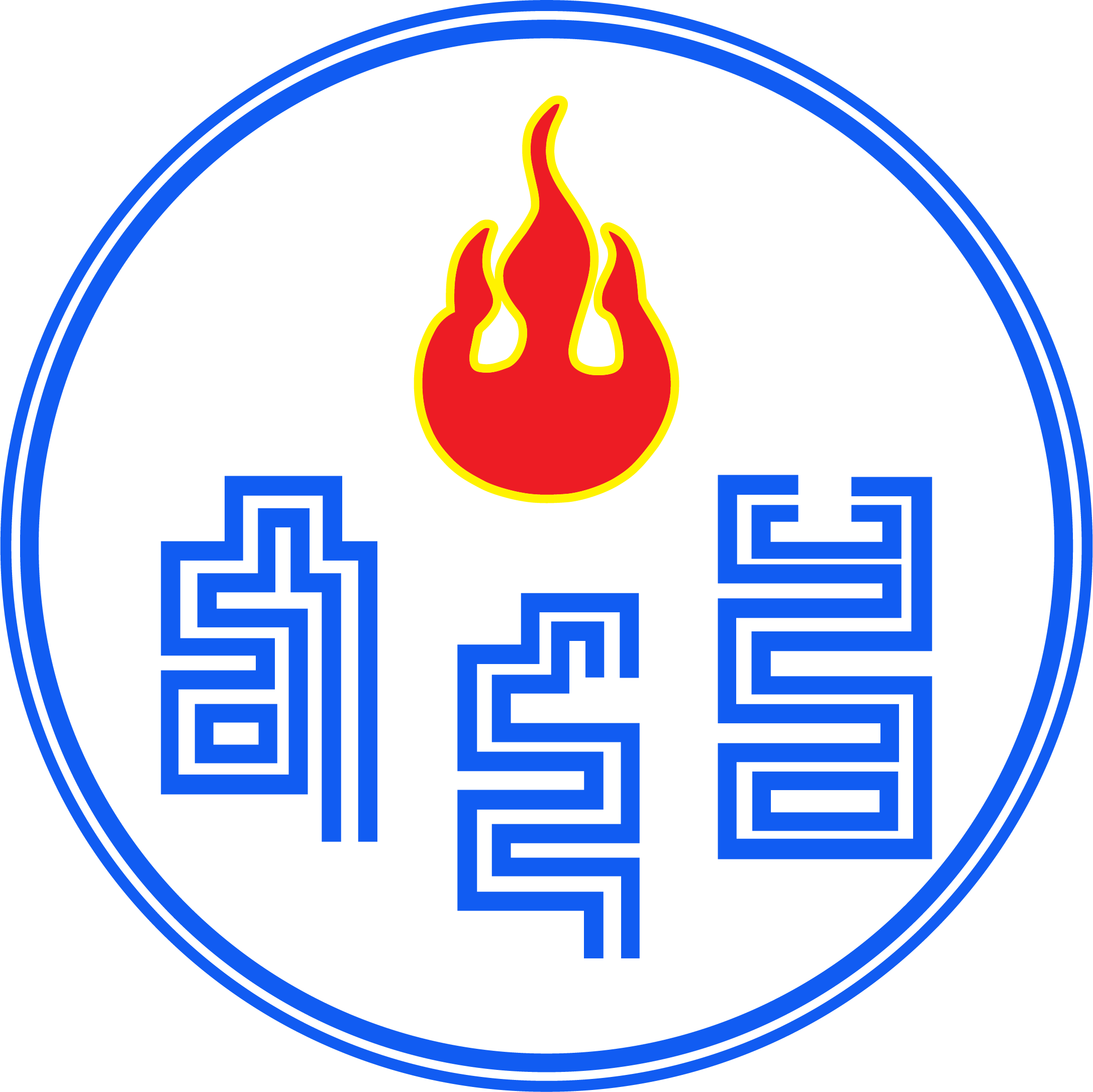
- Logo of the MDU

- Flag of the MDU
- Abbreviation: MDU (English); МоАХ (Mongolian)
- Formation: 10 December 1989; 36 years ago
- Founder: Sanjaasürengiin Zorig
- Founded at: Ulaanbaatar
- Type: NGO
- Headquarters: Palace of Democracy, Sükhbaatar district, Ulaanbaatar
- Region served: Mongolia
- Chairperson: Khaltmaagiin Battulga

The Mongolian Democratic Union (MDU) (Mongolian: Монголын Ардчилсан Холбоо, romanized: Mongolyn Ardchilsan Kholboo) is a Mongolian political movement, nonprofit, and non-governmental organization founded in 1989. It was the first democratic movement to challenge the dominance of the Mongolian People's Revolutionary Party, which ruled the Mongolian People's Republic as the sole legal party from 1921 until 1990.

In February 1990, the MDU established the Mongolian Democratic Party, the first and foremost opposition party from 1990 to 1992, which later on merged into the modern Democratic Party.

== History ==
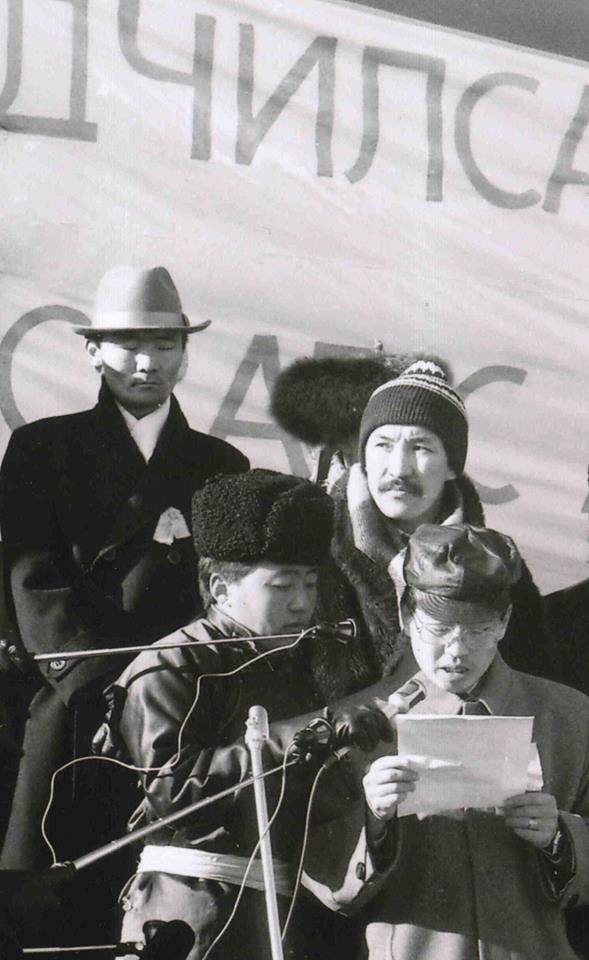
The first public demonstrations in Ulaanbaatar, December 1989

During the unravelling of the 1989 Revolutions in Eastern Europe, a group of 300 young Mongolian intellectuals gathered and held the first open pro-democracy demonstrations in front of the Youth Cultural Center in Ulaanbaatar on 10 December. It announced the foundation of the Mongolian Democratic Union, the first opposition political force to challenge the country's socialist one-party system, which had ruled since the 1921 People's Revolution.

At the same meeting, the newly formed MDU presented 13 demands to the communist regime, which included ceding political power, allowing a democratic multi-party system of government, granting citizens civil rights, and enforcing freedom of the press. This demonstration is widely seen as the start of the 1990 Democratic Revolution. Sanjaasürengiin Zorig became the MDU's founding chairperson and a key figure during the revolution.

On 18 February 1990, the MDU convened its first conference and announced the establishment of the Mongolian Democratic Party (MDP), the first opposition political party advocating political and economic reform. The resignation of the Politburo in March paved the way to Mongolia's first free and fair election on 22 July 1990, in which the MDP won 16 seats in the People's Great Khural and 13 seats in the newly established lower chamber, State Little Khural. The MDP would merge into the Mongolian National Democratic Party in 1992 and later the Democratic Party in 2000.

The MDU was awarded Hero of Mongolia by President Khaltmaagiin Battulga on 24 June 2021.
