= Mongolian National Progress Party =

Political party in Mongolia (1990–1992)

Mongolian National Progress Party Монголын Үндэсний Дэвшлийн Нам
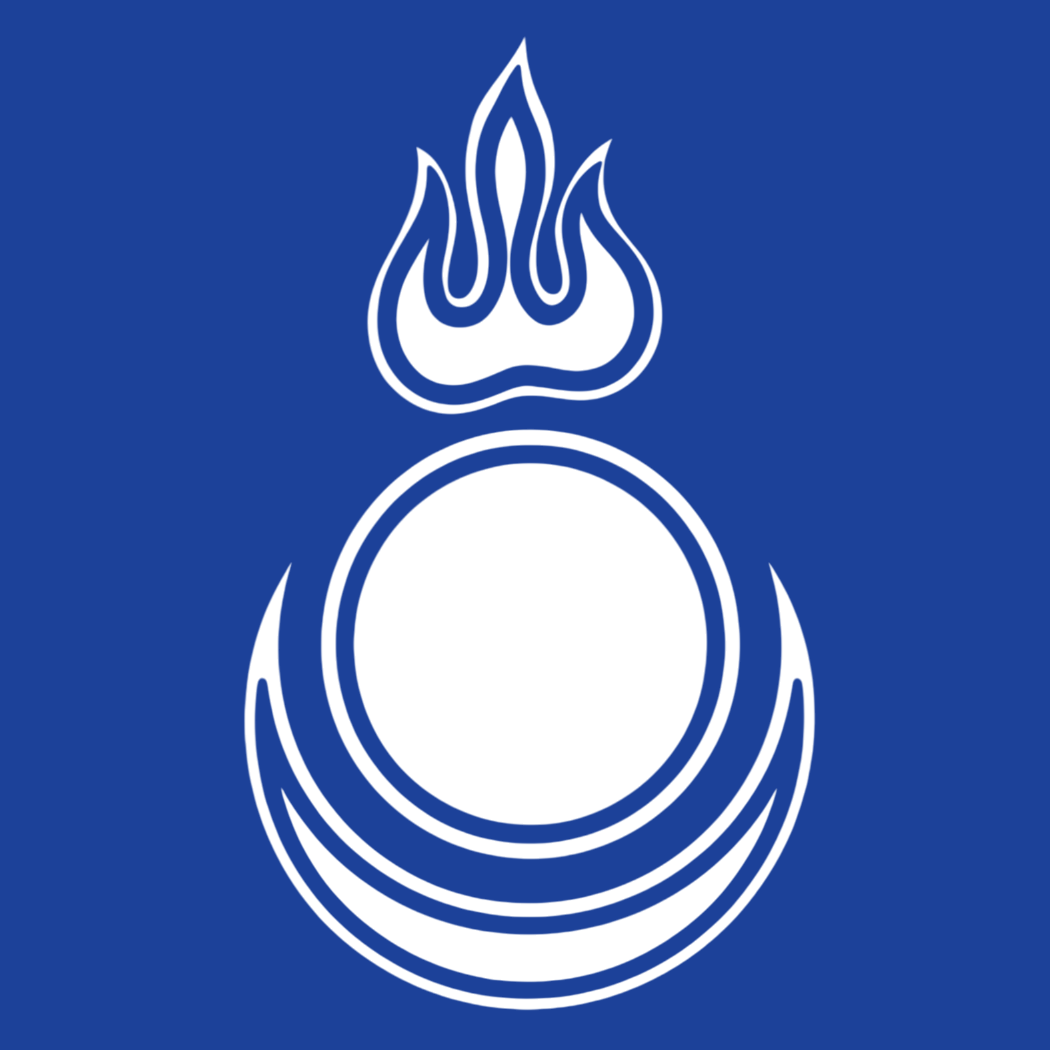
- A fire, sun and moon crescent was used as the party symbol.
- Abbreviation: MNPP (English); МҮДН (Mongolian)
- Chairperson: Davaadorjiin Ganbold
- Founded: 11 March 1990
- Dissolved: 25 October 1992
- Merged into: Mongolian National Democratic Party
- Headquarters: Ulaanbaatar
- Ideology: Reformism; Economic liberalism
- Political position: Centre
- Colors: Blue
- State Great Khural (1992–1996): 4 / 76

Mongolian National Progress Party, also translated as Mongolian National Progressive Party and shortened as MNPP (Mongolian: Монголын Үндэсний Дэвшлийн Нам, romanized: Mongolyn Ündesniy Devshliyn Nam, abbr. MYДH), was a political party in Mongolia that existed from 1990 to 1992. Davaadorjiin Ganbold served as the first and only party chairman. In late 1992, the party merged with the Mongolian Democratic Party and the Mongolian United Party to establish the Mongolian National Democratic Party, which later became one of the founding parties of the current Democratic Party of Mongolia.

== History ==
=== Foundation ===
In September 1988, foreign-educated economists working in financial institutions formed the "Young Economists' Club". Later in December, the "Harmony Union" was established with around 20 members.

During the 1989 peaceful demonstrations, the New Progressive Movement (Mongolian: Шинэ дэвшилт хөдөлгөөн, romanized: Shine devshilt khodolgoon), in support of the newly-established Mongolian Democratic Union (MDU), was formed in December 1989. The members secretly met under the name "Economists' Harmony Club" at the Polytechnic University of Mongolia. The movement meetings primarily comprised young economists and professors from a variety of financial and academic institutions.

On 17 February 1990, during the first conference of the MDU, the New Progressive Union (NPU) (Mongolian: Шинэ дэвшилт холбоо, romanized: Shine devshilt kholboo) was established with the merger of the Harmony Union and the New Progressive Movement, alongside the Democratic Socialist Movement and the Mongolian Democratic Party. The Democratic Socialist Movement founded the Mongolian Social Democratic Party on March 2, and the NPU officially established the Mongolian National Progress Party (MNPP) on March 11.

Economist and leading opposition figure Davaadorjiin Ganbold was elected as the MNPP's first and only chairman. After the success of the 1990 revolution, the first party congress was convened in May and discussed the issue of reform, economic liberalization, and green development. A notable party document, titled "Reason to Struggle," was issued during the conference. Around 30 individuals headed the NPU and the MNPP in 1990.

=== Merger with the MDP ===
After the ratification of a new constitution and the establishment of a new unicameral parliament, the 1992 elections for the first State Great Khural were held on 28 June 1992. The MNPP ran together with the Mongolian Democratic Party (MDP) and the Mongolian United Party (MUP), winning 4 out of 76 seats in the State Great Khural. In the aftermath of the election, the MNPP merged with the MDP, the MUP and the Mongolian Renaissance Party, founding the Mongolian National Democratic Party (MNDP) on 25 October.

== Electoral history ==
=== People's Great Khural elections ===
| Election | Party leader | Votes | % | Seats | +/– | Position | Government |
|---|---|---|---|---|---|---|---|
| 1990 | Davaadorjiin Ganbold | 57,691 | 5.90% | People's Great Khural 6 / 430 State Little Khural 3 / 50 | New | 3rd | Unity government |

=== State Great Khural elections ===
| Election | Party leader | Votes | % | Seats | +/– | Position | Government |
|---|---|---|---|---|---|---|---|
| 1992 (Note: Run together with the Mongolian Democratic Party and the Mongolian United Party.) | Davaadorjiin Ganbold | 528,393 | 17.49% | 4 / 76 | ▲4 | 2nd | Opposition |

== See also ==
- Politics of Mongolia
- Mongolian Revolution of 1990
- Democratic Party (Mongolia)
- List of political parties in Mongolia
