= Mongolian National Democratic Party (1992–2000) =

Political party in Mongolia (1992–2000)

Mongolian National Democratic Party Монголын Үндэсний Ардчилсан Нам
- Abbreviation: MNDP (English); МҮАН (Mongolian)
- Founded: 25 October 1992
- Dissolved: 6 December 2000
- Merger of: Mongolian Democratic Party; Mongolian National Progress Party; Mongolian United Party; Mongolian Renaissance Party
- Merged into: Democratic Party
- Headquarters: Ulaanbaatar
- Ideology: Conservatism; Liberalism; Economic liberalism; Mongolian nationalism
- Political position: Centre-right
- National affiliation: Democratic Union (1996–2000)
- International affiliation: International Democracy Union (1994–2000)
- Colors: Blue
- State Great Khural (1996–2000): 34 / 76

Party flag

The Mongolian National Democratic Party (MNDP; Mongolian: Монголын Үндэсний Ардчилсан Нам, romanized: Mongolyn Ündesniy Ardchilsan Nam) was a Mongolian political party established in October 1992 with the merger of the Mongolian National Progress Party, the Mongolian Democratic Party, the Mongolian United Party, and the Mongolian Renaissance Party.

== History ==
=== Founding ===
During the 1992 parliamentary election, the opposition alliance, comprising the Mongolian Democratic Party (MDP), the Mongolian National Progress Party (MNPP), and the Mongolian United Party (MUP), won 4 seats in the newly established State Great Khural. The ex-communist Mongolian People's Revolutionary Party (MPRP) won an overwhelming landslide victory, taking 70 of the 76 seats.

On 25 October 1992, the MDP led by Mendsaikhany Enkhsaikhan, the MNPP led by Davaadorjiin Ganbold, the MUP led by Sanjaasürengiin Zorig, and the Mongolian Renaissance Party led by Kinayatyn Zardykhan and Tserendashiin Tsolmon merged to form the Mongolian National Democratic Party (MNDP). It claimed to represent both conservative and liberal positions. Ganbold was elected the first chairman of the MNDP.

The MNDP became a full member of the centre-right International Democracy Union on 27 March 1994.

=== Democratic Union Coalition ===
Prior to the 1996 elections, the MNDP formed the Democratic Union Coalition with the Mongolian Social Democratic Party (MSDP) and the MGP on 26 February 1996. Tsakhiagiin Elbegdorj, a prominent figure of the 1990 revolution, was elected the next chairperson of the MNDP at the party's second conference on 5 April 1996. In the subsequent June elections, the DUC won 50 seats, 34 of which had belonged to the MNDP, in the 1996 parliamentary election. The ruling MPRP was out of power for the first time in Mongolia's modern history since 1921.

In the 2000 parliamentary election, the DUC faced an electoral wipeout, losing 49 of its previous seats to the MPRP, after four years of frequent political crises and internal disputes. On 6 December 2000, the MNDP merged with the MSDP, the Mongolian Democratic Renaissance Party, and the Mongolian Religious Democratic Party into the modern-day Democratic Party (Mongolian: Ардчилсан Нам, romanized: Ardchilsan Nam).

== Leaders ==
- Davaadorjiin Ganbold (1992–1996)
- Tsakhiagiin Elbegdorj (1996–1998)
- Janlavyn Narantsatsralt (1998–1999)
- Rinchinnyamyn Amarjargal (1999–2000)

== Electoral history ==
=== State Great Khural elections ===
Election	Party leader	Votes	%	Seats	+/–	Position	Government
1996 (Note: Run as part of the Democratic Union.)	Tsakhiagiin Elbegdorj	475,267	47.05%	34 / 76	New	▲1st	Governing coalition
2000 (Note: Run as part of the Democratic Union.)	Rinchinnyamyn Amarjargal	133,890	13.35%	1 / 76	▼49	▼2nd	Opposition

== See also ==
- Politics of Mongolia
- Mongolian Revolution of 1990
- Democratic Party (Mongolia)
- List of political parties in Mongolia
