= Little Khural =

Presidium of the Mongolian People's Republic (1924–1951; 1990–1992)

State Little Khural Улсын Бага Хурал ᠤᠯᠤᠰ ᠤᠨ ᠪᠠᠭ᠎ᠠ ᠬᠤᠷᠠᠯ
- Mongolian People's Republic
- State emblem

Type
- Type: Lower house of the People's Great Khural

History
- Founded: 1924 (first) 13 September 1990 (second)
- Disbanded: 1951 (first) 28 June 1992 (second)
- Succeeded by: State Great Khural

Leadership
- Chairman: Peljidiin Genden, MPRP (first)
- Radnaasümbereliin Gonchigdorj, MSDP (last)
- Seats: 30–45 (1924–1950); 53 (Note: Including the vice president, deputy chairman, and secretary) (1990–1992)

Elections
- Voting system: Proportional representation
- Last election: 29 July 1990

Meeting place
- Main Conference Room; Government Palace, Ulaanbaatar

Constitution
- Constitution of the Mongolian People's Republic

The Little Khural (Note: Mongolian: Бага Хурал, romanized: Baga Khural, IPA: [paq ˈχʊrăɮ]) or the State Little Khural (Note: Mongolian: Улсын Бага Хурал, romanized: Ulsiin Baga Khural, IPA: [ʊɮˈsiɴ paq ˈχʊrăɮ]) was the supreme state organ of power between sessions of the Great Khural in the Mongolian People's Republic from 1924 until 1951 and then the standing legislature from 1990 to 1992. The Little Khural was created in May 1990, following a directive by the People's Great Khural during Mongolia's 1990 Democratic Revolution. Its members were appointed in September 1990 by the Great Khural after the country's first-ever multi-party elections in July 1990.

After the adoption of the 1992 Constitution of Mongolia and subsequent elections for the first State Great Khural, the Little Khural was dissolved and succeeded by the State Great Khural on 28 June 1992.

== History ==
=== 1924–1950 ===
After the ratification of the 1924 Constitution and the establishment of the Mongolian People's Republic, the Little Khural was established, consisting of thirty members elected from the lower Great Khural. The Presidium of the Little Khural, a standing organ originally consisting of five members, was also established. The chairman of the presidium was in effect the head of state, and the Little Khural elected the prime minister.

The first session of the Little Khural began on 29 November 1924. It originally met two to three times a year, but in the 1930s, during the Stalinist repressions in Mongolia, this rate dwindled to once every two or three years. After 1937, it had only three members. Towards the end of World War II, in solidarity with the Soviet Union, the Little Khural declared war against the Empire of Japan on 10 August 1945. The Little Khural held its 32nd and last session in February 1950. In 1951, Mongolia amended its constitution and abolished the Little Khural in favor of the unicameral People's Great Khural.

=== 1990–1992 ===
During the 1990 Democratic Revolution, the 1960 Constitution was amended in May 1990 to end one-party rule. a standing legislative body from the existing People's Great Khural. This new State Little Khural was to consist of 50 representatives selected by the Great Khural. Three-quarters of these members had to be chosen from among the 430 members of the Great Khural. The seats in the Little Khural were apportioned among the parties that participated in the 1990 legislative elections, the first multi-party elections to be held in Mongolia. One seat equaled 5% of the total party vote.

==== 1990 legislative elections ====
On 22-29 July 1990, the ruling Mongolian People's Revolutionary Party (MPRP) secured 343 seats, the Mongolian Democratic Party (MDP) 23 seats, the Mongolian National Progress Party (MNPP) 7 seats, the Mongolian Social Democratic Party (MSDP) 4 seats, the Mongolian Free Labour Party 1 seat, and independents 51 seats. The newly elected Great Khural was sworn in on 3 September 1990, the same day its first session convened. During its first session, the People's Great Khural elected Radnaasümbereliin Gonchigdorj (MSDP) as chairman (also ex officio vice president), Kinayatyn Zardykhan (MPRP) as deputy chairman, Byaraagiin Chimid (MPRP) as secretary, along with the remaining 50 representatives to the Little Khural. Out of the 50 members, 38 were deputies to the People's Great Khural.

Composition of the Little Khural
Party	Acronym	State Little Khural (Note: At commencement)
Mongolian People's Revolutionary Party	MPRP МАХН	31 / 53
Mongolian Democratic Party	MDP МоАН	13 / 53
Mongolian National Progress Party	MNPP МҮДН	3 / 53
Mongolian Social Democratic Party	MSDP МСДН	4 / 53
Total		53
Source: Nohlen et el., GEC, State Great Khural

The first session of the State Little Khural was held on 13 September 1990, with 53 members. The standing legislature met twice annually in 75-day sessions. At its final fifth session, the Little Khural ratified more than 10 new laws, including the Law on State Great Khural Elections and the Law on the State Great Khural, and forwarded 15 draft laws to the incoming State Great Khural before its dissolution. The Little Khural transferred its role to the newly elected unicameral State Great Khural after the June 1992 parliamentary election in June 1992.

== See also ==
- Constitutions of the Mongolian People's Republic
- People's Great Khural
- Vice President of the Mongolian People's Republic
