= Sükhbaatar Square =

Central square in the Mongolian capital of Ulaanbaatar

- Public square
- Mongolian: Сүхбаатарын талбай ᠰᠦᠬᠡᠪᠠᠭᠠᠲᠤᠷ ᠤᠨ ᠲᠠᠯᠠᠪᠠᠢ
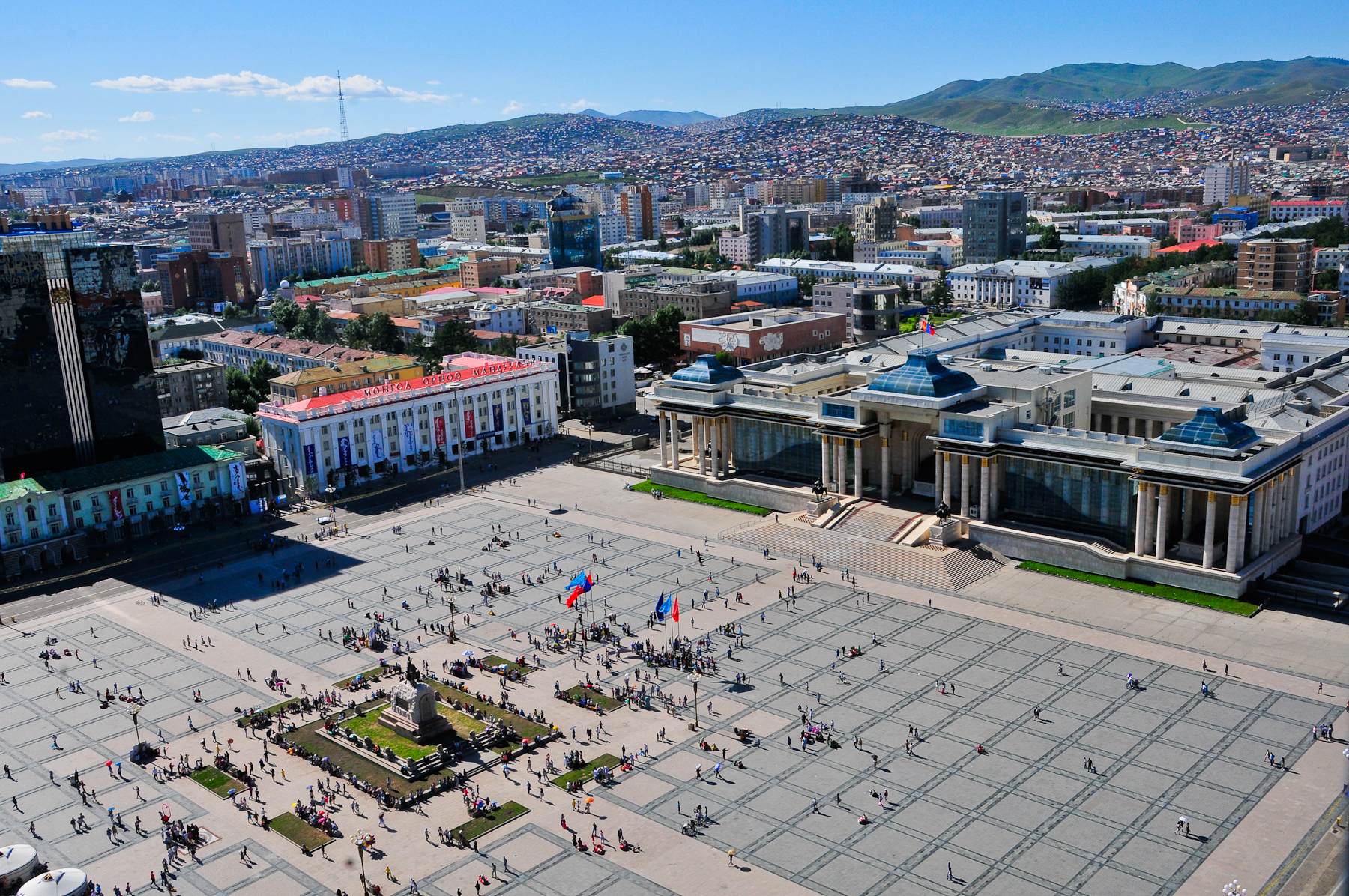
- Aerial view of Sükhbaatar Square, 2015
- Surface: Concrete
- Location: Sükhbaatar, Ulaanbaatar, Mongolia
- Interactive map of Sükhbaatar Square
- Coordinates: 47°55′08″N 106°55′03″E

Sükhbaatar Square (Note: Mongolian: Сүхбаатарын талбай, romanized: Sükhbaataryn talbai, pronounced [suxpáːtʰə̆riɴ tʰaɮpɛ́ː]) is the central square of Ulaanbaatar, the capital of Mongolia. The square was named for Mongolian revolutionary hero Damdin Sükhbaatar after his death in 1923, and features a monumental equestrian statue of him in its center.

The Government Palace, built in 1951, is located to the north of the square, and has a large colonnade monument containing statues of Genghis Khan in the centre, with Ögedei Khan and Kublai Khan to the left and right. The central statue of Genghis Khan is flanked by smaller statues of Bo'orchu and Muqali.

The square's name was changed to Chinggis Square (Mongolian: Чингисийн талбай, pronounced Chinggisiin Talbai) in 2013 in honor of Genghis Khan, but the original name was restored in 2016.

== History ==
=== Late 19th century and early 20th century ===
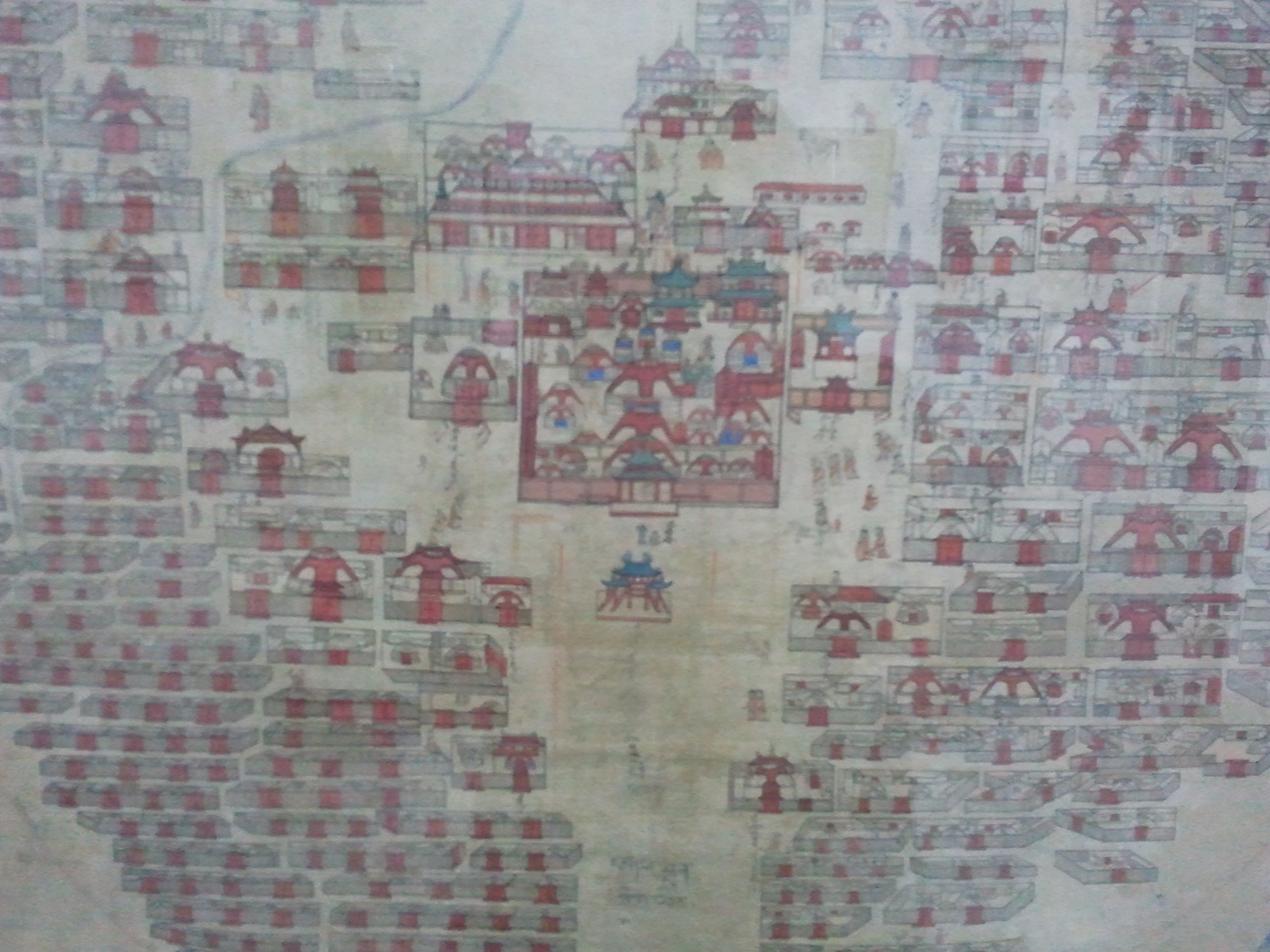
19th-century painting of the Zuun Khuree Monastery located on the present-day Sükhbaatar Square

==== Yellow Palace ====
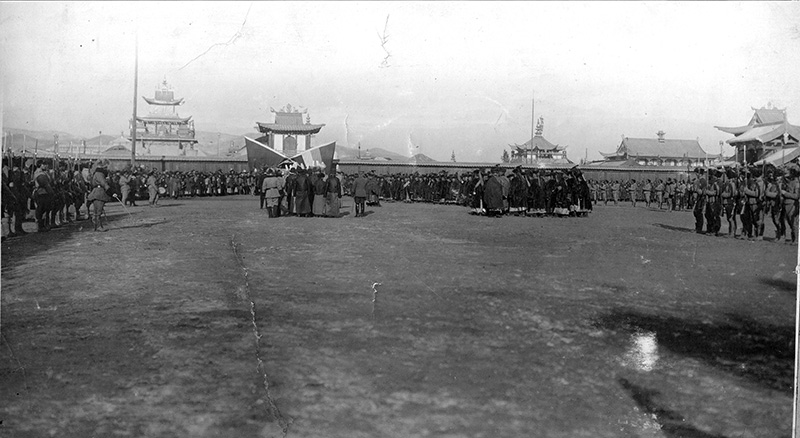
The Yellow Palace as backdrop to the ceremony marking the abolition of Mongolian autonomy by the Republic of China, 1920

Throughout the late 19th and early 20th centuries, the grounds of the present-day government palace and public square were largely occupied by a temple-monastery-palace complex (the Yellow Palace or шар ордон), which acted as the official residence of Mongolia's spiritual leader, the Jebtsundamba Khutughtu. The temple and its environs were called Zuun Khuree or Eastern Monastery to differentiate it from the Gandantegchinlen Monastery and its surrounding settlements to the west. An open-air field was located just south of the temple complex and was surrounded on all sides by rough-hewn wooden fences and prayer wheels. Beyond that stood temples, residences of the nobility and clergy as well as the Baruun Damnuurchin markets. At the south end of the square stood a red imperial arch with green tiled eaves built in erected in 1883.

Mongolian wrestling and Tsam dances were often staged there in the presence of nobles and clergy. Over time, it devolved into a dumping ground of the growing city's refuse. The Bogd Khan would sometimes be seen passing along its edge on his royal procession.

==== Statue of D.Sükhbaatar ====
The temple-complex was razed following the People's Revolution of 1921. In 1923, the central square was named in honor of the Mongolian revolutionary hero Damdin Sükhbaatar after his death that same year. The newspaper "Izvestiya Ulanbator khoto" reported on 15 July 1925, that "in line with Mongolian tradition, the fourth anniversary of the People's Revolution was celebrated with rallies at the square dedicated to D.Sükhbaatar". The current statue of Sükhbaatar on his horse was created in 1946 by the sculptor Sonomyn Choimbol (1907-1970) and is located at the spot where Sükhbaatar's horse allegedly urinated during a rally on 8 July 1921, celebrating the victory of the 1921 revolution. Sükhbaatar's horse urinating was seen as a good omen, and a marker was buried on the spot by a man called "Bonehead" Gavaa.

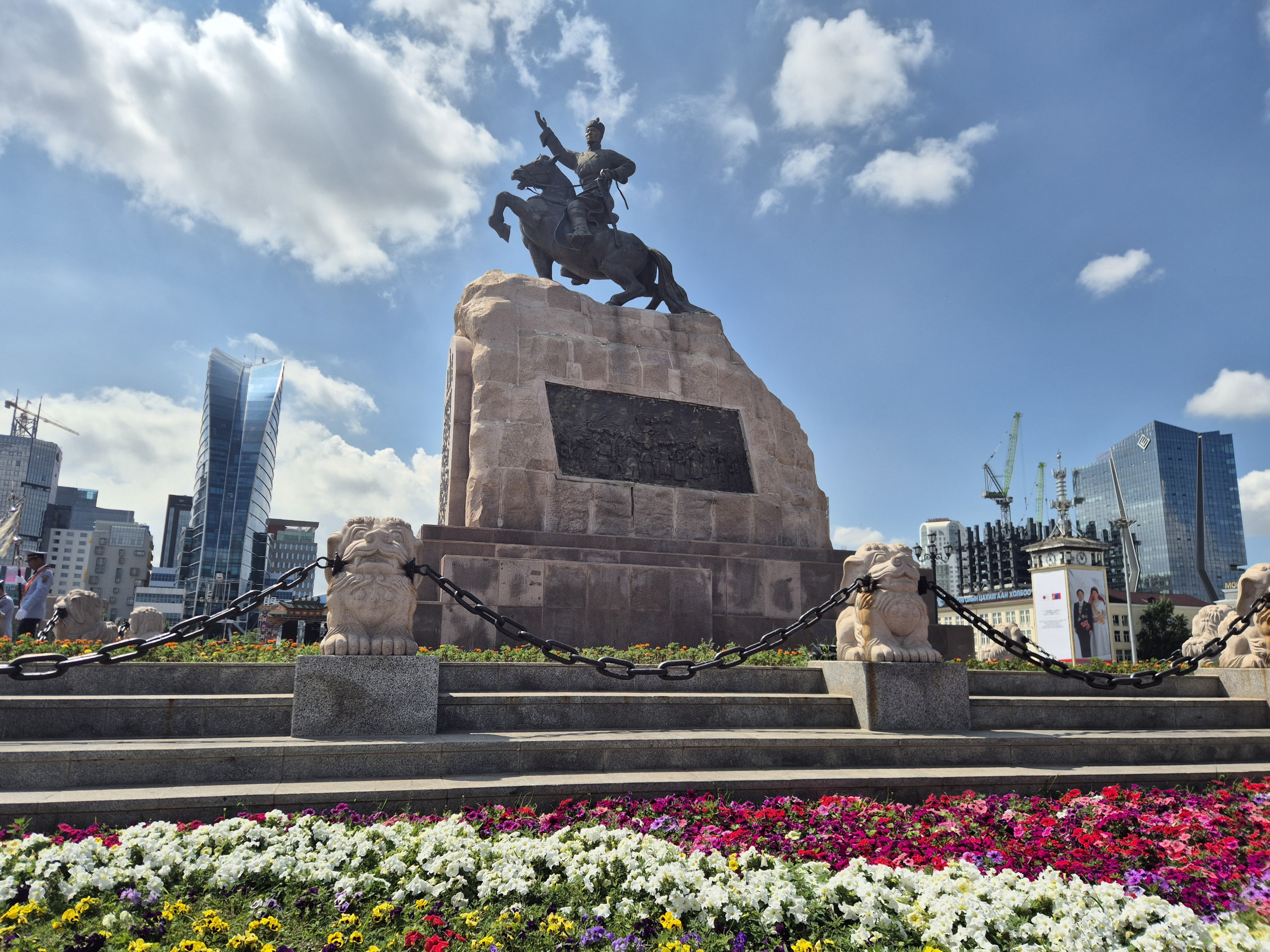
Statue of Damdin Sükhbaatar

In 1946, then-leader of the Mongolian People's Republic, Khorloogiin Choibalsan, had the square paved, had the marker dug out, and chose the spot for Sükhbaatar's statue.

==== National Theater ====
In 1926, the National Theater, also known as the "Green Domed Theater" (Mongolian: Бөмбөгөр ногоон театр), was constructed over the ruins of the temple complex. There, Mongolian operas and dramas were staged, including works from renowned Mongolian playwright Dashdorjiin Natsagdorj. The theater also hosted party conferences and, during the Great Purge of 1937–1939, was the site of show trials where numerous victims were condemned to death.

=== Mid 20th century onwards ===
==== Government Palace and Sükhbaatar's Mausoleum ====
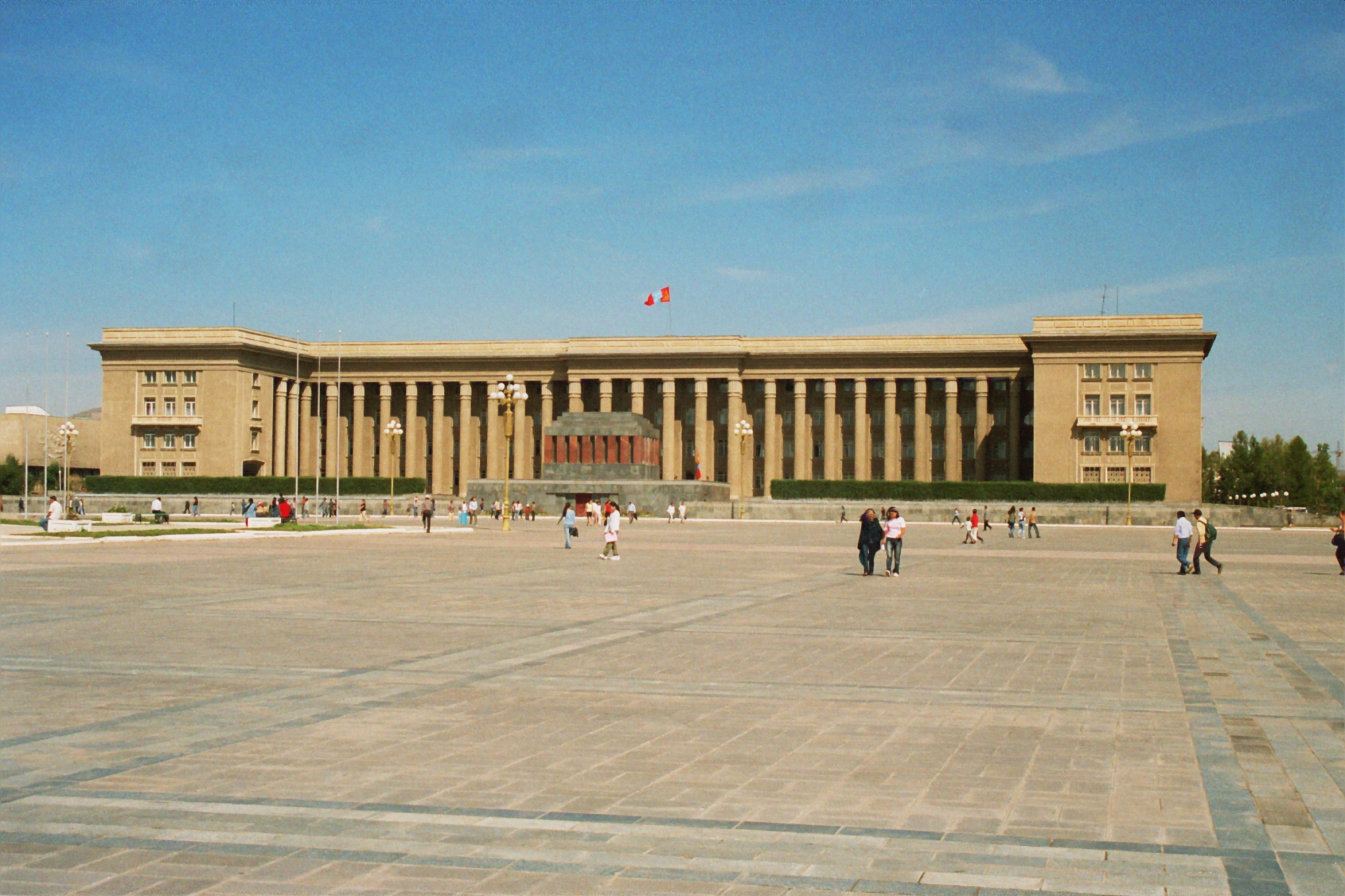
Government Palace with Sükhbaatar's mausoleum in the foreground, as it appeared from 1954 to 2005

After the theater was destroyed by fire in 1949, Mongolia's leader Khorloogiin Choibalsan ordered the construction of the Government Palace on its site in 1951, which still stands today. In 1954, a mausoleum for Mongolia's national hero Damdin Sükhbaatar was built, in part to perpetuate the cult of personality surrounding one of the nations founders. Modeled after Lenin's Mausoleum in Moscow, it stood on the square's north side just in front of the Government Palace. Sükhbaatar's remains were exhumed from Altan Ulgii cemetery and move to the mausoleum in July 1954, shortly thereafter the remains of Choibalsan, who had died in 1952, were also moved to the mausoleum.

During Mongolia's socialist period, Sükhbaatar Square was the scene of annual civil, youth, and military parades until 1989, with party and government leaders standing atop Sükhbaatar's Mausoleum to view parades on May 1, July 11, and November 7 each year. Large parades were also staged for important visitors, such as when Soviet leader Leonid Brezhnev made an official visit to Mongolia in 1966.

The square was the focal point of the Democratic Revolution of 1990 where massive demonstrations and hunger strikes took place. Following the revolution, Mongolia transitioned into a market economy and liberal democracy.

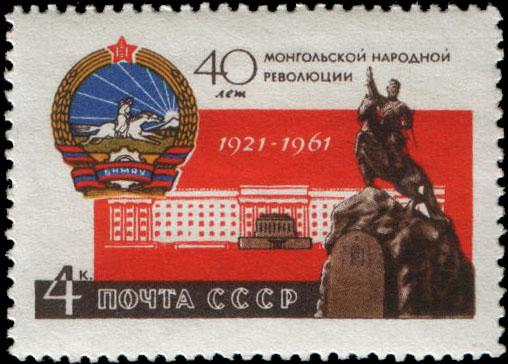
Sükhbaatar Square depicted on a Soviet stamp honoring the 40th anniversary of the 1921 People's Revolution

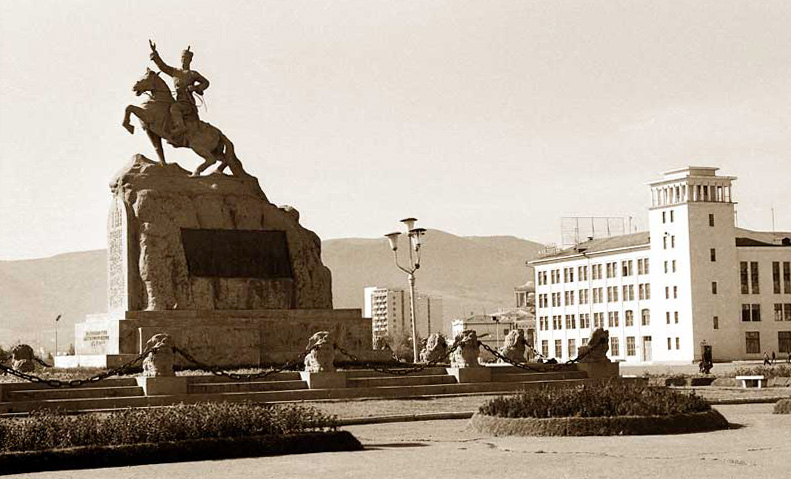
View from Sükhbaatar Square, 1972

Workers' parade at Sükhbaatar Square during Labour Day, circa 1974

State ceremony during the state visit of Nicolae Ceaușescu, 1973

==== Renovations ====
Aerial view of the square and Government Palace in its current state, September 2015

With the abandonment of socialist ideology after the Democratic Revolution and the general development of the city as a result of growth of Mongolia's economy, Sükhbaatar Square underwent dramatic changes, most dramatic of which was the removal of Sükhbaatar's Mausoleum in 2005 and the construction of the colonnade monument to Genghis Khan that replaced it. Between 2005 and 2008, two prominent skyscraper were erected on the squares edges, first the Central Tower and then Blue Sky Tower.

Sükhbaatar Square was also the scene of the violent riots on 1 July 2008, when 5 people were shot dead and many more injured while protesting the parliamentary election results.

==== Name change controversy ====
On July 15, 2013, Ulaanbaatar's City Council, then controlled by the Democratic Party, voted to change the name of Sükhbaatar Square to Chinggis Square in honor of Chinggis Khan, whose statue overlooks the plaza from its colonnade portico on the square's north side. The name-change was a political maneuver by Democrats seeking to disassociate the city's central gathering place from not only the previous socialist regime, but also from the opposition Mongolian People's Party (MPP) that represented the legacy of that era - Damdin Sükhbaatar being one of the founders of the MPP. Following the electoral victory of the MPP in June 2016 the square's name was quickly restored to Sükhbaatar Square.

Panorama of Sükhbaatar Square: Government Palace (direction: N); Central Cultural Palace Building, Mongolian State Academic Theatre of Opera and Ballet, and Central Tower (E). Blue Sky Tower and skyscrapers in downtown Ulaanbaatar (S) can be seen in front of the square, buildings of various institutions, Mongolian Stock Exchange, Golomt Bank, and Mongol Post, flank the western side of the square. Chinggis Khaan National Museum (NW) can be hardly seen.

== Buildings ==
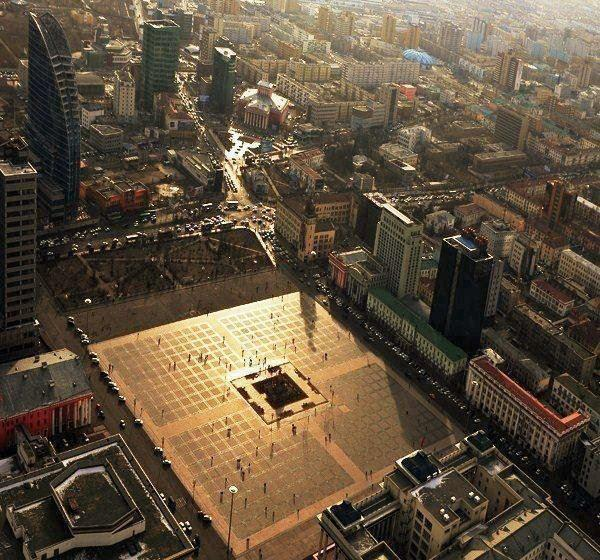
Aerial view of the Sükhbaatar Square, 2016

Government Palace (built in 1951 on the spot formally occupied by the national theater or "Green Domed Theater") dominates the north side of the square. It is fronted by a large colonnade monument to Genghis Khan, Ögedei Khan, and Kublai Khan, completed in 2006 in time for the 800th anniversary of Genghis Khan's coronation. Prior to its demolition in 2005, Sükhbaatar's Mausoleum, the former burial place of Damdin Sükhbaatar and Khorloogiin Choibalsan occupied the area just in front of the Government palace.

On the square's western side sits the headquarters of the Golomt Bank, Ulaanbaatar City Administration building, often referred to by locals at "the Death Star" because of its dark exterior, the headquarters of Golomt Bank, the Mongolian Stock Exchange building (formerly the Eldev-Ochir Cinema: 1946–1948), the Mongolian Telecommunications Building, and the Central Post Office.

The eastern side of the square is flanked by the Central Cultural Palace Building and Mongolian State Academic Theatre of Opera and Ballet, built between 1946 and 1948, and the Central Tower, a glass and metal skyscraper completed in 2008. Just east of the Government Palace, on the square's north-east corner, sits the former home to the State Printing Press, a white two-story building designed by German architect Kavel Maher in the 1920s, which re-opened as the Galleria Ulaanbaatar Shopping Mall in 2018.

To the south sits the old Lenin Club building (built in 1929) located right next to the modern sail shaped skyscraper, Blue Sky Tower. Besides the centrally located Sükhbaatar monument, several other statues dot the square's perimeter including one of former president Jamsrangiin Sambuu on the north-western corner, and another for slain revolutionary leader Sanjaasürengiin Zorig across the intersection on the south-western corner (in front of the Central Post Office).

== Today ==
Today, the square is still the scene of major state ceremonies (including parades in honor of Mongolian State Flag Day or the International Day of United Nations Peacekeepers), cultural events, concerts, and exhibitions. Visiting heads of state, heads of government, and other high-ranking officials generally pay respects in front of the statue of Sükhbaatar and Genghis Khan.

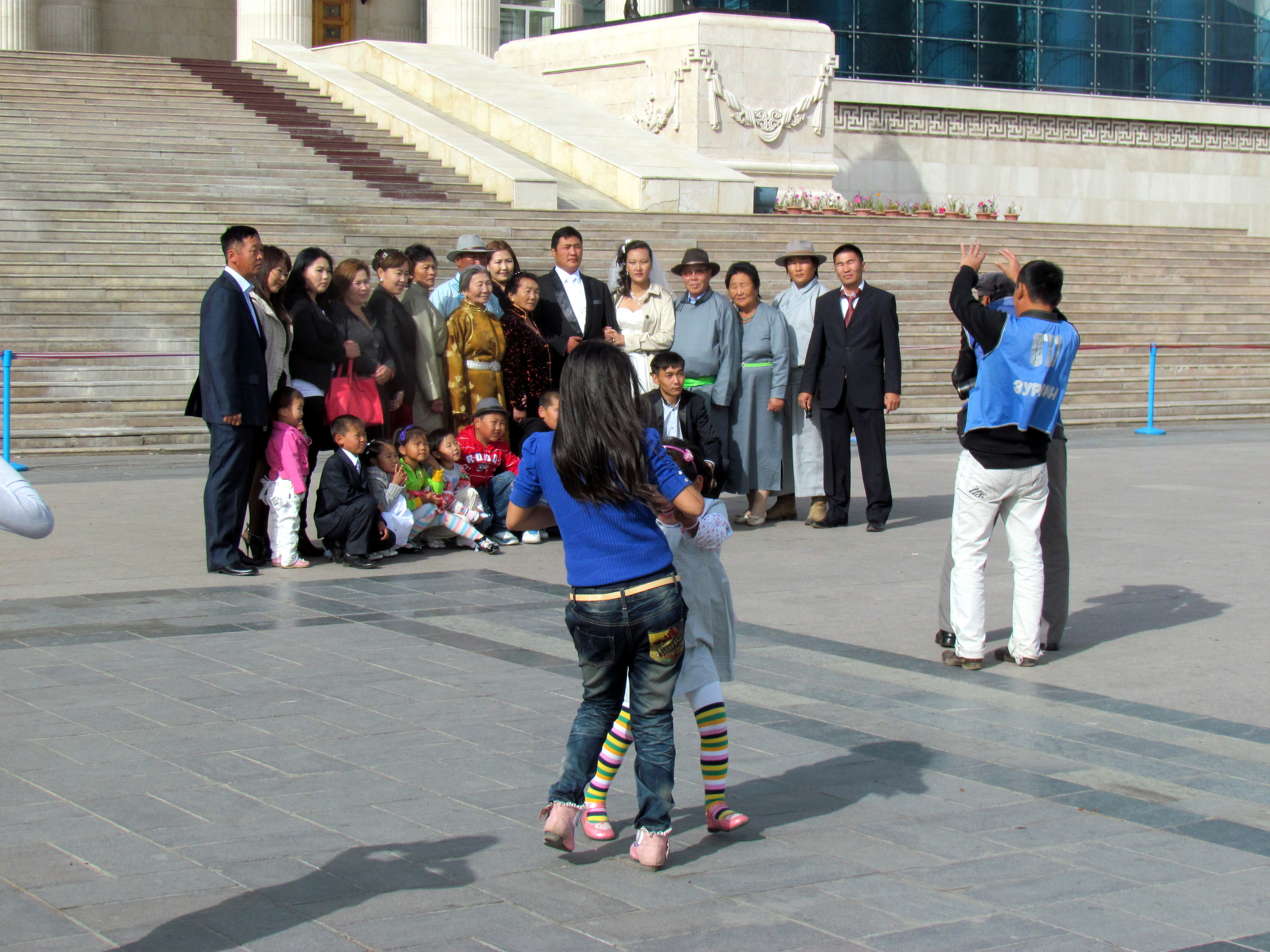
Group photos in front of the statue of Genghis Khan, 2011

Flag raising ceremony at Sükhbaatar Square during Naadam, 2010

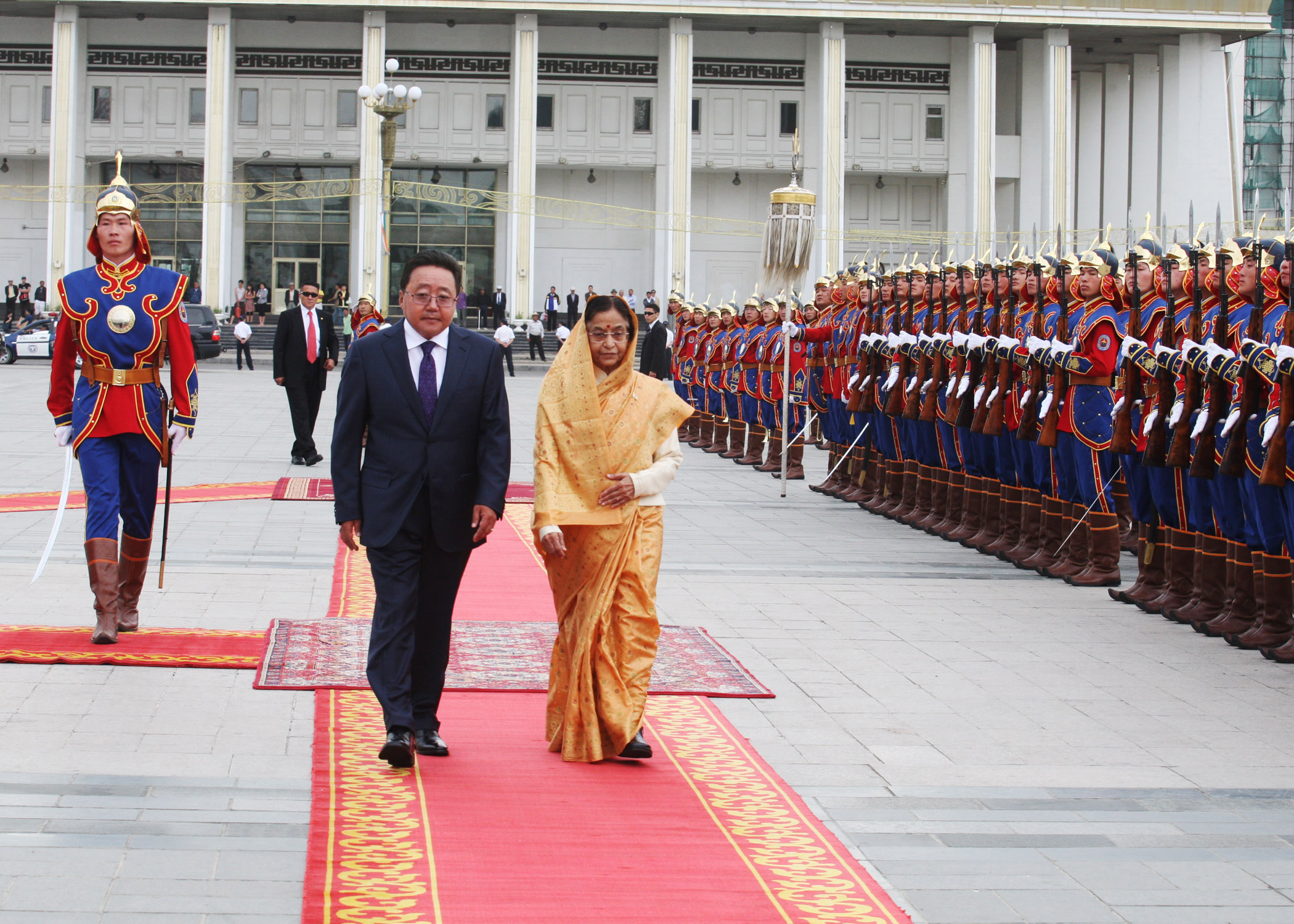
Indian president Pratibha Patil welcomed by Mongolian president Tsakhiagiin Elbegdorj, 2011

Football pitch at Sükhbaatar Square, 2022

Social gathering at Sükhbaatar Square, 2025

Sükhbaatar Square during Ulaanbaatar Marathon, 2025
