= Blue Sky Tower =

Skyscraper in Sükhbaatar, Ulaanbaatar, Mongolia

- Хөх тэнгэр цамхаг
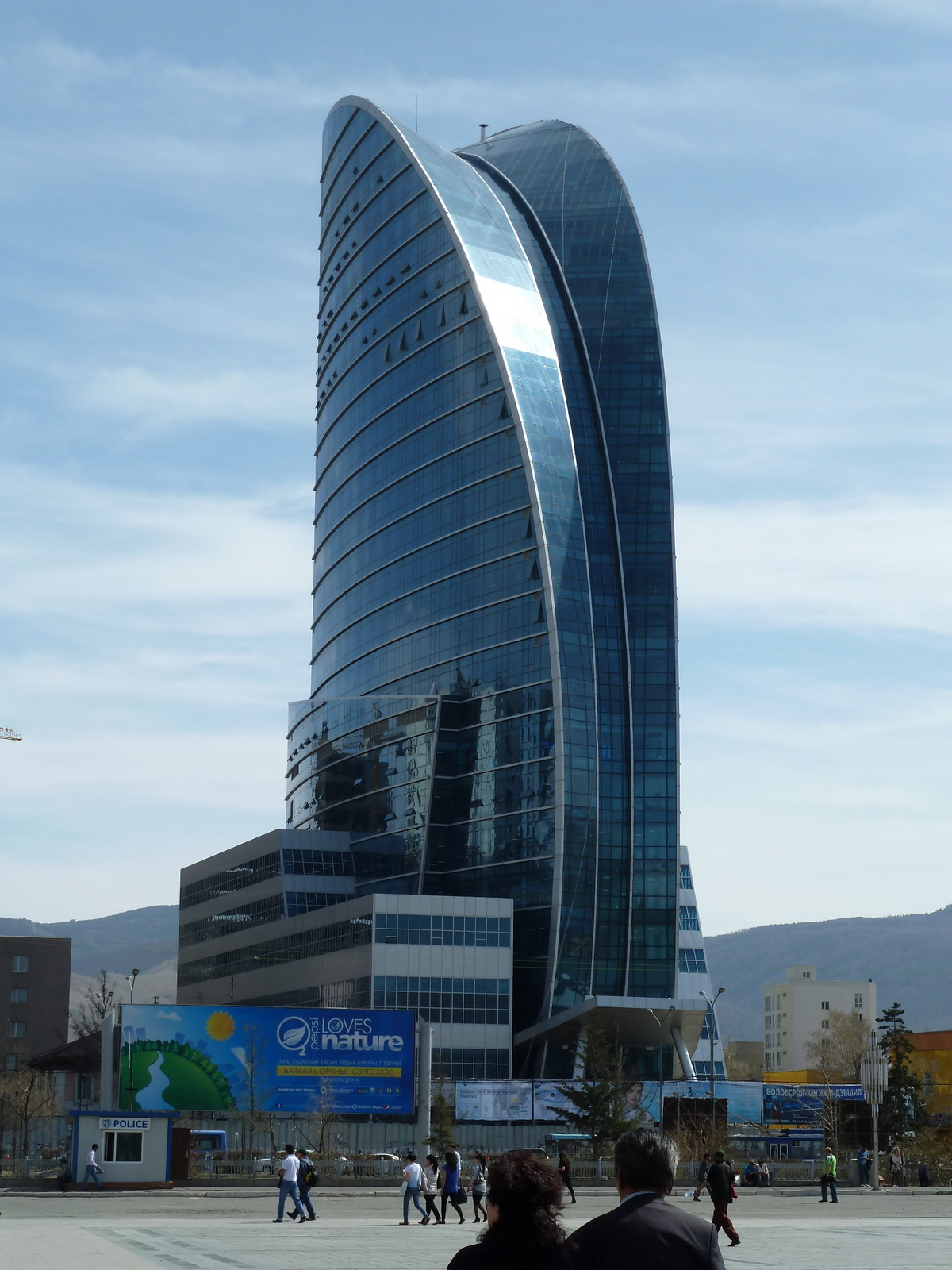
- Blue Sky Tower in May 2011
- Interactive map of the Blue Sky Tower area

General information
- Status: Completed
- Type: Mixed-use
- Location: Peace Avenue 17, Ulaanbaatar, Mongolia
- Coordinates: 47°54′58.8″N 106°55′07.4″E
- Construction started: 2007
- Completed: 2010
- Opened: 2011
- Cost: $200,000,000
- Owner: Blue Sky Asia Co. Ltd.

Height
- Roof: 105 m (344 ft)

Technical details
- Material: Concrete
- Floor count: 25
- Floor area: 40,000 m^{2} (430,556 sq ft)
- Lifts/elevators: 5

Design and construction
- Developer: Chono Group

Website
- https://hotelbluesky.mn/

The Blue Sky Tower (Mongolian: Хөх тэнгэр цамхаг) is a 25-story, 105 m (344 ft) mixed-use skyscraper located directly south of Sükhbaatar Square in Ulaanbaatar, the capital of Mongolia. The skyscraper serves as a prominent landmark and contains a 200-room hotel, luxury apartments, various restaurants, and multiple office and conference spaces.

== History ==
Construction on the skyscraper, designed in cooperation with a South Korean company, began in 2007 but was temporarily suspended during the political tensions that followed Mongolia's legislative election in June 2008. Upon its completion in 2010, the Blue Sky Tower became the first modern glass skyscraper in Mongolia and stood as the second-tallest building in the country, ranking immediately behind the Central Tower, a 107.5 m (353 ft) skyscraper completed in 2009.

== Architecture ==
The skyscraper features a curtain wall of blue-tinted glass, a design choice intended to reference Mongolia's moniker as "the land of the eternal blue sky" while signaling the nation's transparency and openness to international business. Due to its strategic location and unique silhouette, the tower stands as a prominent landmark in the Ulaanbaatar skyline. The design, which resembles a sail or fin, is often compared to the Burj Al Arab in Dubai. Local residents frequently refer to the building as "the meat cleaver" or "the sailboat," often noting the contrast of a sea-themed structure in a landlocked nation.

== Gallery ==
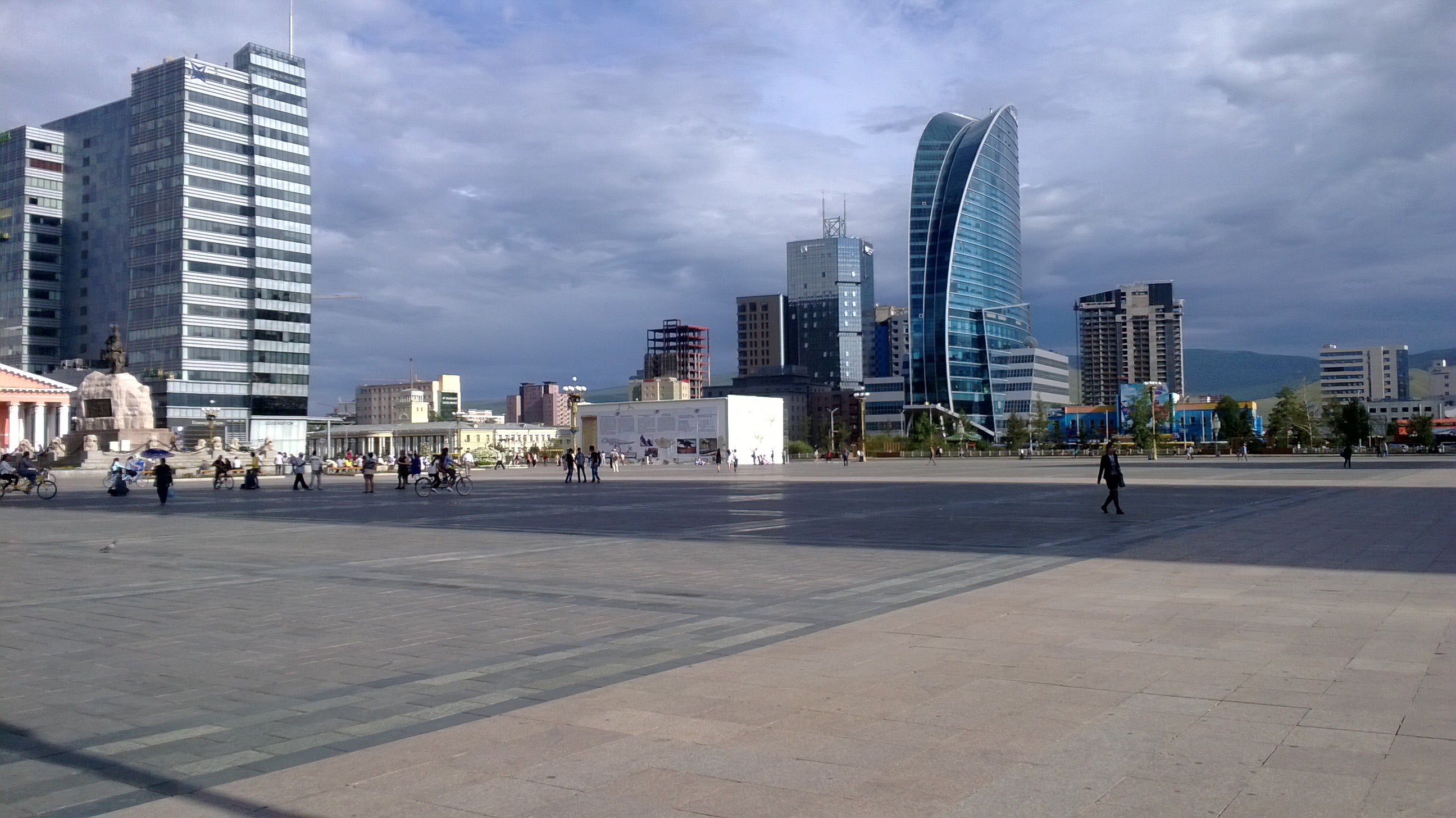
View of Sükhbaatar Square, featuring the Central Tower on the left and the Blue Sky Tower on the right

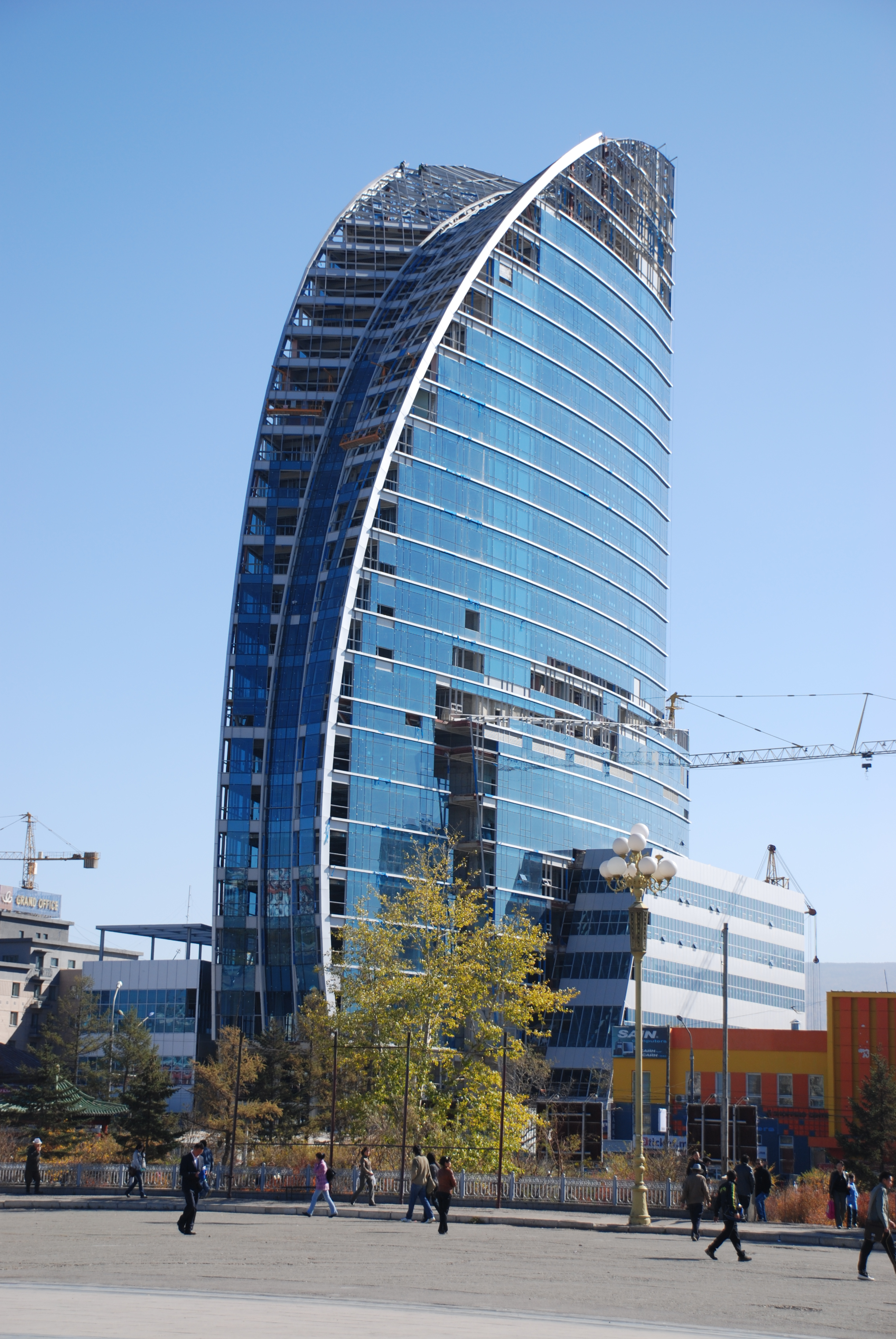
Blue Sky Tower under construction in October 2008

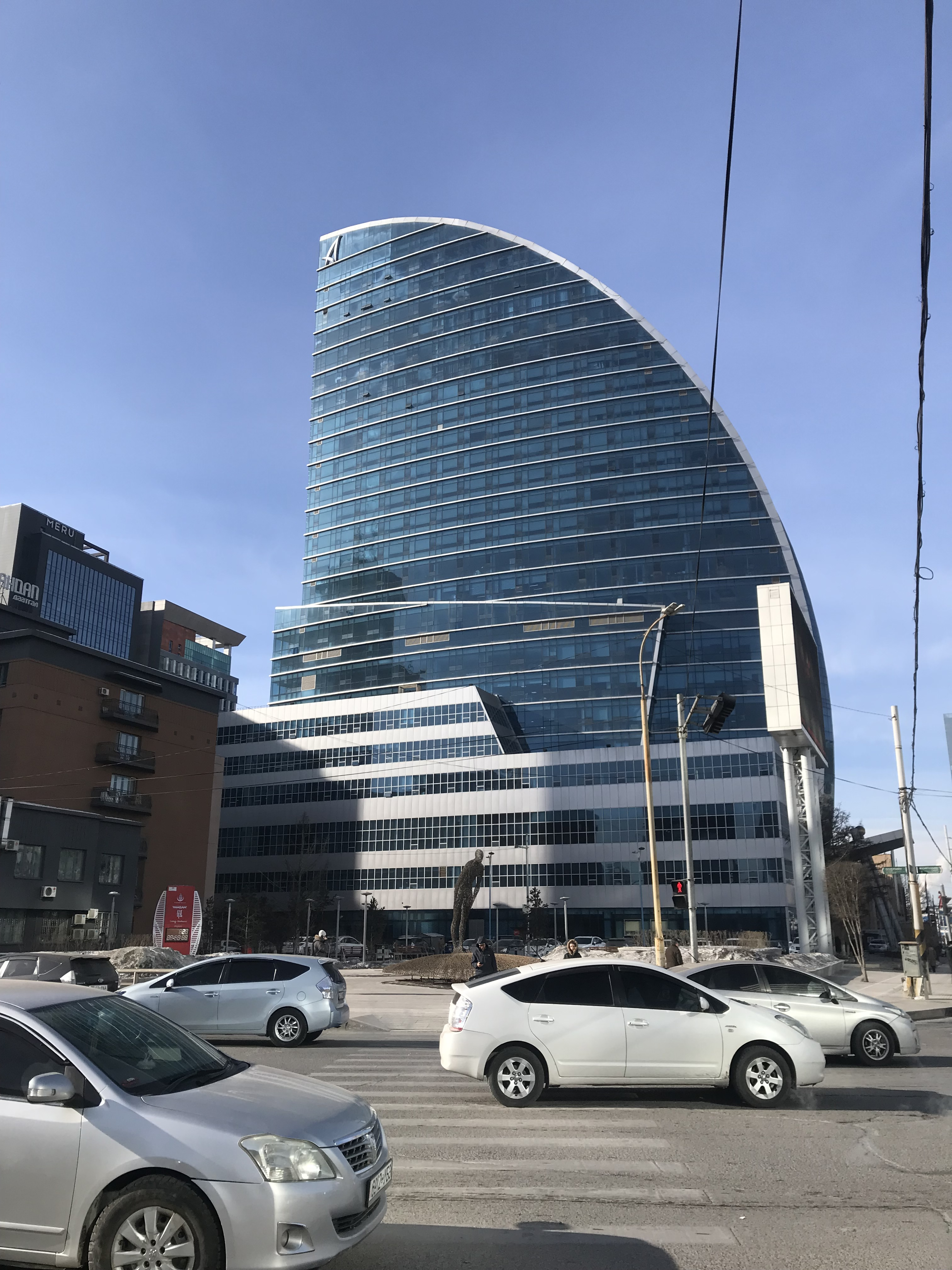
Blue Sky Tower in February 2023

== See also ==
- List of tallest buildings in Mongolia
