= Unitel (Mongolia) =

Mongolian telecommunications company

Unitel Group
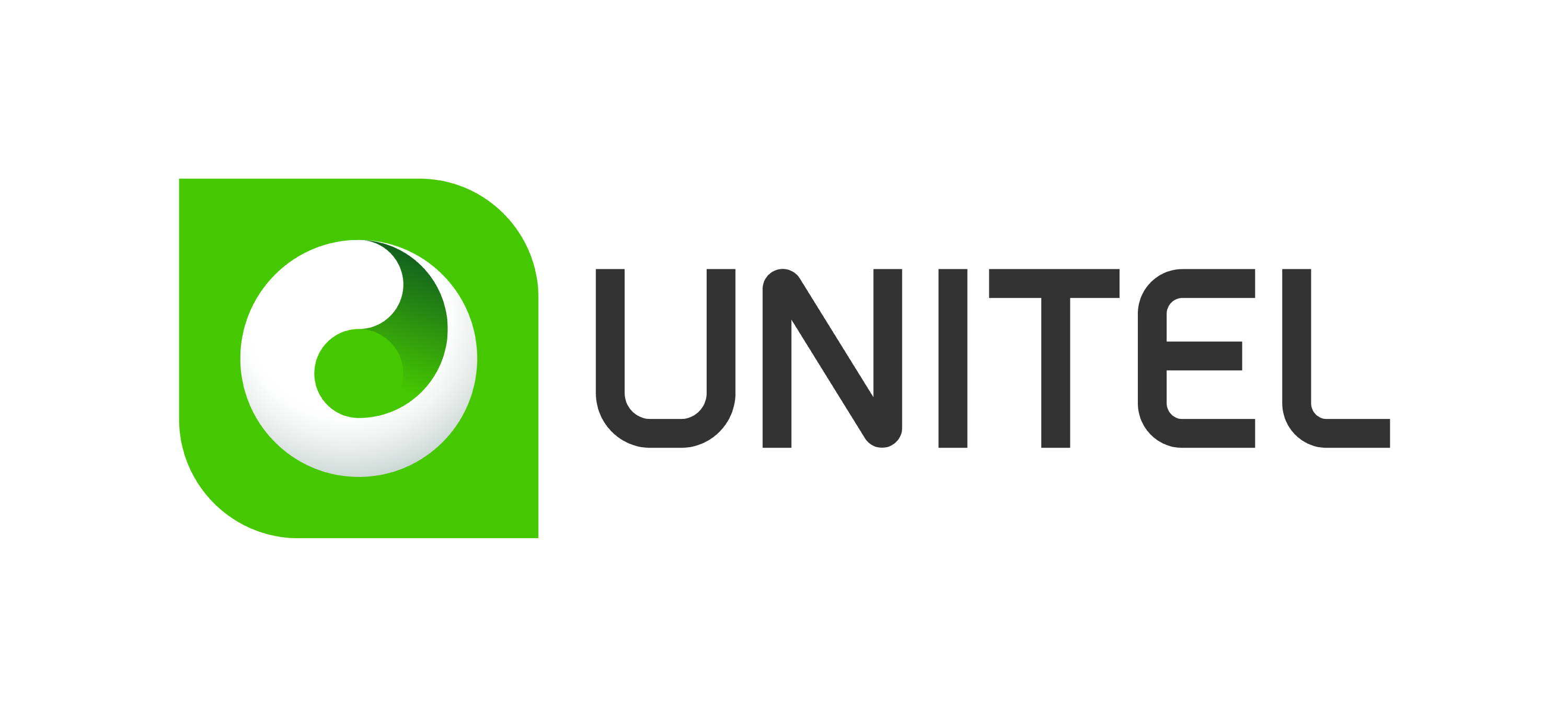

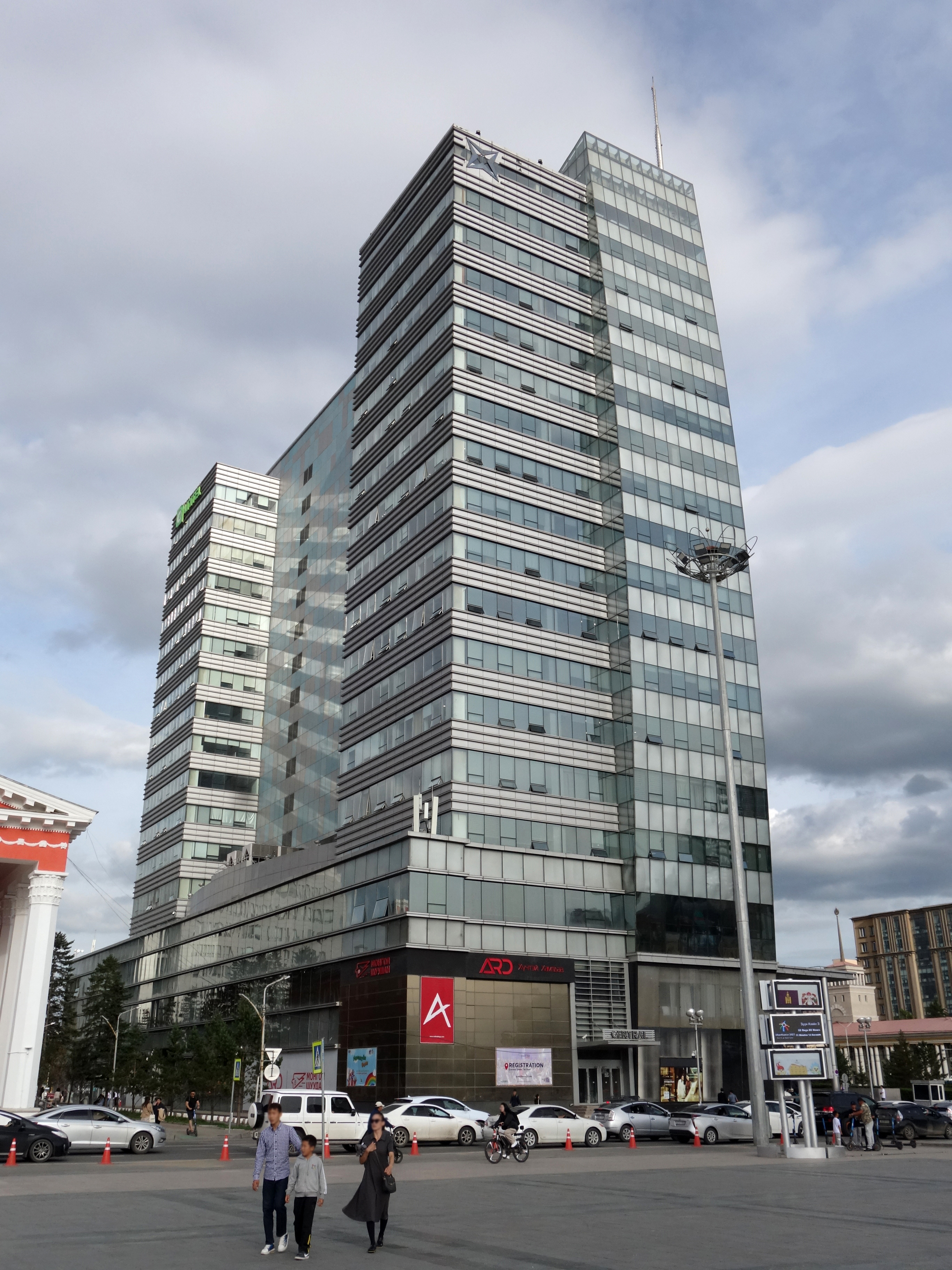
- Central Tower which houses the headquarters of Unitel
- Native name: Юнител (Mongolian)
- Type: Private
- Industry: Telecommunications
- Founded: December 23, 2005; 20 years ago
- Headquarters: Central Tower; Ulaanbaatar, Mongolia
- Area served: Mongolia
- Key people: Jamiyansharav Dorjdagva; (CEO)
- Products: Mobile phone Broadband Internet access Fixed line telephone IPTV; Streaming service
- Number of employees: 1000 (2014)
- Website: http://www.unitel.mn

Unitel (Universal or United telecommunications) is a Mongolian Corporate Group of information technology companies, headquartered at Central Tower in downtown Ulan Bator, Mongolia. It was founded on December 23, 2005 as BSB consortium as GSM mobile phone operator and began operations on June 26, 2006. As a provider of mobile telephone services, Unitel is the second largest company in terms of subscriber base and 14th largest company in Mongolia as measured by a composite of revenues, profits, assets and taxes. Its revenue, profits and revenue per subscriber figures are rapidly growing. Unitel also provides broadband subscription television services through Univision.

Within its initial launch year, Unitel acquired 200 thousand subscribers, the biggest acquisition in one year in Mongolian telecommunication history. In 2009, Unitel launched its 3G network using High Speed Packet Access (HSDPA) at 2100 MHz. Unitel network covers approximately 88% of total population of Mongolia, contrary to its common competitor, MobiCom, which is less than 12%.

In November 2010, Unitel declared that it has become 100% indigenous company (i.e. Mongolian share owners bought all share from the Korean side). In 2011, Unitel renewed its logo. Logo (Fibonacci spiral) represents growth and harmony. Major shareholder of the company is MCS Holding, Mongolian largest privately held organization.

In April 2016, Unitel Group became the first company in Mongolia to introduce a 4G LTE network. On September 15, 2022, Unitel launched Mongolia’s first 5G network test station in Sükhbaatar Square, Ulaanbaatar, initiating public access to the technology.

== Members of the group ==
- UNITEL, mobile network operator
- MCS Com, broadband ISP
- MONSAT, satellite communication service provider
- SKYNETWORKS, Mongolia's biggest fiber-optic network
- Shangri-La Group, new era of fixed phone
- UNIVISION, triple-play operator IPTV, internet, fixed phone
- Premier Sports Network, dominant subscription based sports channel

== History ==
- 2001. MCSCom was established and provided broadband internet service.
- 2003. Monsat introduced satellite communication service for the first time in Mongolia.
- 2004. Skynetworks started construction of its UB’s widest fiber-optic network.
- 2005. BSB Tia company.
- 2011. Univision launched first triple-play service (IPTV, IPPhone, IPNet) of Mongolia.
- 2011. Unitel, MCSCom, Monsat, Skynetworks, Skynetcom and Univision united to establish UNITEL GROUP.
- 2014. Unitel, Mongolian №1 ICT Group

== Services ==
=== Mobile services ===
- TourSim
- International calling | IDD, Roaming
- Postpaid services
- Prepaid services
- BlackBerry
- IP phone service
- Content services
- 3.5G services
- Value added services
- 4G LTE

=== Infrastructure ===
- Fiber optic (Fiber Core)
- High speed Ethernet Bandwidth
- FTTx Ethernet
- Designated (Exclusive) Network
- High security VPN
- IX (Internet Exchange)
- Wireless network
- 3.5G network
- LTE

=== Corporate ICT solution ===
- Network establishment (satellite, fiber optic, radio)
- Internet
- Ethernet and VPN
- Mobile, satellite and fixed phone
- M2M
- LBS
- Mobile Marketing

=== Satellite communication services ===
- Voice service
- Data communication service
- Fax services from Iridium, BGAN, Inmarsat, Globalstar, Thuraya.

=== Triple play ===
- IPTV
- Internet
- IP Phone

=== Cloud computing ===
In 2011 Unitel launched the GreenBerry mobile mail service, which is Mongolia's first clouding service under an exclusive agreement with SEVEN Networks, US company.

=== LookTV ===
In 2016, Unitel launched its video streaming service, LookTV, where its subscribers can access video-on-demand contents much like Netflix. Monthly subscription fee is different depending on the packages, Asian Pack, Hollywood Pack, Mongolian Pack and ALL Pack which includes all the contents previous packs offer.

=== U brand ===
TBA

== Distribution ==
- Network coverage in 464 regions
- 42 service centers, about 10000 sales points and mobile dealers
