= Sükhbaatar's Mausoleum =

Former mausoleum in Sükhbaatar, Ulaanbaatar, Mongolia

Coordinates: 47°55′11″N 106°55′02″E

- Сүхбаатарын бунхан Sükhbaataryn bunkhan
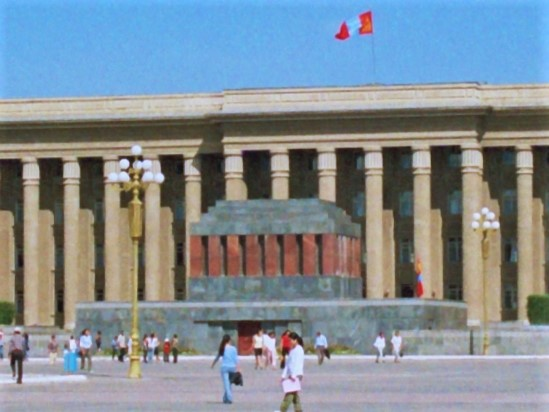
- Sükhbaatar's Mausoleum, 2005
- Interactive map of Sükhbaatar's Mausoleum
- Location: Ulaanbaatar, Mongolia
- Designer: Budjavyn Chimed
- Type: Memorial
- Material: Concrete and marble
- Beginning date: May 9, 1952
- Opening date: July 8, 1954
- Dedicated to: Damdin Sükhbaatar; Khorloogiin Choibalsan
- Dismantled date: 2005

Sükhbaatar's Mausoleum (Mongolian: Сүхбаатарын бунхан, romanized: Sükhbaataryn bunkhan), sometimes referred to as Sükhbaatar's and Choibalsan's Mausoleum, was a mausoleum located at Sükhbaatar Square in Ulaanbaatar, Mongolia. The mausoleum served as the resting place of Damdin Sükhbaatar, leader and commander of the Mongolian Revolution of 1921, and Khorloogiin Choibalsan, leader and marshal of the Mongolian People's Republic from 1939 to his death in 1952. The building was erected on the north side of Sükhbaatar Square in front of the Government Palace after Choibalsan's death during the socialist era. It was removed in 2005 to make place for a structure dedicated to Chinggis Khan. The mausoleum resembled the shape of Lenin's Mausoleum but differed in color. The mausoleum was never opened for public visits.

== History ==
=== Construction and development ===
Damdin Sükhbaatar had been buried at the Altan-Ölgii National Cemetery in 1923, but was exhumed and reinterred in the mausoleum the following year. In the 1930s, it was rebuilt, turning into an almost exact copy of Lenin's Mausoleum. On May 9, 1952, after the funeral of Marshal Khorloogiin Choibalsan, a resolution of the Politburo of the Central Committee of the Mongolian People's Revolutionary Party was issued, according to which the sketch of a new mausoleum of Choibalsan and Sükhbaatar by architect Budjavyn Chimed was approved. According to this sketch, the tribune on the mausoleum was 14.3 meters long and 13.87 centimeters wide. Inside the mausoleum, the walls were decorated with small stones, and the outside was decorated with white marble. Specialists from the USSR were invited to build the mausoleum, and marble was brought from the valley of the Orkhon River in the city of Kharkhorin. The Chief of the General Staff of the People's Army, Colonel General Zhamyangiyn Lkhagvasuren was responsible for the renovation works at the mausoleum, with soldiers of the Construction and Engineering Forces of the Mongolian People's Army taking part in the construction effort. On July 8, 1954, the grand opening of the mausoleum took place, with this day being declared a holiday. Cadets of military universities marched in front of the newly renovated mausoleum during its opening.

=== 1954–2005 ===
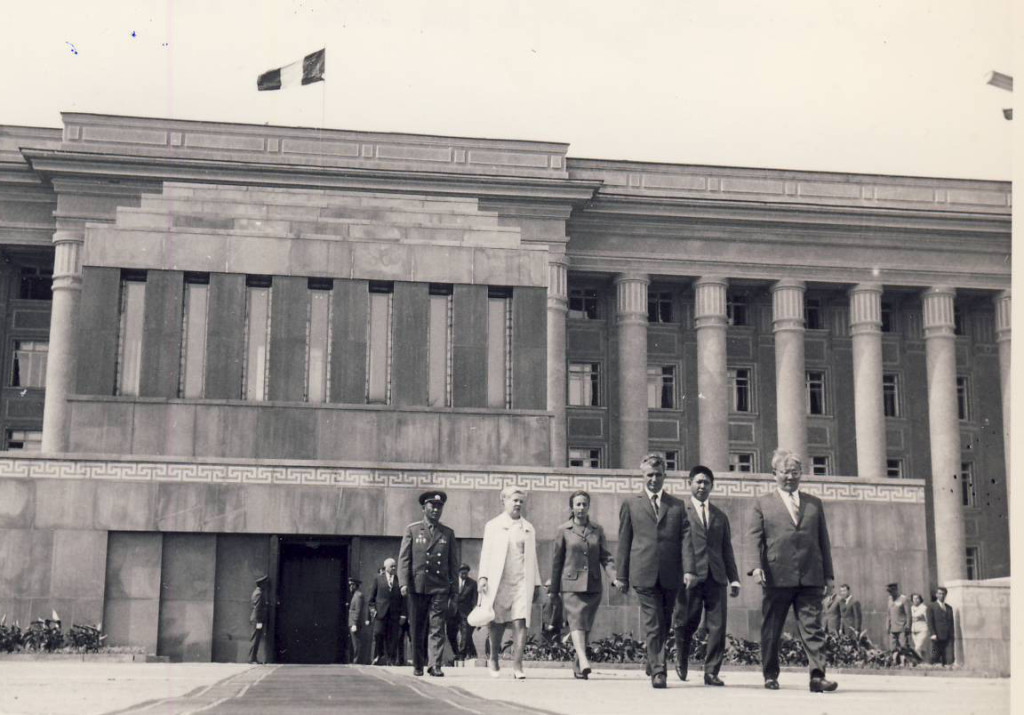
Nicolae Ceaușescu with Yumjaagiin Tsedenbal near the mausoleum during a state visit in 1973.

Since 1954, during the parades on International Workers' Day, the Day of the People's Revolution of 1921 , and October Revolution Day, the leadership of the country came to the podium of the mausoleum and greeted the people. For this, a resolution of the Central Committee of the MPRP was issued on April 2, 1955, keeping this tradition until the 1990s. Notable persons have also visited the mausoleum during its existence, including Leonid Brezhnev, Mikhail Suslov, Nicolae Ceaușescu and Wojciech Jaruzelski. Security at the mausoleum from 1951 to 1956 was provided by 10 soldiers allocated by the special security company, who guarded the structure. Beginning in 1956, security and cleaning at the structure were the responsibility of the commandant's office of the State Residence. In 1971 and the 1980s, repair work was carried out, with Soviet specialists who worked in the Lenin Mausoleum as well as specialists from Ulan-Ude being invited to serve as overseers.

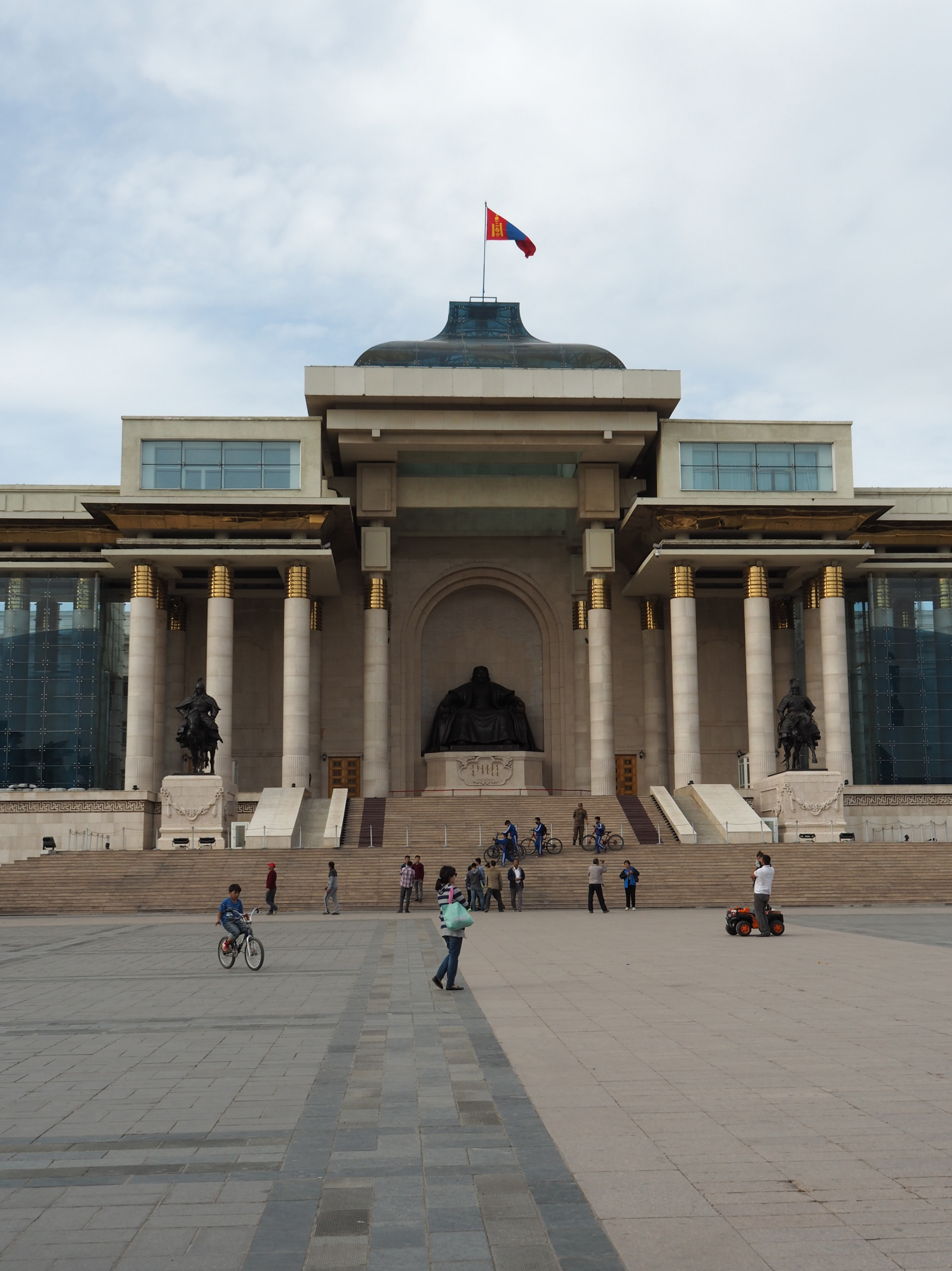
A memorial structure dedicated to Chinggis Khan and the Mongol Empire sits in its place.

=== Destruction and exhumation ===
The mausoleum stood until 2005, at which point it was demolished in order to make room for the construction of an extension to the State Residence and a monument to Chinggis Khan. By that time, more than 20 political parties had come out in favor of the reburial of the country's former leaders. The corpses of both rulers were again exhumed, cremated according to Buddhist rites, and the ashes entombed at Altan-Ölgii cemetery in 2005, under the supervision of the Buddhist clergy.

== See also ==
- Lenin's Mausoleum
- Georgi Dimitrov Mausoleum, Bulgarian mausoleum which met a similar fate.
- National Monument at Vítkov
- Agostinho Neto's Mausoleum
