= Premier Sports Network =

Mongolian television channel

- Country: Mongolia
- Headquarters: Ulaanbaatar

Programming
- Language: Mongolian
- Picture format: 16:9 (SDTV)

Ownership
- Owner: Unitel

History
- Launched: November 1, 2022
- Former names: SPS, Unisports

Links
- Website: www.psn.mn

Premier Sports Network (PSN) is a Mongolian sports pay television channel and media platform that broadcasts a wide range of domestic and international sporting events.

PSN holds broadcasting rights to several major international sports properties, including the English Premier League, UEFA Champions League, and the National Basketball Association.

== Broadcasting rights ==
Football

- UEFA Champions League
- UEFA Europa League
- UEFA Europa Conference League
- UEFA Nations League
- UEFA Super Cup
- UEFA European Qualifiers
- Premier League
- FA Cup
- FA Community Shield
- Bundesliga
- Serie A
- EURO 2024
- FIFA World Cup

Basketball

- NBA
- FIBA
- The League (aka Mongolian Basketball League)
- MCBA

MMA

- UFC
- One Championship

Wrestling

- Pepsi Altan Tsom

Summer Olympic Games

- Paris 2024 Summer Olympics

Alongside its live sports broadcasts, PSN also airs a variety of sports highlight, talk, and documentary-styled shows. These include:

- NBA Talk
- Football Talk
- Hoop Notes
