= Mongolian Theatre Museum =

Museum in Sükhbaatar, Ulaanbaatar, Mongolia

- Монголын Театрын Музей
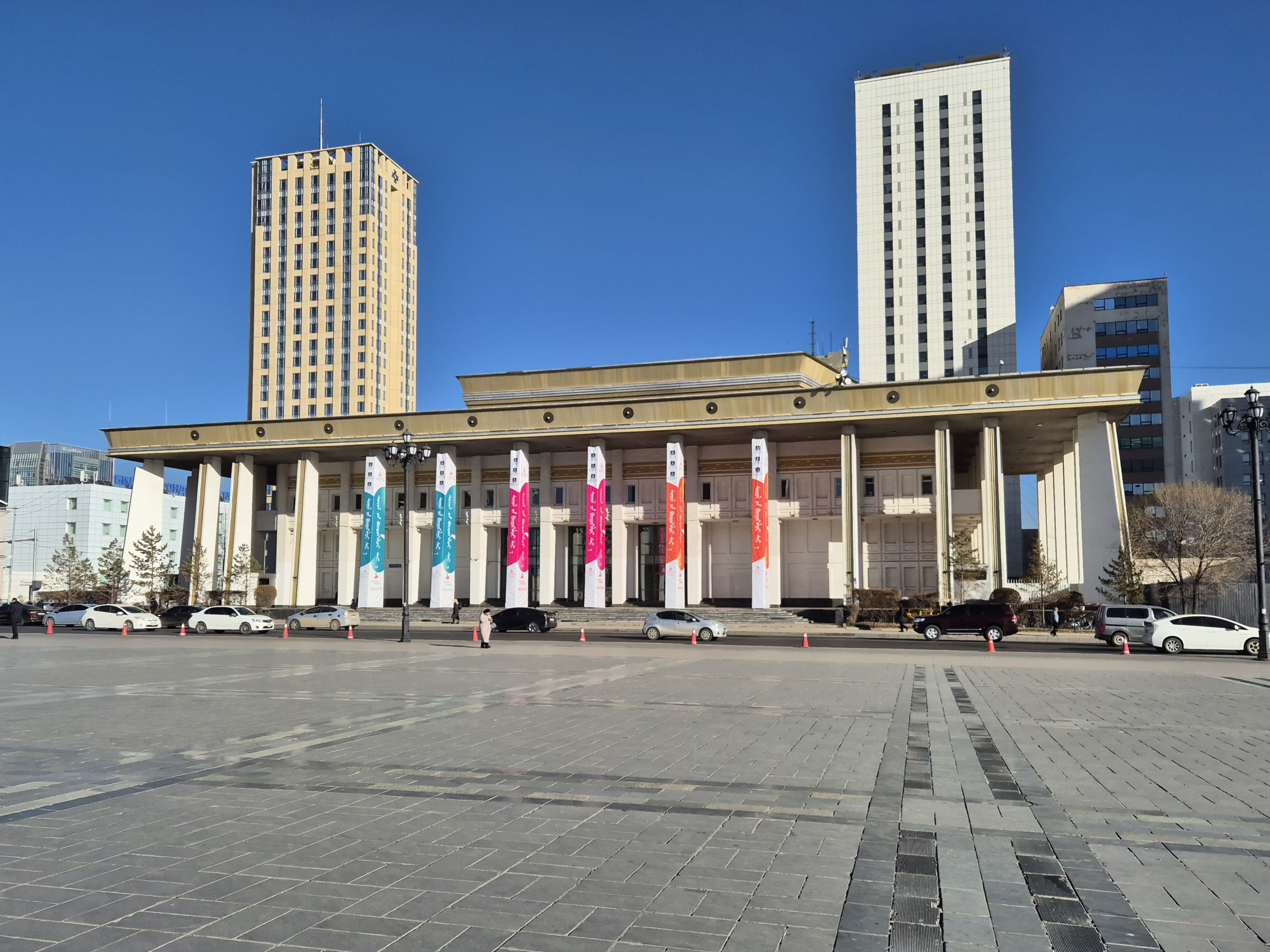
- Established: 1991
- Location: Sükhbaatar, Ulaanbaatar, Mongolia
- Coordinates: 47°55′10″N 106°55′11″E
- Type: museum
- Website: Official website

Mongolian Theatre Museum (Mongolian: Монголын Театрын Музей) was founded in 1991 to preserve and present the traditions and artifacts of the performing arts in Mongolia and to do research in this area. The museum is located in the Central Cultural Palace Building, on Amar Street, just off Sükhbaatar Square in Sükhbaatar District, Ulaanbaatar.

On display are paintings of leading actors, playbills, photographs, models, costumes etc. from the state central theatre. Included are artifacts and photographs pertaining to dance, circus, opera, music and puppet theatre as well as traditional theatre.

In addition, camera equipment, costuming and a few props as well as stills are presented in a separate hall about Mongolian movies.

The collection has 9,000 objects.

The museum has programs that include publishing, interviews with leading performers and education program for children.

The museum is run under the auspices of the Ministry of Education and Science. It is open week-days ten to five and on week-ends by appointment.

== See also ==
- List of music museums

== Publications ==
- театр бидний Гзр, 2005
