= Government Palace (Mongolia) =

Headquarters of the government of Mongolia

- Төрийн ордон ᠲᠥᠷᠦ ᠶ᠋ᠢᠨ ᠣᠷᠳᠣᠨ
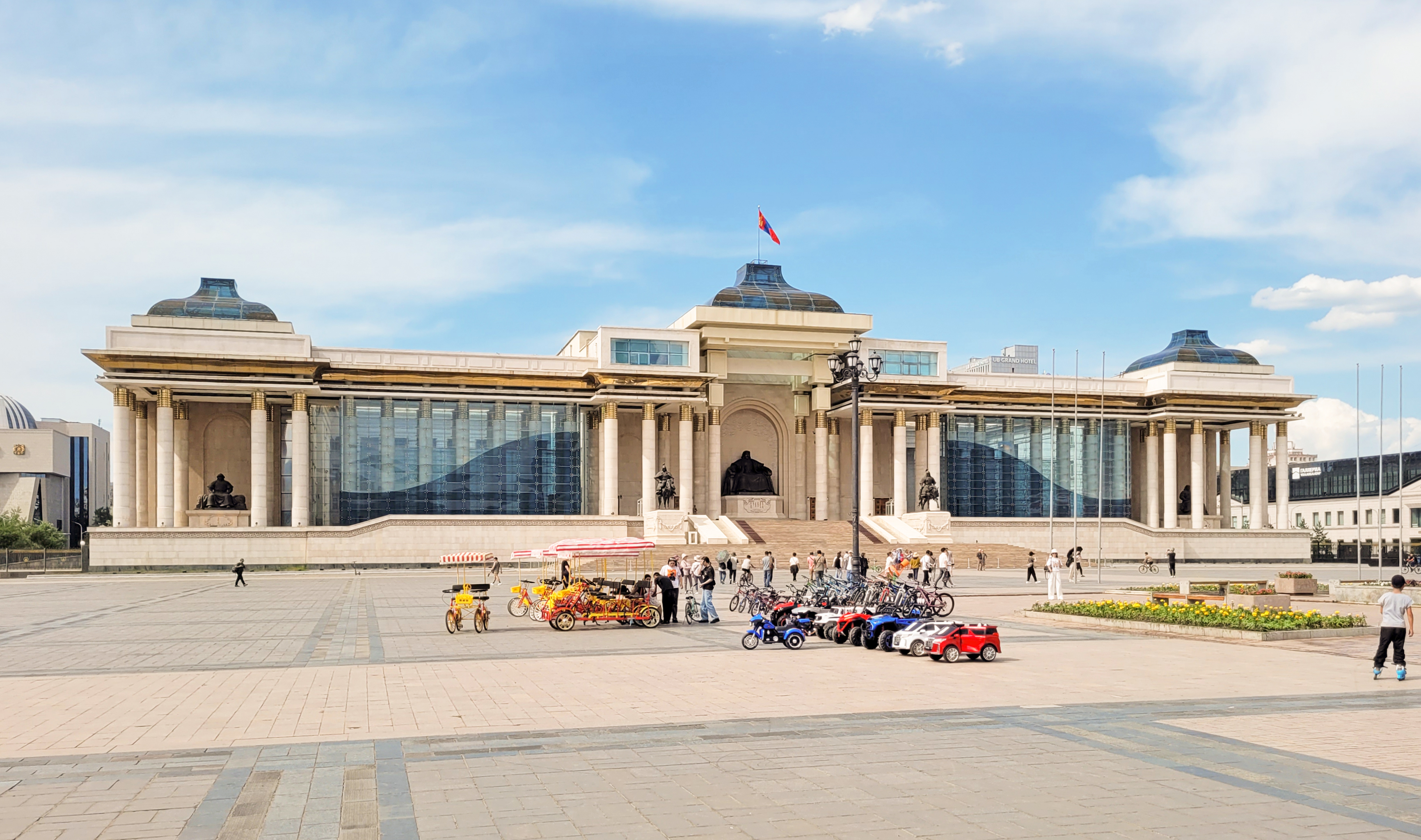
- Government Palace in 2023

General information
- Architectural style: Neoclassical
- Location: Ulaanbaatar, Mongolia
- Coordinates: 47°55′15″N 106°55′02″E
- Current tenants: Government of Mongolia; State Great Khural
- Construction started: April 1947
- Completed: 1951; 75 years ago
- Renovated: 1958–1961, 1979–1981, 2005–2006

Height
- Height: 18.7 m (61 ft)

Technical details
- Floor count: 4
- Floor area: 37,212 m^{2} (400,550 sq ft)

Design and construction
- Architect: Budjavyn Chimed

The Government Palace (Mongolian: Төрийн ордон, romanized: Töriin ordon), also known as the State Palace, is located on the north side of Sükhbaatar Square in Ulaanbaatar, the capital of Mongolia. Completed in 1951, it houses various state organs such as the State Great Khural (unicameral parliament) and offices of its members, as well as the offices of the President and Prime Minister. It is sometimes referred to by Ulaanbaatar residents as the Saaral Ordon ('Gray Palace') due to the exterior's former color, which was eventually painted white in 2007.

== History ==
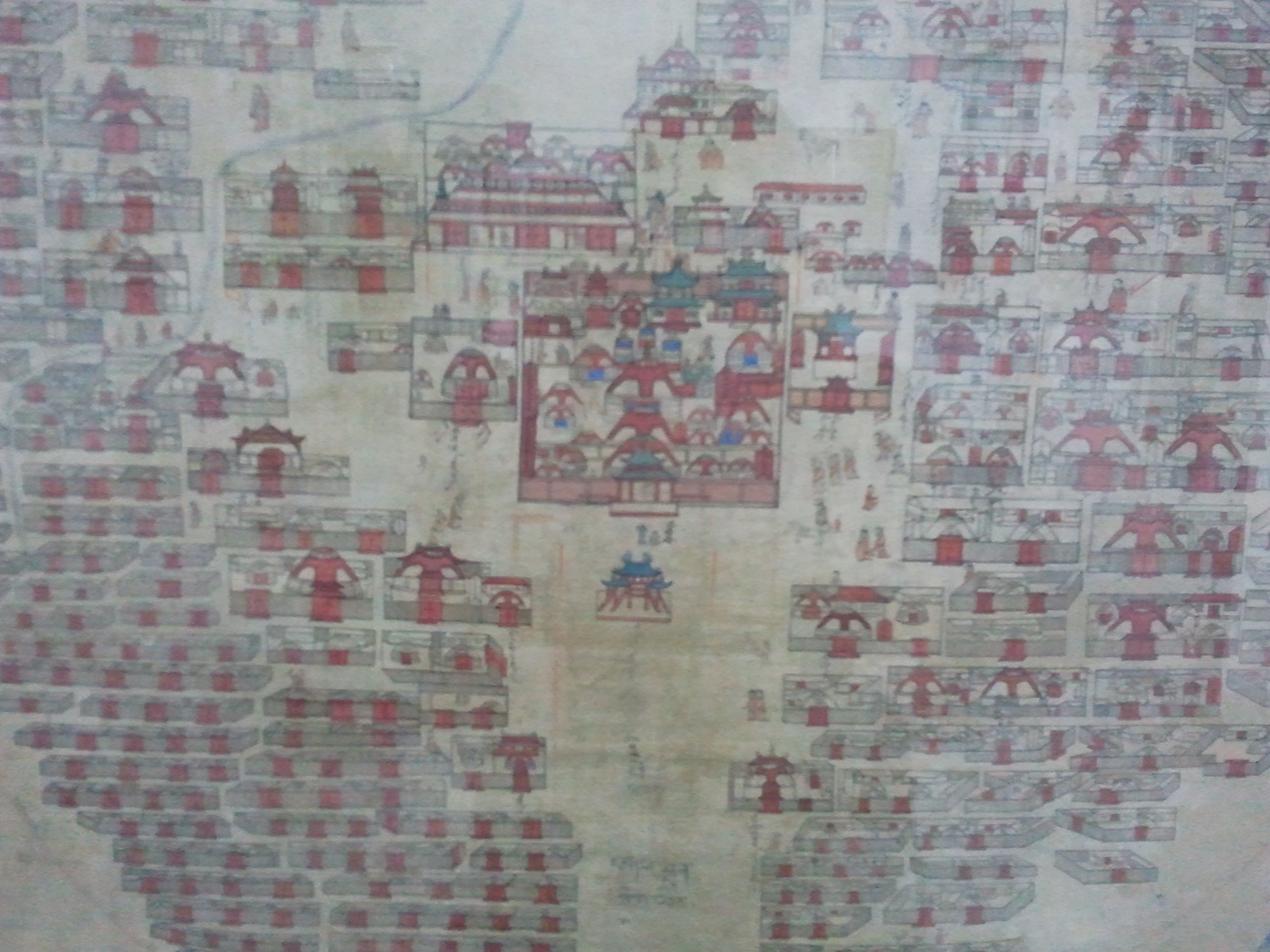
19th-century painting of Ikh Khüree

The grounds of the present day Government Palace and Sükhbaatar Square were largely occupied by the monastery of Ikh Khüree, the central temple-palace complex of the city up until the early part of the 20th century. The monastery was established in 1639 and was a moveable site that changed location nearly thirty times before finally settling in present-day Ulaanbaatar in 1855. It was famous for its high-level monastic education, ten monastic schools, numerous temples, 15 000 lamas, thirty lama districts, spectacular religious festivals, and wealthy treasuries. Originally called Züün Khüree (East Monastery), the complex was the largest and oldest section of what was to become Ulaanbaatar. The monastery had a large open area (later the main city square) which was surrounded on all sides by temples, residences of the nobility and clergy as well as the Baruun Damnuurchin market. Here, Mongolian wrestling and Tsam dances took place in the presence of nobles and clergy. Later, the area became a dumping ground for refuse that the Bogd Khan would pass on his royal procession to the Yellow Palace.

Following the Mongolian Revolution of 1921, the garbage was cleared and a Green Domed Theater was built on the site in 1926. The adjoining Ikh Khüree Monastery was completely destroyed by the country's communist regime in the 1930s as part of large scale persecutions of the Buddhist Church. Today only a couple of old temples recall the beauty of the old city. The Green Domed Theater burned down in 1949. In 1946, construction of Sükhbaatar Square began with a statue of the revolutionary leader Damdiny Sükhbaatar. Mongolia's supreme leader Marshal Choibalsan participated as a simple worker digging out the marker on the spot chosen for Sukhbaatar's statue.

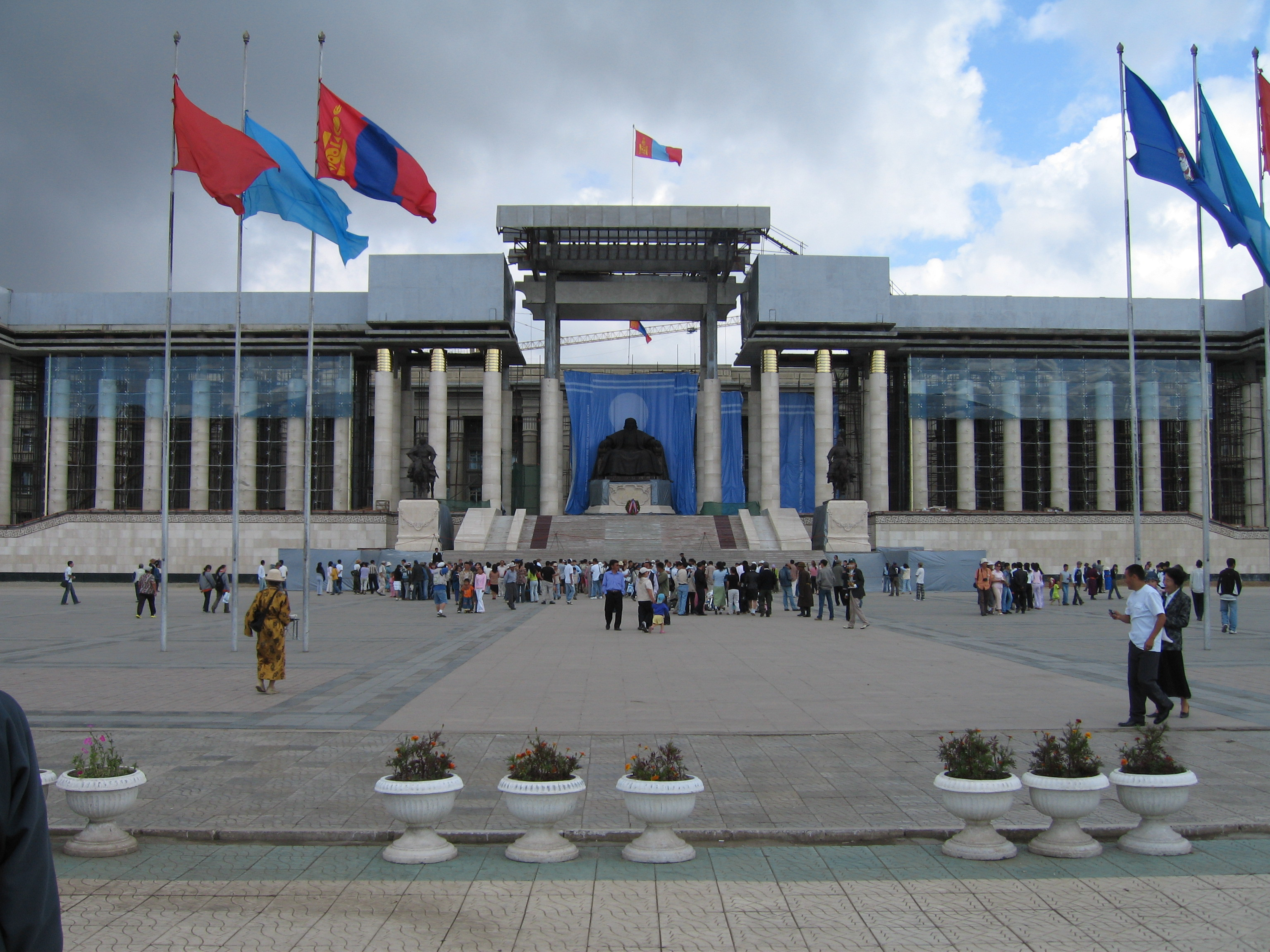
The Government Palace during the 2005 renovations.

After the destruction of the Green Domed Theater, Choibalsan ordered the construction of the Government Palace on its site in 1951. After Choibalsan's death in 1952 party leaders had a mausoleum similar to Vladimir Lenin's in Moscow built at the Palace's south face to hold the remains of Sükhbaatar and Choibalsan. Completed in 1954, Sükhbaatar's Mausoleum served as the viewing platform for party leaders and high ranking government officials during national day and May 1 parades every year until the Democratic Revolution of 1990.

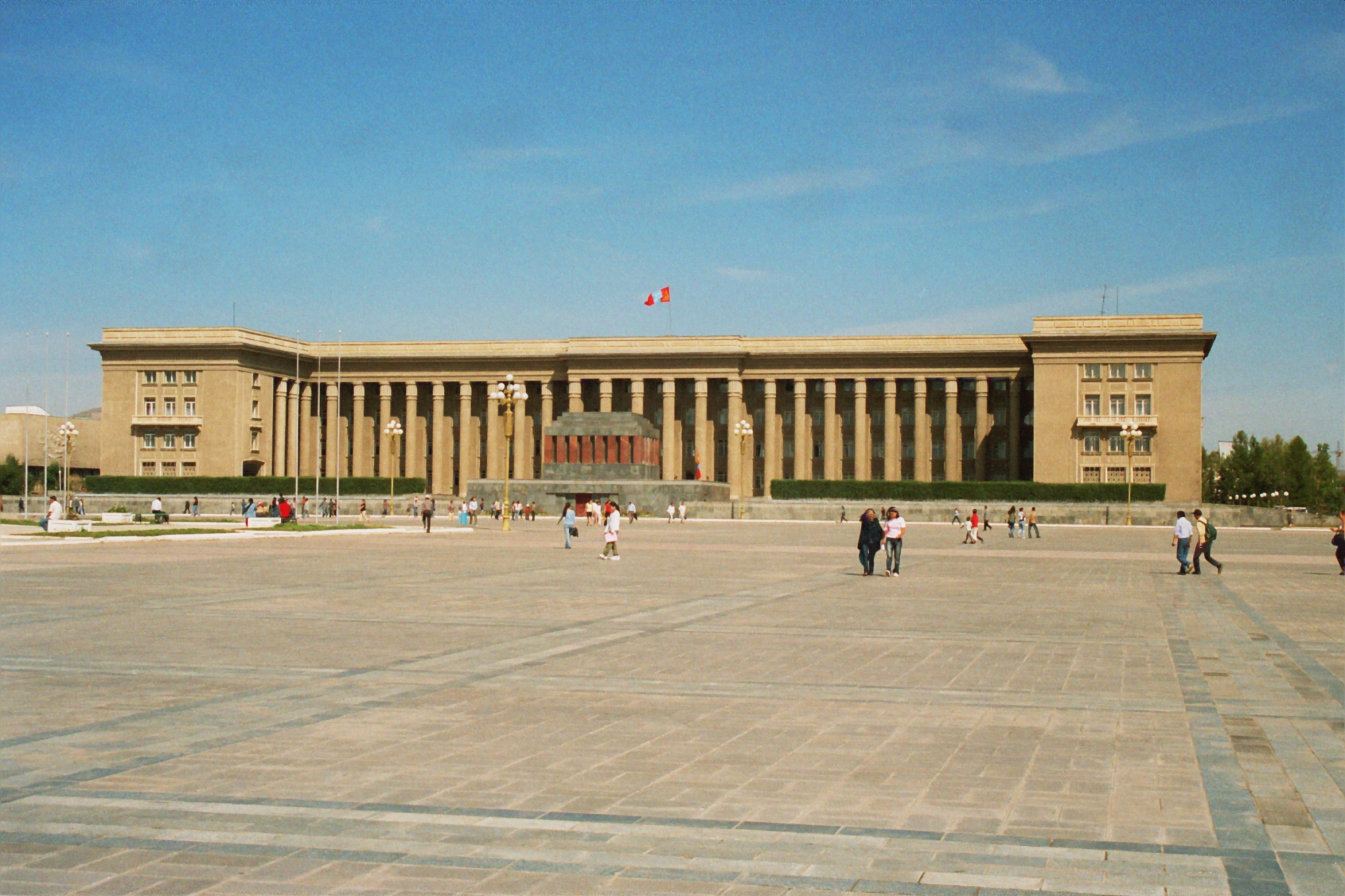
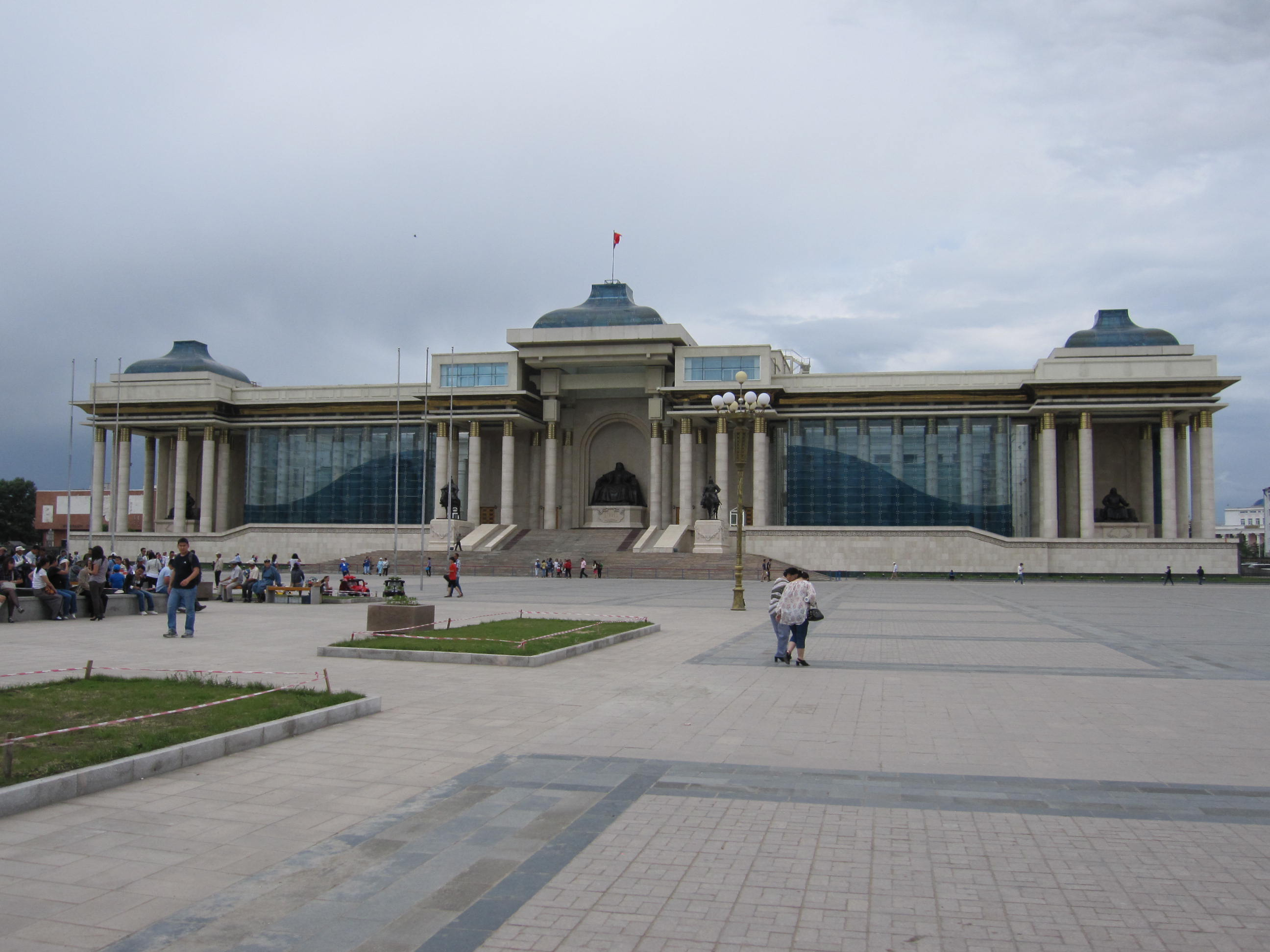
The South Side of the Government Palace facing Sükhbaatar Square before the 2005 renovation (left) and after (right)

In 2005, Sükhbaatar's Mausoleum was torn down as part of extensive renovations to the palace and replaced by a grand colonnade monument to Genghis Khan, Ögedei Khan, and Kublai Khan, completed in 2006 in time for the 800-year anniversary of Genghis Khan's coronation. The statue of Genghis Khan is guarded with two of his generals Muqali and Bo'orchu.

== Gallery ==
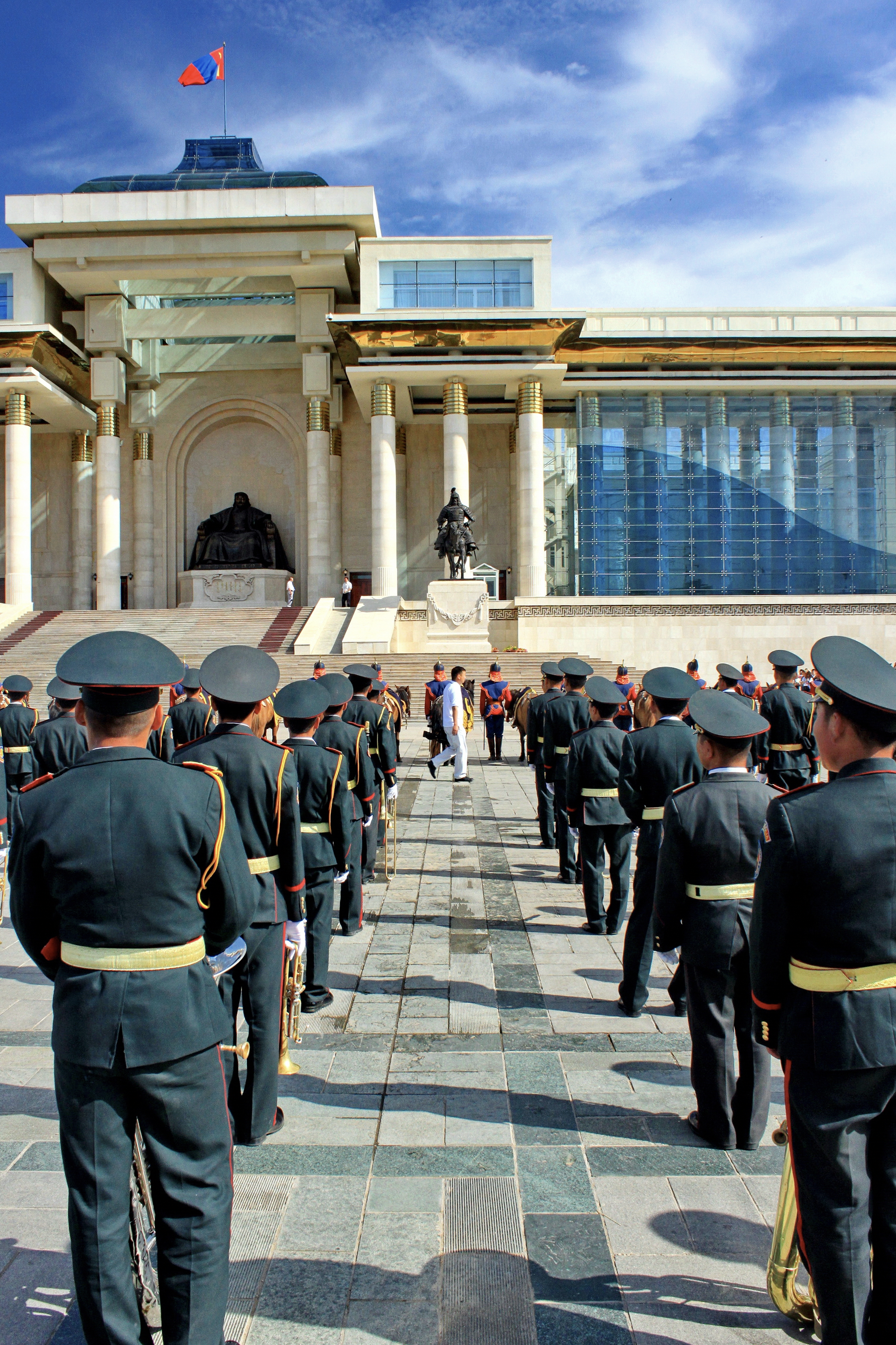
Military band in front of the Palace

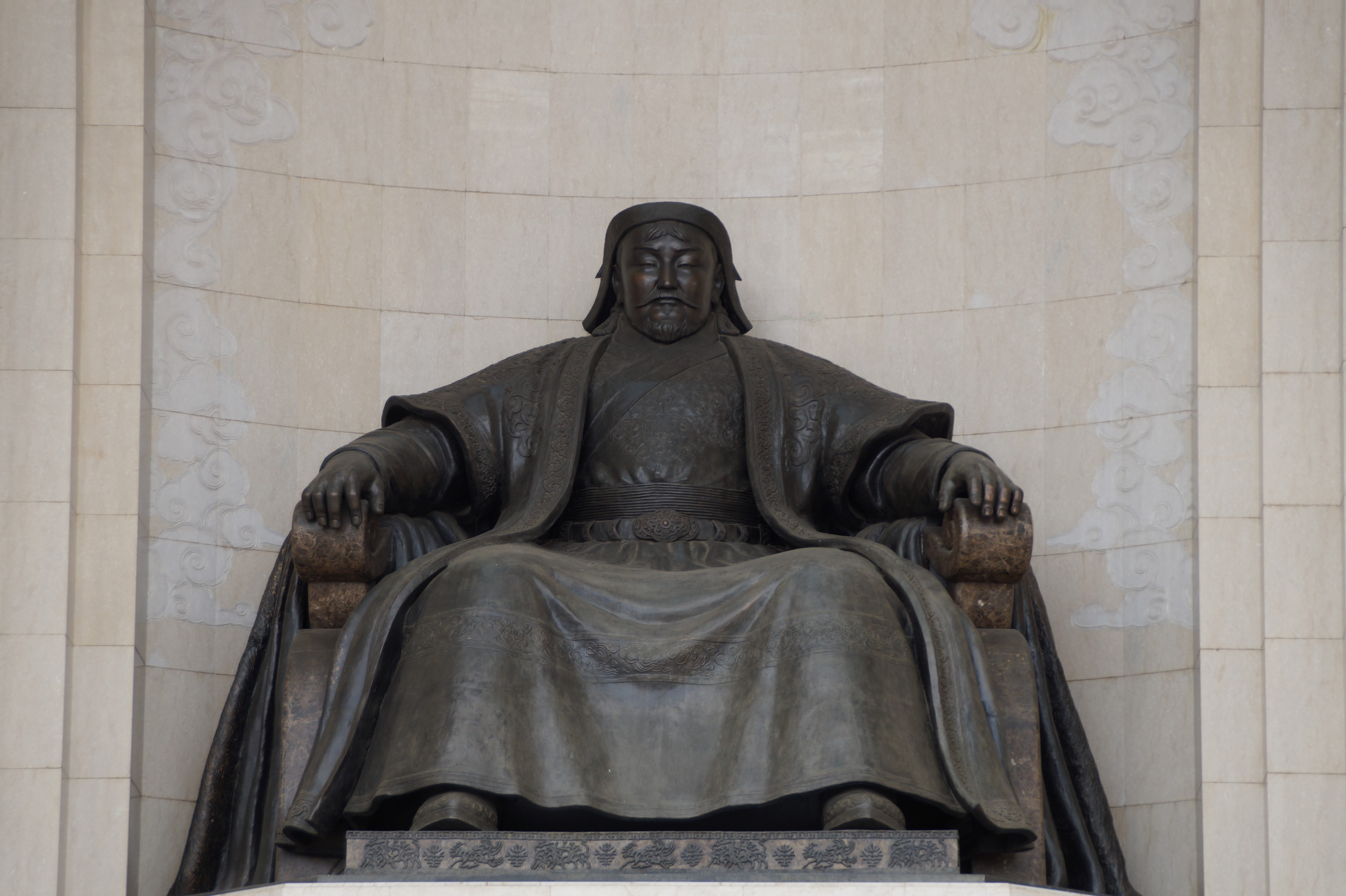
The Statue of Genghis Khan (south side)

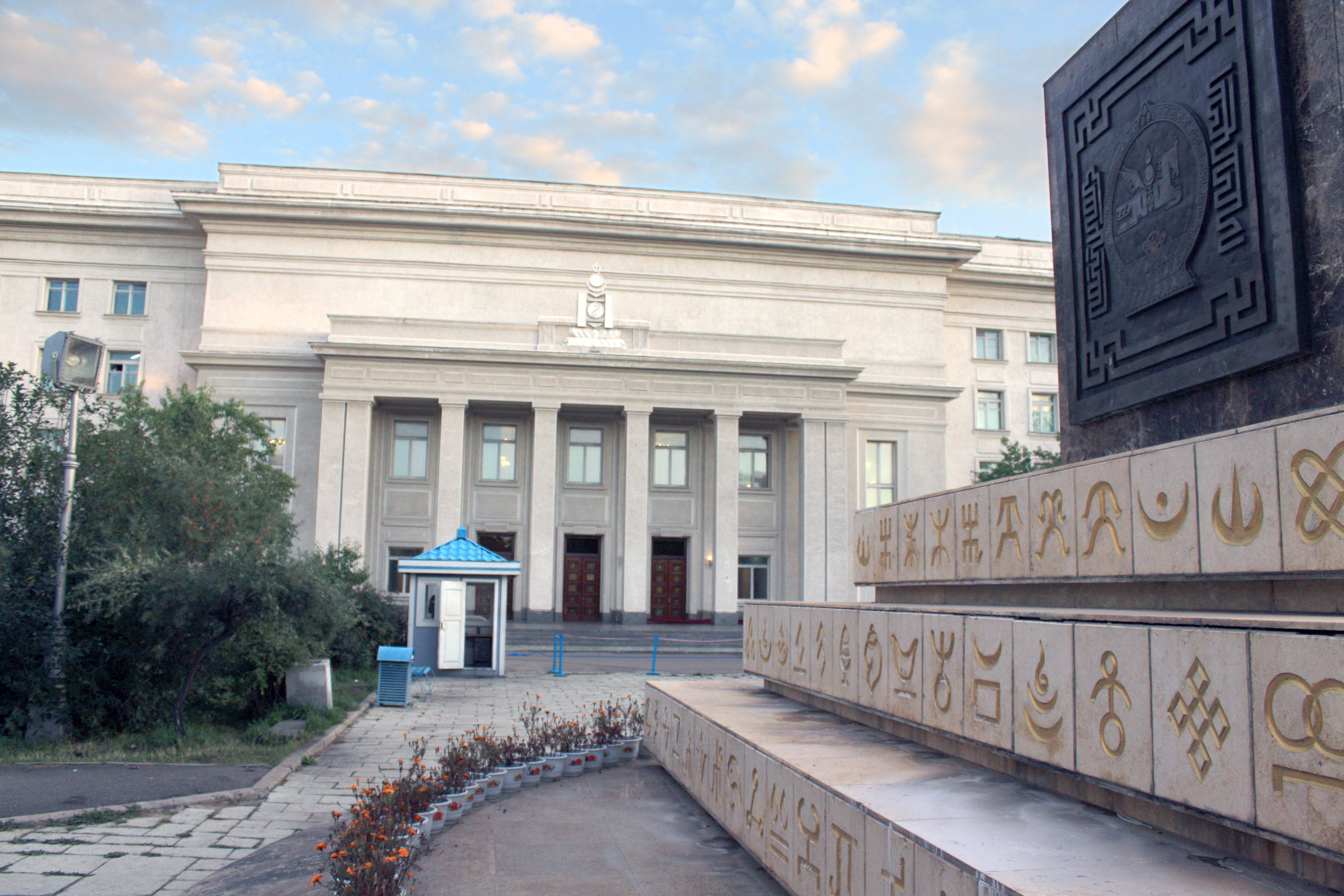
Main Entrance of the Palace (north) and Tamgha Statue

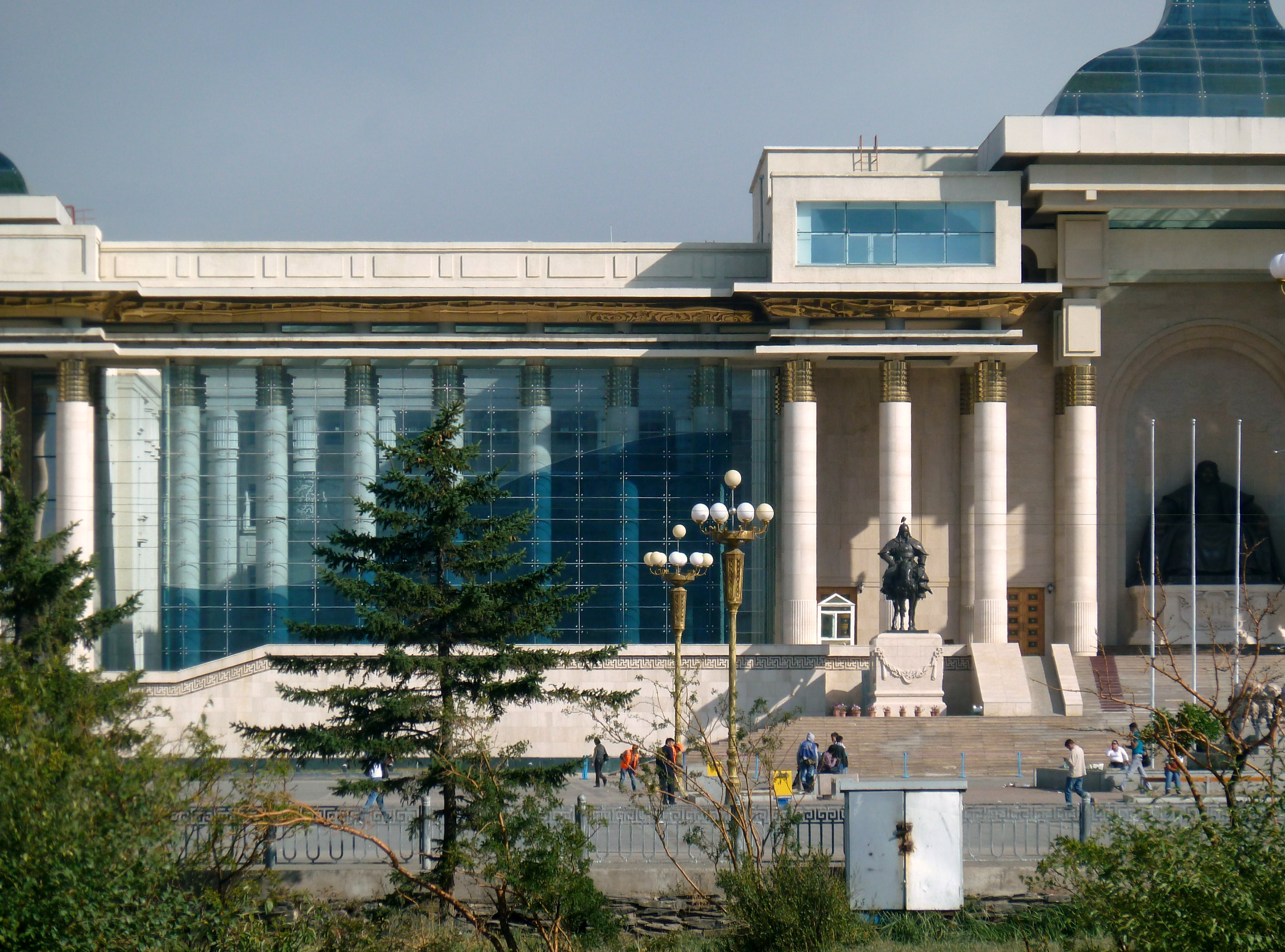
Government Palace photographed from afar

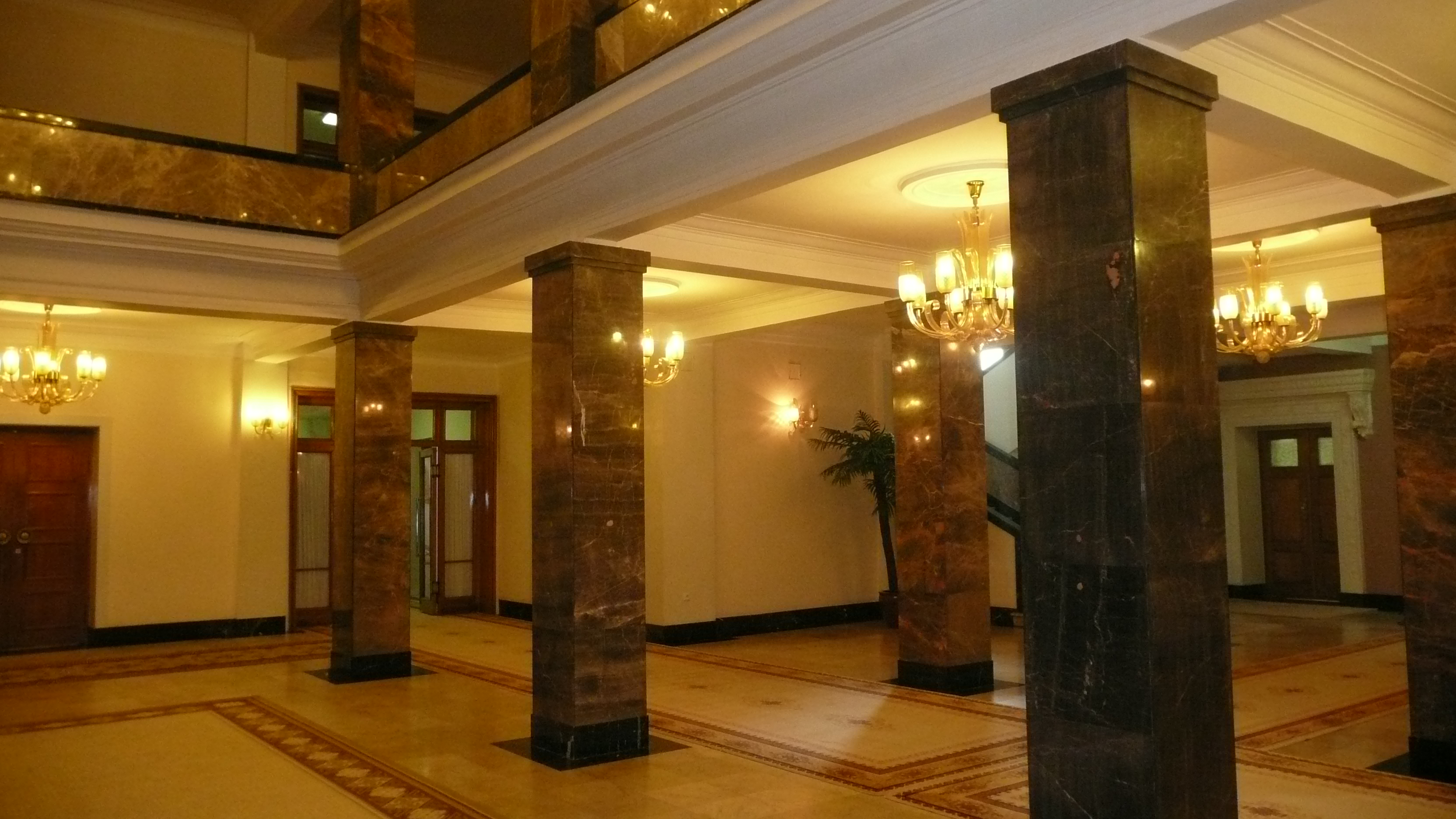
Inside the Government Palace

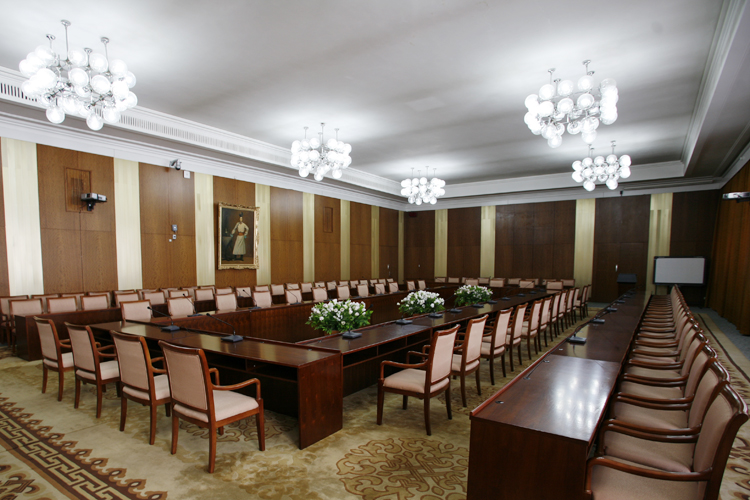
"Damdin Sükhbaatar" Meeting Hall

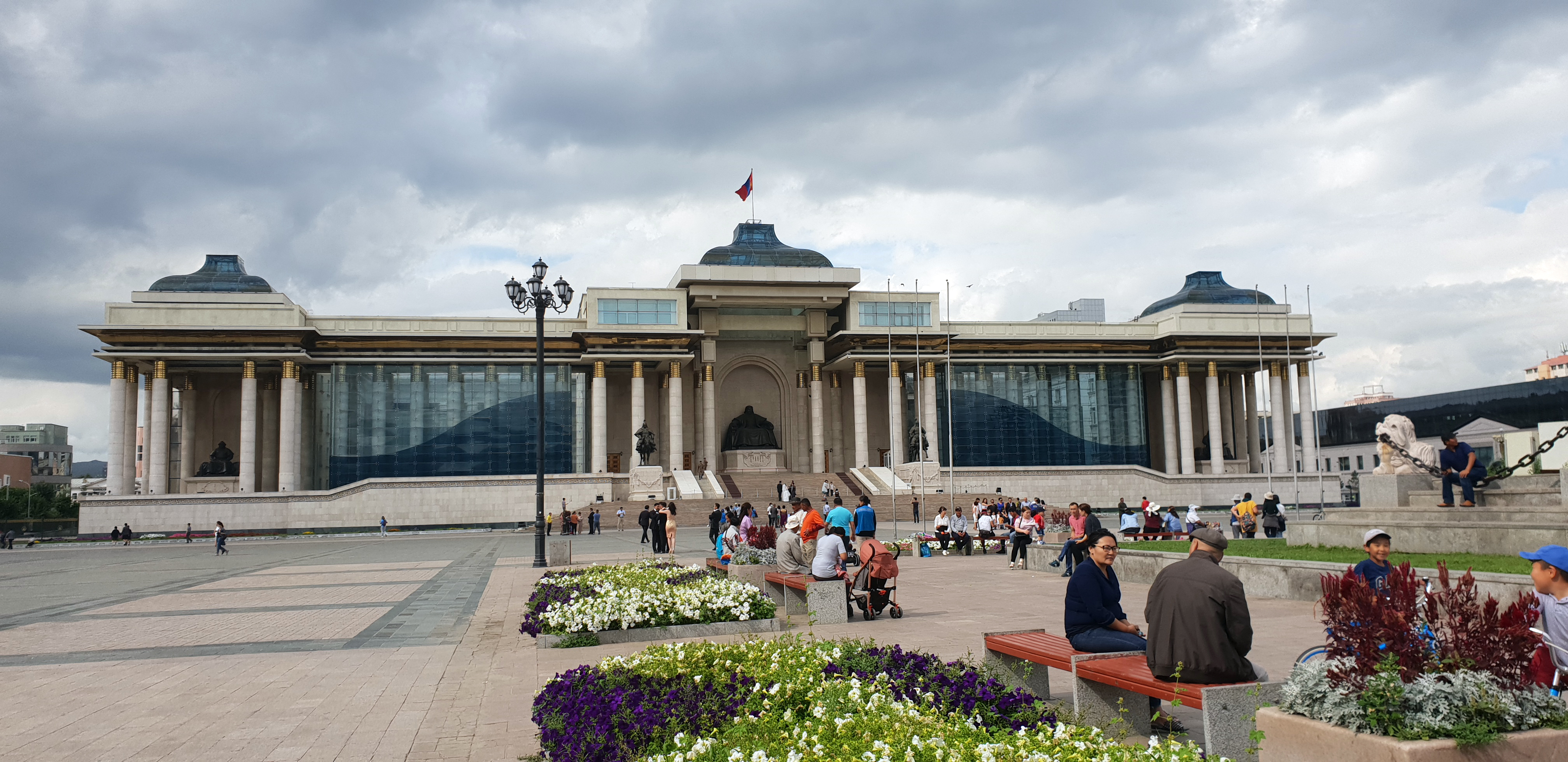
Wide shot of the Government Palace

== See also ==
- Sükhbaatar Square
- State Great Khural
- Government of Mongolia
