= Central Tower (Ulaanbaatar) =

Office skyscraper in Ulaanbaatar, Mongolia

- Сентрал Тауэр
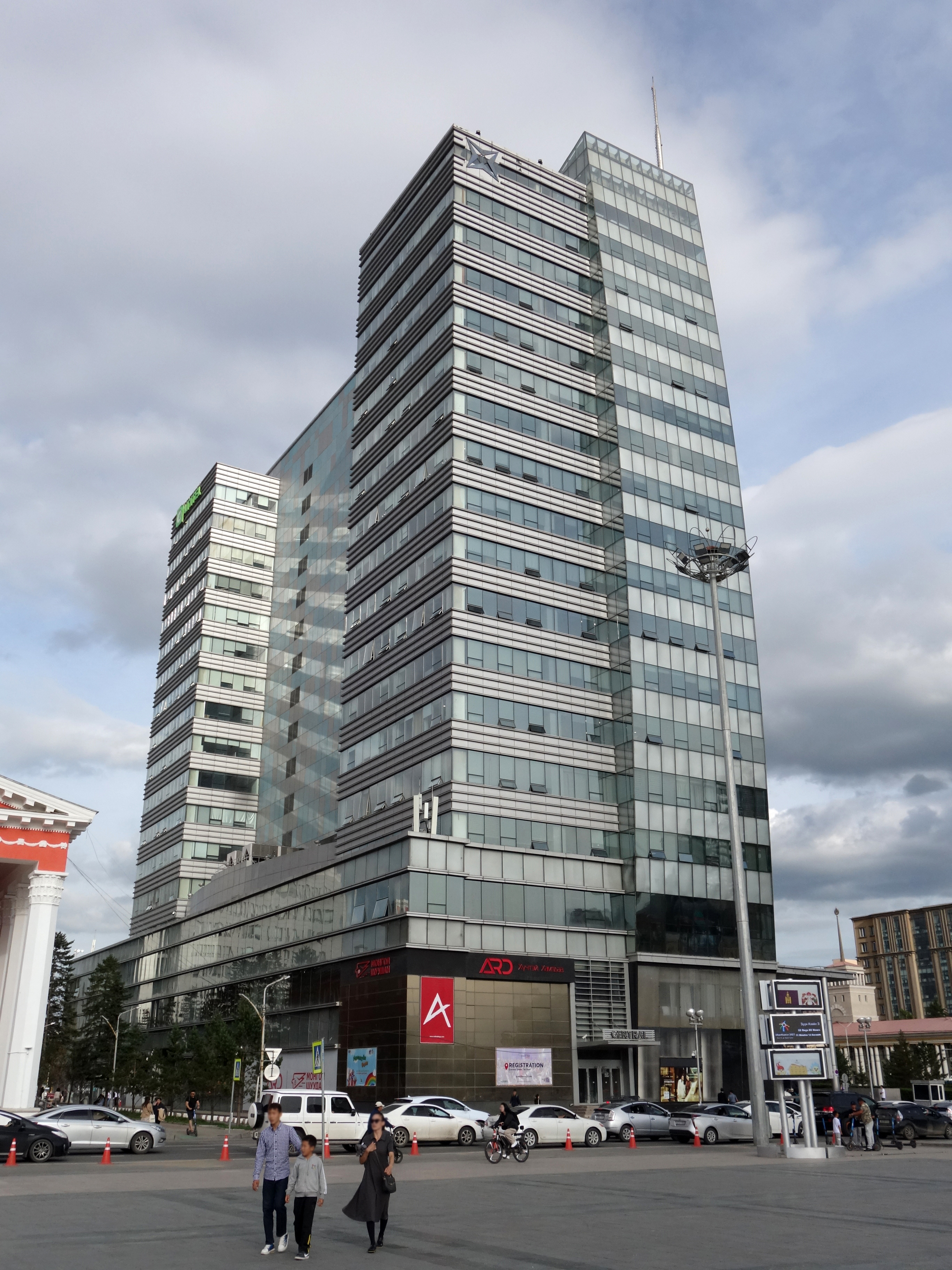
- Central Tower in July 2023
- Interactive map of the Central Tower area

General information
- Status: Completed
- Type: Office / Retail
- Location: Sükhbaatar Square, Ulaanbaatar, Mongolia
- Coordinates: 47°55′04.8″N 106°55′12.2″E
- Completed: 2009

Height
- Architectural: 107.5 m (353 ft)

Technical details
- Material: Concrete
- Floor count: 17 (+ 1 below ground)
- Floor area: 42,450 m^{2} (456,928 sq ft)
- Lifts/elevators: 7

Design and construction
- Architects: Dennis Lau & Ng Chun Man Architects & Engineers (HK) Ltd. (DLN)
- Developer: Shangri-La Ulaanbaatar Ltd.
- Main contractor: Beijing Construction Engineering Group

Website
- https://www.centraltower.mn/en/home/

The Central Tower (Mongolian: Сентрал Тауэр) is a 107.5 m (353 ft), 17-story office skyscraper located near Sükhbaatar Square in the Sükhbaatar District of Ulaanbaatar, Mongolia. The building was designed by Dennis Lau and Ng Chun Man Architects and Engineers (HK) Ltd., and developed by Shangri-La Ulaanbaatar Ltd. Completed in 2009, it became the first modern skyscraper in Mongolia. Upon its completion, it surpassed a 16-story residential complex in Darkhan, which had been built in 1985 and served as the tallest building in Mongolia until the Central Tower was finished. The skyscraper remained the tallest building in Mongolia until 2013, when it was surpassed by the Best Western Premier Tuushin Hotel.

The building is classified as a Grade A commercial office tower, reflecting high quality and service standards. It is occupied by several notable luxury goods companies, including Louis Vuitton, Zegna, Hugo Boss, Montblanc, and Ulysse Nardin. The structure also serves as the headquarters for Unitel, which is a leading technology company in the country. Originally planned to open as a Shangri-La hotel, the skyscraper was converted into an office building before its completion.

A statue of Marco Polo is located in front of the building. It was sculpted by Denzen Barsbold and completed in 2011.

== Gallery ==
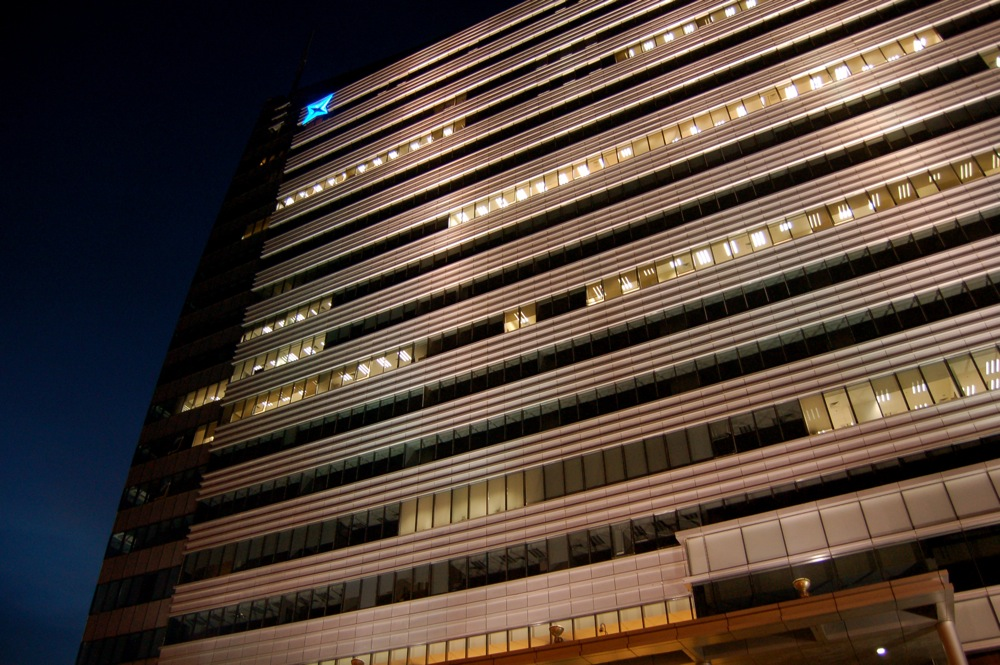
The skyscraper at night

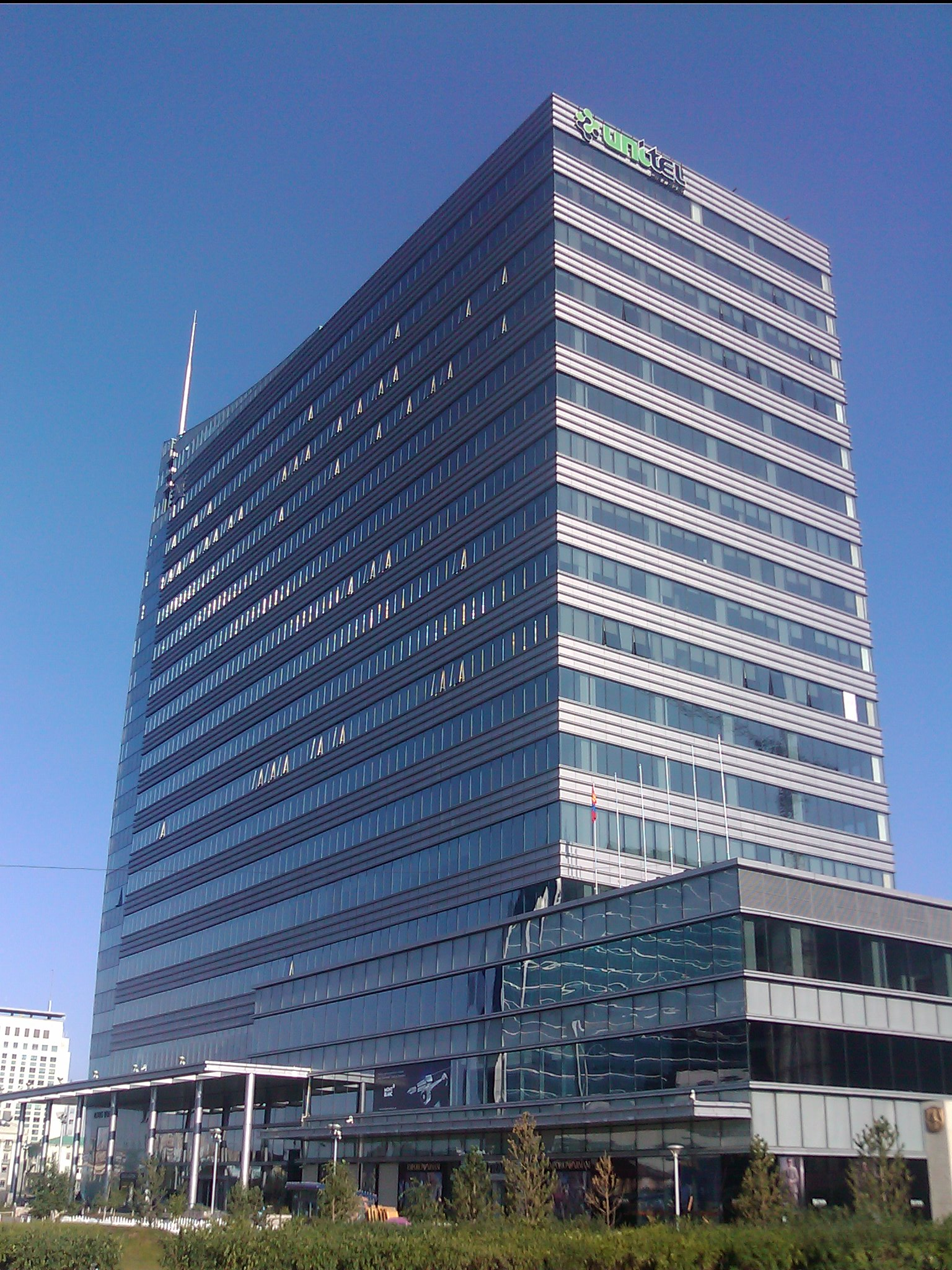
The skyscraper in August 2010

The skyscraper as viewed from Sükhbaatar Square

== See also ==
- List of tallest buildings in Mongolia
