= Altan-Ölgii National Cemetery =

Burial site in Ulaanbaatar, Mongolia

- Interactive map of Altan-Ölgii National Cemetery

Details
- Location: Bayanzürkh District, Ulaanbaatar
- Country: Mongolia
- Coordinates: 47°55′51″N 106°58′19″E
- Type: National
- Size: 4.6 hectares (46,000 m²)
- Find a Grave: Altan-Ölgii National Cemetery

The Altan-Ölgii National Cemetery (Mongolian: Алтан-Өлгий оршуулгын газар), also known as Altan-Ölgii Memorial Park (Mongolian: Алтан-Өлгий дурсгалын цэцэрлэгт хүрээлэн) since 2014, is a cemetery located in Ulaanbaatar, Mongolia. Altan-Ölgii, where Mongolian high-ranking public and government figures are buried, encompasses an area of 4.6 hectares.

== Notable burials ==
=== Choibalsan and Sukhbaatar ===
The revolutionary Damdin Sükhbaatar was buried here in 1923, but was later exhumed and reinterred into Sükhbaatar's Mausoleum together with Khorloogiin Choibalsan. The corpses of both rulers were again exhumed, ritually burned, and the ashes entombed at Altan-Ölgii in 2005.

=== Other ===
- Yumjaagiin Tsedenbal
- John Gombojab Hangin
- Zhamyangiyn Lhagvasuren
- Gonchigiin Bumtsend
- Jambyn Batmönkh
- Sanjaasürengiin Zorig
- Puntsagiin Jasrai
- Janlavyn Narantsatsralt
- Punsalmaagiin Ochirbat
