= History of Mongolia (1990–present) =

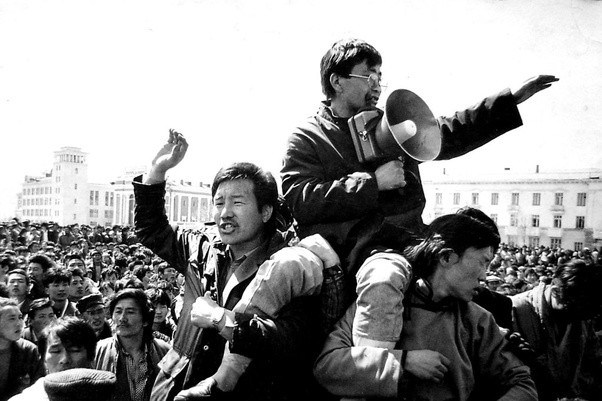
Political demonstrations led by Sanjaasürengiin Zorig at Sükhbaatar Square, during the height of the 1990 Revolution

The modern democratic era of Mongolia began after the Democratic Revolution of 1990, which occurred in the wake of the 1989 Revolutions and the collapse of the Soviet Union. The peaceful demonstrations led to the resignation of the entire politburo in March 1990, subsequently paving the way to democratization.

Up until then, the country's sole legal party was the Mongolian People's Revolutionary Party (MPRP), ruling since 1921. After the 1990 revolution, Mongolia underwent a massive political transition from a socialist one-party state to a multi-party parliamentary democracy. The first free and fair elections were held in July 1990. The democratically elected People's Great Khural established a small lower house, the State Little Khural, and elected a president, a prime minister and a vice president. A new constitution was drafted in 1991, ratified by Mongolia's first president, Punsalmaagiin Ochirbat, on 13 January 1992, and put into force on 12 February 1992. The ratification of Mongolia's fourth constitution officially ended the 68-year-old Mongolian People's Republic. The MPRP, now distanced from communism, retained its parliamentary majority in 1992. It wouldn't be until 1996 when the party transferred power to the Mongolian opposition. Since then, the Mongolian People's Party (renamed MPRP) and the Democratic Party emerged as the dominant two parties, with alternating political power.

With the end to Soviet aid in 1991, Mongolia, in its early transitional years from a planned economy to a market economy, faced a severe economic shock with a sharp decline in production, hyperinflation, high unemployment, and exacterbated poverty due to weakened social services. The implementation of privatization, market liberalization, and market-oriented reforms began gradual economic recovery in 1994. Mining in Mongolia would be the primary source of income, following a series of foreign investment in the 2000s and 2010s. Consequently, economic overdependence, environmental impacts and resource nationalism from mining became a prevalent issue alongside endemic corruption, inequality, and poverty.

Since the 1990s, Mongolia pursued a neutral foreign policy, dubbed the Third neighbor policy, at the global stage. The country has been a prominent contributor to the United Nations peacekeeping efforts, with more than 23,000 personnel deployed between 2002 and 2025.

== Prelude ==
The Mongolian People's Republic (MPR), since its establishment in 1924, had been a socialist satellite state of the Soviet Union throughout much of its existence. The two states maintained close political and economic ties in the aftermath of the Sino-Soviet split. With Soviet support, the country experienced rapid industrialisation, collectivization, and modernization along with social reforms at the cost of political, cultural, and religious freedom.

Inspired by reforms of Mikhail Gorbachev in the Soviet Union, the leadership under Jambyn Batmönkh implemented market reforms but failed to appeal to those who, in late 1989, wanted broader political and societal changes. Concepts of glasnost, freedom of speech, and economic liberties inspired the initial discussions that would lead to the revolution.

Beginning in December 1988, the ruling party's mouthpiece, Ünen (lit."Truth"), began publishing a new column called "Workers' Letters," which criticized the Politburo and party leaders for the first time. Also in December, a youth underground organization called "New Generation" (Шинэ үе) was established by young dissidents: Erdeniin Bat-Üül, Sosorbaramyn Tsogtsaikhan, and Sukhbaataryn Amarsanaa.

The first public demonstrations took place on 6 December 1989 in Erdenet, the second-largest city of the MPR. During the demonstration, protestors submitted demands to local party structures for the withdrawal of Soviet troops from Erdenet, the full nationalization of Erdenet Mining Corporation (jointly owned by the governments of the MPR and the USSR), and the resignation of the Politburo of the MPRP's Central Committee.

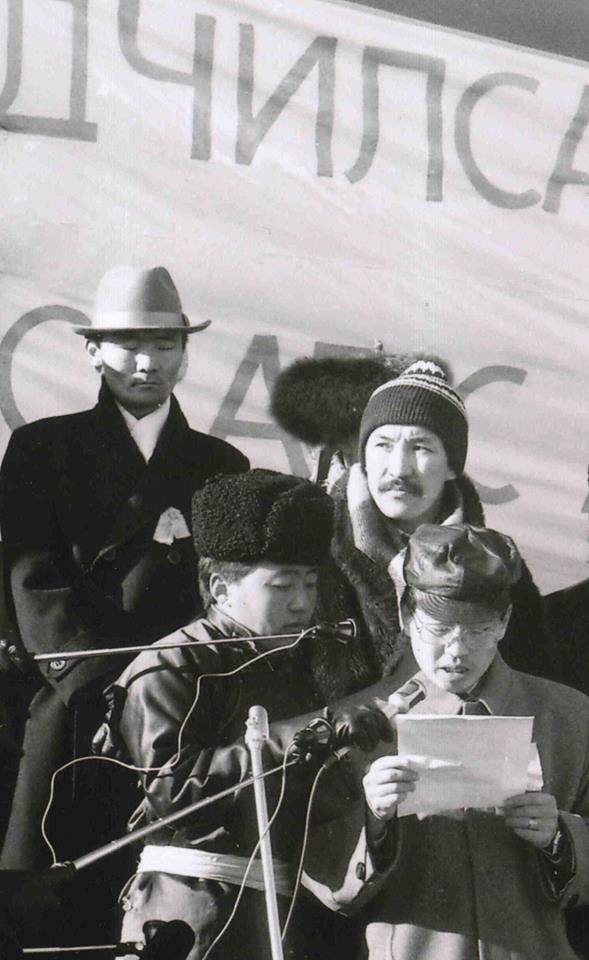
The first public demonstrations near Sükhbaatar Square, 1989

The next day, on 7 December, similar demonstrations by teachers and students took place in Ard Ayush square at Khovd, the provincial capital of Khovd Province. The demonstrators handed over demands for the resignation of the Politburo and the government to the local governing body, which were to be delivered to Ulaanbaatar, the capital.

== 1990 Democratic Revolution ==
On the morning of 10 December 1989, on International Human Rights Day, the first open pro-democracy public demonstration occurred in front of the Youth Cultural Center in Ulaanbaatar, where the creation of the Mongolian Democratic Union (MDU) was announced with Sanjaasürengiin Zorig as general organizer. At the demonstration, the MDU founders publicly petitioned the government 13-point demands, which included the full implementation of perestroika, a multi-party system, and the Universal Declaration of Human Rights in all party and government affairs.

In subsequent months, the activists led by thirteen pro-democracy leaders, later called the "Golden Sparrows of Democracy," including Tsakhiagiin Elbegdorj, Sanjaasürengiin Zorig, Erdeniin Bat-Üül, Bat-Erdeniin Batbayar and others continued to organize demonstrations, rallies, protests and hunger strikes, as well as teachers' and workers' strikes. The activists received growing support from Mongolians, both in the capital and the countryside.

On 2 January 1990, the MDU began distributing leaflets calling for a democratic revolution. In reaction to the government's refusal to comply, more aggressive demands and demonstrations occurred. On 14 January 1990, some 1000 protesters met on the square in front of the Lenin Museum in Ulaanbaatar. A demonstration at Sükhbaatar Square on 21 January (in weather of -30 C) followed. Protestors carried banners alluding to Genghis Khan, rehabilitating a figure which Soviet schooling neglected to praise. Demonstrators carried a modified Flag of Mongolia, which lacked a star symbolizing socialism; this flag would become the new flag after the revolution.

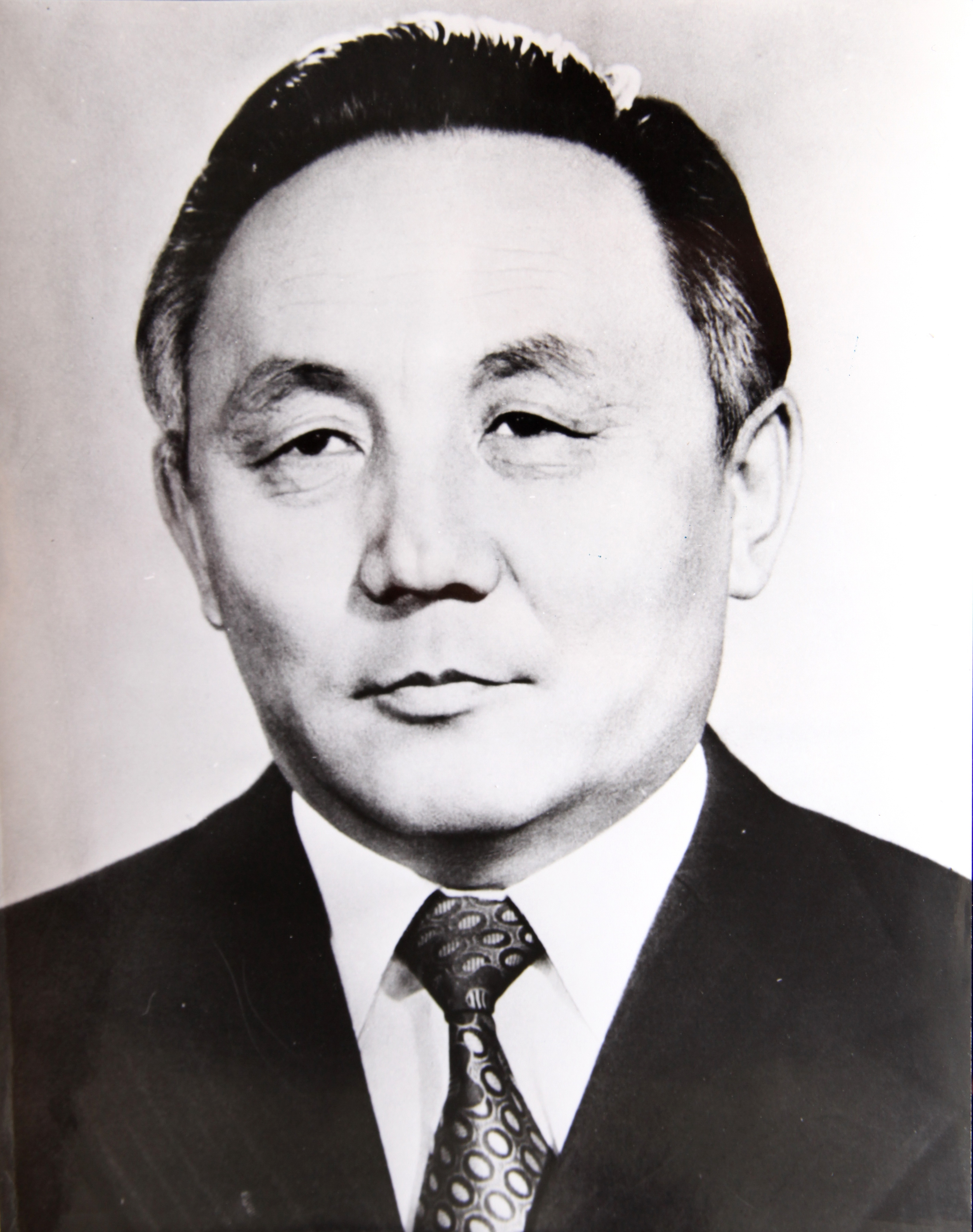
General Secretary of the MPRP Jambyn Batmönkh

After numerous demonstrations across the country, on 4 March 1990, the leading four reformist organizations held a joint outdoor mass meeting, inviting the government to attend. The government sent no representative to what became a demonstration of over 100,000 people demanding democratic change. Consequently, hunger strikes began at Sükhbaatar Square on 7 March 1990. The next day, the Politburo of the Mongolian People's Revolutionary Party (MPRP) – the highest authority of the party – gave way to the pressure and entered negotiations with the opposition leaders on 8 March 1990.

Behind the scenes, however, a military crackdown on the protesters was considered by the hardline members of the politburo. The decree enabling crackdown was written and left for general secretary Jambyn Batmönkh to approve. Batmönkh opposed the decision and maintained a strict policy of "never using force" (Хүч хэрэглэж хэрхэвч болохгүй). People present that day later recalled Batmönkh saying "I will never sign this. We few Mongols have not yet come to the point that we will make each other's noses bleed," before smacking the table and leaving the room."

An agreement was reached between the two sides after round table talks on 8-9 March 1990. Consequently, MPRP leader Jambyn Batmönkh announced his resignation and dissolution of the politburo via radio broadcast on the evening of 9 March 1990. The news was announced to the hunger strikers and to people who'd gathered on Sükhbaatar Square by Elbegdorj at 10 PM on that day. During the MPRP plenum on 12-14 March, the politburo was reshuffled with reform-minded leaders. Constitutional amendments removing the leading role of the MPRP were made by the People's Great Khural on 21-23 March, ending the 70-year-old one-party rule.

In April, the demonstrations continued, with the government restricting the freedom of assembly and the democratic leaders submitting an ultimatum demanding equal participation of all political groups. The MPRP refused to accede to the demands. However, in May, under pressure and after negotiations with members of the opposition movement, the People's Great Khural approved the Law on Political Parties. Dates for the multiparty democratic elections for the national, provincial, and municipal khurals were agreed on 14 May. In the lead up to the election, six political parties were registered by the Supreme Court of the MPR in May.

== 1990–1992: Democratic transition ==
=== 1990 parliamentary elections ===
Following the collapse of the communist regime, Mongolia's first free, multi-party legislative elections were held on 29 July 1990. Six political parties ran for 430 seats in the People's Great Khural (upper house) and 50 seats in the new State Little Khural (lower house). With opposition parties unable to nominate enough candidates, the ruling Mongolian People's Revolutionary Party (MPRP) won 357 seats and an 83% majority in the Great Khural. Members of the State Little Khural were to be elected via proportional representation. The People's Great Khural first met on 3 September and elected the president (MPRP), vice president (MSDP), prime minister (MPRP), and 50 members to the Little Khural. The vice president was also chairman of the Little Khural. The MPRP, which won 61% of the votes, received 31 of the 50 seats in the lower house.

Party	Acronym	People's Great Khural	State Little Khural
Mongolian People's Revolutionary Party	MPRP; МАХН	357	31
Mongolian Democratic Party	MDP; МоАН	16	13
Mongolian Revolutionary Youth League	MRYL; МХЗЭ	9	–
Mongolian National Progress Party	MNPP; МҮДН	6	3
Mongolian Social Democratic Party	MSDP; МСДН	4	3
Independents	–	38	–
Total		430	50
Source: Nohlen et el., GEC

The new MPRP government under Dashiin Byambasüren formed a unity government with the opposition parties and implemented constitutional and economic reforms. Two high-ranking ministers of the Byambasüren cabinet were non-MPRP ministers; these being First Deputy Prime Minister Davaadorjiin Ganbold (MNPP chairman) and Deputy Prime Minister Dambiin Dorligjav (deputy MDP chairman).

=== 1992 Constitution of Mongolia ===
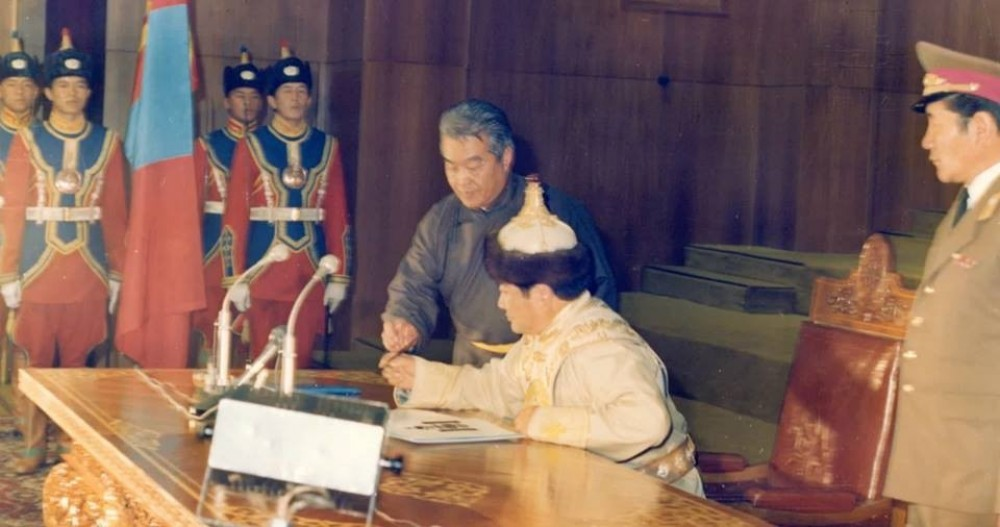
Ratification of the 1992 Constitution by President Punsalmaagiin Ochirbat on 13 January 1992

In November 1991, the People's Great Khural began discussion on a new constitution, which entered into force on 12 February 1992. In addition to establishing Mongolia as an independent, sovereign republic and guaranteeing a number of rights and freedoms, the new constitution restructured the legislative branch of government, creating a unicameral legislature, the State Great Khural.

Modified flag of the MPR and the official flag of Mongolia from 1992 to 2011

State emblem of Mongolia, adopted in 1992

State seal of Mongolia, adopted in 1992

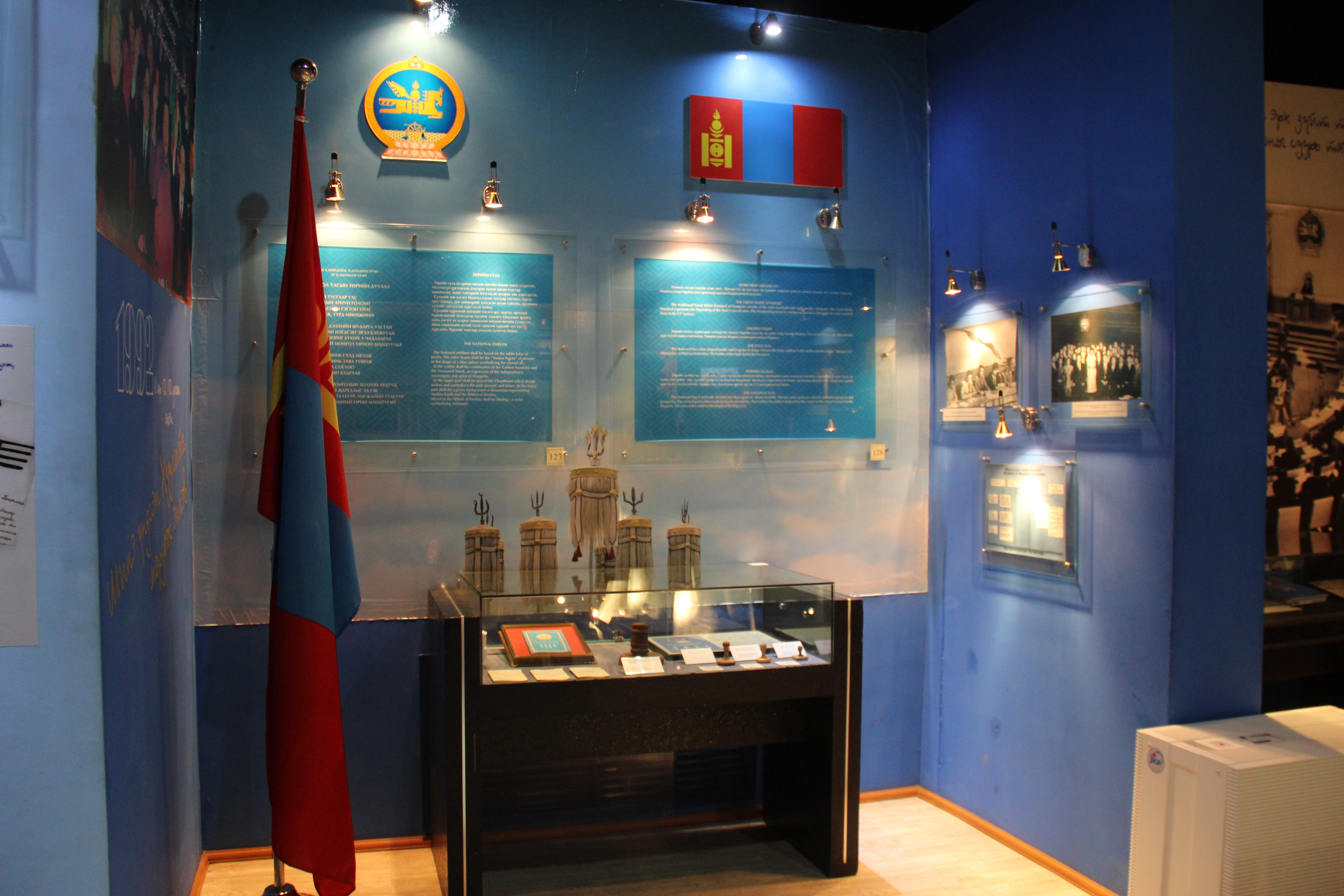
National symbols and founding documents at the National Museum of Mongolia

=== Economy ===
In the early and mid-1990s, with the collapse of the Soviet Union, which had until 1990 provided significant economic aid to Mongolia's state budget, the country faced severe economic problems dating back to the 1980s. Foreign trade collapsed, economic and technical aid from the former socialist countries ended, and the domestic economy struggled with privatization. Inflation rose, stores' shelves were depleted, and ration cards for food were issued for a period of time. A thriving black market had arisen in Ulaanbaatar by 1988 to meet the needs of the populace.

== 1990s after the transition ==
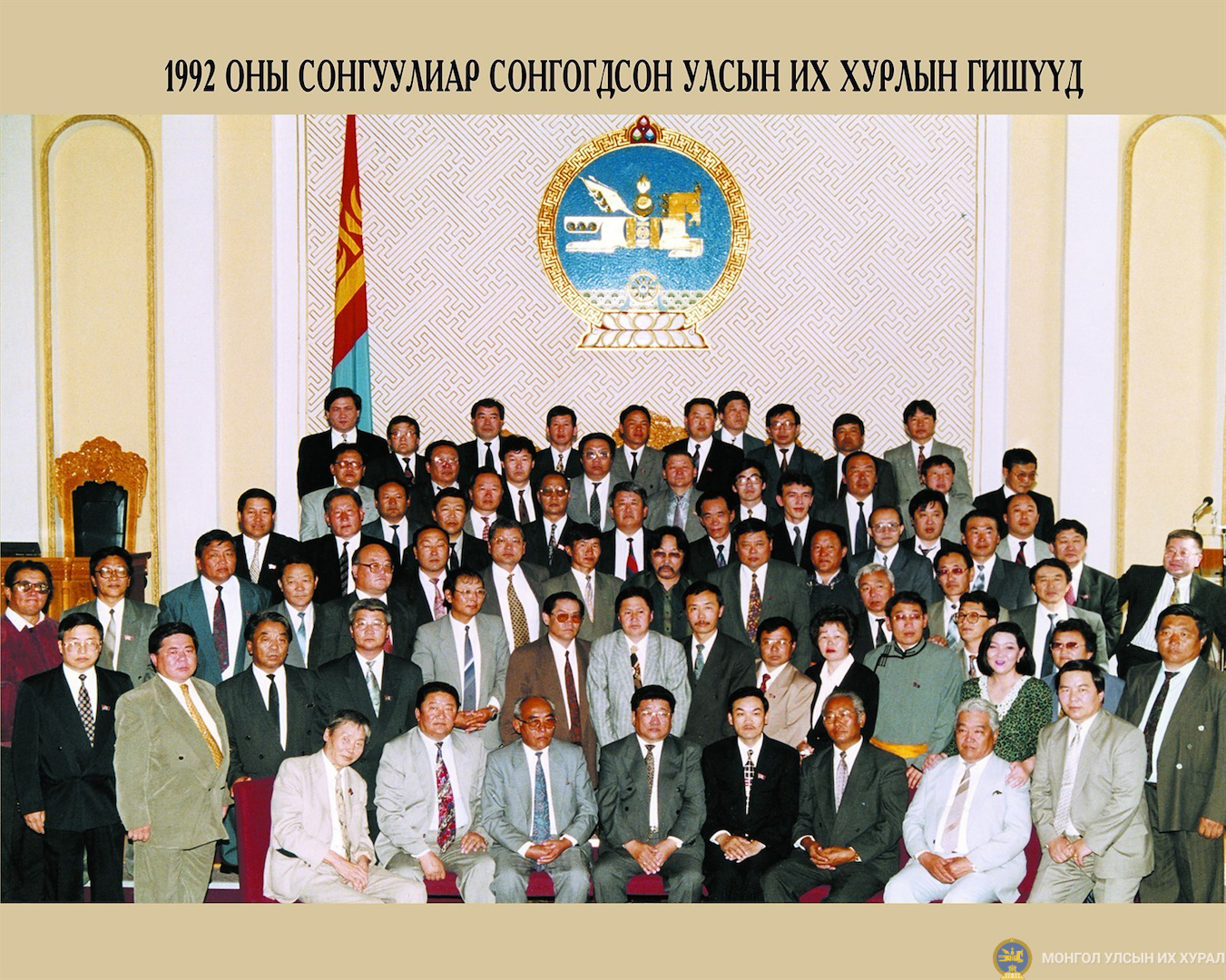
President Punsalmaagiin Ochirbat (front center) and members of the first State Great Khural in 1992

In the same year the constitution was ratified, the 1992 elections for the newly established unicameral State Great Khural were held on June 30. The MPRP won another round of elections, winning 70 out of 76 seats in the State Great Khural. Economist Puntsagiin Jasrai was elected the next prime minister of an all-MPRP cabinet. The main opposition alliance, the Democratic Alliance between the MDP, the MNPP, and the Mongolian United Party, won four seats while the MSDP and an independent won a single seat. The Mongolian National Democratic Party (MNDP) was founded by the consolidation of the Democratic Alliance in October 1992.

The new constitution also provided that the President of Mongolia was to be elected by a popular vote rather than by the legislature as before. Incumbent Punsalmaagiin Ochirbat became Mongolia's first popularly elected president, winning the 1993 presidential election with two-thirds of the vote. Originally a member of the MPRP, Ochirbat ran as the joint opposition candidate for the MNDP and the MSDP after his party nominated orthodox party member, Lodongiin Tüdev, as their candidate. For the first time in its history, the MPRP was electorally defeated in 1993.

=== Democratic administration ===
In the 1996 parliamentary elections, the Democratic Union Coalition (DUC) won 50 of the 76 seats in the State Great Khural, co-led by Tsakhiagiin Elbegdorj as the chairman of the MNDP. The MPRP lost its parliamentary majority and was out of power for the first time since 1921.

Despite their electoral success, reforms by the government received mixed reactions upon implementation. Prime minister Mendsaikhany Enkhsaikhan, elected in 1996, oversaw a period of rising unemployment and inflation. Later the next year, the MPRP leader, Natsagiin Bagabandi, was overwhelmingly elected as president in 1997, defeating sitting president Ochirbat, who ran from the DUC.

DUC prime ministers of Mongolia between 1996 and 2000

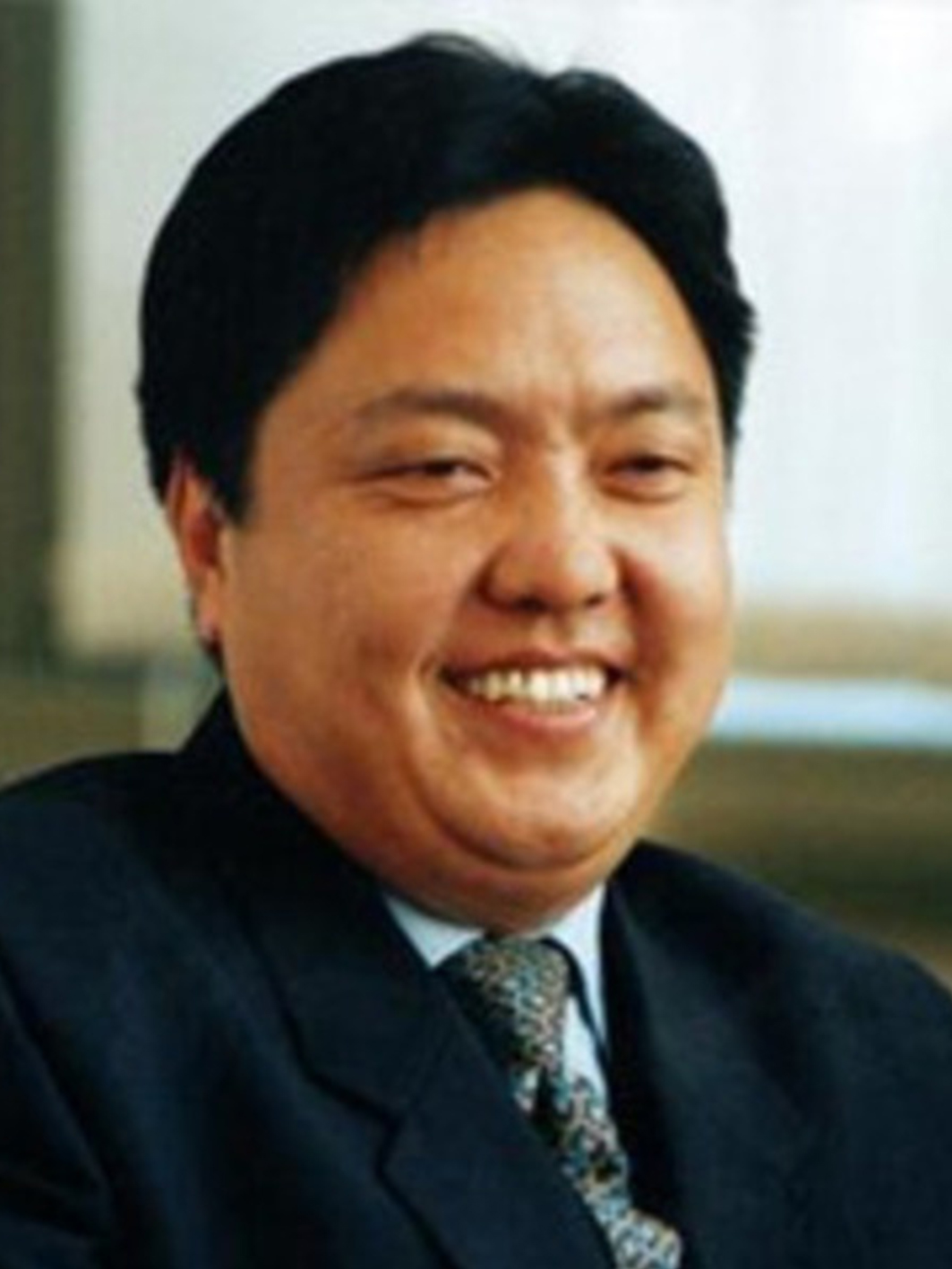
Mendsaikhany Enkhsaikhan
(1996–1998)

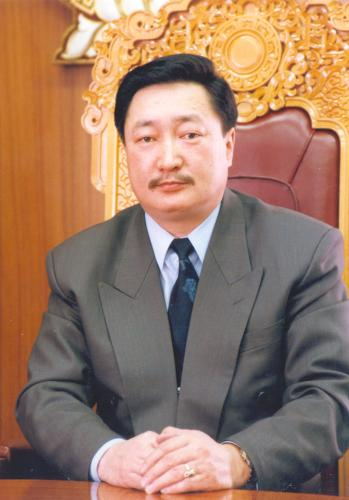
Janlavyn Narantsatsralt
(1998–1999)

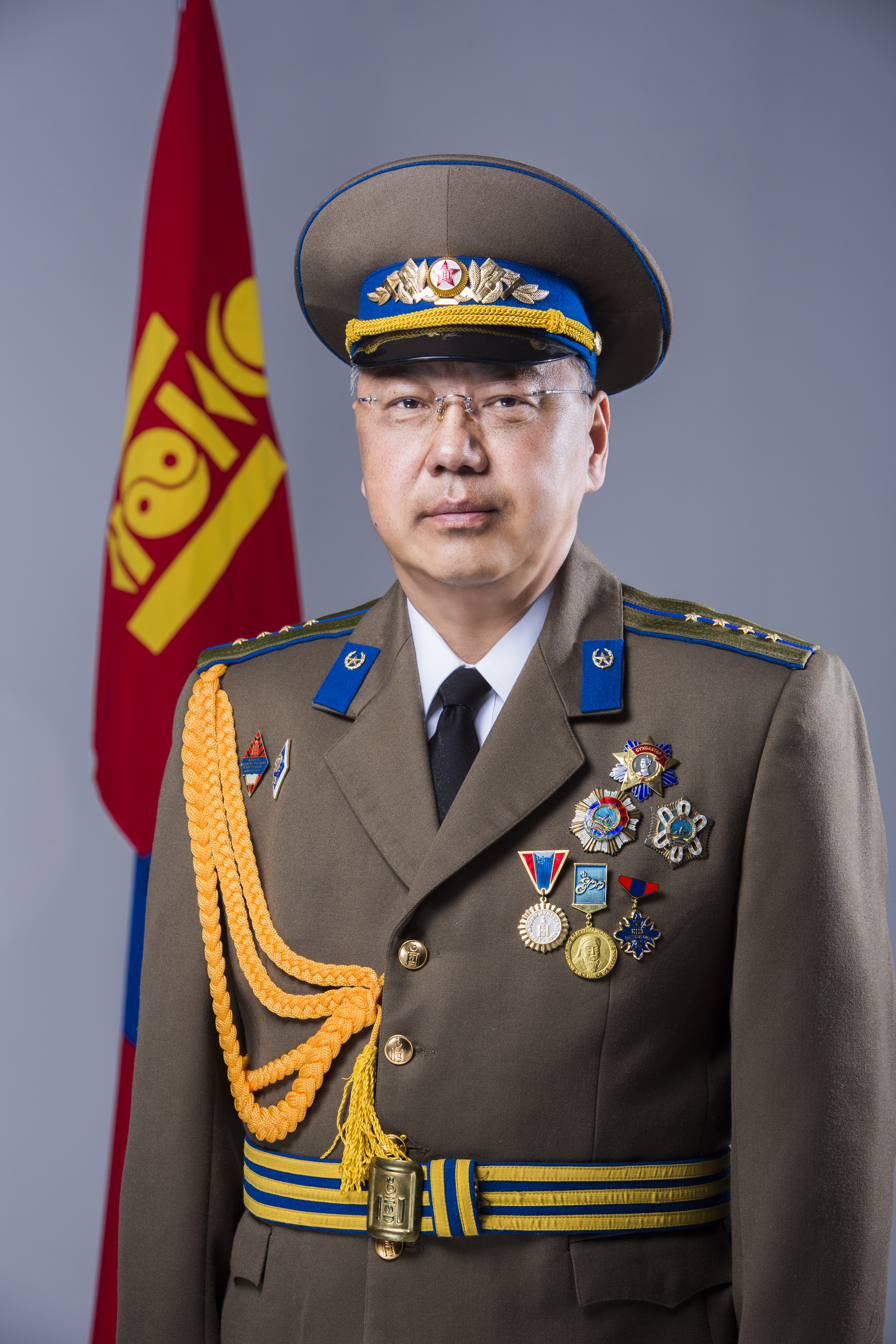
Rinchinnyamyn Amarjargal
(1999–2000)

In January 1998, the constitutional clause forbiding lawmakers from ministerial responsibilities was removed. In the wake of the impact of the 1997 Asian financial crisis, political maneuvers by several DUC legislators were made to increase the coordination of parliament and the cabinet. Later on 27 March 1998, the MNDP's highest decision-making body called for prime minister Enkhsaikhan to resign. Due to the increased political pressure, Enkhsaikhan resigned on 17 April 1998, later replaced by MNDP leader Elbegdorj on 23 April 1998.

The prolonged formation of Elbegdorj's nine-member cabinet lasted from 27 April to 28 May 1998. The age and experience of several cabinet members were questioned by the MPRP and the public. Parliamentary procedures were boycotted by the opposition following a controversial decision to merge an insolvent state-owned bank, the Reconstruction Bank, with privately owned Golomt Bank. The impasse blocked key bills throughout June and led to a motion of no confidence in July when a parliamentary working group found the merger improper. On 25 July 1998, Elbegdorj's cabinet was ousted with 42 lawmakers against and 33 in favor. He became the then shortest-serving prime minister of Mongolia, with only three months in office, and remained caretaker until a successor was nominated and appointed.

In August 1998, the Erdenet Mining Corporation (EMC), the largest state revenue contributor and joint venture owned by Mongolia and Russia, came under a controversy when it was found that it hadn't paid its due tax and royalty in time. An audit of the EMC was ordered, which later revealed that the state-due income was embezzled into dubious accounts of EMC directors, notably its chairman Sh.Otgonbileg, instead of the state account. The chairman was forcibly dismissed on 20 August 1998, and a brief special regime was installed in EMC until agreements were reached.

=== Political crisis ===
Elbegdorj's successors were repeatedly blocked by president Natsagiin Bagabandi and the parliamentary minority. Five nominations of Davaadorjiin Ganbold in August, and nominations of foreign minister Rinchinnyamyn Amarjargal and Erdeniin Bat-Üül in September were rejected by Bagabandi. Without two-thirds parliament majority (51 seats), the DUC couldn't override presidential vetoes by Bagabandi, leaving Elbegdorj as caretaker. The three nominees were rejected by Bagabandi a total of 11 times (Ganbold was rejected 7 times alone) on the premise of inexperience. A fourth nominee, approved by Bagabandi, was voted out by parliament.

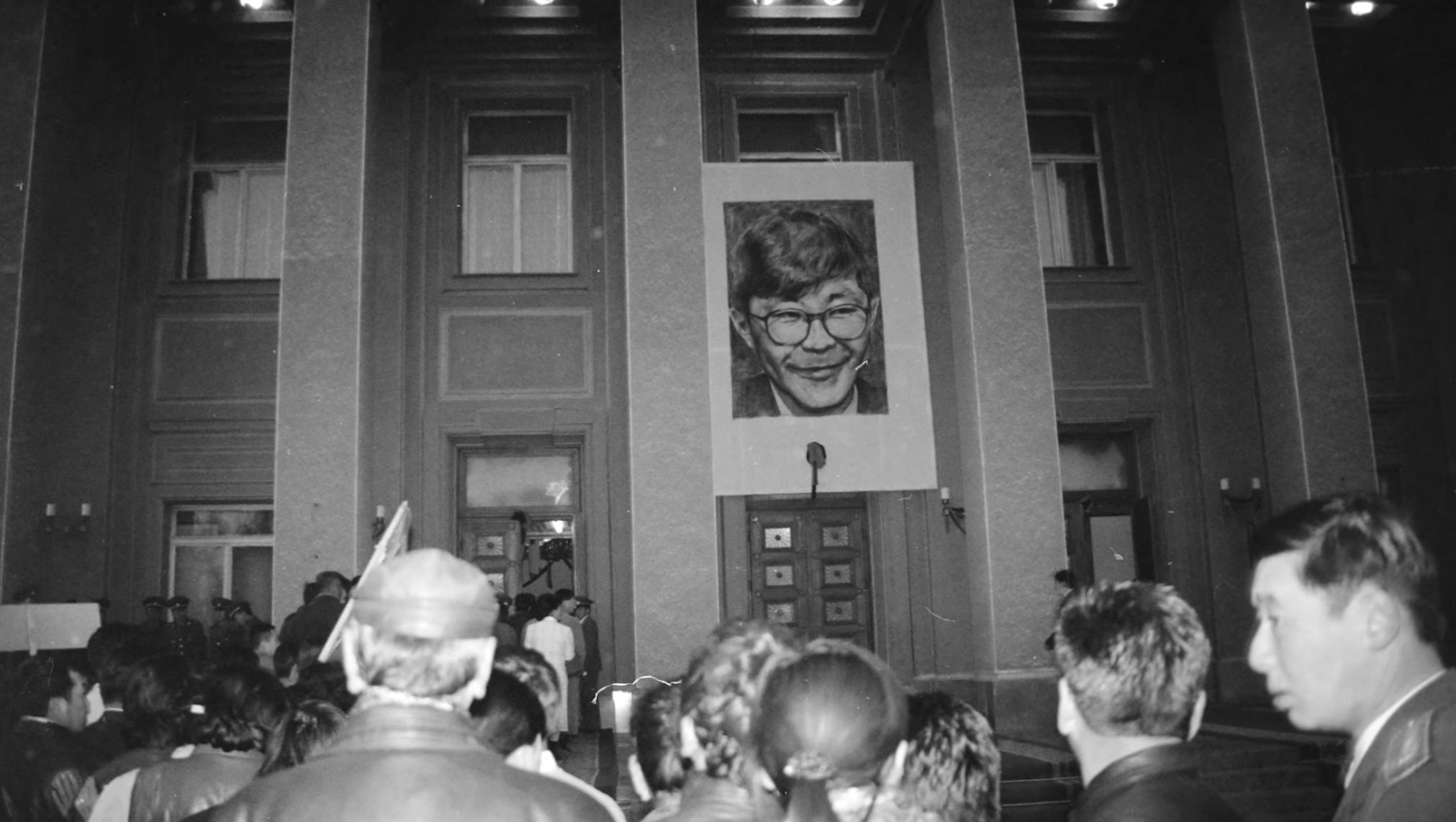
State funeral of Sanjaasürengiin Zorig on 5 October 1998, three days after his death; around 30,000 people gathered to pay tribute to the late minister

On 2 October 1998, Sanjaasürengiin Zorig, lead figure of the 1990 revolution and sitting infrastructure minister, was assassinated at his home, the same day coalition leaders agreed to nominate him to the premiership. The motives of his murder, assumed political by the general public, remains unknown and unresolved to this day. A national mourning was declared following his death. Zorig's sister, Sanjaasürengiin Oyun, ran and was elected to assume his seat in a by-election.

Two months after the assassination of Zorig, Ulaanbaatar mayor Janlavyn Narantsatsralt was approved as prime minister on 9 December 1998. As a non-member of parliament, his cabinet fully consisted of ministers who held no legislative seats, the first cabinet of Mongolia to do so. However, his tenure ended in July 1999 when he was voted out by the MSDP and the MPRP due to backlash from a letter sent to Russia regarding the EMC. Rinchinnyamyn Amarjargal superseded as premier and served until the upcoming elections in 2000.

In 1999, Mongolia's economy took a hit due to the 1998 Russian financial crisis and the bankruptcy of the Reconstruction Bank. Additionally, an extremely harsh winter, known as dzud, in the winter of 1999 adversely affected the country's largely agricultural economy.

== 2000s ==
=== Extreme dzuds and droughts ===
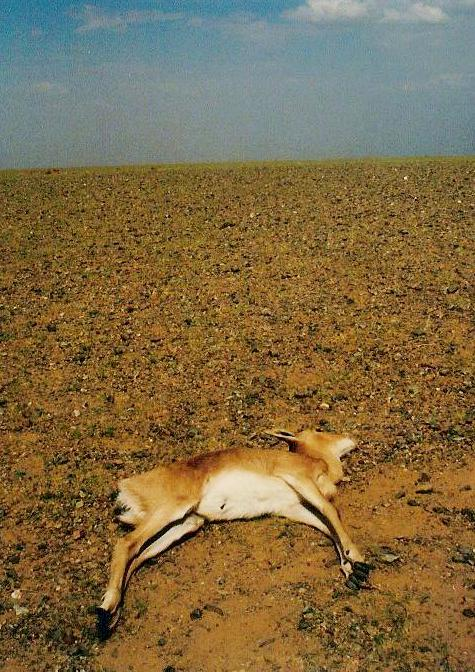
A Mongolian gazelle that has died of drought, due to the third straight year of dzud, 2001

In 1999 and 2000, Mongolia experienced its worst winter since 1968, in the form of consecutive dzuds which has been the cumulative result of a drought in 1999, dubbed the 'black dzud'. On 11 February 2000, the Mongolian government appealed to the international community for assistance following the commencement of relief efforts in December 1999. 3 million livestocks, which accounted for 10% of total livestocks, were reported dead, with some estimates of total livestock deaths over 5 million; and with further 400,000 people (16% of the population) affected. More than 650 million tugriks (approximately USD 600,000) were made available by the government for the purchase of relief items. Moreover, Mongolia's GDP growth fell from 3.1% in 1999 to just 1.1% in 2000.

Drought in the summer of 2000 left 50 per cent of the country dry, 20 per cent suffering from severe water shortage and over 450,000 people in 13 provincial districts affected by food shortages in the immediate term. Another dzud in 2000 and 2001 affected 20 of the 21 provinces and half of the total counties, with many areas recording the coldest temperatures over the last fifty years. Twelve herders and over 600,000 livestocks died in the severe winterstorms, as low as -50 celsius, in December 2000 and January 2001. On 14 January 2001, Nine people from the UNDAC, the international media, and the Government of Mongolia tragically lost their lives in a helicopter crash while carrying out dzud assessment in Malchin district, Uvs Province. In February 2001, the United Nations launched an appeal for $8.7million to support herders affected by the multi-year dzuds and droughts. Ultimately, the three consecutive dzuds, in 1999–2000, 2000–2001, and 2001–2002, led to a combined loss of 11 million animals.

=== MPRP landslide victory ===
In the lead up to the election, political discord within the coalition caused the DUC to fracture in early 2000. The decision by MSDP lawmakers to vote against the coalition led to the re-founding of the Mongolian Democratic Party (MDP) by Sodnomzunduin Erdene and MNDP dissidents in January 2000. The MDP further split in March 2000, when Sanjaasürengiin Oyun founded the Civil Will Party (CWP) with former allies of Zorig. In April 2000, the MSDP left the coalition and fielded its own candidates, leaving the MNDP and the Mongolian Religious Democratic Party in the coalition.

In the 2000 parliamentary election, the DUC witnessed a major electoral wipeout, securing only a single seat won by ex-premier Narantsatsralt. In contrast, the MPRP won a supermajority of 72 seats. The MPRP-controlled parliament appointed party chairman Nambaryn Enkhbayar as prime minister on 26 July 2000. Following their election defeat, the five former member parties of the DUC merged to form the Democratic Party (DP) in December 2000.

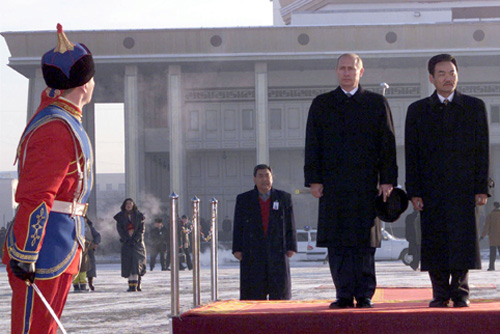
Russian President Vladimir Putin with President Natsagiin Bagabandi during his state visit to Mongolia, November 2000

During the tenure of Enkhbayar, talks regarding Mongolia's large debt to the former Soviet Union were extensively made between the governments of Mongolia and Russia. Efforts to strengthen trade ties with Russia were previously made but were largely disrupted by the issue of Mongolia's debt, locally referred to as the "Great Debt" (Их өр), estimated to be around USD$11 billion.

In November 2000, then-Russian president Vladimir Putin visited Ulaanbaatar—the first by a Russian head of state since Leonid Brezhnev in 1974 and one of Putin's first state visits. Major bilateral treaties were signed to lower price of oil and energy exports to Mongolia and enhance cross-border trade. Series of other visits were made to improve bilateral ties, notably visits of premier Mikhail Kasyanov in 2002 and prime minister Nambaryn Enkhbayar in June 2003. In December 2003, the Russian government wrote off 98% of Mongolia's debt, leaving a negotiated payment of USD$300 million. An agreement was signed to build an oil pipeline from Russia to China through Mongolia, though this project never materialized.

In January 2001, the "Millenium Road," grand road infrastructure project, was launched by the government to mark the country's new millenium. The road project, estimated to be over 2,400 kilometres long, was to connect the western and easternmost points of the country and all 21 provinces to Ulaanbaatar. However, due to the high costs, the road wasn't initially fully surfaced over its full length. It was later fully completed in 2022.

Despite a much formidable opposition, president Bagabandi was re-elected with 59% of the vote in the 2001 presidential election. With the presidency, premiership, and parliament secured, the MPRP oversaw a relatively coordinated administration. Primary opposition parties to the MPRP—the DP, the Motherland Party, and the CWP—began reorganizing and formed the Motherland Democratic Coalition (MDC) in July 2003.

=== Coalition government ===
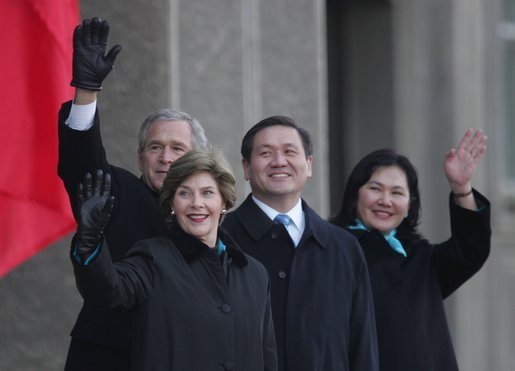
US President George W. Bush and first lady Laura Bush with President Nambaryn Enkhbayar and first lady Onongiin Tsolmon during their historic visit to Mongolia, 2005

The 2004 parliamentary election resulted in a hung parliament between the MPRP and the MDC, with the MPRP as the plurality. There were concerns of electoral fraud in the 2004 election, but they were largely ignored. Without absolute majority, both sides formed a grand coalition government led by MDC chairman Tsakhiagiin Elbegdorj. Much like the previous Democratic coalition, the MDC would oversee frequent political scandals, crises, and infighting. The MDC was dissolved in December 2004 due to party disagreements over the upcoming presidential race in 2005.

Five parliamentary parties were eligible to run in the 2005 presidential election. All except the Civil Will Party nominated their candidates for the race, leading to Mongolia's first-ever four-way presidential election. Former prime minister and MPRP leader Nambaryn Enkhbayar won the election with 54% of the vote. By-election for Enkhbayar's seat was held in August 2005, in which succeeding party chairman Miyeegombyn Enkhbold won. Prime minister Elbegdorj was forced to backdown from running in the race due to pressure from coalition partner, the MPRP.

Economic slowdown and party disputes during his tenure led to the formation of three splinter parties – the New National Party and the People's Party, and the reformed Mongolian Social Democratic Party. The defection of five DP lawmakers to the MPRP, tipped the political balance to the MPRP in late 2005. Consequently, MPRP ministers, making up half of the cabinet, left the government in January 2006. With the collapse of Elbegdorj's tenure, a new cabinet by the MPRP was established the same month with the support of defectors and third parties. A government reshuffle took place at the end of 2007, when the MPRP decided to replace its party chairman, Miyeegombyn Enkhbold, with Sanjiin Bayar.

=== Political upheaval ===
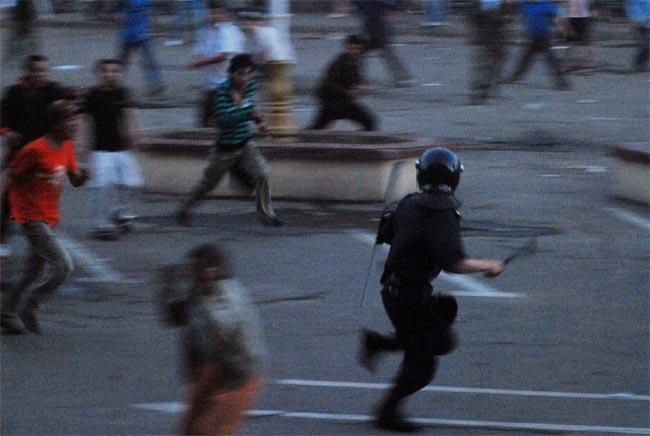
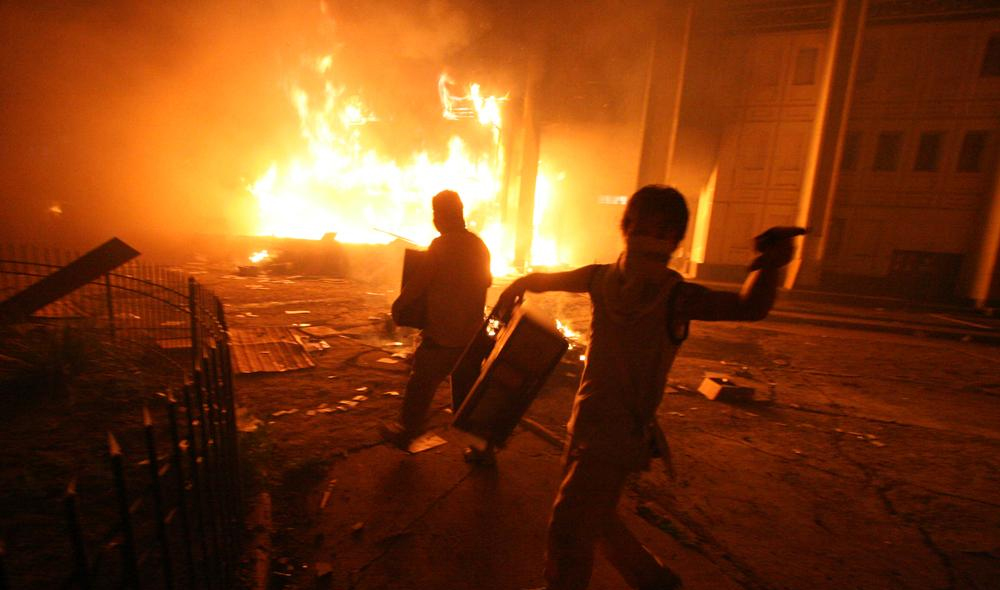
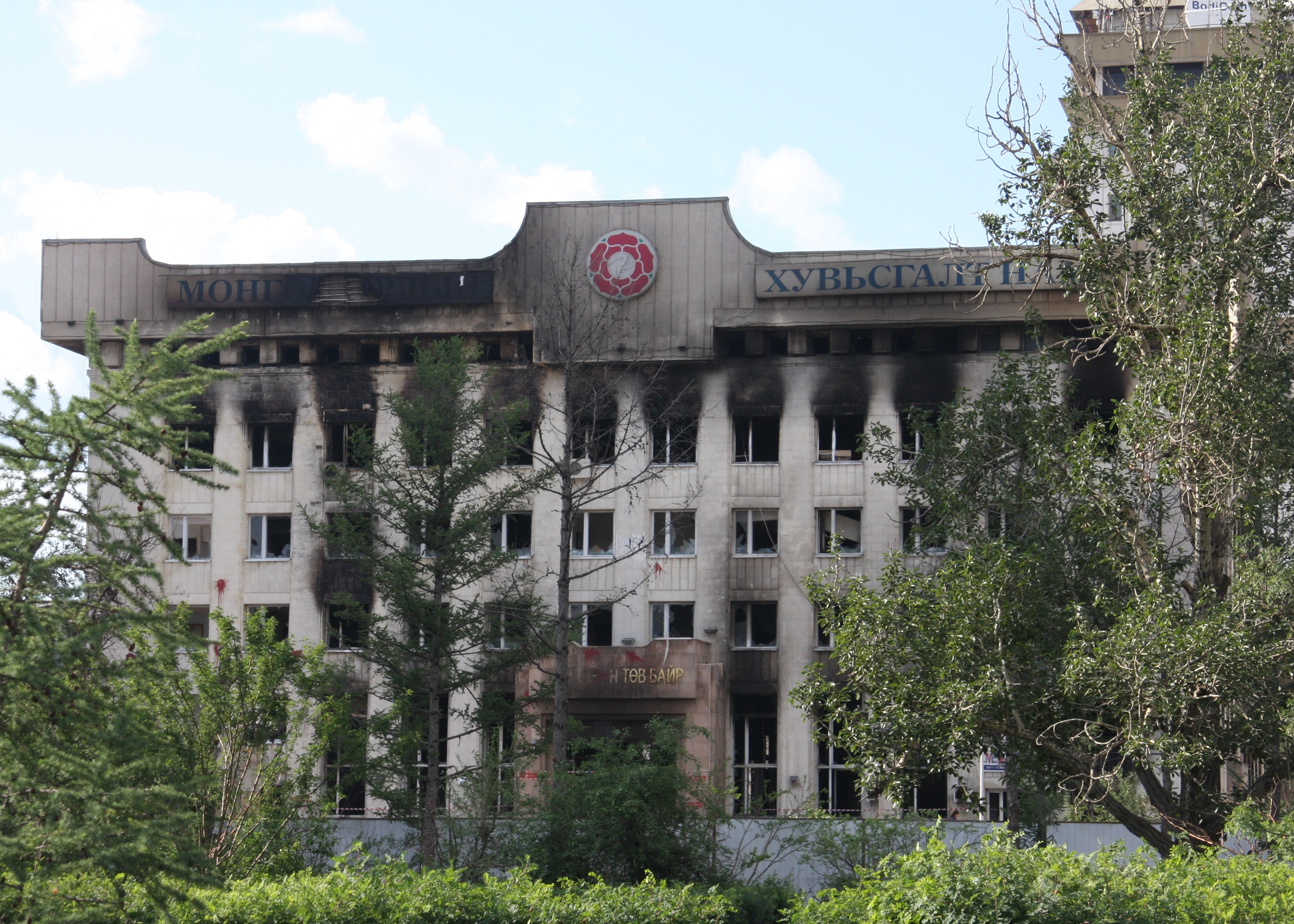
Scenes of the riots on 1-2 July 2008

In the June 2008 parliamentary elections, preliminary results showed the MPRP with a majority. Allegations of electoral fraud surrounding the election were declared by the chairman of the DP and former prime minister Elbegdorj on 1 July 2008. Elbegdorj, Bazarsadyn Jargalsaikhan (Republican Party leader), Jalbasurengiin Batzandan, and Otgonjargalyn Magnai (Civic Movement Party leaders) called on the people to contest the results.

The initial peaceful demonstrations, amplified by opposition leaders, soon turned into a riot. The riot resulted in Mongolia's first state of emergency, lasting four days. The military was brought into the city to quell the riot. Five people were killed by the police, over 300 people were injured, the headquarters of the ruling MPRP was set on fire, and many nearby shops and galleries were looted by rioters. Locally, the event came to be known as the Black Day. Then-leaders of the MPRP, prime minister Sanjiin Bayar and president Nambaryn Enkhbayar, faced intense backlash from the public due to allegations of human rights abuse, economic mismanagement, and electoral fraud. The opening of the newly-elected State Great Khural in July was boycotted by the opposition for a month.

=== First Olympic gold medal ===
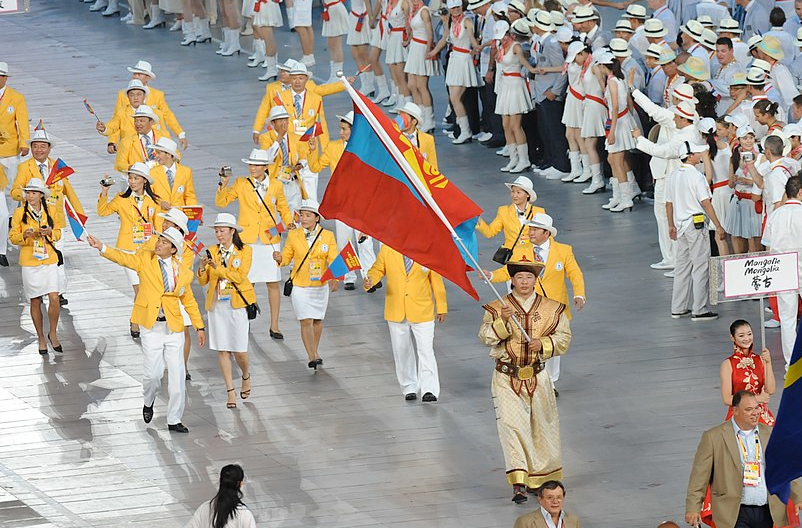
The Olympic Team of Mongolia at the opening ceremony of the 2008 Beijing Summer Olympics; judoka Naidangiin Tüvshinbayar won the country's first Olympic gold medal in 2008

Meanwhile also in August 2008, the 2008 Summer Olympics were held in Beijing. In the 2008 Olympics, the 29-athlete Olympic team of Mongolia competed in seven events. Naidangiin Tüvshinbayar won Mongolia's first ever Olympic gold medal in judo on 14 August 2008. The following night, massive celebrations occurred in Ulaanbaatar. On Sükhbaatar Square, Mongolia's president, prime minister, and members of parliament celebrated the occasion with thousands of people in front of the Government Palace. Soon, Enkhbatyn Badar-Uugan won a gold medal in boxing on 24 August 2008 and became the second Mongolian to win an Olympic gold. The 2008 Summer Olympics have been Mongolia's most successful games ever.

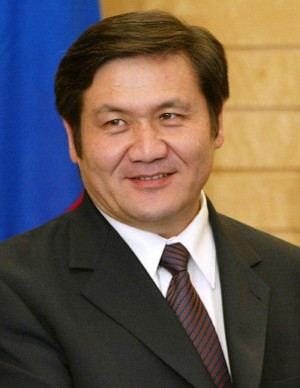
Nambaryn Enkhbayar, first Mongolian to serve as speaker, prime minister, and president, founded the Mongolian People's Revolutionary Party, the main third-party force from 2010 to 2021.

After a month-long boycott, the State Great Khural was finally convened on 28 August 2008. Incumbent prime minister Bayar was re-elected (65-1) led a coalition government between the MPRP and the DP on 11 September 2008. During the second cabinet of Bayar, the long-stalled Oyu Tolgoi project, one of Mongolia's most financially undertaking mining project, was put into motion. The Mongolian government signed a major investment agreement with Ivanhoe Mines and Rio Tinto to mine Oyu Tolgoi on 6 October 2009. However, this 2009 agreement faced intense public backlash over several issues, primarily corruption and undermining of Mongolia's interests. Bayar soon resigned on 28 October 2009 due to declining health. He was succeeded by Sükhbaataryn Batbold (MPRP) as prime minister in 2009 and later as party chairman in 2010.

In the 2009 presidential election, Democratic candidate Tsakhiagiin Elbegdorj defeated incumbent president Nambaryn Enkhbayar.

== 2010s ==
Despite being heavily hit by the 2008 financial crisis and the 2008-2009 winters, Mongolia's economy saw immense growth starting from 2010, thanks to a boom in the country's growing mining sector. The country saw a rapid double-digit GDP growth, and was considered one of the fastest-growing economies in the world. Due to its immense mineral resources, Mongolia was nicknamed "Mine-golia" and the next Asian tiger. IMF forecast of Mongolia's economic growth in 2011 was at 17.5%.

In November 2010, the MPRP would restore its original 1921 name, the Mongolian People's Party (MPP), and ideologically shifted from democratic socialism to social democracy. This change provoked Enkhbayar's faction within the party to split and form the splinter Mongolian People's Revolutionary Party.

=== Democratic comeback ===
In January 2012, the DP made a decision to leave the coalition government before the upcoming June elections. In the 2012 parliamentary elections, the DP won 31 out of 76 seats, becoming the largest party in parliament, whilst the MPP came second and the new Justice Coalition (JC), between the MPRP and the MNDP, came third. It was the first incident of a parallel voting method being used. A coalition government was formed by the DP with the MPP, the Justice Coalition, and the Civil Will–Green Party. In the 2012 local elections, the MPP was defeated for the first time in the country's history.

Following the election, the DP chairman Norovyn Altankhuyag, appointed as prime minister on 10 August 2012, formed a coalition government led by the DP with the JC and the CWGP after lengthy negotiations. The DP's ascension to power coincided with a rapid economic boom largely attributed to the country's mining mega-projects, notably the Oyu Tolgoi project. However, in May 2012, a major legislation restricting foreign direct investment (FDI) and the sale of stakes in Mongolian mining companies was passed by the outgoing parliament. Despite the reappeal and replacement of the law in late 2013 and again in 2015, a significant impact on investor confidence was made.

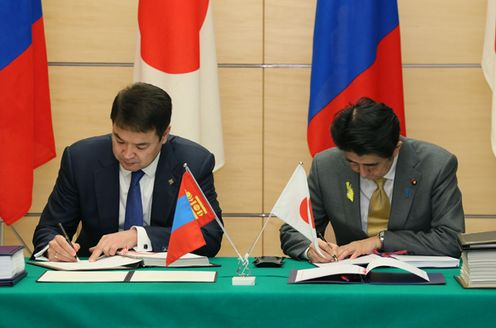
Multiple high-level visits and meetings were made by Mongolia and Japan between 2013 and 2016; bilateral relations reached a milestone with the signing of the Economic Partnership Agreement in February 2015.

In the 2013 presidential election, incumbent president Elbegdorj was re-elected in a three-way race. The DP held the office of the presidency, the prime minister, and the majority of parliament from 2012 to 2016.

Large-scale bonds, the most significant ones being the Chinggis Bond and the Samurai Bond, were introduced by the government to fund ambitious infrastructure projects. Disagreements between the government and Rio Tinto over various issues led to a halt in the second phase of the Oyu Tolgoi project in 2013.

=== Economic crash ===
Starting from 2014, Mongolia's economic growth started to stagnate as foreign debt and inflation rose and global commodity price plummeted. In November 2014, sitting prime minister and DP chairman Norovyn Altankhuyag was ousted by majority MPs amid the economic stagnation and corruption allegations. DP legislator Chimediin Saikhanbileg was appointed the next prime minister and DP speaker Zandaakhüügiin Enkhbold assumed the party chairmanship. The cabinet of Saikhanbileg, composed of the DP, the MPP, and the JC, focused primarily on economic stabilization and the mining sector.

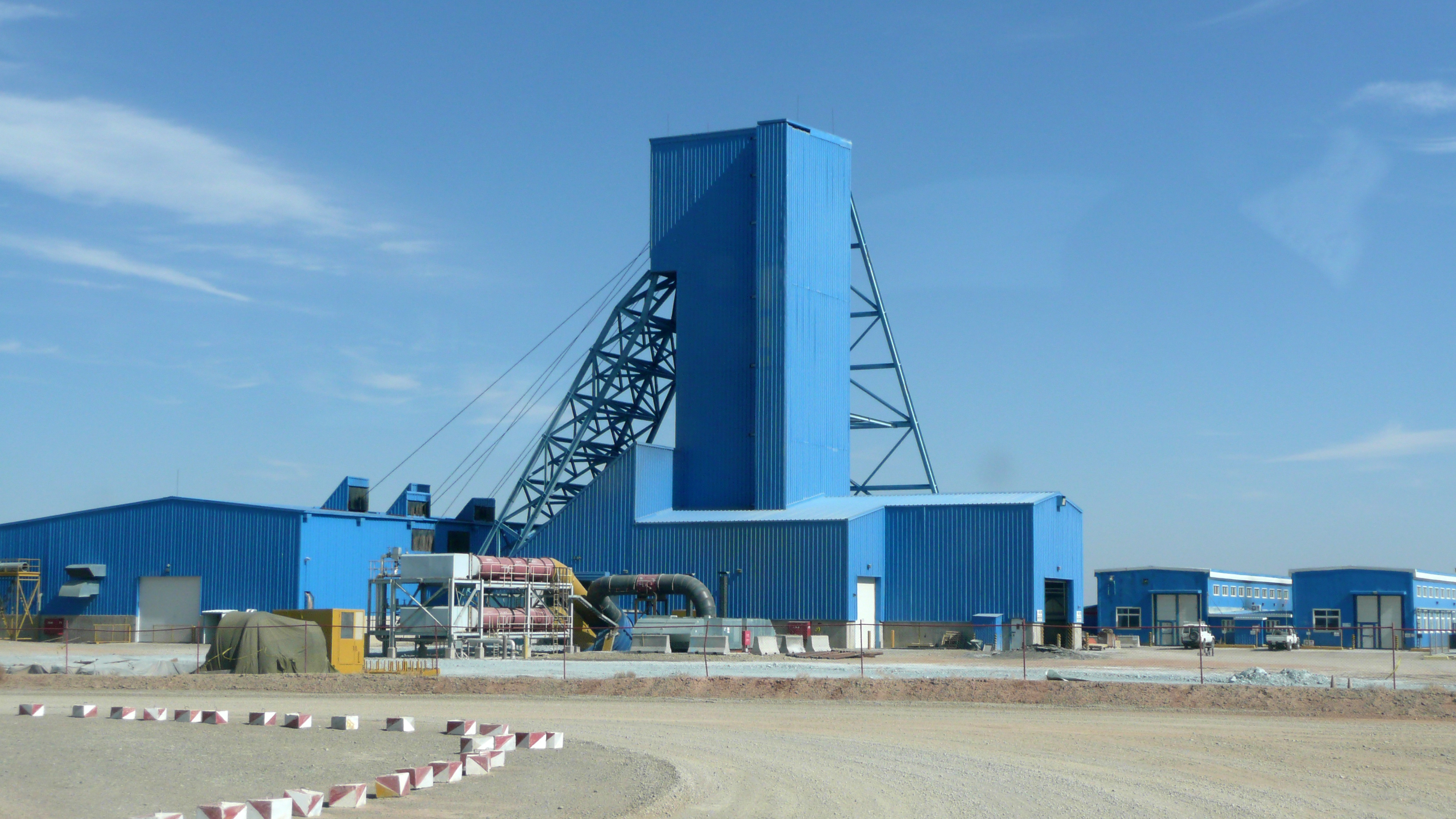
The investment deal for the underground expansion of Oyu Tolgoi mine restarted the two-year long stalled development but faced immense political scrutiny.

During Saikhanbileg's tenure, an investment agreement with Rio Tinto was reached in 2015, further progressing Oyu Tolgoi's stalled underground expansion. The deal, known locally as the "Dubai agreement" (Дубайн гэрээ), brought US$5.4 billion to Oyu Tolgoi but came under scrutiny for concerns of debt accumulation and corruption in the years leading up to 2019. A cabinet reshuffle in 2015 ousted the MPP from the cabinet amid political instability. In one of his last decisions, Saikhanbileg approved the purchase of Russian shares of Erdenet Mining Corporation before the June 2016 election; which was met with intense political backlash. Russian state-owned Rostec held 49% of Erdenet copper, Mongolia's largest state revenue provider, since 2008.

Foreign investment recovered starting from 2015 but by 2016, the economic forecast of Mongolia's growth by the IMF was just at 0.4%. The economic free fall and growing DP unpopularity promptly led to a landslide MPP victory in the 2016 parliamentary election.

=== Supermajority of the MPP ===
Compared to the MPP's supermajority of 65 seats, the DP's majority was reduced to only nine seats. MPP chairman Miyeegombyn Enkhbold was elected the parliamentary speaker, and Jargaltulgyn Erdenebat was appointed the prime minister.

Family photo of the 11th Asia–Europe Meeting summit, 15 July 2016

On 15-16 July 2016, the 11th Asia–Europe Meeting (ASEM) summit was hosted in Ulaanbaatar, Mongolia. The summit brought the heads of state and government from 53 ASEM partners—30 European and 21 Asian countries, as well as the European Union and the ASEAN. As one of the first major international summits hosted by Mongolia, extensive efforts and organization were made by then-outgoing president Elbegdorj and prime minister Saikhanbileg in the lead up to the event which coincided with the election.

In February 2017, Mongolia was bailed out by the International Monetary Fund (IMF) and other partners with a $5.5 billion economic stabilization package, considered then the fourth-largest package in IMF history. Due to the economic crisis, Mongolia struggled to repay a $580 million sovereign-guaranteed debt due in March 2017. Aid worth $3 billion was provided by the Asian Development Bank, World Bank, and bilateral partners including Japan and South Korea while a swap line worth 15 billion yuan ($2.19 billion) was offered by the People's Bank of China. Additionally, three-year $440 million loan was provided by the IMF.

The 2017 presidential election was the first time no candidates met the required 50% majority vote. The MPRP's nominee Sainkhüügiin Ganbaatar effectively split the MPP vote to Battulga's favour, coming in third with only a thousand-vote difference with MPP candidate Enkhbold. The first-ever presidential runoff was held in July between the MPP nominee Miyeegombyn Enkhbold and DP nominee Khaltmaagiin Battulga. Despite the high number of protest votes called by Ganbaatar, Battulga's populist and nationalist campaign, similar to that of Donald Trump's 2016 campaign, led to him winning 50.6% of the popular vote, beating Enkhbold by only 9.4%. The share of blank votes in a presidential election reached its historic highest at 8%. Infighting between the Enkhbold-led camp of 32 legislators and the Ukhnaagiin Khürelsükh-led camp of 33 legislators occurred in the subsequent months following the MPP's electoral defeat.

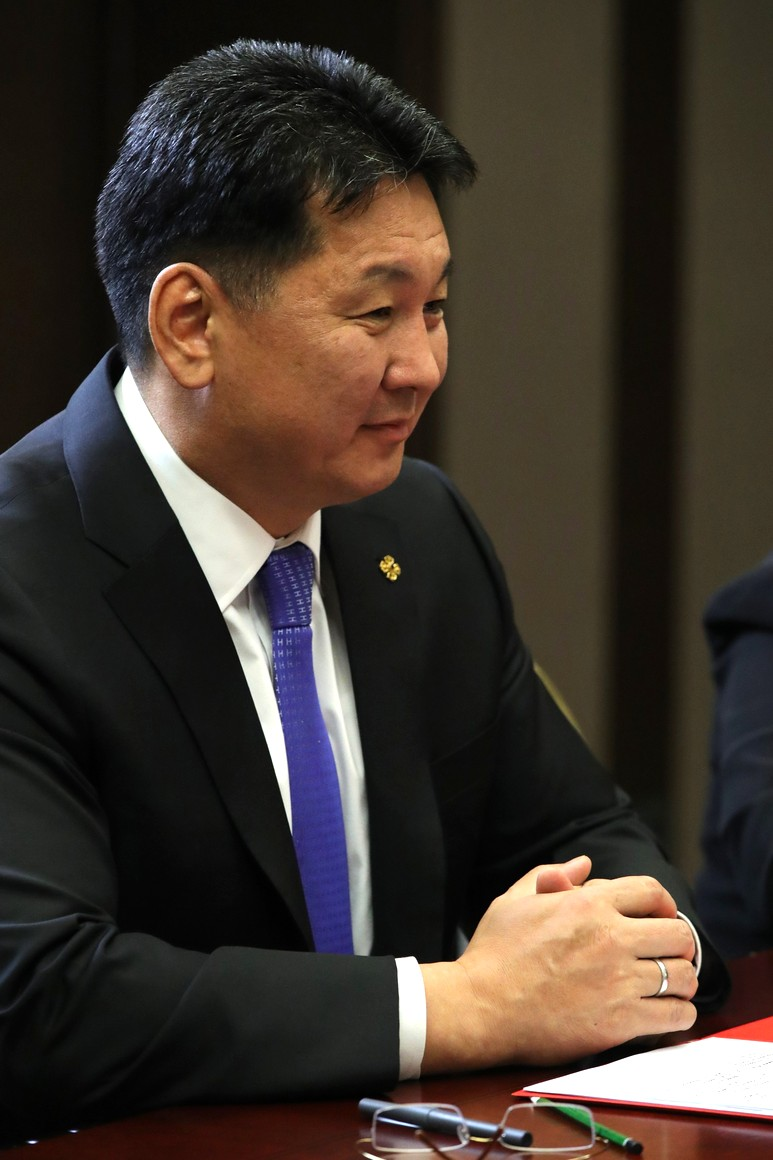
Prime minister and MPP chairman, Ukhnaagiin Khürelsükh, who would later be elected the sixth president of Mongolia in 2021.

In September 2017, prime minister Erdenebat and his cabinet were ousted (42–31) from office after a parliamentary motion. He was succeeded by deputy prime minister Khürelsükh in October 2017.

=== 2018-2019 protests and crisis ===
In late December 2018, a series of mass demonstrations occurred in Ulaanbaatar. The protest came after the unravelling of a landmark 2018 SME loan scandal, in which 14 parliamentarians, 2 cabinet ministers, 1 deputy minister and several high officials were involved, amidst a stagnating economy and quality of life. The main phase of the anti-government protests occurred between 27 December 2018 and 10 January 2019. The protestors called for the resignation of speaker Miyeegombyn Enkhbold, who was in an unresolved 2016 corruption case and believed to be heading a duopoly between the MPP and DP.

The mass protests coincited with a major factional infighting within the governing MPP and subsequent political gridlock since November 2018. A series of political manuevers led to a failed motion of no confidence in November, a proposed dissolution of parliament, and dismissal of MPP caucus leader Damdiny Khayankhyarvaa and MPP mayor of Ulaanbaatar Sunduin Batbold in December. In the aftermath of the protests, Enkhbold was dismissed by the State Great Khural on 29 January 2019, forcing him to retire from politics. He was succeeded by Gombojavyn Zandanshatar on 1 February 2019.

=== 2019 constitutional crisis and amendments ===
Anti-corruption initiatives by the government intensified in the following months. A legislation allowing president Battulga to dismiss corrupt judges based on the suggestions of the National Security Council, a non-constitutional body chaired by the president, was passed by parliament in March 2019. Several justices, prosecutors and anti-corruption chiefs were dismissed by the president in March and June. Subsequently, the country was plunged into a constitutional crisis.

Later in November, the debate came to end with amendments to the Constitution of Mongolia, which empowered the prime minister and judicial independence with reduced presidential oversight powers. The presidential term, originally a single renewable four-year term, was limited to a non-renewable term of six years. Incumbent president Battulga was consequently barred from a second term.

== 2020s ==
=== COVID-19 pandemic ===
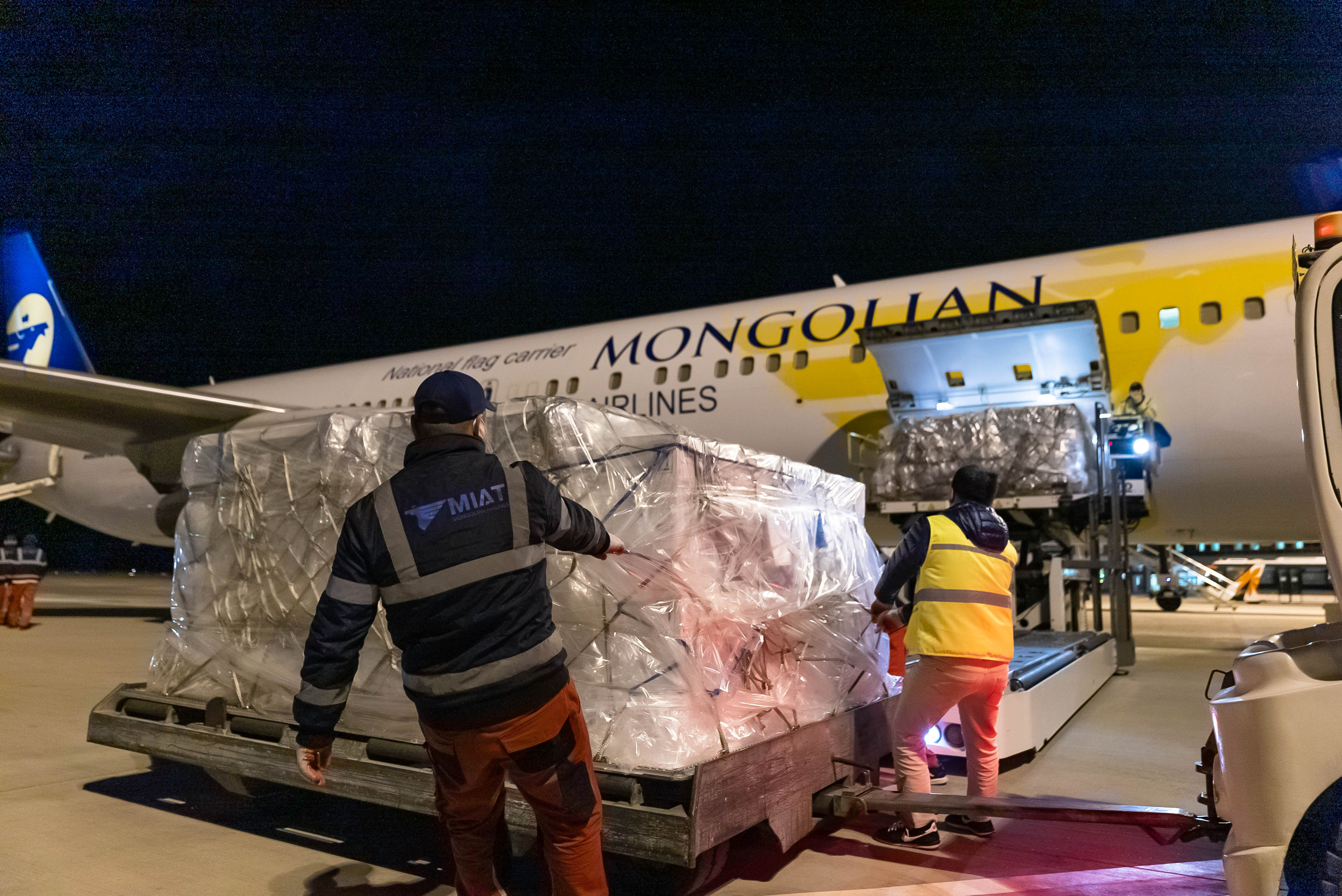
U.S. COVID-19 vaccine doses being delivered to Mongolia, 6 October 2021

On 27 January 2020, the Government of Mongolia closed its border with China and all schools following the WHO reports on coronavirus. Multiple holidays, including Tsagaan Sar and Naadam, were cancelled by the government. The COVID-19 pandemic was confirmed to have reached the country when its first case was identified in a French man who traveled from Moscow to Dornogovi on 10 March 2020. From March to November, much of Mongolia's confirmed COVID-19 cases were imported. The country's first case of community transmission was announced on 11 November. Multiple lockdowns were issued by the government in the following months.

During the pandemic, the MPP won yet another landslide victory in the 2020 parliamentary election. However, before the 2020 election, the ruling party had redrawn the electoral map in a way beneficial to MPP. In January 2021, MPP chairman and prime minister Ukhnaagiin Khürelsükh, in office since 2017, resigned after COVID-19 protests over the treatment of a coronavirus patient. His shock resignation led many analysts to believe that he was bidding for the presidency. Luvsannamsrain Oyun-Erdene (MPP) became the new prime minister on 27 January 2021. Born in 1980, he represented a younger generation of politicians who had studied abroad. The MPRP strategically merged into the MPP during the 100th anniversary of the MPP in April 2021, officially ending its decade-long existence and allowing a new third-party to enter the political scene. The centrist National Labour Party (NLP), with one seat in the State Great Khural, became the primary third-party voice in politics.

In the 2021 presidential election, former PM and MPP candidate Khürelsükh became the country's sixth democratically elected president with a landslide victory. In an electoral upset, the DP nominee and chairman, Sodnomzunduin Erdene, came last out of the three candidates, with 6% of the vote. Dangaasürengiin Enkhbat, running from the Right Person Electorate Coalition, received 21% of the vote which came mostly from Mongolian expats and youth.

On 20 June 2021, Mongolia overtook China in terms of the total COVID-19 cases, becoming the third most affected country in East Asia. Three days later, on 23 June, the amount of COVID-19 cases in the country crossed the 100,000 mark. On 26 August, the number of COVID-19 cases in Mongolia crossed the 200,000 mark. On 13 January 2022, COVID-19 cases in Mongolia crossed the 400,000 mark.

=== Post-COVID Mongolia ===
In December 2022, mass protests began in Ulaanbaatar after reports of a corruption scandal involving coal theft emerged. According to unofficial data, about 6.5 million tons of coal were allegedly stolen from Mongolia and exported to China. Protestors called for accountability, punishment of corrupt officials, and broader legal anti-corruption reform. A failed storming of the Government Palace on the second day of protests led to the injury of 13 policemen and internal troops in a stampede. The government met with the protestors and promised to investigate the affair. A parliamentary working group was formed and held a public hearing on 21 December 2022. Several officers and businessmen related to the theft were arrested and a special regime for Mongolia's state-owned Erdenes Tavantolgoy mining company was introduced.

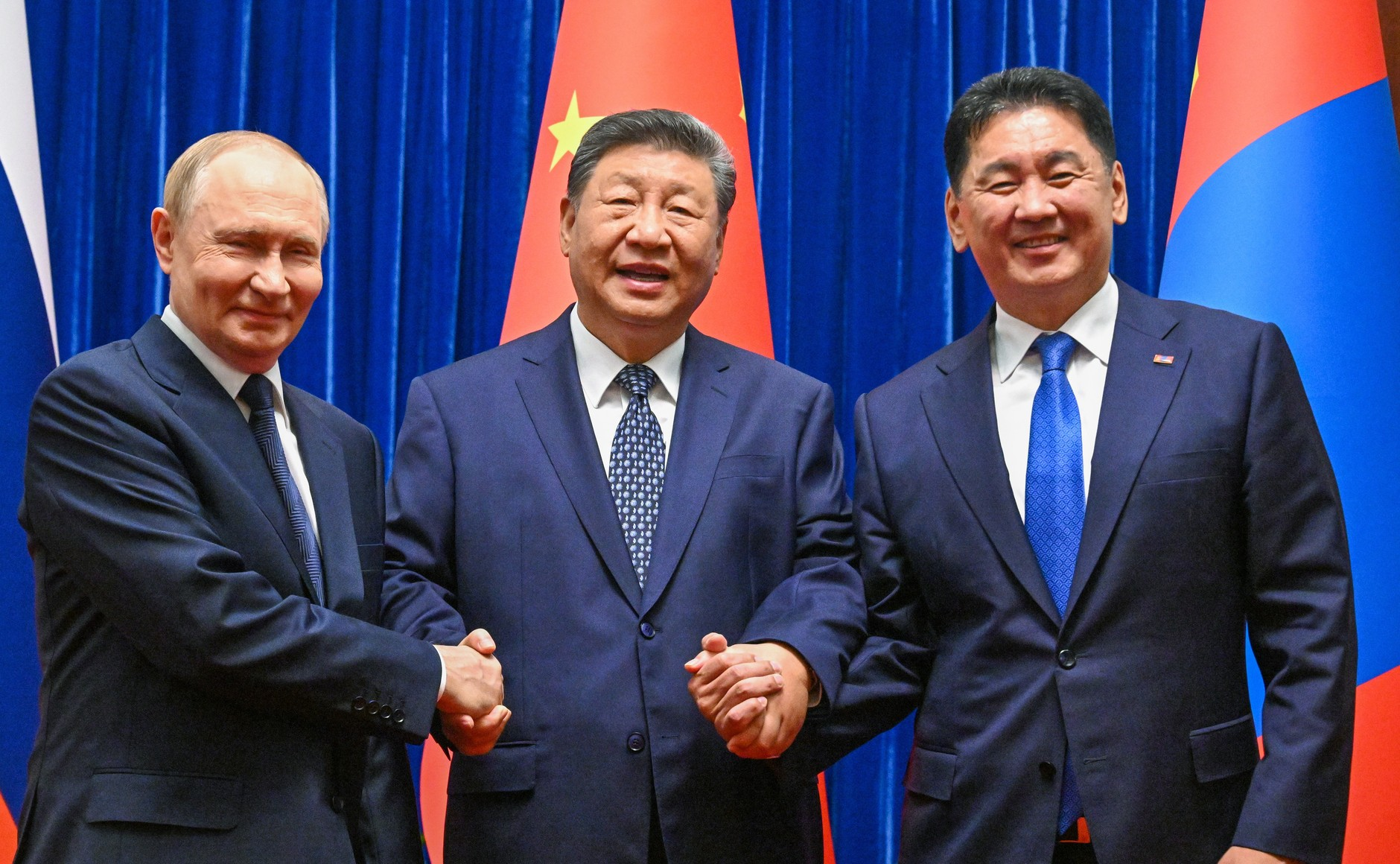
President Ukhnaagiin Khürelsükh with Vladimir Putin and Xi Jinping during the seventh meeting of heads of state of China, Russia, and Mongolia in 2025

In 2022 and 2023, a series of constitutional amendments were made to the Mongolian constitution by the State Great Khural. On 31 May 2023, the parliament voted to expand the State Great Khural from 76 to 126 seats. Later in December, political parties reached a consensus to redraw Mongolia's electoral districts; the amount of constituencies decreased from 29 to 13.

In the 2024 parliamentary election, the MPP won 68 of the 126 seats and 35% of the proportional party vote, gaining only 6 seats. In contrast, the amount of seats won by the opposition DP and the HUN Party (former NLP) increased by 31 and 7. The National Coalition and the Civil Will–Green Party also gained parliamentary representation with 4 seats respectively. Incumbent Oyun-Erdene was re-appointed as prime minister by the expanded parliament and subsequently formed a coalition government, led by the MPP, with the DP and the HUN.

=== 2025 youth-led protests ===
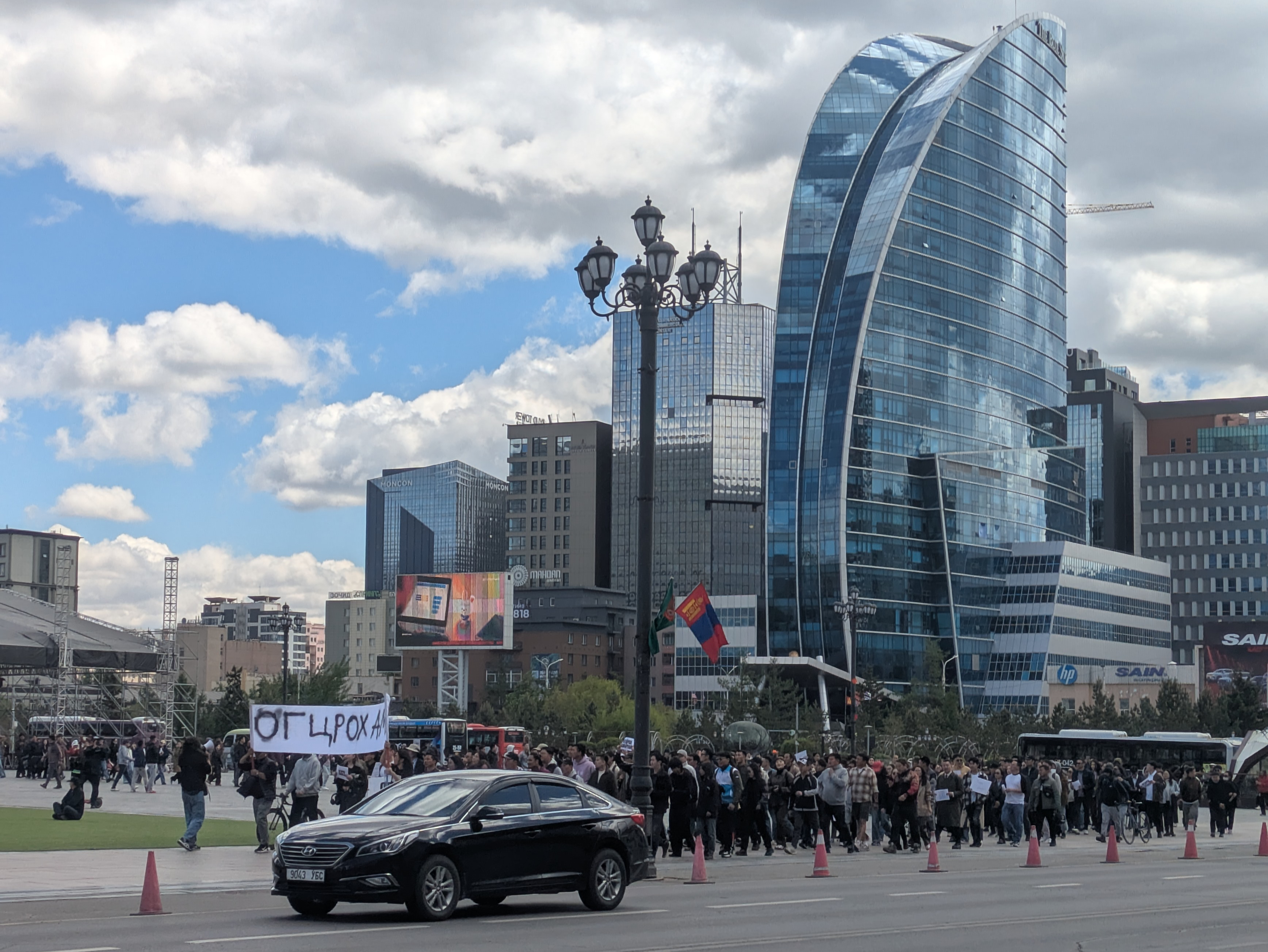
Protesters at Sükhbaatar Square on 2 June, a day before Oyun-Erdene's motion of no confidence and resignation

On 14 May 2025, anti-government demonstrations began in Ulaanbaatar, following reports of extravagant spending by the son of prime minister Oyun-Erdene. The protests, primarily led by young Mongolians, centered on broader concerns about government corruption, inequality, and the influence of political elites and their families. Oyun-Erdene denied wrongdoing and stated he would resign if any financial irregularities were found. The protests continued for over two weeks, prompting a realignment within the governing coalition and an eventual vote of no confidence.

On 3 June, Oyun-Erdene resigned as prime minister after losing a vote of confidence in the State Great Khural, receiving support from only 44 members of parliament, 20 short of the 64 required. Prior to his resignation, Oyun-Erdene provoked powerful business and mining interests for his efforts in establishing a sovereign wealth fund, similar to that of Norway. Analysts described the events as reflecting deeper political divisions, including internal tensions within the ruling MPP. Since 2024, the MPP had an emerging factional divide between conservative members born in the 1970s and reformist members born in the 1980s.

=== 2025 political crisis ===
MPP prime ministers of Mongolia since 2024

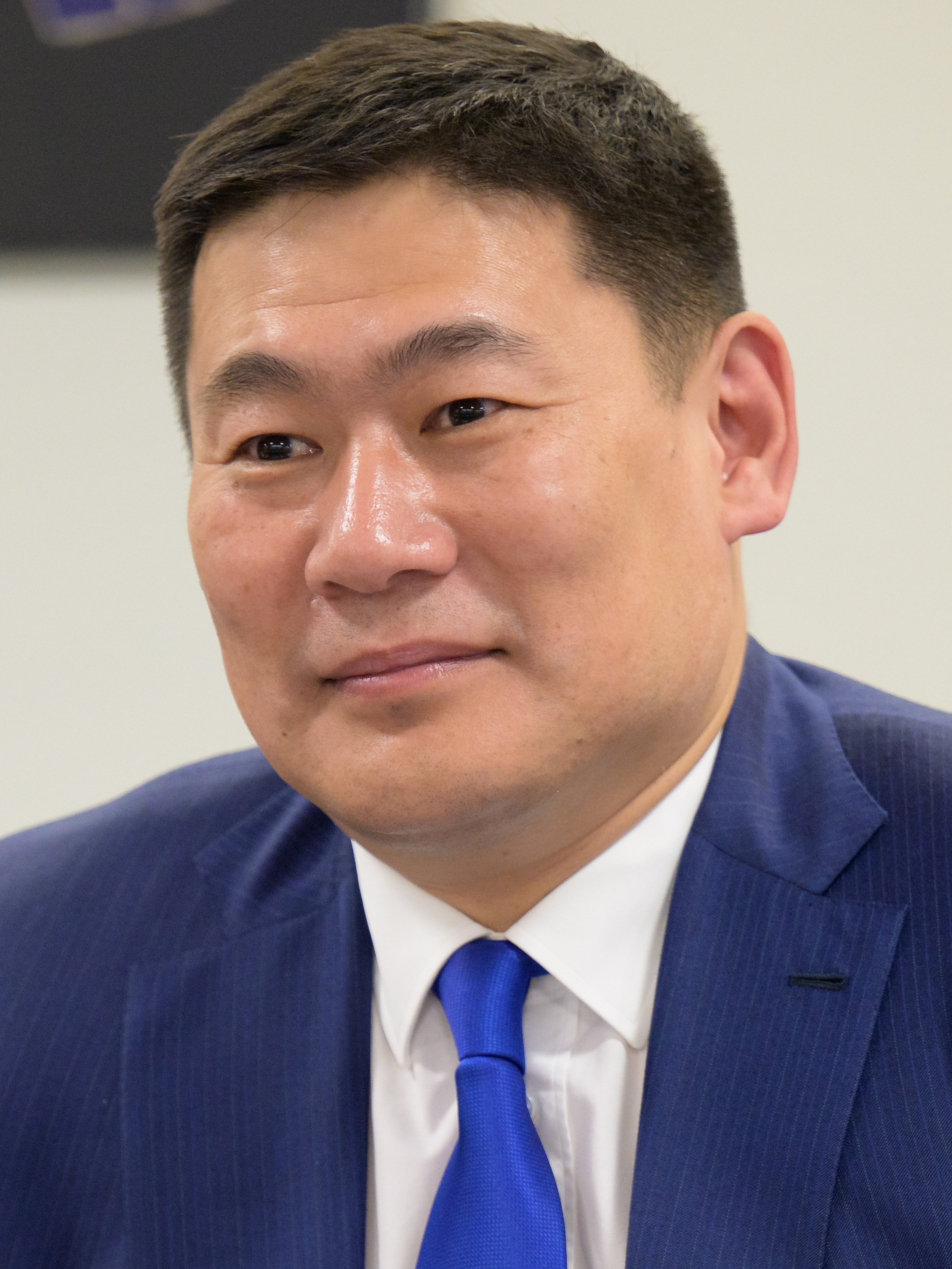
Luvsannamsrain Oyun-Erdene
(2021–2025)

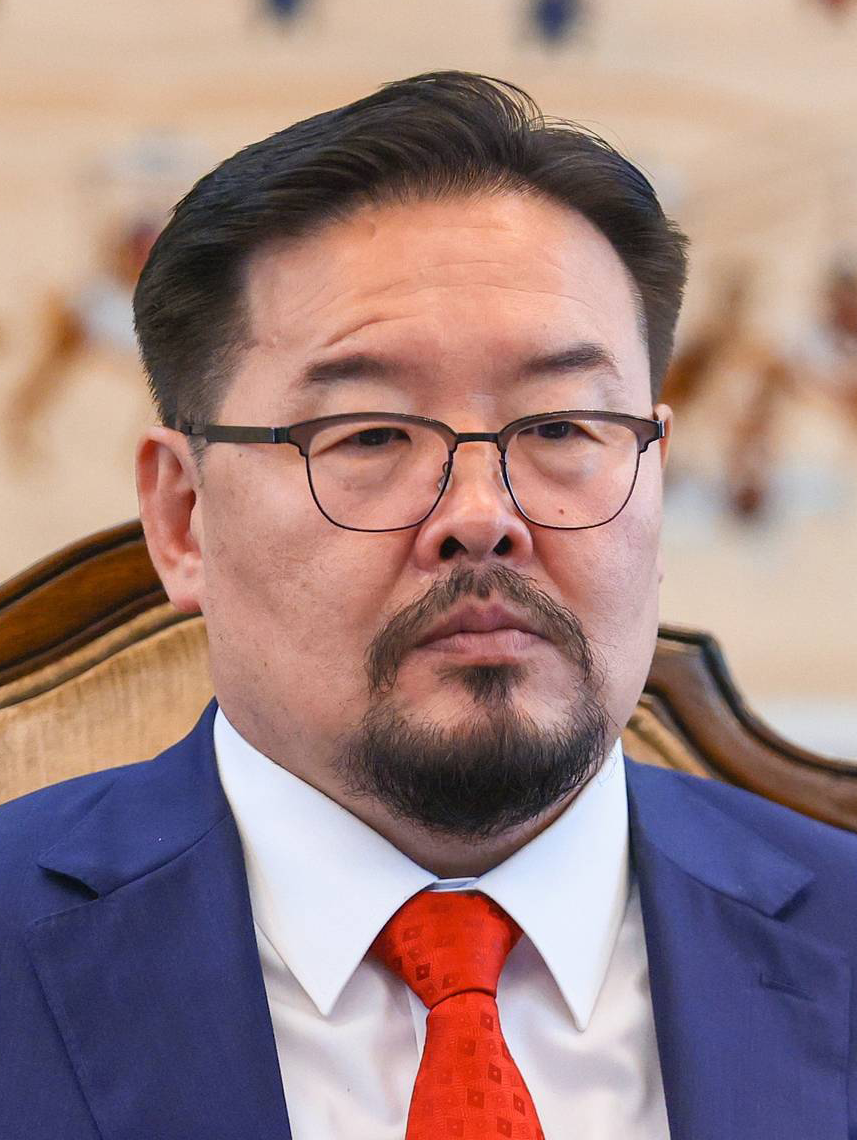
Gombojavyn Zandanshatar
(2025–2026)

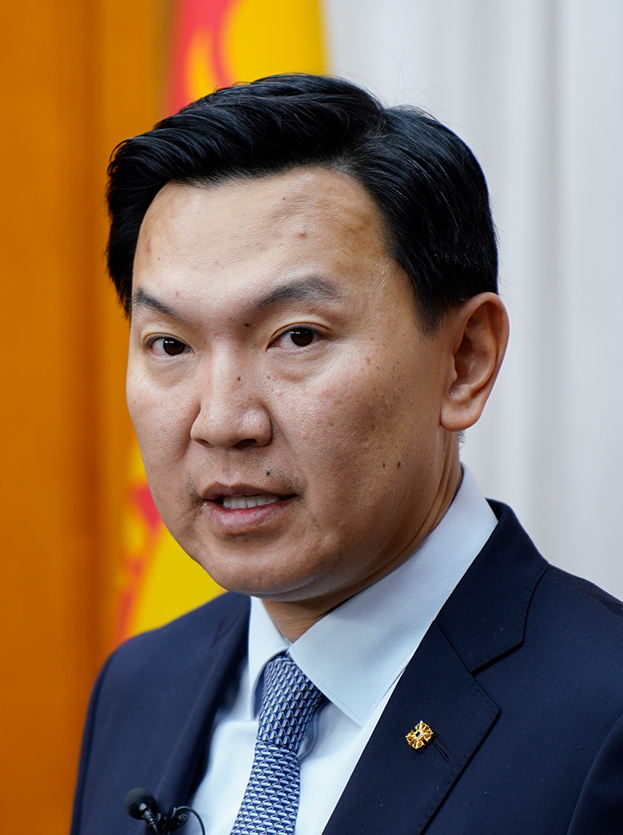
Nyam-Osoryn Uchral
(since 2026)

Former parliamentary speaker, Gombojavyn Zandanshatar, was nominated as the next prime minister by President Khürelsükh on 10 June. He was subsequently appointed by the State Great Khural on 13 June. However, a successor to Oyun-Erdene as the next MPP chairperson would not be named until the party's September conference. According to the party charter, the party chairman is designated to assume the role of prime minister when possible. Then-speaker Dashzegviin Amarbayasgalan, with the support of several allied MPP officials and MPs, came to increasingly challenge Zandanshatar's tenure in the months leading up to the Party Congress in September.

Tensions between the two camps reached its height during the MPP Congress on 27-28 September. Amarbayasgalan, a long-term ally of Oyun-Erdene, and PM Zandanshatar, a long-term ally of Khürelsükh, both ran for the chairmanship elections. Both sides contested the election results, ultimately leading to a leadership battle and political crisis that lasted 1 month and 15 days. The crisis came to an end on November 11, when Nyam-Osoryn Uchral, the First Deputy Prime Minister of Mongolia, was overwhelmingly voted in as the next party chairman. He officially succeeded Oyun-Erdene on November 15 and was sworn in to the month-long vacant speaker's office on November 20. The election of MPP leader Uchral to the speaker's office later led to a parliamentary boycott by the DP starting in March 2026. During the second week of parliamentary gridlock, prime minister Zandanshatar, with a weak political mandate, resigned on 27 March 2026 and was succeeded by Uchral three days later.

== See also ==
- Timeline of Mongolian history
- Government of Mongolia
- Politics of Mongolia
- Elections in Mongolia
- Economic history of Mongolia
