= Shagdarjavyn Natsagdorj =

Mongolian historian (1918–2001)

- Шагдаржавын Нацагдорж
- Born: 1918; Amgalanbaatar, Outer Mongolia, Republic of China
- Died: 2001 (aged 82–83)
- Siglum: Sh. Natsagdorj
- Education: National University of Mongolia
- Political party: Mongolian People's Revolutionary Party
- Awards: Marshal Choibalsan State Award
- Scientific career
- Fields: History of Mongolia
- Workplaces: Institute of History, Mongolian Academy of Sciences

Shagdarjavyn Natsagdorj (Mongolian: Шагдаржавын Нацагдорж; 1918–2001) was a Mongolian academic and historian, most notable for being director of the Institute of History at the Mongolian Academy of Sciences under the Mongolian People's Republic. In this position he was pivotal in improving the field of history in Mongolia, by compiling archives, initiating scientific journals, and supervising the protection and research of important cultural sites. His 1943 biography of Damdin Sükhbaatar established his reputation at home and abroad, but thereafter he primarily wrote on early modern topics, especially Qing-era Mongolia and the struggle for Mongolian independence. Natsagdorj also contributed to popular culture, writing plays, stories, and screenplays for a general audience. After the Mongolian Revolution of 1990, he published biographies of Genghis Khan (1991) and Kublai Khan (1998).

== Biography ==
Shagdarjavyn Natsagdorj was born in 1918 in Amgalanbaatar, near the Mongolian capital of Ulaanbaatar. The revolutionary socialist policies of the Mongolian People's Republic (MPR), founded in 1924, compelled him to leave primary school in 1930; he returned to education in 1932, after an armed uprising compelled the government to adopt the New Turn Policy, a less hardline stance. In 1935, he was accepted as an apprentice in the Institute of History at the Mongolian Academy of Sciences (MAS); two years later in 1937, he was appointed the institute's director. His early work concentrated on the life of the revolutionary hero Damdin Sükhbaatar and culminated in a 1943 biography which received the first Marshal Choibalsan State Award. A decade later in 1955, Owen Lattimore and Urgunge Onon published an English translation of this work—the first translation of a biography of a revolutionary figure, it would establish Natsagdorj's reputation in the English-speaking world.

Although Natsagdorj initially wrote on both modern and pre-modern history, he increasingly came to focus on the latter. He was especially influential in reviving the study of the growth of the Mongolian independence movement, publishing works such as The national freedom movement and anti-feudal movement in Khalkh Mongolia (1941). As an academic, Natsagdorj received his doctorate in 1954 from the National University of Mongolia; his dissertation discussed "the Arat liberation movement in the Khobdos region of Outer Mongolia under the leadership of Ayushi". In 1961, he was officially awarded the title of Academician, and he received his habilitation in 1973. Lattimore praised Natsagdorj's History of Khalka (1963) as "stand[ing] alone in the world of scholarship" on account of its exhaustive cross-comparison of decrees, orders, reports, and other documents in order to resolve historical disrepancies.

In his official capacities, Natsagdorj worked to improve the resources and opportunities available to Mongolian historians. He established archives of original historical documents and made a number available for public consumption at the National Library of Mongolia, while also helping to initiate journals on history, ethnography, and archaeology, and while supervising the research, protection, and restoration of cultural sites such as the Erdene Zuu monastery near Karakorum. His pioneer work on archiving the bureaucratic minutiae of Qing-era Mongolia met with an eager welcome from Western scholars. Natsagdorj also made contributions to Mongolian literature, becoming the chairman of the Mongolian Writers' Committee, in which capacity he strengthened the writers' union and encouraged the exploration of works motivated by artistic merit, even when this went against strict ideological conformity. He himself wrote short stories from 1944 onwards, releasing a collection in 1966, in addition to novels such as Crystal Mirror and Mandukhai Seten Khatan; the latter, about the life of the fifteenth-century queen Mandukhai, was the basis of the popular 1988 film Queen Mandukhai the Wise. He even authored theatrical plays and screenplays, including Khongorzul and The Epic of the Gobi.

Natsagdorj's international colleague Igor de Rachewiltz noted that he risked the ire of the communist government, who appointed him a State Great Khural deputy in the 1951 election, by not sticking to official positions on historical events. For instance, he was censured for failing to appropriately criticise Genghis Khan in the foreword he wrote for Tsendiin Damdinsüren's 1947 translation of the Secret History of the Mongols. In 1957, he was appointed to write the chapters on the Mongol Empire for the second edition of the National History of Mongolia; the first edition, published two years previously, had been written by Soviet scholars and was extremely prejudiced against Genghis Khan and his empire. Natsagdorj substantially neutralised the overt bias and subtly contradicted the arguments of prominent Soviet scholar Ilya Petruchevsky, who had written the same chapters of the first edition. He also played a significant role in the 1962 Genghis Khan controversy, which arose when an Ulaanbaatar academic conference offered a primarily positive view of Genghis Khan. Natsagdorj was the second speaker, and concluded his remarks with the words "Genghis has been remembered as a figure of merit as the founder of the independent Mongolian nation." The MPR's leader Yumjaagiin Tsedenbal took the chance to purge those behind what the Soviet Union immediately condemned as "Mongolian nationalism", including his main rival Daramyn Tömör-Ochir. The academics, including Natsagdorj, were fiercely criticized in the Mongolian state press. The controversy spiralled and, after Chinese historians intervened, exacerbated the Sino-Soviet split.

A year after the Mongolian Revolution of 1990, Natsagdorj published the book Ruling Principles of Genghis Khan, edited by his colleague and fellow Academician Shagdaryn Bira, which offered original arguments. In 1998, he published a book on Genghis's grandson Kublai Khan which concluded that no ruler in world history surpassed Kublai in terms of power and influence. Natsagdorj died in 2001. He was survived by his daughter, N. Ariungua. In a 2008 speech at a conference celebrating the 90th anniversary of Natsagdorj's birth, Ts. Ishdorj, a Mongolian historian and director of the Mongolian Studies Union, praised him as "the backbone of modern Mongolian historical science".
