= 1962 Genghis Khan controversy =

Controversy over the birth of Genghis Khan

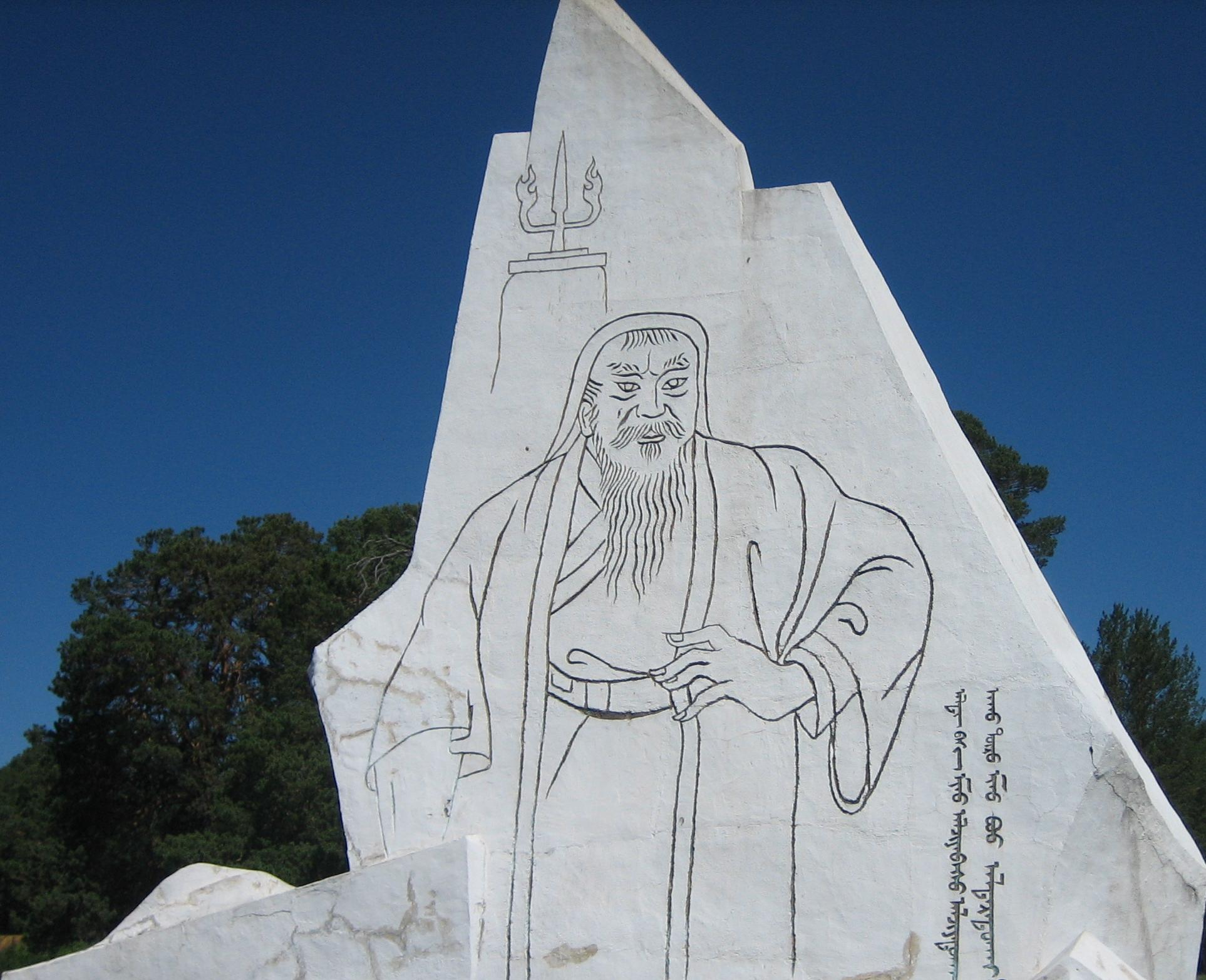
The monument erected in honour of Genghis Khan at Dadal, Khentii Province

A controversy surrounding the 800th anniversary of the birth of Genghis Khan arose in 1962 in the Mongolian People's Republic (MPR). In the early 20th century, Genghis had become closely associated with the nascent movement of Mongolian nationalism, but he was vilified under the MPR because of the regime's communist ideology. During a less oppressive period in the early 1960s, Mongolian academics obtained permission to celebrate the 800th anniversary of Genghis's birth in 1162. After large preparations, the events started with a small academic conference where leading historians including Shagdarjavyn Natsagdorj and Tsendiin Damdinsüren gave rather favourable assessments of Genghis Khan and the Mongols. This was sharply criticised by Soviet historians and newspapers, and the event's proponent Daramyn Tömör-Ochir was purged from the Mongolian government in retribution.

== Background ==
A portrait of Genghis Khan, around whose birth anniversary the controversy revolved

In the 13th century, Genghis Khan founded the Mongol Empire, which conquered huge areas of Eurasia and became the largest land empire in history. The empire split into successor states which themselves diminished over time. In the Mongolian heartlands from the 16th century onwards, Genghis was perceived as a religious figure, as Tibetan Buddhism incorporated him into its divine pantheon and his wars into its cosmology. With the rise of Mongolian nationalism in the early 20th century, this folkloric legend was forgotten in favour of extolling a political unifier and conqueror of worldwide renown—in other words, the national hero of the new Mongolian state.

After the 1924 formation of the Mongolian People's Republic, a satellite state of the Soviet Union, communist ideology demanded that Genghis be interpreted as a tyrannical feudal oppressor. Writers who favoured Mongolian nationalism and portrayed him positively were punished. For example, A Brief History of Mongolia (1934) was confiscated after its initial publication, and its writer, the prime minister Anandyn Amar, was soon after exiled and executed in the USSR. Instead of medieval Mongol figures, the Soviets promoted Damdin Sükhbaatar, a commander of the Mongolian Revolution of 1921, the politician Khorloogiin Choibalsan, and his patron Joseph Stalin, as national heroes. After the Second World War, in line with a broader Soviet trend of minimising heroes of minority groups, criticism of Genghis and the Mongol Empire intensified. The first edition of the National History of Mongolia, published in 1954 after Stalin's death, denounced the "feudal exploitation and subjugation" of the Mongols' "robbery campaigns".

Genghis remained hugely popular among the general populace, and although works of fiction and non-fiction about the Mongols had to toe the party line, they regularly became bestsellers. Foreign powers often attempted to gain Mongolian support through patronising Genghis's memory: for example, when the Japanese were campaigning in Inner Mongolia in the 1930s, they supported the construction of a large temple to him. Meanwhile, the Chinese Nationalists protected the ritual objects of the Genghis cult through World War Two, and their communist successors returned them with great ceremony in 1954. Soviet and Chinese views on Genghis increasingly diverged, and Chinese scholars withdrew from the second edition of the National History, which nevertheless was much less harsh towards the Mongols.

== Preparations ==
Although the year of birth of Genghis Khan is disputed, 1162 is the most widely-accepted among scholars. Mongolian academics desired to celebrate the 800th anniversary in 1962, but were concerned that any event would be viewed as excessively nationalistic. However, after students in China learnt in late 1961 that celebrations were planned in that country, the Institute of History of the Mongolian Academy of Sciences (MAS) began making plans. D. Tsedev, the director of the Institute of History, applied for permission for a festival on 8 January 1962, and the matter was brought up by Daramyn Tömör-Ochir in the Mongolian People's Party (MPP)'s Central Committee Politburo on 8 February. Tömör-Ochir's proposal was approved and the date of the festival set for 10 June. On a visit to Moscow, the historian Shagdaryn Bira found that most Soviet historians criticised the proposal.

The celebration's organising committee first convened on March 28. Its first resolution was the production of a documentary film on Genghis Khan, distributed internationally with subtitles in Western languages. It also decided to issue commemorative stamps, and to erect an 11-metre (36 ft) high stone monument at Genghis's presumed birthplace at Dadal in Khentii Province. Built by a sculptor named L. Makhbal, it was unveiled at 10:00 on 3 July. One issue was the date of Genghis's birth, unrecorded in any sources—the organisers asked the Buddhist monks at the Gandantegchinlen Monastery to divine the date through astrology, and they fixed upon 06:00 on 31 May 1162.

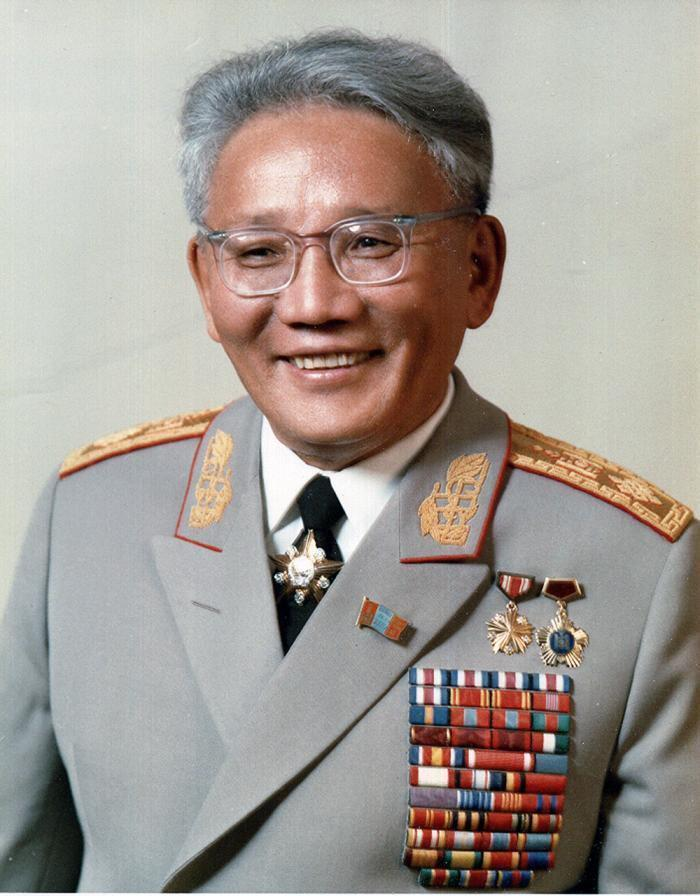
Yumjaagiin Tsedenbal, Mongolia's general secretary, pictured in the 1970s

When the leading academic Shagdarjavyn Natsagdorj discussed his initial draft of his opening speech, it was decided to favour Genghis's positive contributions and minimise his negative ones. When the final draft was discussed on 22nd May by the members of the Politburo, the general secretary Yumjaagiin Tsedenbal warned against deemphasising Genghis's destructive acts:

No doubt [Genghis] was a great political figure of Mongolia, a capable leader and a founder of the Mongolian Unified State, but we shouldn't forget about his vicious activities. We should not forget that he caused hardships for people and destroyed human civilization. You should pay special attention to this in the article.

On 29 May, a last-minute telegram was received from Moscow, containing an article by the geographer I. M. Maiskii criticising Genghis Khan—an obvious warning from the Soviet authorities. The programme nevertheless went ahead.

== Controversy ==
An academic conference for the anniversary was held at the National Library on May 31st. After opening remarks from the president of MAS, Natsagdorj's speech described Genghis as "wise, daring, an excellent organizer and leader, and an impressive military commander". He, according to the historian Ippei Shimamura, cleverly acknowledged Soviet ideology by quoting Boris Vladimirtsov, but nevertheless gave a favourable assessment of Genghis. This line of thought was continued by the following speakers, including Bira, N. Ishjamts, H. Perlee, and Tsendiin Damdinsüren, who criticised several Russian historians for their negative interpretations on the Mongols. The nationalist tone of the conference met with immediate backlash. The Soviet Embassy in Ulaanbaatar alleged that Natsagdorj had claimed that Mongolia was admitted to the United Nations because of Genghis, not because of Soviet support; Natsagdorj stated that he said no such thing and that his remarks had been misinterpreted. The embassy also strongly criticised Damdinsüren's remarks on Russian academics.

Spurred by a sharply critical article in Pravda, the official newspaper of the Communist Party of the Soviet Union, which was published on 21 July, the Mongolian Politburo had turned against the celebrations by August. The commemorative stamps, which cost ₮1.1 million, were barred from distribution or sold to capitalist countries on 2 August. Responsibility fell on Tömör-Ochir, and Tsedenbal saw an opportunity to purge his biggest rival. On 10 September, Tsedenbal criticised Tömör-Ochir as "excessively nationalistic" and "pro-Chinese", and soon expelled his rival from the MPP. Tsedenbal also publicly criticised Natsagdorj and Damdinsüren, and demoted the latter from a director at MAS to a rank-and-file position. The organisers of the events were called to self-criticise their actions. The documentary film was cancelled and the materials from the conference were banned from publication. Tsedenbal even gave the order to demolish the monument, but the local administrator who had unveiled it argued that that would damage a nearby inn.

The controversy became a minor issue during the Sino-Soviet split of the 1960s, as Soviet historians criticised their Chinese counterparts for their more favourable views on the Mongols. The Mongolian scholarly position on Genghis Khan was forced to reverse course after the events of 1962—the third edition of the National History (1981) was similar in tone to the first and not the second. Meanwhile, the Mongolian people retained an intense interest in Genghis Khan. A poem titled Chinggis, written by a Mongolian student in Moscow, was banned soon after its 1962 publication because of its nationalist undertones, but it was nevertheless immensely popular. It was only unbanned 28 years later during Mongolia's transition from communism, as the newly-democratic country resumed its veneration of Genghis Khan.
