= National symbols of Mongolia =

The national symbols of Mongolia are official and unofficial flags, icons or cultural expressions that are emblematic, representative or otherwise characteristic of Mongolia and of its culture.

== Symbols ==
Type	Symbol	Image	Notes
Flag	Flag of Mongolia		The flag is a vertical triband with a red stripe at each side and a blue stripe in the middle, symbolizing the eternal blue sky, with a yellow Soyombo symbol.
Emblem	Emblem of Mongolia		The state emblem was adopted in 1992 after the ratification of a new constitution. The emblem features the Wind Horse, the Soyombo symbol, and the Chandmani.
National anthem	Mongol Ulsyn töriin duulal ᠮᠣᠩᠭᠣᠯ ᠤᠯᠤᠰ ᠤ᠋ᠨ ᠲᠥᠷᠦ ᠶ᠋ᠢᠨ ᠳᠠᠭᠤᠯᠠᠯ		The national anthem was created and composed in 1950. Its lyrics were changed in 1961, 1991 and in 2006.
State seal	State seal of Mongolia		The state seal is stamped on important government documents and international agreements. The seal was adopted in 1992 and is held by the President of Mongolia.
National symbol	Soyombo symbol ᠰᠣᠶᠤᠮᠪᠤ		The Soyombo is a special character in the Soyombo script.created by Mongolian Buddhist spiritual leader Zanabazar in 1686.
National currency	Mongolian tögrög		The Mongolian tögrög or tugrik was introduced in 1925.
National flower	Ber tsetseg (Scabiosa comosa)		The Ber tsetseg was announced the national flora of pride in 2014.
National animal	Takhi (Equus ferus przewalskii)		The Takhi is the national animal of Mongolia, It is recognized as the true wild horse of the steppes and symbolizes freedom, endurance, and the traditional nomadic heritage of Mongolia.
National bird	Saker falcon (Falco cherrug)		The saker falcon was named as the national bird of Mongolia by the Government of Mongolia in 2012.
National pride animal	Mazaalai (Ursus arctos gobiensis)		The Mazaalai was declared as national pride animal by the Government of Mongolia in 2023.
National dish	Buuz		Buuz is widely considered to be the national dish of Mongolia.
