= Round Table Talks =

The Round Table Talks were a series of negotiations that took place in several countries of the Eastern Bloc between Communists and the opposition. They were a key component in the collapse of the Communist regimes and the smooth transition to democracy.

- The Polish Round Table Talks, February-April 1989
- The Hungarian Round Table Talks, March-September 1989
- The Czechoslovak Round Table Talks, November-December 1989
- The East German Round Table Talks, December 1989-March 1990
- The Bulgarian Round Table Talks, January-May 1990

Also:

- The Congolese Round Table Talks, 1960
