= Mongolian nationalism =

Mongolian nationalism may refer to:

- Historical Mongolian nationalism that led to the Mongolian Revolution of 1911 against the Qing Empire
- Historical Mongolian nationalism that led to the Mongolian Revolution of 1921 against the Chinese Republic
- 1945 Mongolian independence referendum
- Present-day Mongolian nationalism better known as Pan-Mongolism

== See also ==
- History of Mongolia
