= Ard Ayush =

Mongolian People's Republic politician (1858–1939)

Ard Ayush (Mongolian: Ард Аюуш, full name: Алдаржавын Аюуш (tr. Aldarjaviin Ayush; 1858–1939) was the leader of an Arat rebellion in southwestern Khovd Province from 1903 until 1917.

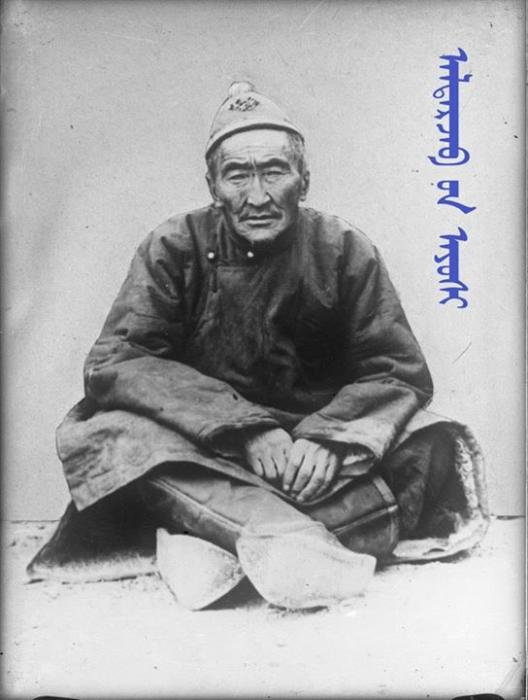
Ard Ayush

== Biography ==
Ard Ayush was born in 1858 in Darhan Beile banner, Zasagt Khan aimag (now Tsetseg sum, Khovd aimag) as a tributary of banner khan Manibazar. In 1903 he led the protest of Arat herdsmen and Tayijis against the injustices of the khan in regard to his tributaries. In 1911–1917 he continued resistance against the unjust khan's actions and Chinese colonial oppression. Later Ard Ayush took an active part in the People's Revolution of 1921 and became a member of the government in the Mongolian People's Republic.

== In popular culture ==
The heroism of Ard Ayush repeatedly inspired artists in Mongolia, examples include:

- «Ard Ayush» movie by B. Sonom
- «Ard Ayush» opera by B. Baasanjav
