= State seal of Mongolia =

State Seal of Mongolia Монгол Улсын төрийн тамга
- Armiger: Ukhnaagiin Khürelsükh, President of Mongolia
- Adopted: 1992
- Motto: Монгол Улс ('Mongol Nation') ᠮᠤᠩᠭᠤᠯ ᠤᠯᠤᠰ

The state seal of Mongolia (Note: Mongolian: Монгол Улсын төрийн тамга, romanized: Mongol Ulsiin töriin tamga, pronounced [mɔ́ɴɢɞɬ ʊɬsíɴ tʰɵríɴ tʰáməq]) is one of the national symbols of Mongolia and is used as the official seal of state, with President of Mongolia as its holder. The state seal is affixed on each page of the original text of the Constitution of Mongolia, on the first page of the original text of Mongol laws, international agreements ratified by the State Great Khural, and State Great Khural decisions on establishing or terminating diplomatic relations between Mongolia and foreign countries. During presidential inauguration ceremonies, the outgoing president hands over the state seal to the newly elected president.

== Description ==
The state seal is square with a lion-shaped handle with the state emblem in the center. The seal was made by hand of pure silver. It measures 10.0 x 10.0 x 2.0 cm, and the height of the lion-shaped handle is 8.0 cm. On the four corners of the seal, there is a tümen nasan symbol of strength, and the inscription Mongol Uls ('Mongolia') is written in folded Mongolian script. The seal is stored in a sandalwood box decorated with silver ornaments of national motifs and lined with silk fabric.

== See also ==
- National seals of Japan
- Seal of South Korea
- Imperial Seal of China
- National Seals of the Republic of China
- Seal of the State Council of the People's Republic of China
