= Shagdaryn Bira =

Mongolian historian (1927–2022)

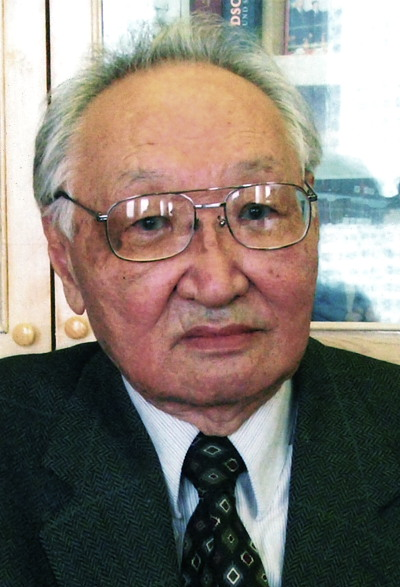
Shagdaryn Bira

Shagdaryn Bira (September 1927 – 13 February 2022) was a Mongolian historian and scholar noted for his research that examines the history, culture, religion, and languages of the Mongols. This research covers a wide area from ancient ties between Mongolia, India and Tibet to Genghis Khan's Mongolian Empire to Mongolian communism in the 20th century.

== Career ==
From 1987, he served as the General Secretary for the International Association for Mongol Studies and worked as a visiting professor at universities and research institutes in several countries, including Russia, France, India, and Japan. He wrote books, including the Mongolian Historiography in the 13th-17th Centuries, and contributed various chapters/volumes to UNESCO's History of Civilizations of Central Asia.

Bira was one of founders and honorary president of the International Fund of Tengri Research, president of the Roerich Society of Mongolia, and director of the Nicholas Roerich Museum and Shambhala Art Institute. He worked with Glenn Mullin to save the Roerich house in Mongolia and restore it as a museum and art gallery. Bira was the oldest living student of George Roerich.

In 2006 he was awarded the Fukuoka Prize. Bira died on 13 February 2022, at the age of 94.
