= Arats =

Mongolian herdsmen

The Arats (Mongolian: ард — labourer, folk) are a social ethnic community of Mongolian herdsmen. They reside in Mongolia and China. The Arats' main activity is cattle herding. Before the Revolution of 1921, the Arats composed 92.5% of Mongolia's population and possessed 50.5% of the nation's livestock. The Arats of China are considered a part of the population of Inner Mongolia, Xinjiang, and Qinghai provinces. Some peasants of the Tyva Republic in Russia are also called Arats.
