= List of members of the State Great Khural, 2012–2016 =

2012-2016 State Great Khural
←	2008–2012	2016–2020	→
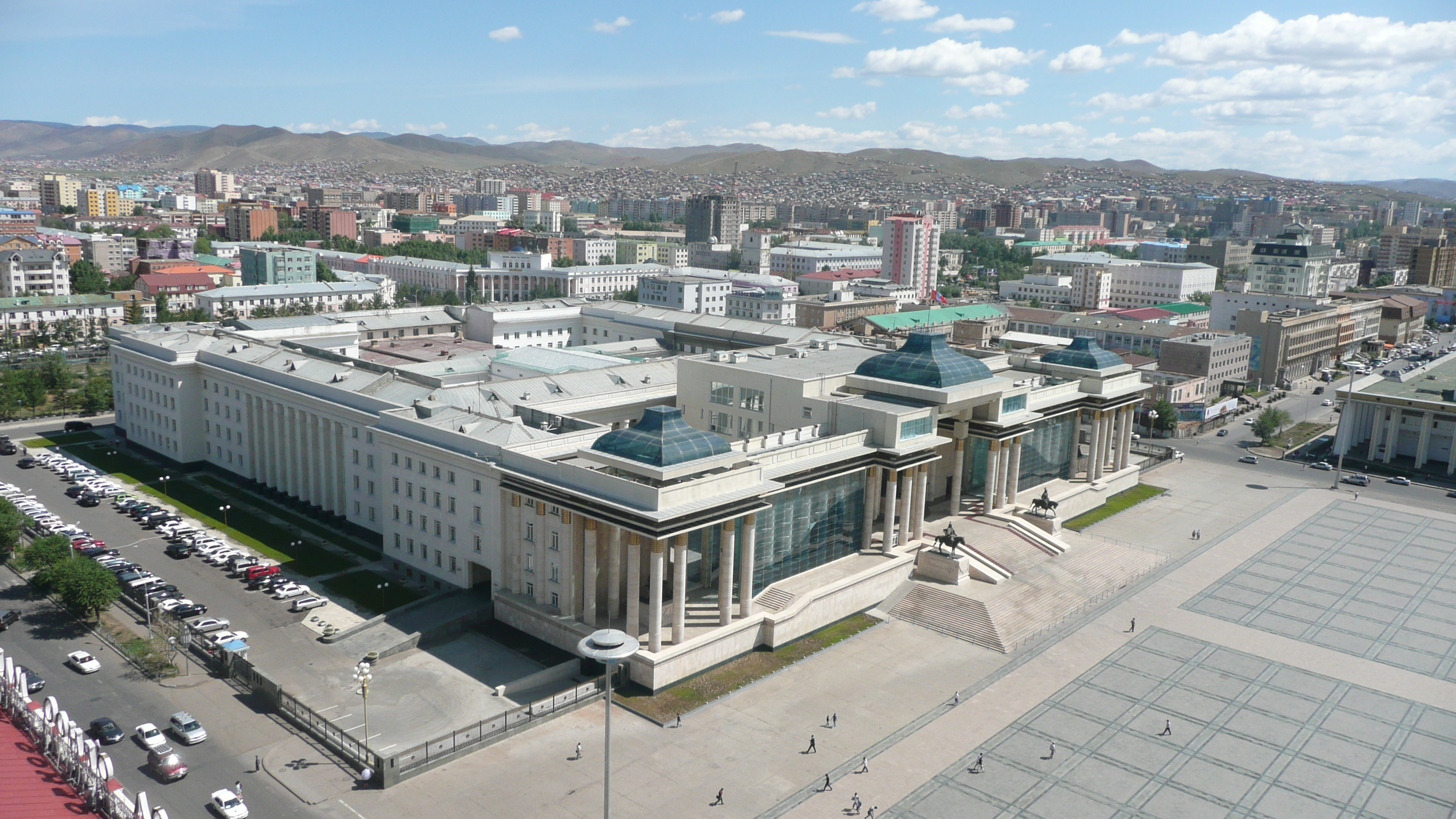
- Government Palace of Mongolia

Overview
- Legislative body: State Great Khural
- Jurisdiction: Mongolia
- Meeting place: Government Palace, Ulaanbaatar, Mongolia
- Term: 6 July 2012 – 5 July 2016
- Election: 28 June 2012
- Website: www.parliament.mn

State Great Khural
- Members: 76
- Chairman: Zandaakhüügiin Enkhbold
- Prime Minister: Sükhbaataryn Batbold (until 10 August 2012); Norovyn Altankhuyag (until 5 November 2014); Chimediin Saikhanbileg (until 2 July 2016)
- Party control: Plurality of the Democratic Party

The 2012–2016 State Great Khural was the sixth session of the State Great Khural which first convened on 6 July 2012 and remained in session until 5 July 2016. Its members were first elected in the 2012 parliamentary election held on 28 June 2012.

== Composition ==
In the 2012 parliamentary election, four political parties and three independents were elected to the State Great Khural. By June 2016, the State Great Khural comprised five parties and one independent.

Party	Original elected seats			At dissolution			Floor leader
Party	Con.	PR	Total	±	Total	%	Floor leader
Democratic Party	24	10	34	▲4	38	50.0%	Dondogdorjiin Erdenebat (2012–2014); Batkhüügiin Garamgaibaatar (2014–2016)
Mongolian People's Party	17	9	26	▲4	30	39.5%	Nyamaagiin Enkhbold (2012–2013); Sandagiin Byambatsogt (2013–2016)
Justice Coalition	4	7	11	▼7	4	5.3%	Namdagiin Battsereg (2013–2016) (Note: Caucus of the Justice Coalition abolished in May 2016 when the coalition seats fell below eight)
Independence and Unity Party	—N/a	—N/a	—N/a	▲2	2	2.6%	—N/a
Civil Will–Green Party	—N/a	2	2	▼1	1	1.3%	—N/a
Independent	3	—N/a	3	▼2	1	1.3%	—N/a
Totals	48	28	76	—	76	100.0%	

== List of members ==
=== Constituency ===
48 of the 76 seats in the State Great Khural were elected from 26 multi-member constituencies.

Constituency	Member		Party	Notes
1st Arkhangai	Nyamjavyn Batbayar	Нямжавын Батбаяр	Democratic Party	
1st Arkhangai	Bayarbaataryn Bolor	Баярбаатарын Болор	Democratic Party	
2nd Bayan-Ölgii	Almalikyn Tleikhan	Алмаликын Тлейхан	Mongolian People's Party	
2nd Bayan-Ölgii	Agilapyn Bakei	Агипарын Бакей	Democratic Party	
3rd Bayankhongor	Khaltmaagiin Battulga	Халтмаагийн Баттулга	Democratic Party	
3rd Bayankhongor	Dashdondogiin Ganbat	Дашдондогийн Ганбат	Democratic Party	
4th Bulgan	Yondongiin Otgonbayar	Ёндонгийн Отгонбаяр	Mongolian People's Party	
5th Govi-Altai	Tsedeviin Dashdorj	Цэдэвийн Дашдорж	Mongolian People's Party	
6th Govisümber, Dornogovi	Jamyansürengiin Batsuuri	Жамъянсүрэнгийн Батсуурь	Mongolian People's Party	
7th Dornod	Khayangaagiin Bolorchuluun	Хаянгаагийн Болорчулуун	~~Independent~~	
7th Dornod	Khayangaagiin Bolorchuluun	Хаянгаагийн Болорчулуун	Mongolian People's Party	
7th Dornod	Nyamtaishiryn Nomtoibayar	Нямтайширийн Номтойбаяр	Mongolian People's Party	
8th Dundgovi	Batsükhiin Narankhüü	Батсүхийн Наранхүү	Democratic Party	
9th Zavkhan	Yadamsürengiin Sanjmyatav	Ядамсүрэнгийн Санжмятав	Democratic Party	
9th Zavkhan	Dulamsürengiin Oyuunkhorol	Дуламсүрэнгийн Оюунхорол	Mongolian People's Party	
10th Övörkhangai	Gavaagiin Batkhüü	Гаваагийн Батхүү	Democratic Party	
10th Övörkhangai	Dashzevegiin Zorigt	Дашзэвэгийн Зоригт	Democratic Party	
11th Ömnögovi	Dashdembereliin Bat-Erdene	Дашдэмбэрэлийн Бат-Эрдэнэ	Democratic Party	
12th Sükhbaatar	Mönkhchuluuny Zorigt	Мөнхчулууны Зоригт	Democratic Party	
13th Selenge	Sangajavyn Bayartsogt	Сангажавын Баярцогт	Democratic Party	
13th Selenge	Jargaltulgyn Erdenebat	Жаргалтулгын Эрдэнэбат	Mongolian People's Party	
14th Töv	Miyeegombyn Enkhbold	Миеэгомбын Энхболд	Mongolian People's Party	Served as the MPP chairman from 2013 to 2017 and Deputy Chairman of the State Great Khural for the MPP Caucus
14th Töv	Sunduin Batbold	Сундуйн Батболд	Mongolian People's Party	
15th Uvs	Chimediin Khürelbaatar	Чимэдийн Хүрэлбаатар	Mongolian People's Party	
15th Uvs	Battogtokhyn Choijilsüren	Баттогтохын Чойжилсүрэн	Mongolian People's Party	
16th Khovd	Sandagiin Byambatsogt	Сандагийн Бямбацогт	Mongolian People's Party	Chairman of the MPP caucus from 2013 to 2016
16th Khovd	Dogsomyn Battsogt	Догсомын Батцогт	Justice Coalition	MNDP Member
16th Khovd	Dogsomyn Battsogt	Догсомын Батцогт	Democratic Party	Joined the DP in 2014
17th Khövsgöl	Luvsantserengiin Enkh-Amgalan	Лувсанцэрэнгийн Энх-Амгалан	Mongolian People's Party	
17th Khövsgöl	Tserenpiliin Davaasüren	Цэрэнпилийн Даваасүрэн	~~Independent~~	
17th Khövsgöl	Tserenpiliin Davaasüren	Цэрэнпилийн Даваасүрэн	Mongolian People's Party	
18th Khentii	Badmaanyambuugiin Bat-Erdene	Бадмаанямбуугийн Бат-Эрдэнэ	Mongolian People's Party	
18th Khentii	Batkhüügiin Garamgaibaatar	Батхүүгийн Гарамгайбаатар	Democratic Party	Chairman of the DP caucus from 2014 to 2016
19th Darkhan-Uul	Sainkhüügiin Ganbaatar	Сайнхүүгийн Ганбаатар	~~Independent~~	
19th Darkhan-Uul	Sainkhüügiin Ganbaatar	Сайнхүүгийн Ганбаатар	National Labour Party	Briefly became a member and chairman of the National Labour Party in late 2015
19th Darkhan-Uul	Sainkhüügiin Ganbaatar	Сайнхүүгийн Ганбаатар	Independent	Left the NLP in May 2016
19th Darkhan-Uul	Damdingiin Khayankhyarvaa	Дамдингийн Хаянхярваа	Mongolian People's Party	
20th Orkhon	Otgonbilegiin Sodbileg	Отгонбилэгийн Содбилэг	Mongolian People's Party	
20th Orkhon	Logiin Tsog	Логийн Цог	~~Justice Coalition~~	MPRP Member and Deputy Chairman of the State Great Khural for the JC Caucus
20th Orkhon	Logiin Tsog	Логийн Цог	Independence and Unity	Joined the Independence and Unity Party in May 2016
21st Ulaanbaatar Baganuur, Bagakhangai, Khan-Uul	Tsedevdambyn Oyungerel	Цэдэвдамбын Оюунгэрэл	Democratic Party	
21st Ulaanbaatar Baganuur, Bagakhangai, Khan-Uul	Luvsanvandangiin Bold	Лувсанвандангийн Болд	Democratic Party	
22nd Ulaanbaatar Bayanzürkh, Nalaikh	Jalbasürengiin Batzandan	Жалбасүрэнгийн Батзандан	Democratic Party	
22nd Ulaanbaatar Bayanzürkh, Nalaikh	Davaajavyn Gankhuyag	Даваажавын Ганхуяг	Democratic Party	
22nd Ulaanbaatar Bayanzürkh, Nalaikh	Dashjamtsyn Arvin	Дашжамцын Арвин	~~Mongolian People's Party~~	
22nd Ulaanbaatar Bayanzürkh, Nalaikh	Dashjamtsyn Arvin	Дашжамцын Арвин	Democratic Party	
23rd Ulaanbaatar Sükhbaatar	Luvsannyamyn Gantömör	Лувсаннямын Гантөмөр	Democratic Party	
23rd Ulaanbaatar Sükhbaatar	Rinchinnyamyn Amarjargal	Ринчиннямын Амаржаргал	Democratic Party	
24th Ulaanbaatar Chingeltei	Gantömöriin Uyanga	Гантөмөрийн Уянга	~~Justice Coalition~~	MNDP Member
24th Ulaanbaatar Chingeltei	Gantömöriin Uyanga	Гантөмөрийн Уянга	Independence and Unity	Joined the Independence and Unity Party and became the party chairman in April 2016
24th Ulaanbaatar Chingeltei	Garidkhüügiin Bayarsaikhan	Гарьдхүүгийн Баярсайхан	Democratic Party	
25th Ulaanbaatar Bayangol	Sodnomzunduin Erdene	Содномзундуйн Эрдэнэ	Democratic Party	
25th Ulaanbaatar Bayangol	Saldangiin Odontuyaa	Салдангийн Одонтуяа	Democratic Party	
26th Ulaanbaatar Songinokhairkhan	Luvsangiin Erdenechimeg	Лувсангийн Эрдэнэчимэг	Democratic Party	
26th Ulaanbaatar Songinokhairkhan	Dendeviin Terbishdagva	Дэндэвийн Тэрбишдагва	~~Justice Coalition~~	MPRP Member and briefly served as acting prime minister in 2014
26th Ulaanbaatar Songinokhairkhan	Dendeviin Terbishdagva	Дэндэвийн Тэрбишдагва	Mongolian People's Party	Joined the MPP in 2016
26th Ulaanbaatar Songinokhairkhan	Dolgorsürengiin Sumyaabazar	Долгорсүрэнгийн Сумъяабазар	Mongolian People's Party	

=== Proportional representation ===
28 seats of the State Great Khural were allocated to closed party list proportional representation.

==== Democratic Party ====
List number	Member		Year of birth	Party	Term	First elected	Notes
1	Norovyn Altankhuyag	Норовын Алтанхуяг	1958	Democratic Party	3rd	1996	Served as the Prime Minister of Mongolia and the DP chairman from 2012 to 2014
2	Zandaakhüügiin Enkhbold	Зандаахүүгийн Энхболд	1966	Democratic Party	3rd	2004	Served as Chairman of the State Great Khural for a full four-year term, and the DP chairman from 2014 to 2016
3	Khishigdembereliin Temüüjin	Хишигдэмбэрэлийн Тэмүүжин	1971	Democratic Party	2nd	2008	
4	Chimediin Saikhanbileg	Чимэдийн Сайханбилэг	1969	Democratic Party	3rd	1996	Succeeded Altankhuyag as the next prime minister, serving from 2014 to 2016
5	Dondogdorjiin Erdenebat	Дондогдоржийн Эрдэнэбат	1959	Democratic Party	1st	2012	Chairman of the DP caucus from 2012 to 2014
6	Sharavdorjiin Tüvdendorj	Шаравдоржийн Түвдэндорж	1967	Democratic Party	1st	2012	
7	Radnaagiin Burmaa	Раднаагийн Бурмаа	1958	Democratic Party	1st	2012	
8	Tsevelmaagiin Bayarsaikhan	Цэвэлмаагийн Баярсайхан	1962	Democratic Party	4th	1996	
9	Radnaasümbereliin Gonchigdorj	Раднаасүмбэрэлийн Гончигдорж	1953	Democratic Party	5th	1992	Deputy Chairman of the State Great Khural for the DP caucus
10	Migeddorjiin Batchimeg	Мигэддоржийн Батчимэг	1973	Democratic Party	1st	2012	

==== Mongolian People's Party ====
List number	Member		Year of birth	Party	Term	First elected	Notes
1	Sükhbaataryn Batbold	Сүхбаатарын Батболд	1963	Mongolian People's Party	3rd	2004	Previously served as prime minister from 2009 to 2012 and MPP chairman from 2010 to 2012
2	~~Ukhnaagiin Khürelsükh~~	Ухнаагийн Хүрэлсүх	1968	Mongolian People's Party	3rd	2000	Resigned in November 2012 due to family reasons
2	Davaajantsangiin Sarangerel	Даваажанцангийн Сарангэрэл	1968	Mongolian People's Party	1st	2012	Ranked 10 on party list, succeeded Khürelsükh on 13 December 2012
3	Damdiny Demberel	Дамдины Дэмбэрэл	1941	Mongolian People's Party	6th	1992	Previously served as parliamentary speaker from 2008 to 2012
4	Ölziisaikhany Enkhtüvshin	Өлзийсайханы Энхтүвшин	1958	Mongolian People's Party	4th	2000	
5	Danzangiin Lündeejantsan	Данзангийн Лүндээжанцан	1957	Mongolian People's Party	6th	1992	
6	Tsendiin Nyamdorj	Цэндийн Нямдорж	1956	Mongolian People's Party	6th	1992	
7	Nyamaagiin Enkhbold	Нямаагийн Энхболд	1957	Mongolian People's Party	4th	2000	Chairman of the MPP caucus from 2012 to 2013
8	Yangugiin Sodbaatar	Янгугийн Содбаатар	1974	Mongolian People's Party	1st	2012	
9	Jadambyn Enkhbayar	Жадамбын Энхбаяр	1973	Mongolian People's Party	2nd	2008	

==== Justice Coalition ====
No.	Member		Year of birth	Party	Term	First elected	Notes
1	Chültemiin Ulaan	Чүлтэмийн Улаан	1954	~~Justice Coalition~~	5th	1996	MPRP Member
1	Chültemiin Ulaan	Чүлтэмийн Улаан	1954	Mongolian People's Party	5th	1996	Joined the MPP in 2016
2	Namdagiin Battsereg	Намдагийн Батцэрэг	1959	~~Justice Coalition~~	2nd	1996	MNDP Member and Chairman of the JC Caucus from 2012 until May 2016
2	Namdagiin Battsereg	Намдагийн Батцэрэг	1959	Democratic Party	2nd	1996	Joined the DP in 2016
3	Mishigiin Sonompil	Мишигийн Сономпил	1965	~~Justice Coalition~~	2nd	2004	MNDP Member
3	Mishigiin Sonompil	Мишигийн Сономпил	1965	Democratic Party	2nd	2004	Joined the DP in 2016
4	Zangadyn Bayanselenge	Зангадын Баянсэлэнгэ	1974	Justice Coalition	1st	2012	MPRP Member
5	Oktyabriin Baasankhüü	Октябрийн Баасанхүү	1964	Justice Coalition	1st	2012	MPRP Member
6	Tserendashiin Tsolmon	Цэрэндашийн Цолмон	1953	Justice Coalition	1st	2012	MNDP Member since 2005. Joined the MPRP in October 2012.
7	Tserendashiin Oyuunbaatar	Цэрэндашийн Оюунбаатар	1956	Justice Coalition	2nd	2000	MPRP Member

==== Civil Will–Green Party ====
No.	Member		Year of birth	Party	Term	First elected	Notes
1	Sanjaasürengiin Oyuun	Санжаасүрэнгийн Оюун	1963	Civil Will–Green Party	5th	1998	Party chairwoman of the CWGP from 2012 to 2018
2	Sambuugiin Demberel	Самбуугийн Дэмбэрэл	1956	~~Civil Will–Green Party~~	1st	2012	Joined the DP in May 2016
2	Sambuugiin Demberel	Самбуугийн Дэмбэрэл	1956	Democratic Party	1st	2012	Joined the DP in May 2016
