= 2016 Mongolian parliamentary election =

- 29 June 2016
- All 76 seats in the State Great Khural; 39 seats needed for a majority
- Turnout: 74.35% (▲7.07pp)
Party	Leader	Vote %	Seats	+/–
MPP	Miyeegombyn Enkhbold	45.12	65	+40
Democratic	Zandaakhüügiin Enkhbold	33.14	9	−22
MPRP	Nambaryn Enkhbayar	8.00	1	New
Independents	–	6.00	1	−2
This lists parties that won seats. See the complete results below.
Results by constituency
Prime Minister before	Prime Minister after
Chimediin Saikhanbileg; Democratic	Jargaltulgyn Erdenebat; MPP

Parliamentary elections were held in Mongolia on 29 June 2016. The governing Democratic Party (DP) lost to a landslide victory of the Mongolian People's Party (MPP), retaining only nine of 76 seats in the State Great Khural. Electoral turnout was at 74.35%, a 7.07 percentage point increase from the previous election in 2012.

Although the DP's vote share was down by just two percentage points, a new electoral law promoting a two-party system was passed by the party while in government, which allowed the MPP to secure far more seats with an increased vote share. The DP lost 22 out of their previous 34 seats in the State Great Khural. As a result, the MPP secured a supermajority with 65 of 76 seats, 85% of the parliament, with a total vote share of 45%.

Much of the parliamentary third parties and independents lost their seats due to first-past-the-post voting. Only the Mongolian People's Revolutionary Party was able to retain one of its previous 7 seats.

Following the parliamentary election, MPP leader Miyeegombyn Enkhbold was elected as Chairman of the State Great Khural (speaker) while former finance minister Jargaltulgyn Erdenebat was appointed as prime minister on 7 July 2016.

== Background ==
In the 2012 parliamentary election, the DP won 34 seats, its record highest share which fell short of the simple majority required to unilaterally govern. In contrast, the MPP won 28 seats, the Justice Coalition won 11 seats, and the Civil Will–Green Party (CWGP) won 2 seats. The Justice Coalition was formed between the Mongolian People's Revolutionary Party (MPRP), splinter party from the MPP founded by former president Nambaryn Enkhbayar in 2010, and the Mongolian National Democratic Party (MNDP), splinter party from the DP founded by former prime minister Mendsaikhany Enkhsaikhan in 2005. Three independents were also elected to the State Great Khural.

Following the election, the DP chairman Norovyn Altankhuyag, appointed as prime minister on 10 August 2012, formed a coalition government led by the DP with the Justice Coalition, and the CWGP after lengthy negotiations. The DP's ascension to power coincided with a rapid economic boom largely attributed to the country's mining mega-projects, notably the Oyu Tolgoi gold and copper deposit. However, in May 2012, a major legislation restricting foreign direct investment (FDI) and forbiding the sale of stakes in Mongolian mining companies was passed by the outgoing parliament. Despite the reappeal and renewal of the legislation in late 2013 and again in 2015, the law had a significant impact on investor confidence.

In the 2013 presidential election, sitting DP president Tsakhiagiin Elbegdorj was re-elected on an anti-corruption platform with 50.23% of the total vote. Badmaanyambuugiin Bat-Erdene, candidate of the MPP, received 41.97% while Natsagiin Udval, candidate of the MPRP, got 6.5% of the ballot. Prior to the election, Elbegdorj's candidacy was fully endorsed by coalition partners–the CWGP and the MNDP–and extra-parliamentary parties–the Republican Party and the Motherland Party.

Large-scale bonds, the most significant ones being the Chinggis Bond and the Samurai Bond, were introduced the government to fund its ambitious infrastructure projects. Disagreements between the state and Rio Tinto over various issues led to a halt in the second phase of the Oyu Tolgoi project in 2013. In addition to resource nationalism, global commodity price shocks amid inflation began to slowdown Mongolia's economic growth. Due to concerns of overspending and oversized cabinet, proposals for cabinet downsizing were announced by Altankhuyag in August 2014. Cabinet reshuffle was presented to the State Great Khural on 2 October 2014, which decreased the ministries from 16 to 11. However, political infighting within the DP led to the lack of internal consensus on the nominations for a prolonged period, during which 7 cabinet ministers were relieved.

On 5 November 2014, MPP and DP lawmakers ousted Altankhuyag from the party leadership and the premiership, partly due to his failure to reach an agreement with Rio Tinto and corruption allegations. Accusations of corruption, nepotism, and economic mismanagement were made against Altankhuyag. The cause of his dismissal has also been pointed to political maneuvering by rival factions within the party. Parliamentary speaker Zandaakhüügiin Enkhbold assumed the party leadership from Altankhuyag on 14 November 2014. Chief cabinet secretary, Chimediin Saikhanbileg, was appointed the succeeding prime minister on 21 November 2014. A grand coalition government between the DP, the Justice Coalition, and the MPP was subsequently formed.

In June 2015, the stagnation of the Chinese economic growth severely impacted Mongolia's economic prospects and damaged the mineral prices. The country went into an economic recession, with the GDP shrinking by about 1% and loss of FDI by 59% in 2014. In May 2015, the finance agreement of Oyu Tolgoi was made with Rio Tinto after two years of dispute. Despite kickstarting the underground mine expansion, the agreement was heavily scrutinised both within and outside the party. The deal was condemned by DP leader and parliamentary speaker Enkhbold alongwith several opposition MPP lawmakers. Consequently, the MPP was expulled from the cabinet in August 2015. In 2016, before the end of its term, Saikhanbileg's cabinet relinquished its exclusive right to purchase the Russian-owned 49% stake in Erdenet Mining Corporation – without any parliamentary authorization. FDI recovered starting from 2015 but by 2016, the economic forecast of Mongolia's growth by the IMF was just at 0.4% compared to 17.5% in 2011.

== Electoral system ==
In the 2012 elections, the 76 members of the State Great Khural were elected by a parallel system; 48 were elected from single-member constituencies and 28 from a nationwide constituency by proportional representation. However, on 5 May 2016, the electoral law was amended to remove the proportional representation seats. The changes, speculated to be due to political motivation rather than policy rationale, were expected to marginalise smaller parties, and also removed the right of 150,000 Mongolian expatriates to vote, as they could not be registered in a specific constituency.

All 76 seats of the State Great Khural were to be elected from 76 single-member constituencies. The winning candidate had to receive at least 28% of the valid votes to be elected; if not, a by-election would be held. Voter turnout had to be at least 50% in a constituency for the result to be valid.

== Political parties ==
=== Parliamentary parties ===
The outgoing 6th State Greal Khural consisted of three political parties, one coalition, and three independents at its convocation. By June 2016, prior to its dissolution, the number of parties in parliament increased to five with the foundation of the Independence and Unity Party and the breakdown of the Justice Coalition. The parliamentary floor of the Justice Coalition was dissolved in May 2016 when its seats fell below the required threshold of 8 seats.

Name		Party leader	Floor leader	Ideology	Position	2012 election		At dissolution
Name		Party leader	Floor leader	Ideology	Position	Votes (%)	Seats	At dissolution
DP	Democratic Party	Zandaakhüügiin Enkhbold	Batkhüügiin Garamgaibaatar	Liberal conservatism	Centre-right	35.3%	34 / 76	38 / 76
MPP	Mongolian People's Party	Miyeegombyn Enkhbold	Sandagiin Byambatsogt	Social democracy	Centre-left	31.3%	26 / 76	30 / 76
JC	Justice Coalition	Nambaryn Enkhbayar	Namdagiin Battsereg	Resource nationalism	Big tent	22.3%	11 / 76	4 / 76
—	Independence and Unity (Note: Alternatively translated as the "Sovereignty and Unity" Party (Mongolian: Тусгаар Тогтнол Эв Нэгдлийн Нам))	Gantömöriin Uyanga		Populism	Big tent	—	0 / 76	2 / 76
CWGP	Civil Will–Green Party	Sanjaasürengiin Oyun; Sambuugiin Demberel; Tserendorjiin Gankhuyag		Green liberalism	Centre-left	5.5%	2 / 76	1 / 76

=== Contesting parties ===
On 30 April, a total of 13 parties and 3 coalitions submitted their materials to the General Election Commission (GEC) to participate in the elections. The MNDP, member of the Justice Coalition, did not contest the election and instead formally supported the governing DP. Alongwith the MNDP, the Motherland Party also stated it will endorse the DP to the GEC.

The Civil Will–Green Party was barred from running due to irregularities in its paperwork on May 3. The newcomer National Labour Party was also prevented from running, with its leader, Surenkhuugiin Borgil, standing as an independent instead. The CWGP was later reinstated on the parliamentary ballot on June 7 and the regional election ballot on June 9 via a Supreme Court decision.

12 parties and 3 coalitions were approved by the GEC to contest the elections. A total of 498 candidates registered to contest the elections, with the DP and the MPP being the only parties to contest all 76 seats. Out of the 498 candidates, 69 of them were independents.

Party or coalition	Total
Mongolian People's Party	76
Democratic Party	76
Independence and Unity (MGP, Independence and Unity Party)	9
Civil Will–Green Party	15
Mongolian Traditional United Party	11
Khan Choice (Development Programme Party, Mongolian Liberal Party)	9
Republican Party	36
Mongolian Social Democratic Party	17
Freedom Implementing Party	9
Civil Movement Party	27
Mongolian Democratic Movement Party	3
Mongolian People's Revolutionary Party	71
United Patriots Coalition (United Patriots Party, All Mongolians Labour Party)	9
Mongol Conservative Party	13
Love the People Party	13
Independents	69
Total	498

== Opinion polls ==
Opinion polls conducted by the Sant Maral Foundation and the MEC Barometer suggested that around half of Mongolian voters were undecided about whom to vote for in the 2016 election. The MPP was expected to win a small plurality over the DP, whilst the MPRP was predicted to come third. A survey, conducted by the Sant Maral Foundation in March 2016, revealed that it was likely for the National Labour Party to win a seat with around 5% polling in Ulaanbaatar and 3.4% nationwide.

Polling firm	Fieldwork date	Sample size	MPP	DP	MPRP	MNDP	CWGP	NLP	Other	Ind.	NA	Und./ DK
MEC	Nov 2014	1,000	15.0	27.0	6.0		1.0	–	–	15.0	–	36.0
MEC	Dec 2014	1,000	18.0	27.0	4.0		1.0	–	–	13.0	–	37.0
MEC	Jan 2015	1,000	18.0	24.0	9.0		2.0	–	–	10.0	–	37.0
MEC	Feb 2015	1,000	16.0	18.0	8.0		2.0	–	–	19.0	–	38.0
MEC	Mar 2015	1,000	18.0	16.0	9.0		1.0	–	–	21.0	–	36.0
Sant Maral	27 Mar – 12 Apr 2015	1,200	21.6	18.3	10.5	0.9	2.4	–	1.8	–	13.4	31.1
MEC	Apr 2015	1,000	19.0	12.0	11.0		2.0	–	–	18.0	–	37.0
MEC	May 2015	1,000	14.0	15.0	7.0		1.0	–	–	12.0	–	51.0
MEC	Jul 2015	1,000	16.0	18.0	11.0		2.0	–	–	14.0	–	40.0
MEC	Sept 2015	1,000	18.0	14.0	10.0		2.0	–	–	16.0	–	40.0
MEC	Oct 2015	1,000	16.0	18.0	9.0		2.0	–	–	14.0	–	41.0
MEC	7–11 Mar 2016	1,002	18.0	19.0	7.0	–	–	3.0	–	–	–	53.0
Sant Maral	11–31 Mar 2016	1,500	20.9	17.3	10.5	0.4	1.4	3.4	10.7	0.4	12.5	32.8
MEC	7–12 Apr 2016	1,002	10.0	13.0	6.0	–	–	5.0	6.0	–	–	60.0
2016 election	29 Jun 2016	–	45.1	33.1	8.0	–	0.5	–	7.3	6.0	–	–

== Results ==
The opposition Mongolian People's Party won a supermajority of 65 seats, whilst the governing Democratic Party retained only 9 of its previous 34 seats. Incumbent prime minister Chimediin Saikhanbileg and party chairman, parliamentary speaker Zandaakhüügiin Enkhbold were among the unseated Democratic Party MPs. The Mongolian People's Revolutionary Party and independent, popular folk singer Samadyn Javkhlan each won a single seat in the State Great Khural.

The 239 votes cast for the MPRP candidate in constituency 11 (Gobi-Altai) and the 595 votes cast for an independent candidate in constituency 58 (Khan-Uul) were annulled.

Party	Votes	%	Seats	+/–
Mongolian People's Party	636,138	45.12	65	+39
Democratic Party	467,191	33.14	9	–25
Mongolian People's Revolutionary Party	112,850	8.00	1	–
Independence and Unity	35,394	2.51	0	New
Republican Party	23,118	1.64	0	0
Civil Movement Party	12,264	0.87	0	0
United Patriots Coalition	11,826	0.84	0	0
Civil Will–Green Party	6,568	0.47	0	–2
Mongolian Social Democratic Party	5,308	0.38	0	0
Love the People Party	4,229	0.30	0	New
Mongolian Traditional United Party	3,283	0.23	0	0
Khaan Choice	2,794	0.20	0	0
Mongol Conservative Party	2,055	0.15	0	New
Freedom Implementing Party	1,804	0.13	0	0
Mongolian Democratic Movement Party	432	0.03	0	New
Independents	84,609	6.00	1	–2
Total	1,409,863	100.00	76	0
Valid votes	1,409,863	99.23		
Invalid/blank votes	10,943	0.77		
Total votes	1,420,806	100.00		
Registered voters/turnout	1,911,047	74.35		
Source: General Election Commission

=== Results by constituency ===
2016 Mongolian parliamentary election results by constituency
Province	Constituency	MPP	DP	MPRP	IU	RP	CMP	UPC	CWGP	MSDP	LPP	MTUP	Khaan	MCP	FIP	MDMP	Ind.	Invalid	Electorate
Arkhangai	1	9,817	6,434	167		96		400										86	20,701
Arkhangai	2	7,036	4,816	945													406; 391	102	18,842
Arkhangai	3	9,704	5,252	886														144	19,995
Bayan-Ölgii	4	8,441	7,992															155	19,323
Bayan-Ölgii	5	8,143	7,129			597												107	19,293
Bayan-Ölgii	6	6,880	7,251	924														119	17,921
Bayankhongor	7	7,138	6,491	216													240	73	17,271
Bayankhongor	8	6,845	6,747	344												200		108	17,913
Bayankhongor	9	7,900	7,679	226													188	89	20,425
Bulgan	10	16,329	10,293	1,595				1,230										222	39,490
Govi-Altai	11	14,439	9,814														1,517; 1,185; 1,070	405	35,501
Govisümber and Dornogovi	12	8,900	6,040	777											171			222	20,744
Govisümber and Dornogovi	13	15,606	5,543	778											425			291	31,150
Dornod	14	8,964	7,311	2,073														222	25,348
Dornod	15	8,094	4,454	749		90											1,891; 1,735	77	24,092
Dundgovi	16	6,437	6,559	3,115	971												2,963; 1,408; 921	127	29,659
Zavkhan	17	8,466	8,599	2,500	116												453; 242	47	23,894
Zavkhan	18	6,643	7,077	425	3,232													55	21,476
Övörkhangai	19	10,139	6,932	1,058	482								223				274	161	25,239
Övörkhangai	20	9,655	2,994	449		114											1,527; 402	123	21,643
Övörkhangai	21	9,391	7,158	404													3,196	155	25,434
Ömnögovi	22	7,434	6,640	1,036														97	20,490
Ömnögovi	23	6,912	6,847	867														91	20,341
Sükhbaatar	24	16,133	14,402	435		234												207	38,692
Selenge	25	7,616	6,550	679	323				242								1,371; 127	72	23,763
Selenge	26	7,962	4,319	3,962	777													370	24,539
Selenge	27	6,466	7,145	1,730														177	20,402
Töv	28	8,289	4,278	1,000	526													141	18,990
Töv	29	7,896	4,053	1,779														172	19,007
Töv	30	8,154	6,463	2,371														205	22,452
Uvs	31	8,358	7,737		101		58											43	19,231
Uvs	32	8,021	5,648															94	16,574
Uvs	33	7,611	5,532	217														66	16,085
Khovd	34	4,050	4,342	368	105		101										2,296	31	14,002
Khovd	35	6,602	5,370	1,356	67		132											33	16,723
Khovd	36	7,914	7,757	453	193													53	20,693
Khövsgöl	37	10,711	7,290	362			106			528	163							127	26,577
Khövsgöl	38	14,291	7,218	440	332													136	30,907
Khövsgöl	39	12,075	7,691	547			249											141	27,436
Khentii	40	6,623	4,885						309									139	15,562
Khentii	41	6,232	4,246	436	724							86						73	14,735
Khentii	42	5,841	5,426	1,050														162	16,619
Darkhan-Uul	43	6,553	3,128	452	852			4,365			127							91	21,876
Darkhan-Uul	44	6,716	3,640	2,145	537	171	443				124	596						58	20,250
Darkhan-Uul	45	6,320	4,209	1,399													2,609	132	21,159
Orkhon	46	5,751	3,413	3,112		660					284						2,706	115	22,569
Orkhon	47	2,882	3,188	4,222	100	1,034	2,723			44	62						373	54	20,663
Orkhon	48	4,725	4,628	1,830	208	2,875					577							102	21,525
Ulaanbaatar	49	7,616	6,282	2,357	1,619	547				310		806		93			2,998; 682; 254; 254	143	34,792
Ulaanbaatar	50	11,408	7,461	1,434	1,145	749				309				234				119	29,804
Ulaanbaatar	51	8,660	4,784	2,446	531	1,060	160	422		287	1,947	386	114	48			564; 395	129	32,613
Ulaanbaatar	52	8,985	7,755	2,471	763	492	516			534		239		100	166		3,430	234	37,408
Ulaanbaatar	53	7,677	8,491	1,616	727	794	279			213		183					545; 317; 173; 160	127	29,962
Ulaanbaatar	54	6,574	4,105	1,283	684	254	107			301	55	152				149	11,029; 1,560; 92	162	37,182
Ulaanbaatar	55	6,331	5,548	2,296	247	654		2,224	98	178	94				29		537; 450	90	25,395
Ulaanbaatar	56	9,648	5,517	1,006	427	410	503										2,562; 138	75	26,021
Ulaanbaatar	57	4,318	5,296	1,667	649	367	127	274				178	401				3,658; 749	163	24,333
Ulaanbaatar	58	5,688	5,174	2,308	292	333	398		230								1,190	725	22,467
Ulaanbaatar	59	8,043	5,084	1,202	474	611	101			228							1,634	66	22,914
Ulaanbaatar	60	8,299	5,146	1,197	407	918	104		183	189							660; 597	111	24,620
Ulaanbaatar	61	7,340	5,570	1,464	726	496	219		710					77				165	24,366
Ulaanbaatar	62	8,233	7,834	1,621	419	847	432	2,170	170	374							427	193	31,719
Ulaanbaatar	63	12,704	7,548	3,548	1,081	672	144	564	723	1,168	619				422		713; 662	222	41,271
Ulaanbaatar	64	6,590	4,804	2,192	947	430			1,011	65		180	515				482	193	25,559
Ulaanbaatar	65	6,058	3,479	2,194	1,161	350			142	265			110		97	83	1,395; 1,016; 628; 290	149	25,872
Ulaanbaatar	66	6,844	4,713	2,485	3,571	546	643			236			178				1,412	250	31,774
Ulaanbaatar	67	9,268	8,295	3,139	941	890	283		491			331		255			699; 426	103	34,193
Ulaanbaatar	68	10,614	6,661	1,731	1,539	939	492											130	30,702
Ulaanbaatar	69	6,190	7,477	1,797	670	561			657								3339; 628	128	29,229
Ulaanbaatar	70	7,672	6,687	1,281	366	461			765			146		136			5,553	97	30,899
Ulaanbaatar	71	9,241	5,166	2,127	4,392	730	272							73	68		1009; 166; 94	79	31,863
Ulaanbaatar	72	9,486	5,753	2,436	264	467		177	330		49			83	356		501; 250	107	28,089
Ulaanbaatar	73	9,577	4,132	2,014	478	1,351	306				48		191	92	70			126	25,862
Ulaanbaatar	74	8,106	5,659	3,455	701	390	2,545		507		80		734	283				174	33,299
Ulaanbaatar	75	9,673	6,277	7,360	527	928	188			79				258			800	213	36,895
Ulaanbaatar	76	12,190	7,883	2,844			633						328	323				198	34,728
Total		636,138	467,191	112,850	35,394	23,118	12,264	11,826	6,568	5,308	4,229	3,283	2,794	2,055	1,804	432	84,609	10,943	1,911,047
