= 2012 Mongolian parliamentary election =

- 28 June 2012
- All 76 seats in the State Great Khural; 39 seats needed for a majority
- Turnout: 67.28% (▼9.18pp)
Party	Leader	Vote %	Seats	+/–
Democratic	Norovyn Altankhuyag	35.32	34	+6
MPP	Sükhbaataryn Batbold	31.31	26	−19
Justice Coalition	Nambaryn Enkhbayar	22.31	11	New
Civil Will–Green	Sanjaasürengiin Oyuun	5.51	2	0
Independents	–	–	3	+2
This lists parties that won seats. See the complete results below.
Results by constituency
Prime Minister before	Prime Minister after
Sükhbaataryn Batbold; MPP	Norovyn Altankhuyag; Democratic

Parliamentary elections were held in Mongolia on 28 June 2012 to elect 76 members of the State Great Khural. Also held during the parliamentary elections was the Ulaanbaatar city council election, the first time both were held simultaneously.

For the first time, the election used vote-counting machines under new parliamentary election laws to ensure more precise electoral outcomes.

== Electoral system ==
A new parliamentary election law introduced the status of domestic election observers who are nominated by civil society organisations. Political parties had to announce 48 candidates for constituency seats and 28 candidates for proportional allocation. Among the changes was also a quota of 20% of seats reserved for women.

It was the first Mongolian election to be held using a mixed parallel system, combining plurality block voting and proportional representation.

== Contesting parties ==
On 24 May, the Democratic Party (DP) and the Mongolian People's Party (MPP) announced their candidates for the election. Prior to January, the DP was part of the grand coalition in government with the MPP, but later withdrew to focus on the campaign. A new party that participated was the Mongolian People's Revolutionary Party, which was established in 2010 by former president Nambaryn Enkhbayar.

544 candidates were officially registered by the General Election Commission for the election, of whom 26 were independents, and 518 were running from the following 11 political parties and 2 coalitions:

Party	District	List
Mongolian People's Revolutionary Party	48	28
Democratic Party	48	28
Mongolian Green Party	40	16
Civil Will–Green Party	42	24
Mongolian Traditional United Party	17	6
Motherland Party	10	5
Third Force Coalition (MRP, All Mongolians Labor Party)	29	26
Mongolian Social Democratic Party	7	7
Justice Coalition (MPRP, MNDP)	47	24
Freedom Implementing Party	3	2
Civil Movement Party	21	18
Development Programme Party	16	5
United Patriots Party	0	1
Independents	26	-
Total	354	190

== Campaign ==
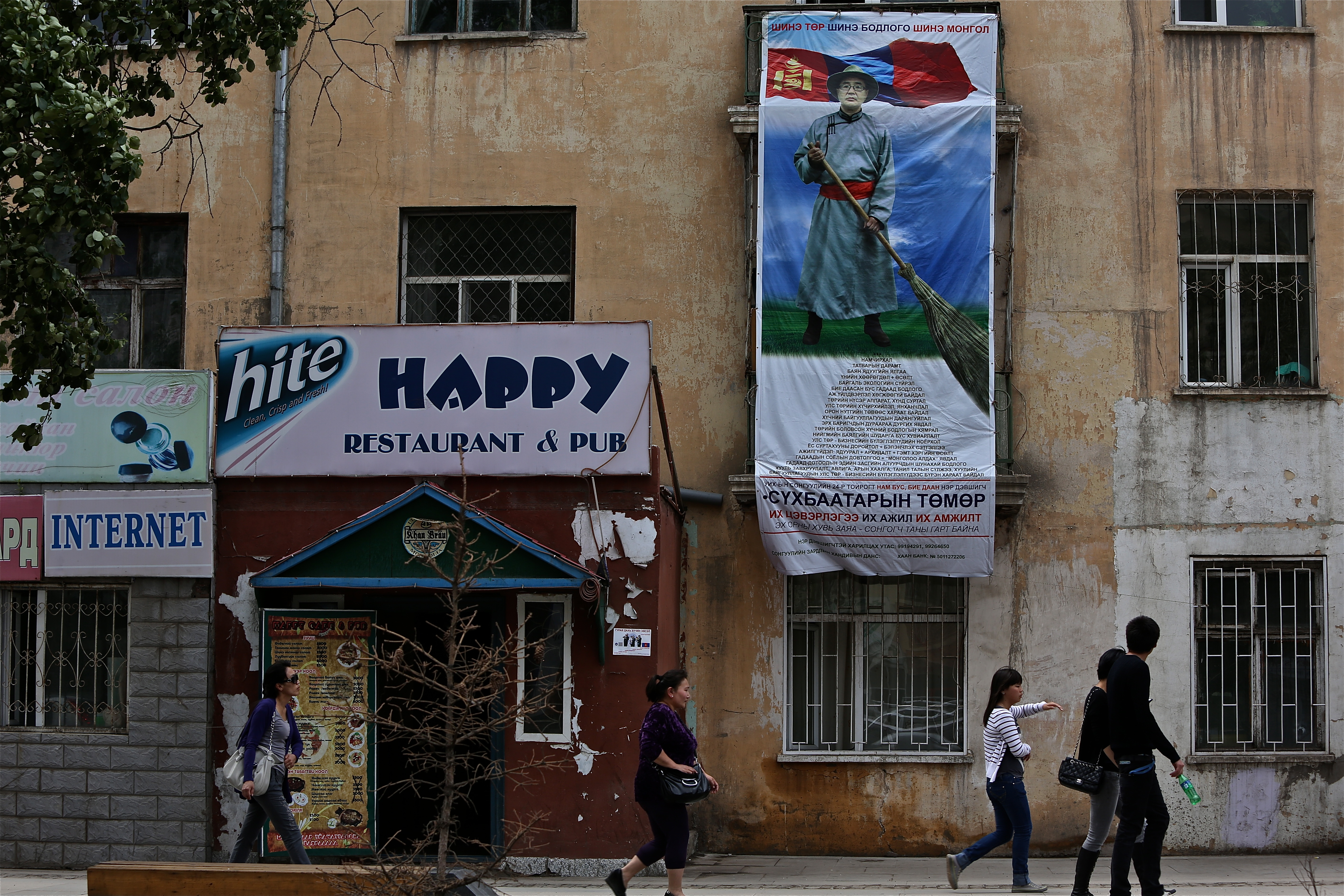
2012 election campaign poster of an independent politician in the 24th constituency; translated "Much Cleaning; Much Work; Much Success"

A large share of the posters were for individual candidates, though showing party logos, which were perceived as being aimed at voters in specific constituencies. By contrast, advertising on television was much broader and much more focused on the parties.

Corruption is a big problem, because of corruption, because of bad governance I think most of the emerging societies are failing and failed. We [don't] want to repeat that.

— President Tsakhiagiin Elbegdorj,

A spate of mining concessions to foreign companies has led to an influx of money into the country. This was also followed by accusations of corruption and a lack of accountability over the political leadership for squandering the country's natural resources and at least tacitly tolerating the mistreatment of Mongolian workers at mines operated by foreign companies. All political parties campaigned against corruption before the election. Mining and Energy Minister Dashdorjiin Zorigt said that "the only way out of this situation is to have more growth that is more just." According to the opinion polling firm, Sumati Luvsandendev, 90% of Mongolians believe that politicians benefit from some form of "special arrangements" over mining concessions to foreign companies. Rapper Tugsjargalyn Munkh-Erdene, also known as "Big Gee," partook in campaigning against corruption. including a controversial video clip against the alleged exploitation by ethnic Chinese. As a result of public pressure, there was speculation of tightening restrictions for investment in the mining sector after the election.

The MPRP campaigned on a platform of "resource nationalism." Reuters suggested its participation in government could impact the mining sector, including the Tavan Tolgoi coal project, which the MPRP wants controlled by Mongolians. Other issues included variations by the parties on how to use the windfall from mining concessions most efficiently, including pensions, infrastructure and other subsidies for local industries. The DP expressed it was best placed to help the poor and unemployed, while calling the MPP held to the elite and foreign mining interests.

== Opinion polls ==
The Sant Maral Foundation and analysts had suggested that the Democratic Party would get a small plurality over the Mongolian People's Party, though neither party would get a majority.

Polling firm	Fieldwork date	Sample size	MPP	DP	JC	CWGP	MRP	MP	MTUP	Other	Ind.	None	Und./NA/ DK
Sant Maral	21 Apr – 2 May 2011	1,000	18.2	19.8	3.5	3.1	0.2	0.6	–	1.8	8.3	–	44.5
SDI	Sept 2011	1,800	13.1	15.4	6.9	1.3	0.5	0.5	0.2	1.0	0.4	20.3	40.4
Sant Maral	16 Mar – 14 Apr 2012	5,200	16.5	17.3	6.3	1.9	0.5	–	–	1.3	8.0	–	48.1
Sant Maral	6–14 Jun 2012	1,000	18.8	28.6	15.9	2.2	1.3	–	0.1	0.6	–	–	32.5
2012 election	28 Jun 2012	–	31.3	35.3	22.3	5.5	1.5	0.8	0.6	2.7	–	–	–

== Conduct ==
The polling stations were open from 7:00 to 20:00. Voting took place using electronic voting machines (EVMs) for the first time. The voting machines were set up by the Canadian company Dominion Voting Systems to report results immediately to the General Election Committee rather than any kind of tabulation by the local election officials. Of the 1,840,824 eligible voters, 67% turned out to vote. There were 544 candidates, of which 174 were women.

Upon voting, President Tsakhiagiin Elbegdorj said, "Today, we Mongolians face an important time to make a historic choice to address Mongolia's development and democracy."

== Results ==
The victory of two Mongolian People's Party candidates in Constituency 10 was annulled due to breaches of electoral law, and the two Democratic Party candidates were elected instead. One candidate in each constituency, 22 and 26, did not receive the required 28% of the vote to be elected; repolling was held on 21 November 2012 and on 14 April 2013, respectively.

Party	Proportional			Constituency			Total seats	+/–
Party	Votes	%	Seats	Votes	%	Seats	Total seats	+/–
Democratic Party	399,247	35.32	10	813,878	34.33	24	34	+5
Mongolian People's Party	353,923	31.31	9	793,165	33.46	17	26	–18
Justice Coalition (MPRP–MNDP)	252,115	22.31	7	423,894	17.88	4	11	New
Civil Will–Green Party	62,325	5.51	2	112,521	4.75	0	2	0
Third Force Coalition (MRP–All Mongolians Labor Party)	16,656	1.47	0	36,415	1.54	0	0	New
Mongolian Green Party	15,075	1.33	0	28,323	1.19	0	0	–
Motherland Party	9,082	0.80	0	16,693	0.70	0	0	New
Mongolian Traditional United Party	6,507	0.58	0	11,487	0.48	0	0	New
Civil Movement Party	6,312	0.56	0	13,459	0.57	0	0	–
United Patriots Party	3,346	0.30	0			0	0	New
Mongolian Social Democratic Party	2,041	0.18	0	3,838	0.16	0	0	New
Development Programme Party	1,982	0.18	0	3,359	0.14	0	0	New
Freedom Implementing Party	1,665	0.15	0	1,365	0.06	0	0	New
Independents				112,274	4.74	3	3	+2
Total	1,130,276	100.00	28	2,370,671	100.00	48	76	0
Valid votes	1,130,276	91.26		1,236,032	100.00			
Invalid/blank votes	108,261	8.74		2	0.00			
Total votes	1,238,537	100.00		1,236,034	100.00			
Registered voters/turnout	1,840,824	67.28		1,836,603	67.30			
Source: General Election Commission

=== Results by constituency ===
Results by constituency

Constituency 1. Arkhangai
Candidate	Party	Votes	%
Nyamjavyn Batbayar	Democratic Party	15,711	39.51
Bayarbaataryn Bolor	Democratic Party	13,591	34.17
Jamyangiin Mönkhbat	Mongolian People's Party	13,423	33.75
Yondonperenlein Baatarbileg	Mongolian People's Party	12,642	31.79
Natsagiin Udval	Justice Coalition	11,371	28.59
Bayanjargalyn Tsogtgerel	Justice Coalition	6,342	15.95
Tseveenjavyn Dulamsüren	Independent	508	1.28
Gantömöriin Khash-Erdene	Mongolian Green Party	438	1.10
Togoochiin Narantsetseg	Civil Will–Green Party	286	0.72
Jigjidsürengiin Khürelbaatar	Civil Will–Green Party	203	0.51
Choijilyn Semjidmaa	Civil Movement Party	172	0.43
Banzragchiin Chültemsüren	Mongolian Traditional United Party	151	0.38
Gombosürengiin Düürenbileg	Third Force Coalition	116	0.29
Total		74,954	100.00
Valid votes		39,769	100.00
Invalid/blank votes		0	0.00
Total votes		39,769	100.00
Registered voters/turnout		57,676	68.95

Constituency 2. Bayan-Ölgii
Candidate	Party	Votes	%
Almalikiin Tlyeikhan	Mongolian People's Party	19,177	49.36
Agiparyn Bakyei	Democratic Party	16,583	42.68
Khalidaldagiin Jyekyei	Mongolian People's Party	15,623	40.21
Chonoin Kulanda	Democratic Party	12,766	32.86
Omaryn Khabsator	Justice Coalition	3,286	8.46
Anuaryn Nota	Justice Coalition	3,239	8.34
Sakhain Bakytkhan	Civil Will–Green Party	882	2.27
Total		71,556	100.00
Valid votes		38,850	100.00
Invalid/blank votes		0	0.00
Total votes		38,850	100.00
Registered voters/turnout		53,548	72.55

Constituency 3. Bayankhongor
Candidate	Party	Votes	%
Khaltmaagiin Battulga	Democratic Party	21,552	56.42
Dashdondogiin Ganbat	Democratic Party	17,748	46.46
Gombojavyn Zandanshatar	Mongolian People's Party	15,175	39.72
Magvany Bilegt	Mongolian People's Party	12,019	31.46
Batchuluuny Ankhnybayar	Justice Coalition	3,383	8.86
Bavuugiin Bayarsaikhan	Justice Coalition	1,823	4.77
Yondongiin Nandintsetseg	Civil Will–Green Party	326	0.85
Dorjsürengiin Nyamkhüü	Mongolian Social Democratic Party	323	0.85
Sanduin Batbaatar	Civil Will–Green Party	253	0.66
Dambiinyamyn Ichinnorov	Mongolian Green Party	174	0.46
Sumaazyn Namsrai	Mongolian Green Party	173	0.45
Ganjuurjavyn Namkhaibal	Development Programme Party	31	0.08
Total		72,980	100.00
Valid votes		38,201	100.00
Invalid/blank votes		0	0.00
Total votes		38,201	100.00
Registered voters/turnout		51,747	73.82

Constituency 4. Bulgan
Candidate	Party	Votes	%
Yondongiin Otgonbayar	Mongolian People's Party	12,220	46.35
Dorjzovdyn Tümenjargal	Democratic Party	7,632	28.95
Sanduijavyn Dashdondog	Justice Coalition	3,144	11.92
Tsend-Ayuushiin Buyanzayaa	Civil Will–Green Party	1,422	5.39
Lkhagvadorjiin Tseveg-Ochir	Mongolian Green Party	228	0.86
Lkhagvajavyn Natsag	Civil Movement Party	199	0.75
Jamsranjavyn Baasankhüü	Third Force Coalition	121	0.46
Badamjavyn Boldsaikhan	Independent	104	0.39
Nyamtserengiin Erdene-Ochir	Mongolian Traditional United Party	92	0.35
Baasanjavyn Badamgarav	Development Programme Party	31	0.12
Total		25,193	100.00
Valid votes		26,365	100.00
Invalid/blank votes		0	0.00
Total votes		26,365	100.00
Registered voters/turnout		38,152	69.11

Constituency 5. Govi-Altai
Candidate	Party	Votes	%
Tsedeviin Dashdorj	Mongolian People's Party	13,429	55.10
Baldanjavyn Ariunsan	Democratic Party	6,536	26.82
Bazarragchaagiin Oyuunbileg	Justice Coalition	2,877	11.80
Lündegiin Nyamdorj	Civil Will–Green Party	295	1.21
Dorjiin Battogtokh	Mongolian Green Party	112	0.46
Choijiljavyn Batbayar	Third Force Coalition	79	0.32
Lkhamsürengiin Khatanbaatar	Mongolian Traditional United Party	44	0.18
Khürelbaataryn Zolbayar	Development Programme Party	30	0.12
Total		23,402	100.00
Valid votes		24,372	100.00
Invalid/blank votes		0	0.00
Total votes		24,372	100.00
Registered voters/turnout		33,905	71.88

Constituency 6. Govisümber And Dornogovi
Candidate	Party	Votes	%
Jamiyansürengiin Batsuuri	Mongolian People's Party	11,834	36.79
Yaichiliin Batsuuri	Democratic Party	11,476	35.68
Chimiddorjiin Chimidsüren	Justice Coalition	4,284	13.32
Tserennadmidiin Batzul	Mongolian Green Party	1,460	4.54
Gombojavyn Batgerel	Civil Movement Party	625	1.94
Dashdavaagiin Batdelger	Civil Will–Green Party	363	1.13
Khishigiin Chuluunbaatar	Third Force Coalition	259	0.81
Bayarsainy Pürevsüren	Independent	222	0.69
Byambajavyn Buyanmönkh	Development Programme Party	33	0.10
Total		30,556	100.00
Valid votes		32,164	100.00
Invalid/blank votes		0	0.00
Total votes		32,164	100.00
Registered voters/turnout		48,515	66.30

Constituency 7. Dornod
Candidate	Party	Votes	%
Khayangaagiin Bolorchuluun	Independent	14,017	42.68
Nyamtaishiryn Nomtoibayar	Mongolian People's Party	10,058	30.63
Püreviin Altangerel	Democratic Party	9,226	28.09
Dorjiin Odbayar	Mongolian People's Party	6,890	20.98
Batboldyn Mönkhtsetseg	Democratic Party	6,623	20.17
Sanjmyatavyn Otgonbaatar	Civil Will–Green Party	4,731	14.41
Jumdaany Enkhjargal	Independent	3,569	10.87
Choijingiin Khurts	Justice Coalition	2,349	7.15
Dorjiin Demchigsüren	Justice Coalition	1,535	4.67
Tsendiin Shinebayar	Third Force Coalition	1,316	4.01
Luvsangiin Oyuuntsetseg	Civil Will–Green Party	772	2.35
Gonchigiin Enkhtsetseg	Mongolian Green Party	376	1.14
Medraagiin Mönkhöö	Mongolian Traditional United Party	356	1.08
Dondogiin Tömörbaatar	Mongolian Green Party	324	0.99
Total		62,142	100.00
Valid votes		32,840	100.00
Invalid/blank votes		0	0.00
Total votes		32,840	100.00
Registered voters/turnout		49,997	65.68

Constituency 8. Dundgovi
Candidate	Party	Votes	%
Batsükhiin Narankhüü	Democratic Party	8,064	42.56
Baataryn Amarsanaa	Mongolian People's Party	6,485	34.23
Osoryn Ganbat	Justice Coalition	2,316	12.22
Lkhagvyn Danzannorov	Independent	971	5.12
Zenemyadaryn Erdenebileg	Independent	158	0.83
Dagvyn Byambasüren	Civil Movement Party	140	0.74
Danzandorjiin Narangerel	Mongolian Green Party	122	0.64
Khishigtiin Möngönnavch	Development Programme Party	14	0.07
Total		18,270	100.00
Valid votes		18,947	99.99
Invalid/blank votes		2	0.01
Total votes		18,949	100.00
Registered voters/turnout		28,824	65.74

Constituency 9. Zavkhan
Candidate	Party	Votes	%
Yadamsürengiin Sanjmyatav	Democratic Party	15,970	46.82
Dulamsürengiin Oyuunkhorol	Mongolian People's Party	15,299	44.86
Dogsomjavyn Baldan-Ochir	Mongolian People's Party	13,586	39.83
Begzsürengiin Shinebaatar	Democratic Party	10,597	31.07
Dorjgotovyn Chimed-Yunden	Independent	5,298	15.53
Lundaajantsangiin Batsaikhan	Justice Coalition	2,444	7.17
Pürevjavyn Gansükh	Justice Coalition	1,201	3.52
Sovdyn Mönkhbat	Motherland Party	517	1.52
Tserendorjiin Tömörkhuyag	Civil Will–Green Party	482	1.41
Tegshjargalyn Erdenechimeg	Civil Will–Green Party	437	1.28
Tsedendambaagiin Makhbal	Mongolian Green Party	302	0.89
Dankharyn Oyuun	Third Force Coalition	291	0.85
Total		66,424	100.00
Valid votes		34,107	100.00
Invalid/blank votes		0	0.00
Total votes		34,107	100.00
Registered voters/turnout		44,635	76.41

Constituency 10. Övörkhangai
Candidate	Party	Votes	%
Sodnomyn Chinzorig	Mongolian People's Party	23,493	47.59
Namkhain Tömörkhüü	Mongolian People's Party	21,267	43.08
Gavaagiin Batkhüü	Democratic Party	19,939	40.39
Dashzevegiin Zorigt	Democratic Party	16,795	34.02
Gankhuyagiin Shiilegdamba	Justice Coalition	6,316	12.79
Jamtsyn Tsedensodnom	Independent	1,561	3.16
Byambaagiin Mönkh-Aldar	Civil Will–Green Party	712	1.44
Bazargochoogiin Enkhbayar	Mongolian Green Party	373	0.76
Sanjmyatavyn Mandakhsüren	Civil Movement Party	309	0.63
Renselmaagiin Adiyaasüren	Mongolian Green Party	281	0.57
Dashjamtsyn Gantulga	Motherland Party	260	0.53
Rentsenlündegiin Tömörbaatar	Third Force Coalition	219	0.44
Losolyn Norjmaa	Civil Movement Party	187	0.38
Total		91,712	100.00
Valid votes		49,370	100.00
Invalid/blank votes		0	0.00
Total votes		49,370	100.00
Registered voters/turnout		71,878	68.69

Constituency 11. Ömnögovi
Candidate	Party	Votes	%
Dashdembereliin Bat-Erdene	Democratic Party	15,408	57.87
Khookhoryn Badamsüren	Mongolian People's Party	5,288	19.86
Dambiigiin Chinzorig	Justice Coalition	3,655	13.73
Gongoryn Gansükh	Civil Will–Green Party	691	2.60
Tseveenii Beejin	Mongolian Social Democratic Party	251	0.94
Tüvdendorjiin Tüvshinjargal	Mongolian Traditional United Party	208	0.78
Norovsambuugiin Sugar	Mongolian Green Party	169	0.63
Radnaagiin Oyuunbat	Civil Movement Party	158	0.59
Lamjavyn Undrakh	Development Programme Party	27	0.10
Total		25,855	100.00
Valid votes		26,626	100.00
Invalid/blank votes		0	0.00
Total votes		26,626	100.00
Registered voters/turnout		37,038	71.89

Constituency 12. Sükhbaatar
Candidate	Party	Votes	%
Mönkhchuluuny Zorigt	Democratic Party	10,898	39.65
Rentsengiin Bud	Mongolian People's Party	8,989	32.70
Davaadorjiin Delgertsogt	Justice Coalition	5,319	19.35
Magsaryn Ariunbat	Mongolian Traditional United Party	133	0.48
Jargalyn Otgonsüren	Mongolian Green Party	131	0.48
Dügersürengiin Sükhgerel	Civil Movement Party	91	0.33
Total		25,561	100.00
Valid votes		27,488	100.00
Invalid/blank votes		0	0.00
Total votes		27,488	100.00
Registered voters/turnout		36,964	74.36

Constituency 13. Selenge
Candidate	Party	Votes	%
Sangajavyn Bayartsogt	Democratic Party	18,444	40.72
Jargaltulgyn Erdenebat	Mongolian People's Party	17,062	37.67
Doniogiin Tsogt-Ochir	Democratic Party	12,334	27.23
Sodkhüügiin Gerelmaa	Mongolian People's Party	11,146	24.61
Perenlein Bold	Justice Coalition	10,420	23.01
Amjaagiin Enkhbold	Justice Coalition	9,888	21.83
Gongorjavyn Ganbat	Civil Will–Green Party	1,673	3.69
Puntsagiin Bayanjargal	Civil Will–Green Party	1,125	2.48
Avirmediin Oyuungerel	Mongolian Green Party	675	1.49
Mönkhiin Myagmar	Mongolian Green Party	458	1.01
Terbishiin Chimeddorj	Third Force Coalition	222	0.49
Nemekhiin Ayuur	Third Force Coalition	177	0.39
Agvaandorjiin Saruul	Civil Movement Party	107	0.24
Namsrain Bat-Erdene	Development Programme Party	105	0.23
Total		83,836	100.00
Valid votes		45,291	100.00
Invalid/blank votes		0	0.00
Total votes		45,291	100.00
Registered voters/turnout		69,407	65.25

Constituency 14. Töv
Candidate	Party	Votes	%
Miyeegombyn Enkhbold	Mongolian People's Party	17,821	44.85
Sükhbaataryn Batbold	Mongolian People's Party	16,685	41.99
Dulamsürengiin Dorjpürev	Democratic Party	12,392	31.19
Gombosürengiin Bayarsaikhan	Democratic Party	9,589	24.13
Manakhüügiin Ganbat	Justice Coalition	6,897	17.36
Nanzadyn Chuluunbaatar	Justice Coalition	6,671	16.79
Lkhagvaagiin Mönkhsaikhan	Civil Will–Green Party	1,111	2.80
Urtbayaryn Khürelbaatar	Civil Will–Green Party	1,016	2.56
Tsagaanbaataryn Tüvshinjargal	Third Force Coalition	362	0.91
Dendeviin Sandagsüren	Motherland Party	304	0.77
Byambajavyn Buyanbadrakh	Development Programme Party	102	0.26
Total		72,950	100.00
Valid votes		39,731	100.00
Invalid/blank votes		0	0.00
Total votes		39,731	100.00
Registered voters/turnout		59,373	66.92

Constituency 15. Uvs
Candidate	Party	Votes	%
Chimediin Khürelbaatar	Mongolian People's Party	21,515	57.48
Battogtokhyn Choijilsüren	Mongolian People's Party	19,533	52.18
Davaagiin Nyamkhüü	Democratic Party	12,528	33.47
Tümenjargalyn Mendsaikhan	Democratic Party	11,621	31.05
Samandyn Javkhlan	Justice Coalition	4,251	11.36
Ayuurzany Davaasambuu	Justice Coalition	802	2.14
Khasagiin Oyuunbileg	Third Force Coalition	373	1.00
Davaagiin Baatarkhüü	Mongolian Traditional United Party	201	0.54
Biraagiin Bat-Erdene	Civil Will–Green Party	196	0.52
Avirmediin Erdenesoyol	Civil Movement Party	177	0.47
Gonchigiin Chuluunbat	Civil Will–Green Party	127	0.34
Garamdorjiin Baigalimaa	Mongolian Green Party	96	0.26
Total		71,420	100.00
Valid votes		37,431	100.00
Invalid/blank votes		0	0.00
Total votes		37,431	100.00
Registered voters/turnout		47,509	78.79

Constituency 16. Khovd
Candidate	Party	Votes	%
Sandagiin Byambatsogt	Mongolian People's Party	14,817	42.03
Dogsomyn Battsogt	Justice Coalition	11,503	32.63
Shirnenbandiin Adishaa	Independent	11,125	31.56
Davaagiin Kyoküshyuzan Batbayar	Democratic Party	8,695	24.67
Gendenjavyn Nyamdavaa	Mongolian People's Party	7,370	20.91
Bökhchuluuny Pürevdorj	Democratic Party	6,383	18.11
Namsürengiin Erdenetungalag	Independent	4,062	11.52
Gongoryn Doyod	Justice Coalition	1,599	4.54
Ariyaagiin Bayasgalan	Independent	514	1.46
Toshilyn Bayarkhüü	Mongolian Social Democratic Party	371	1.05
Batsuuriin Batdorj	Mongolian Green Party	320	0.91
Lkhagvyn Altankhuyag	Civil Will–Green Party	256	0.73
Tungaagiin Khüderchuluun	Civil Will–Green Party	233	0.66
Kharnüdengiin Javzandulam	Mongolian Green Party	189	0.54
Chuluuny Nankhir	Mongolian Traditional United Party	179	0.51
Total		67,616	100.00
Valid votes		35,250	100.00
Invalid/blank votes		0	0.00
Total votes		35,250	100.00
Registered voters/turnout		48,679	72.41

Constituency 17. Khövsgöl
Candidate	Party	Votes	%
Luvsantserengiin Enkh-Amgalan	Mongolian People's Party	24,166	43.12
Tserenpiliin Davaasüren	Independent	19,400	34.62
Lkhagvyn Mönkhbaatar	Mongolian People's Party	17,830	31.81
Tserenbatyn Sedvanchig	Democratic Party	14,101	25.16
Lamjavyn Gündalai	Democratic Party	12,029	21.46
Badarchiin Erdenebat	Motherland Party	11,980	21.38
Khaichaagiin Batsaikhan	Justice Coalition	3,846	6.86
Baataryn Sanchir	Justice Coalition	1,356	2.42
Pürevtserengiin Enkhtsetseg	Mongolian Green Party	552	0.98
Lamjavyn Dorjpalam	Mongolian Green Party	430	0.77
Byambajavyn Bat-Ochir	Mongolian Traditional United Party	264	0.47
Tömöriin Mönkh-Orgil	Third Force Coalition	243	0.43
Bayanbilegiin Dügerjav	Civil Will–Green Party	229	0.41
Total		106,426	100.00
Valid votes		56,045	100.00
Invalid/blank votes		0	0.00
Total votes		56,045	100.00
Registered voters/turnout		79,567	70.44

Constituency 18. Khentii
Candidate	Party	Votes	%
Badmaanyambuugiin Bat-Erdene	Mongolian People's Party	11,878	37.90
Batkhüügiin Garamgaibaatar	Democratic Party	10,749	34.29
Navaansamdangiin Ganbyamba	Mongolian People's Party	10,692	34.11
Möngöntsetsegiin Khüderbaatar	Democratic Party	9,500	30.31
Sanduin Jargal	Civil Will–Green Party	4,069	12.98
Luvsannamjilyn Ganbat	Justice Coalition	3,478	11.10
Badarchiin Tuyaa	Justice Coalition	3,129	9.98
Byambasürengiin Khüder-Yan	Civil Will–Green Party	2,923	9.33
Batjargalyn Gansükh	Third Force Coalition	517	1.65
Dorjiin Altannavch	Mongolian Green Party	314	1.00
Tömör-Ochiryn Tsambalkhündev	Mongolian Green Party	265	0.85
Dambyn Odgerel	Mongolian Traditional United Party	241	0.77
Looshiryn Otgontsetseg	Civil Movement Party	233	0.74
Total		57,988	100.00
Valid votes		31,343	100.00
Invalid/blank votes		0	0.00
Total votes		31,343	100.00
Registered voters/turnout		45,426	69.00

Constituency 19. Darkhan-Uul
Candidate	Party	Votes	%
Sainkhüügiin Ganbaatar	Independent	22,465	53.80
Damdiny Khayankhyarvaa	Mongolian People's Party	12,369	29.62
Jamiyankhorloogiin Sükhbaatar	Mongolian People's Party	11,575	27.72
Buyaagiin Tulga	Justice Coalition	6,264	15.00
Büdeegiin Mönkhtuyaa	Democratic Party	6,214	14.88
Jambalyn Mönkhtör	Independent	6,147	14.72
Mendsaikhany Enkhsaikhan	Justice Coalition	5,964	14.28
Gongoryn Gantulga	Democratic Party	5,077	12.16
Gombosürengiin Arslan	Third Force Coalition	1,962	4.70
Tsanjidiin Shirendev	Civil Will–Green Party	798	1.91
Byangarjavyn Bat	Motherland Party	525	1.26
Choijamtsyn Pürevsüren	Civil Movement Party	299	0.72
Sanjaajavyn Tsolmon	Development Programme Party	261	0.62
Altangereliin Pürevjav	Mongolian Green Party	253	0.61
Tserenpiliin Törbadrakh	Mongolian Green Party	143	0.34
Total		80,316	100.00
Valid votes		41,760	100.00
Invalid/blank votes		0	0.00
Total votes		41,760	100.00
Registered voters/turnout		62,730	66.57

Constituency 20. Orkhon
Candidate	Party	Votes	%
Otgonbilegiin Sodbileg	Mongolian People's Party	17,528	40.71
Logiin Tsog	Justice Coalition	12,141	28.20
Dorjdambyn Damba-Ochir	Mongolian People's Party	11,780	27.36
Khadbaataryn Zoljargal	Democratic Party	10,889	25.29
Dürzeegiin Odkhüü	Democratic Party	10,817	25.12
Damdinsürengiin Galbaatar	Justice Coalition	8,573	19.91
Zes-Erdene Dashzevegiin Altankhuyag	Civil Will–Green Party	4,290	9.96
Mijiddorjiin Battsooj	Civil Will–Green Party	2,178	5.06
Tsogbadrakhyn Erdenechuluun	Mongolian Social Democratic Party	958	2.22
Ganboldyn Dashdemberel	Independent	911	2.12
Tserendambyn Sarantuyaa	Mongolian Green Party	777	1.80
Pürevsürengiin Battör	Third Force Coalition	606	1.41
Orgodolyn Nyamdavaa	Mongolian Green Party	274	0.64
Püreviin Altan-Erdene	Freedom Implementing Party	202	0.47
Chültemsürengiin Adiyaakhüü	Development Programme Party	195	0.45
Total		82,119	100.00
Valid votes		43,057	100.00
Invalid/blank votes		0	0.00
Total votes		43,057	100.00
Registered voters/turnout		65,350	65.89

Constituency 21. Khan Uul, Bagakhangai And Baganuur
Candidate	Party	Votes	%
Tsedevdambyn Oyuungerel	Democratic Party	27,243	40.69
Luvsanvandangiin Bold	Democratic Party	21,560	32.20
Baatarjavyn Lkhagvajav	Mongolian People's Party	16,271	24.30
Tsogtyn Batbayar	Mongolian People's Party	15,257	22.79
Lkhamsürengiin Jambaljav	Justice Coalition	12,795	19.11
Khosbayaryn Amarsaikhan	Justice Coalition	10,870	16.24
Yadmaagiin Battsetseg	Civil Movement Party	3,562	5.32
Chuluunbatyn Enkhtuyaa	Civil Will–Green Party	3,106	4.64
Erdenechimegiin Sugar	Civil Will–Green Party	2,240	3.35
Tserendoogiin Enkhbat	Independent	1,800	2.69
Erdenechimegiin Narantuyaa	Mongolian Green Party	1,265	1.89
Sanduijavyn Boldbaatar	Mongolian Green Party	929	1.39
Luuzangiin Bayarkhüü	Third Force Coalition	833	1.24
Ölziibalyn Urtnasan	Third Force Coalition	730	1.09
Tsagaany Chinbat	Motherland Party	653	0.98
Lkhamsürengiin Enkhjargal	Development Programme Party	388	0.58
Total		119,502	100.00
Valid votes		66,953	100.00
Invalid/blank votes		0	0.00
Total votes		66,953	100.00
Registered voters/turnout		101,385	66.04

Constituency 22. Bayanzürkh and Nalaikh
Candidate	Party	Votes	%
Jalbasürengiin Batzandan	Democratic Party	44,390	33.77
Davaajavyn Gankhuyag	Democratic Party	43,658	33.21
Batjargalyn Batzorig	Mongolian People's Party	32,409	24.66
Dashjamtsyn Arvin	Mongolian People's Party	32,350	24.61
Ishbadamyn Narantuyaa	Democratic Party	32,091	24.41
Begzjavyn Mönkhbaatar	Mongolian People's Party	30,951	23.55
Ochirbatyn Chuluunbat	Justice Coalition	29,434	22.39
Zorigiin Altai	Civil Will–Green Party	25,895	19.70
Khurtsyn Oyuuntsetseg	Justice Coalition	21,900	16.66
Gansükhiin Tserenchunt	Justice Coalition	17,407	13.24
Rinzaany Bulgamaa	Civil Will–Green Party	7,377	5.61
Gelegiin Baasan	Independent	6,746	5.13
Erdenechuluuny Zorigt	Civil Will–Green Party	6,150	4.68
Naranchuluuny Narantsetseg	Mongolian Green Party	2,899	2.21
Badrakhyn Chuluunbat	Mongolian Traditional United Party	2,808	2.14
Dambadondogiin Baatarjav	Independent	2,348	1.79
Batzanyn Batzayaa	Mongolian Traditional United Party	2,239	1.70
Damdinsürengiin Mönkhtsetseg	Independent	2,012	1.53
Baataryn Boldbaatar	Third Force Coalition	1,626	1.24
Byambajavyn Odsüren	Third Force Coalition	1,591	1.21
Maaguujingiin Erdenebileg	Mongolian Green Party	1,438	1.09
Damdinjavyn Batnasan	Third Force Coalition	1,410	1.07
Amarajargalyn Divaachamba	Mongolian Traditional United Party	1,240	0.94
Ariunboldyn Ariuntsatsral	Civil Movement Party	996	0.76
Luvsangiin Tüvshintsengel	Freedom Implementing Party	677	0.52
Balchindorjiin Enkhsaikhan	Civil Movement Party	674	0.51
Shagdarjavyn Sükhbat	Mongolian Social Democratic Party	562	0.43
Bekhbatyn Ikhbayar	Development Programme Party	548	0.42
Total		353,826	100.00
Valid votes		131,447	100.00
Invalid/blank votes		0	0.00
Total votes		131,447	100.00
Registered voters/turnout		206,836	63.55

Constituency 23. Sükhbaatar
Candidate	Party	Votes	%
Luvsannyamyn Gantömör	Democratic Party	22,490	39.07
Rinchinnyamyn Amarjargal	Democratic Party	19,240	33.42
Chuluuny Gankhuyag	Mongolian People's Party	17,733	30.81
Tsedenbalyn Tsogzolmaa	Mongolian People's Party	17,574	30.53
Tserendambyn Bayarkhüü	Justice Coalition	7,616	13.23
Tsültemiin Mönkhjin	Justice Coalition	7,520	13.06
Chimediin Bazar	Civil Will–Green Party	2,929	5.09
Davaasambuugiin Battulga	Civil Will–Green Party	2,607	4.53
Gembeliin Temüüjin	Third Force Coalition	2,368	4.11
Nanzadyn Narantsetseg	Mongolian Green Party	1,152	2.00
Zunduin Baigalmaa	Mongolian Green Party	1,148	1.99
Sharkhüügiin Nanjid	Third Force Coalition	857	1.49
Düürengiin Badarch	Mongolian Traditional United Party	491	0.85
Rentsendorjiin Uuganbaatar	Civil Movement Party	451	0.78
Dugarsürengiin Davaadorj	Motherland Party	381	0.66
Jambyn Sanduijav	Mongolian Social Democratic Party	273	0.47
Sükhbaataryn Delgertsogt	Development Programme Party	208	0.36
Total		105,038	100.00
Valid votes		57,563	100.00
Invalid/blank votes		0	0.00
Total votes		57,563	100.00
Registered voters/turnout		89,514	64.31

Constituency 24. Chingeltei
Candidate	Party	Votes	%
Gantömöriin Uyanga	Justice Coalition	21,199	31.61
Garidkhüügiin Bayarsaikhan	Democratic Party	21,134	31.51
Dashdorjiin Zorigt	Mongolian People's Party	19,753	29.45
Batyn Batbaatar	Democratic Party	16,368	24.41
Dagvadorjiin Ochirbat	Mongolian People's Party	16,251	24.23
Gombosürengiin Oyuungerel	Justice Coalition	12,622	18.82
Dagvadorjiin Ulambayar	Civil Will–Green Party	2,935	4.38
Törbatyn Altanshagai	Civil Will–Green Party	2,477	3.69
Damdinsürengiin Gansüren	Mongolian Traditional United Party	1,700	2.53
Banzragchiin Mönkhtsetseg	Mongolian Green Party	1,384	2.06
Törmönkhiin Bold	Independent	1,001	1.49
Sükhbaataryn Tömör	Independent	925	1.38
Byambaagiin Khosbayar	Third Force Coalition	863	1.29
Yerentein Ochir	Third Force Coalition	698	1.04
Natsagdorjiin Pürevsüren	Mongolian Green Party	688	1.03
Norovdondogiin Jamsran	Freedom Implementing Party	486	0.72
Tsendiin Altan-Utas	Civil Movement Party	475	0.71
Sambalkhündeviin Khash-Erdene	Motherland Party	432	0.64
Davaanyamyn Enkhtuyaa	Development Programme Party	383	0.57
Total		121,774	100.00
Valid votes		67,062	100.00
Invalid/blank votes		0	0.00
Total votes		67,062	100.00
Registered voters/turnout		105,112	63.80

Constituency 25. Bayangol
Candidate	Party	Votes	%
Sodnomzunduin Erdene	Democratic Party	32,036	40.04
Saldangiin Odontuyaa	Democratic Party	30,768	38.45
Namjaagiin Dashzeveg	Justice Coalition	21,225	26.53
Tsendiin Mönkh-Orgil	Mongolian People's Party	20,309	25.38
Luvsandashiin Amgalan	Mongolian People's Party	16,979	21.22
Dashdorjiin Batmönkh	Justice Coalition	11,162	13.95
Maamkhüügiin Enkhtaivan	Civil Will–Green Party	4,291	5.36
Baataryn Tuul	Civil Will–Green Party	3,053	3.82
Galigaagiin Bayarsaikhan	Third Force Coalition	1,460	1.82
Jadambaagiin Sarantuyaa	Mongolian Green Party	1,299	1.62
Adiyaagiin Erdenebileg	Mongolian Social Democratic Party	1,100	1.37
Khaltaryn Oyuuntsetseg	Third Force Coalition	1,020	1.27
Khajidsürengiin Altantsatsralt	Mongolian Green Party	959	1.20
Dagvatserengiin Üürtsaikh	Civil Movement Party	814	1.02
Batsükhiin Odonchimeg	Civil Movement Party	680	0.85
Luvsandendeviin Sainbayar	Mongolian Traditional United Party	569	0.71
Lut-Ochiryn Batnasan	Motherland Party	452	0.56
Magsaryn Javzandulam	Development Programme Party	316	0.39
Total		148,492	100.00
Valid votes		80,017	100.00
Invalid/blank votes		0	0.00
Total votes		80,017	100.00
Registered voters/turnout		123,642	64.72

Constituency 26. Songino Khairkhan
Candidate	Party	Votes	%
Dendeviin Terbishdagva	Justice Coalition	42,399	37.20
Luvsangiin Erdenechimeg	Democratic Party	35,583	31.22
Lombyn Erkhembayar	Democratic Party	30,659	26.90
Dolgorsürengiin Sumyaabazar	Mongolian People's Party	28,521	25.02
Davaadorjiin Ganbold	Democratic Party	28,181	24.72
Jambalyn Khatanbaatar	Justice Coalition	25,659	22.51
Sumiyaagiin Tümengerel	Mongolian People's Party	24,349	21.36
Gonchigzevegiin Tenger	Mongolian People's Party	23,794	20.88
Gendensürengiin Byambasüren	Justice Coalition	20,420	17.91
Bazarsadyn Jargalsaikhan	Third Force Coalition	12,529	10.99
Khadbaataryn Bat-Yalalt	Civil Will–Green Party	11,130	9.76
Sharavyn Pürevsüren	Civil Will–Green Party	3,625	3.18
Tsetsgeegiin Mönkhbayar	Independent	2,857	2.51
Öödösiin Nyamtseveen	Civil Will–Green Party	2,627	2.30
Pürev-Oidovyn Davaanyam	Mongolian Green Party	2,477	2.17
Perenleijamtsyn Bayarsaikhan	Mongolian Green Party	1,947	1.71
Erdenechimegiin Amap	Third Force Coalition	1,836	1.61
Ayuuryn Tserendolgor	Third Force Coalition	1,731	1.52
Nyamaagiin Davaa	Civil Movement Party	1,607	1.41
Otgony Naranchimeg	Civil Movement Party	1,503	1.32
Pürevjalyn Tömörbaatar	Independent	1,387	1.22
Begziin Khishigbayar	Mongolian Green Party	1,329	1.17
Baasanjavyn Battsengel	Independent	1,290	1.13
Baldangiin Enkhgerel	Motherland Party	1,189	1.04
Dashpüreviin Örnökhbayar	Independent	876	0.77
Dagvadorjiin Baigalmaa	Development Programme Party	687	0.60
Jamiyansürengiin Nyam	Mongolian Traditional United Party	571	0.50
Total		310,763	100.00
Valid votes		113,983	100.00
Invalid/blank votes		0	0.00
Total votes		113,983	100.00
Registered voters/turnout		179,194	63.61

== Reactions ==
Mongolian President Tsakhiagiin Elbegdorj pointed out that he was led to believe that all parties had so far accepted the result thus a coalition is likely to be formed in August. He then added that "the Mongolian People's Party seems to be losing to the Democratic Party" and that he "hope[s] that Mongolia is going to make great progress towards democracy, justice and prosperity."

On 30 June, the Mongolian People's Party (MPP) and eight smaller parties called for a new election with manual hand counting throughout every constituency in the country. MPP Secretary Yangugiin Sodbaatar said that the EVMs "violated the constitution. We are [thus] demanding the traditional system of counting votes by hand in every election constituency across the whole country to end this confusion that the population has about the voting machines and automated systems." However, the Democratic Party did not sign a petition to call for a new election, backing the automated system.

As a result of the election, the Democratic Party (DP) became the plurality in the parliament. The DP formed a coalition government with the Justice Coalition and Civil Will-Green Party in August 2012. Consequently, the MPP became the opposition in the parliament. Norovyn Altankhuyag, the Chairman of the DP, was appointed the next Prime Minister of Mongolia on 10 August.
