= Justice Coalition (Mongolia) =

Political party alliance in Mongolia (2012–2016)

Justice Coalition Шударга ёс эвсэл
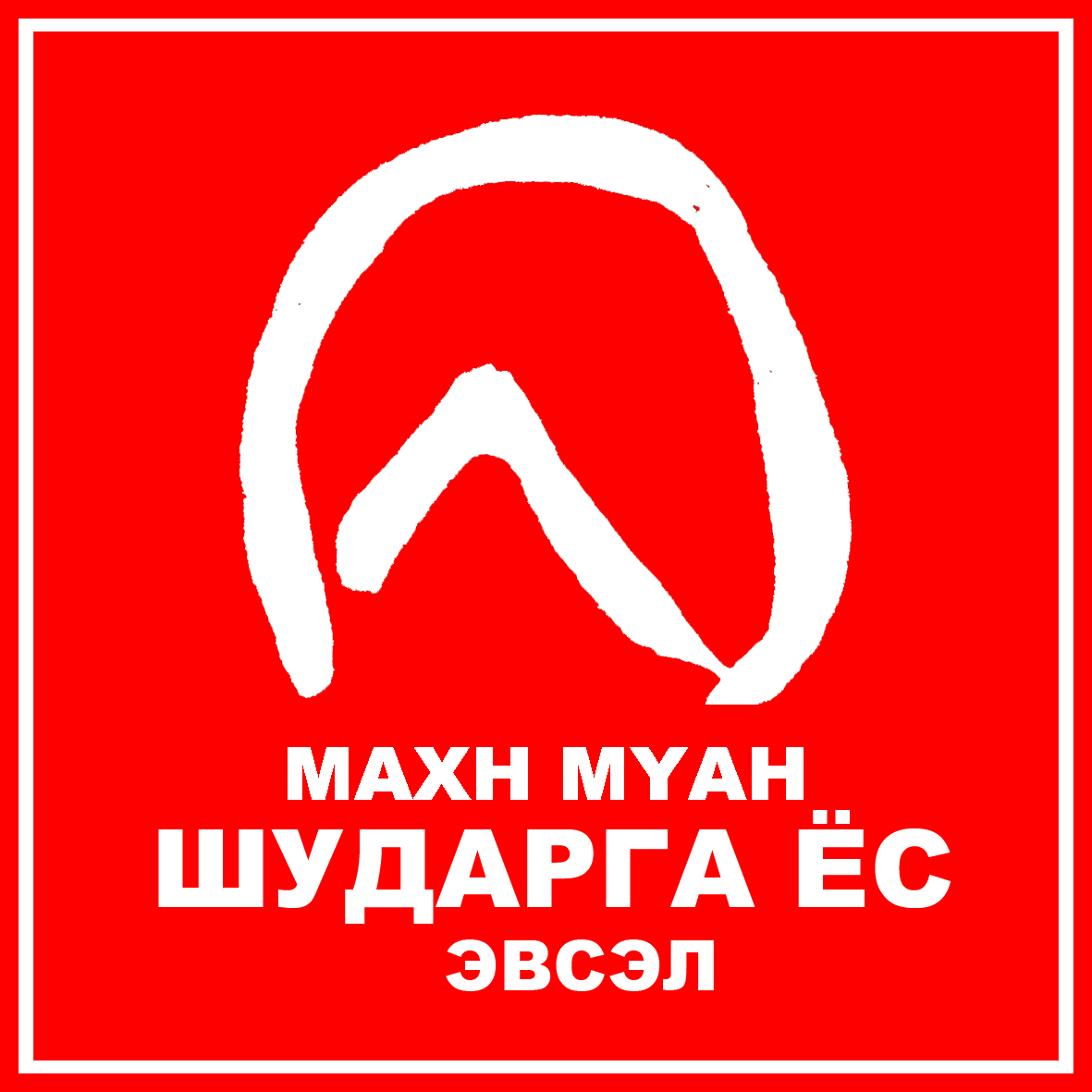
- Abbreviation: ШЁЭ
- Leader: Nambaryn Enkhbayar
- Founded: 8 May 2012
- Dissolved: c. June 2016 (in accordance with the law)
- Ideology: Big tent Populism; Resource nationalism
- Coalition parties: Mongolian People's Revolutionary Party; Mongolian National Democratic Party
- Colors: Red; Blue
- State Great Khural (2012–2016): 11 / 76

The Justice Coalition (Mongolian: Шударга ёс эвсэл, romanized: Shudarga yos evsel) was a coalition of political parties in Mongolia for the 2012 parliamentary elections. The coalition comprised the Mongolian People's Revolutionary Party (MPRP) and the Mongolian National Democratic Party (MNDP).

In 2012, the Justice Coalition won 11 out of 76 seats in the State Great Khural, placing third. After negotiations with the ruling Democratic Party (DP), the Justice Coalition entered, as a minority partner, into a coalition government formed by the DP in September 2012.

The coalition's parliamentary caucus was dissolved in May 2016, but still remained a legal entity until June 2016, when it was dissolved in accordance with the law.

== History ==
In the 2012 parliamentary elections, the Justice Coalition, comprising the MPRP and the MNDP, won 11 seats in the State Great Khural, becoming the third-largest party. With more than the required 8 seats, the Justice Coalition was able to establish a parliamentary caucus.

On 15 May 2014, a member of parliament and the MNDP, Dogsomyn Battsogt, left the coalition due to internal disagreements. Later, he left the MNDP on 10 October and crossed to the floor of the governing Democratic Party (DP) on 21 October.

A year later, on 21 March 2015, MNDP MP Gantömöriin Uyanga and MPRP MP Logiin Tsog announced they would be leaving the coalition. They claimed the coalition was not actively working for its 2012 election program, "The Ten Revolutions to Save Mongolia" (Mongolian: Монголоо аврах таван хувьсгал), and instead joined the coalition government for ministerial positions. Uyanga left the MNDP and joined the Sovereignty and Unity Party on 7 April, eventually becoming party chairman on 10 April 2016. Tsog later joined her party on 3-4 May 2016.

Subsequently, on 4 May, MPRP lawmakers Chültemiin Ulaan and Dendeviin Terbishdagva left their parties to join the Mongolian People's Party (MPP), bringing down the number of Justice Coalition seats to six. Following their departure, the caucus was disbanded the next day because the number of seats fell below the benchmark requirement. Without a caucus, MNDP members Mishigiin Sonompil and the chairperson of the now-defunct caucus Namdagiin Battsereg renewed their DP memberships on 7 May.

Prior to the 2016 parliamentary election and the legal deadline for dissolution, the Justice Coalition had only four seats, all of them being MPRP members.

== Composition ==
Party	Abbr.	Leader	Seats (Note: At commencement)	Position	Ideology
Mongolian People's Revolutionary Party; Монгол Ардын Хувьсгалт Нам; Mongol Ardyn Khuvisgalt Nam	MPRP МАХН	Nambaryn Enkhbayar	7 / 76	Centre-left	Left-wing populism
Mongolian National Democratic Party; Монгол Үндэсний Ардчилсан Нам; Mongol Ündesnii Ardchilsan Nam	MNDP МҮАН	Mendsaikhany Enkhsaikhan	4 / 76	Centre-right	Conservatism Mongolian nationalism

== Electoral history ==
=== State Great Khural elections ===
Election	Party leader	Votes	%	Seats	+/–	Position	Government
2012	Nambaryn Enkhbayar	252,115	22.31%	11 / 76	New	▲3rd	Coalition government
