= Jargaltulgyn Erdenebat =

Prime Minister of Mongolia from 2016 to 2017

- Жаргалтулгын Эрдэнэбат
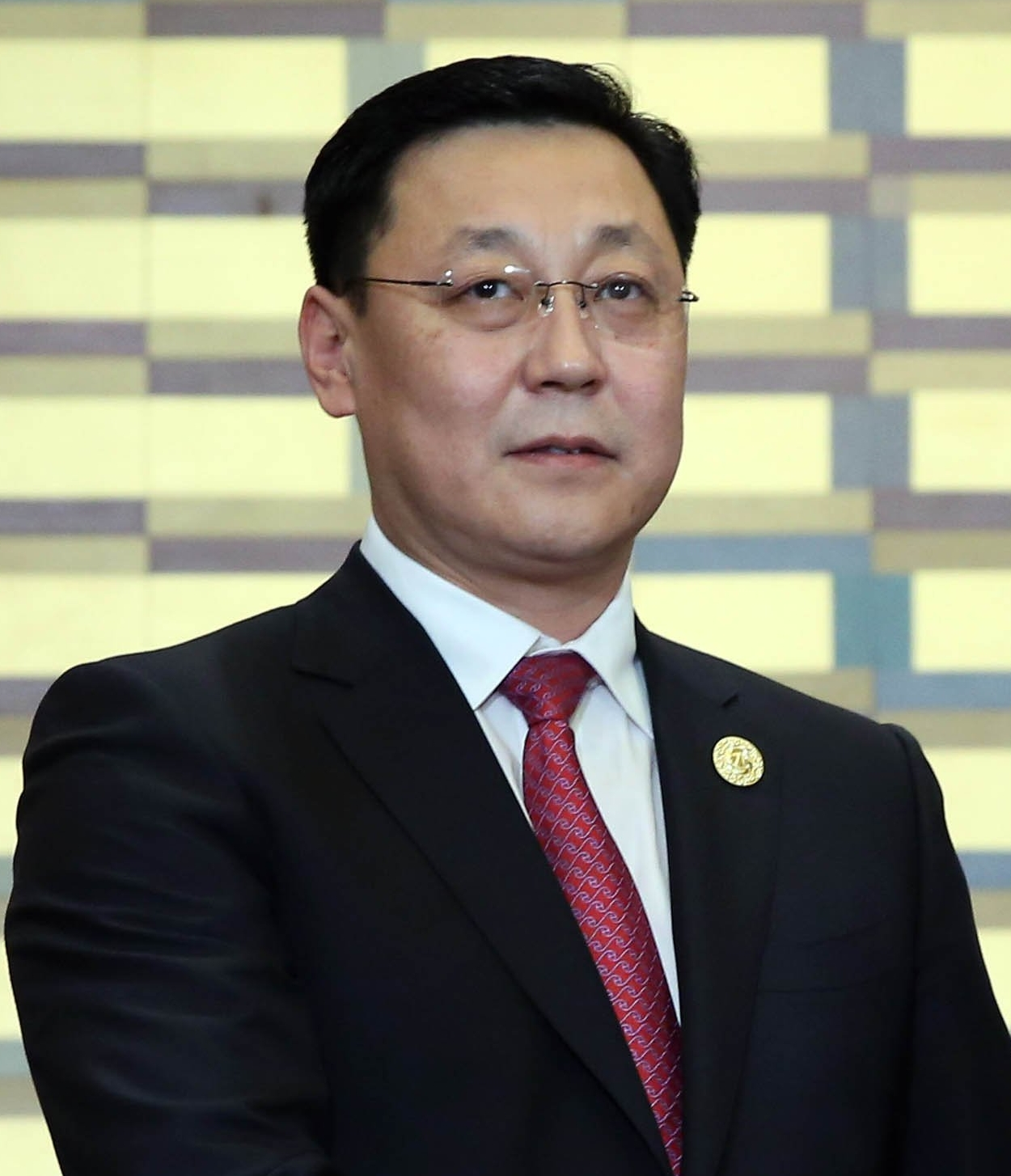
- Erdenebat in 2017

29th Prime Minister of Mongolia
- In office 7 July 2016 – 4 October 2017
- President: Tsakhiagiin Elbegdorj; Khaltmaagiin Battulga
- Preceded by: Chimediin Saikhanbileg
- Succeeded by: Ukhnaagiin Khürelsükh

Minister of Finance
- In office 21 November 2014 – 8 September 2015
- Prime Minister: Chimediin Saikhanbileg
- Preceded by: Chultemiin Ulaan
- Succeeded by: Bayarbaataryn Bolor

Member of the State Great Khural
- In office 6 July 2012 – 30 June 2020
- Constituency: 19th, Selenge Province (2012–2016); 26th, Selenge Province (2016–2020)
- In office 18 March 2021 – 2 July 2024
- Constituency: 13th, Selenge Province

Governor of Selenge
- In office 2008–2012

Personal details
- Born: 17 July 1974 (age 52) Mandal, Selenge, Mongolia
- Party: Mongolian People's Party
- Children: 2 daughters and 1 son
- Education: National University of Commerce and Business; Mongolian University of Life Sciences
- Awards: Order of the Polar Star

Jargaltulgyn Erdenebat (Mongolian: Жаргалтулгын Эрдэнэбат; born 17 July 1974) is a Mongolian politician and a member of the Mongolian People's Party who served as the 29th Prime Minister of Mongolia from 7 July 2016 to 4 October 2017. He was ousted (42–31) from office by a parliamentary vote in September 2017, amid broader party discord and allegations of corruption.

In June 2020, he was imprisoned for abuse of power and sentenced to six years in prison, while he was simultaneously re-elected as a member of the State Great Khural. His sentence was overturned by the Supreme Court in early 2021, allowing him to serve his remaining MP term until 2024.

He also served as the deputy governor and governor of his home province, Selenge, from 2004 to 2005 and from 2008 to 2012. From the same province, Erdenebat was elected to parliament three times—in 2012, 2016, and 2020.

== Early life and education ==
Erdenebat was born on 17 July 1974 in Mandal District, Selenge Province. As the eldest son of a family of four, he completed his secondary education at Mandal's 10-year secondary school from 1981 to 1991. He graduated with a degree in economics from the National University of Commerce and Business (later merged with the National University of Mongolia) in 1995.

== Political career ==
Between 2004 and 2005, Erdenebat served as the deputy governor of Selenge Province. In 2008, he was appointed Governor of Selenge Province, a position he held until 2012.

In the 2012 parliamentary election, he won a seat in the State Great Khural from the 19th constituency in Selenge. After the resignation of Norovyn Altankhuyag in 2014, Erdenebat subsequently served as Minister of Finance from 2014 to 2015 as part of the coalition government led by Chimediin Saikhanbileg from the governing Democratic Party.

=== Prime Minister ===
He became the Prime Minister of Mongolia on 7 July 2016, after the Mongolian People's Party (MPP) swept the 2016 parliamentary election, winning 65 of the 76 parliamentary seats. He formed a "Professional Government" (Mongolian: Мэргэжлийн Засгийн газар) comprising 16 ministers and 13 ministries on 30 July.

A motion of no confidence was announced by 30 MPP lawmakers on 23 August 2017. The parliamentary vote came after the MPP's defeat in the 2017 presidential election and subsequent internal party politics between two camps led by deputy prime minister Ukhnaagiin Khürelsükh and parliamentary speaker Miyeegombyn Enkhbold. The 65 MPP legislators were effectively divided into 33 and 32. Erdenebat and his cabinet were ousted following a parliamentary vote on 7 September 2017. Of the 73 members of parliament, 42 voted against Erdenebat over corruption allegations. He remained as caretaker until 4 October, when he was officially succeeded by Khürelsükh, who also became the next chairperson of the MPP.

=== Imprisonment ===
He was imprisoned on accusations of abuse of power for illegally owning protected areas with special licenses on 16 June 2020, shortly after failing to pay a 10 billion MNT bail (then equivalent to US$4.02 million) issued by the court. Whilst in detention, he was re-elected as MP from the 13th Selenge constituency in the 2020 parliamentary election. He was sentenced to six years in prison for abuse of power and banned for six years from holding a government office on 6 July.

His sentence was overturned by the Supreme Court on 16 January 2021, allowing him to take the oath as an MP in the upcoming spring session of the State Great Khural. He was sworn in on 18 March, serving a full parliamentary term until July 2024.

Political offices
Preceded by Chimediin Saikhanbileg	Prime Minister of Mongolia; 2016–2017	Succeeded by Ukhnaagiin Khürelsükh
