= MNDP =

MNDP may refer to:

- Mongolian National Democratic Party (1992–1999), former political party of Mongolia
- Mongolian National Democratic Party (2005), political party of Mongolia
