= Norovyn Altankhuyag =

Prime Minister of Mongolia from 2012 to 2014

- Норовын Алтанхуяг
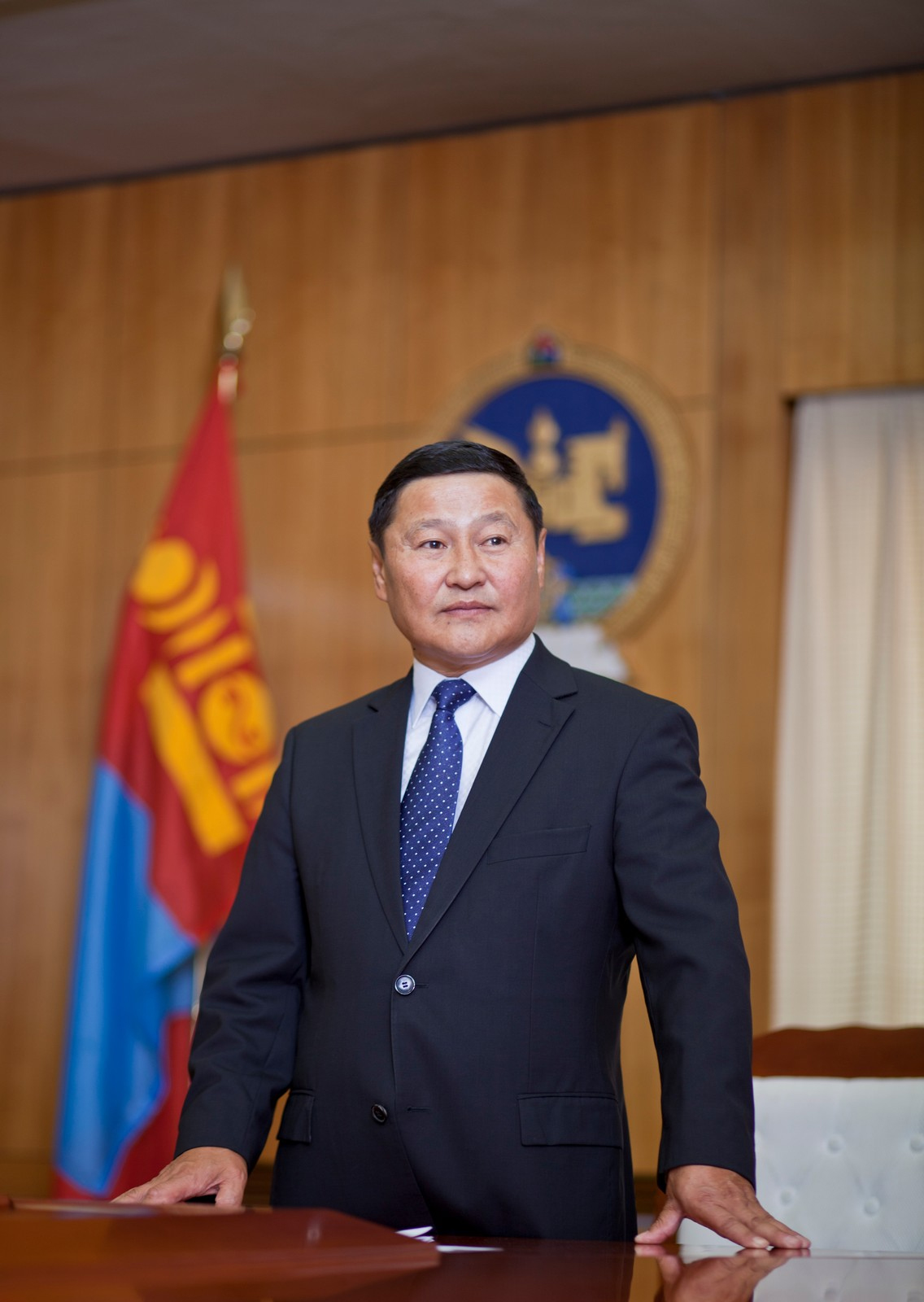
- Altankhuyag in 2014

27th Prime Minister of Mongolia
- In office 10 August 2012 – 5 November 2014
- President: Tsakhiagiin Elbegdorj
- Preceded by: Sükhbaataryn Batbold
- Succeeded by: Chimediin Saikhanbileg

Chairman of the Democratic Party
- In office 2 September 2008 – 14 November 2014
- Preceded by: Tsakhiagiin Elbegdorj
- Succeeded by: Zandaakhuugiin Enkhbold

Member of the State Great Khural
- Incumbent
- Assumed office 30 June 2020
- Constituency: 11th, Songinokhairkhan district (2024–2028); 20th, Orkhon Province (2020–2024)
- In office 2008–2016
- Constituency: Closed list (2012–2016); 26th, Songinokhairkhan district (2008–2012)
- In office 1996–2000
- Constituency: 69th, Songinokhairkhan district (1996–2000)

Personal details
- Born: 20 January 1958 (age 68) Ulaangom, Uvs, Mongolia
- Party: Democratic Party (since 2000)
- Other political affiliations: MSDP (1990–2000)
- Children: 1 son and 6 daughters
- Education: National University of Mongolia
- Profession: Politician, physician
- Website: Official website

Norovyn Altankhuyag (Mongolian: Норовын Алтанхуяг, IPA: [nɔrɔwíɴ áɬtʰəɴχʊɪq]; born 20 January 1958) is a Mongolian politician who served as the 27th Prime Minister of Mongolia from 2012 to 2014. He was elected five times as member of the State Great Khural, currently he is serving as MP for a second consecutive term since 2020. He was elected Chairman of the Democratic Party by the party's National Policy Committee, serving from 2008 to 2014.

Prior to his premiership, Altankhuyag served as First Deputy Prime Minister in the coalition government of the Mongolian People's Party and Democratic Party from 2008 to 2012. He served as the Minister of Agriculture and Industry between 1998 and 1999 and the Minister of Finance from 2004 to 2006. Following his electoral defeat in 2016, Altankhuyag served as senior advisor to the President of Mongolia, Khaltmaagiin Battulga, from 2017 until his resignation in early 2019.

== Early life and education ==
Altankhuyag was born in Ulaangom, the provincial capital of Uvs Province, on 20 January 1958. He attended Ulaangom's 1st secondary school from 1966 to 1976. Later in 1981, he graduated with a bachelor's degree in biophysics from the Faculty of Physics and Mathematics at the National University of Mongolia. After graduating, Altankhuyag was honored to remain a professor at the university. He worked as a professor of the Department of Biophysics at the Faculty of Physics and Mathematics from 1981 to 1990.

== Political career ==
During the 1990 Democratic Revolution, he was one of the pioneers in the pro-democracy youth movement against the Mongolian People's Revolutionary Party (MPRP). With his colleagues, he initiated the Democratic Socialist Movement. On 21 February 1990, the first meeting to establish the Mongolian Social Democratic Party (MSDP) was held. He was elected as a member of the party establishment commission, serving as party secretary from 1990 to 1992 and secretary general from 1994 to 1996. The MSDP formed the opposition Democratic Union Coalition with the Mongolian National Democratic Party for the upcoming elections in 1996.

As a member of the MSDP, Altankhuyag was elected from Songino Khairkhan district as a member of the State Great Khural (parliament) in 1996. The Democratic Union between the MSDP and MNDP secured a total of 50 seats, a historic landslide victory for the Mongolian opposition. Following the resignation of two prime ministers, Altankhuyag was appointed as the Minister of Agriculture and Industry by newly-appointed prime minister Janlavyn Narantsatsralt in 1998. He served in this role until 1999 when prime minister Narantsastralt resigned. He was later re-elected as the secretary general of the MSDP that same year.

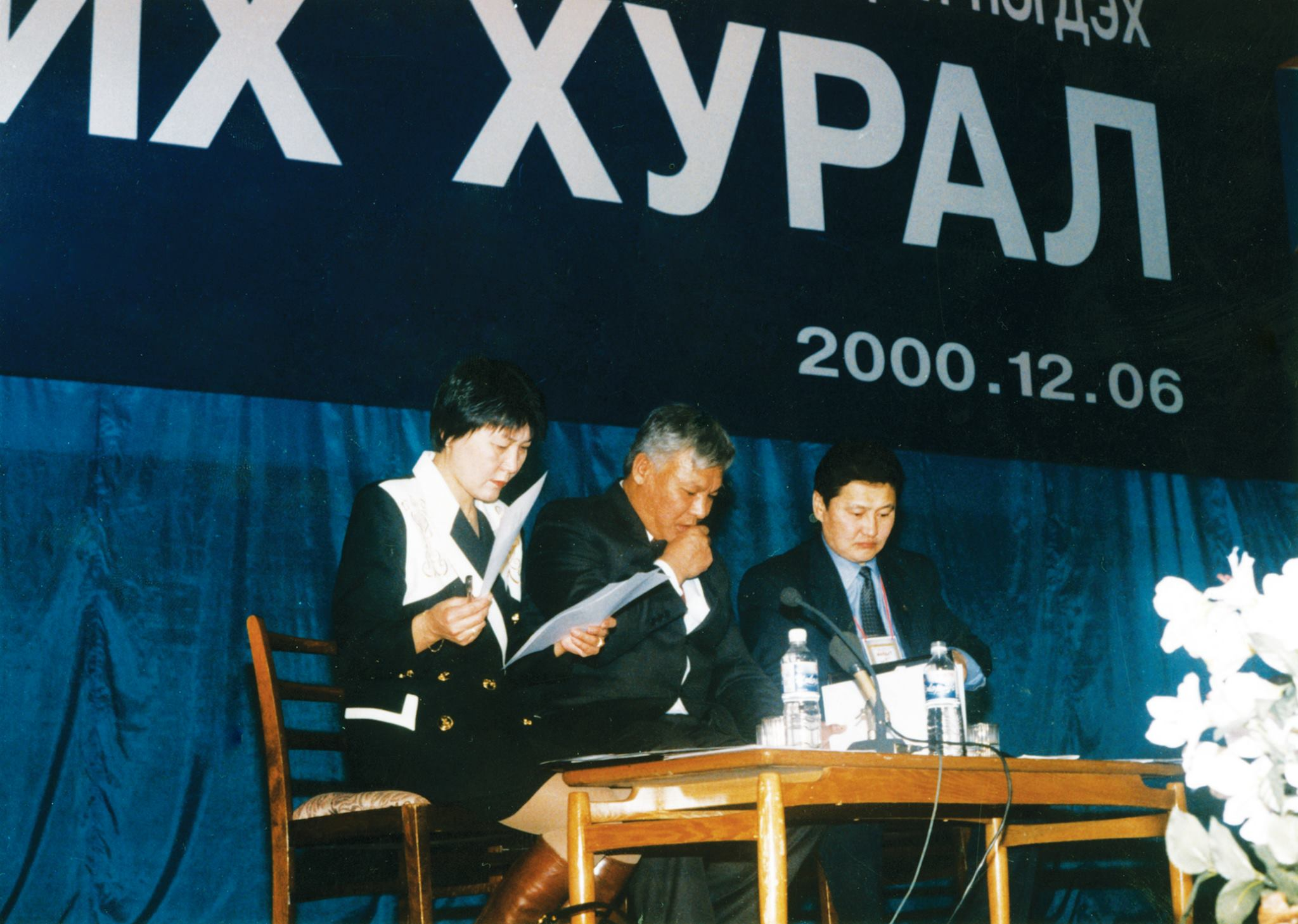
Altankhuyag as one of the chairs of the Convention on the foundation of the Democratic Party of Mongolia, held on 6 December 2000

In the 2000 parliamentary election, the MNDP and the MSDP, which ran independently, lost their majority to the MPRP. Altankhuyag was unseated by MPRP politician Nordovyn Bolormaa from his own constituency. The MNDP, the MSDP and three other parties merged to form the Democratic Party (DP) in December 2000.

Despite not holding a seat in 2004, Altankhuyag was appointed as Minister of Finance by Tsakhiagiin Elbegdorj, who led a coalition government between the DP and the MPRP. He served as finance minister from 2004 to 2006 when Elbegdorj's tenure was ended by the exitting of the MPRP.

In the 2008 parliamentary election, Altankhuyag was elected for the third time as member of parliament (MP). Following the party's controversial defeat in 2008, then-DP chairman Tsakhiagiin Elbegdorj resigned and Altankhuyag was elected as the DP's new leader on 30 August 2008. During his leadership, the DP launched the "Mongolian People—2020" action plan to strengthen the values of democracy and civil society, and entered a grand coalition government led by Sanjiin Bayar (MPRP). Altankhuyag became First Deputy Prime Minister and, for a day, served as acting prime minister when Bayar resigned due to health complications in 2009. He continued to serve as first deputy under the cabinet of Sükhbaataryn Batbold until January 2012 when the DP left the cabinet in the lead up to the upcoming election.

== Prime Minister of Mongolia (2012–2014) ==
Following the June 2012 legislative election, the DP secured 32 of the 76 seats in the State Great Khural, seven seats less than the majority threshold of 39 seats. Two seats were later gained in a re-election in 2012 and 2013. The State Great Khural appointed DP chairman Norovyn Altankhuyag as the 27th Prime Minister of Mongolia with 42 lawmakers voting in favour and 16 against on 9 August 2012.

Following lengthy negotiations with internal party factions and minor parties, the DP formed a coalition government, dubbed the "Reform Government" (Шинэчлэлийн Засгийн газар), with the Justice Coalition and the Civil Will–Green Party between 18-20 August 2012. With 19 ministers, Altankhuyag's cabinet consisted of 15 ministers from the DP, 4 from the Justice Coalition, and 1 from the CWGP. The first full cabinet meeting was held on 25 August 2012.

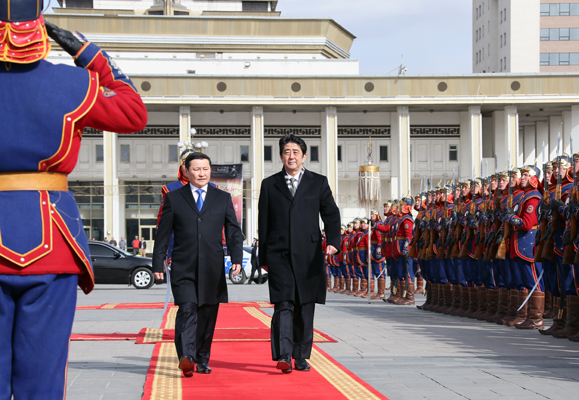
Altankhuyag receiving Japanese prime minister Shinzo Abe during Abe's state visit to Mongolia in March 2013.

Altankhuyag discussing with Russian president Vladimir Putin in May 2014.

Large-scale bonds, the most significant ones being the Chinggis Bond and the Samurai Bond, were introduced the government to fund its ambitious infrastructure projects. Disagreements between the state and Rio Tinto over various issues led to a halt in the second phase of the Oyu Tolgoi project in 2013. In addition to resource nationalism, global commodity price shocks amid inflation began to slowdown Mongolia's economic growth. During the start of his tenure, economic growth was 13.7% thanks largely to Oyu Tolgoi deposit. However, the country's growth fell to 6.3% in 2014 alongside a sharp decline in foreign direct investment.

Due to concerns of overspending and oversized cabinet, proposals for cabinet downsizing were announced by Altankhuyag in August 2014. Cabinet reshuffle was presented to the State Great Khural on 2 October 2014, which decreased the ministries from 16 to 11. However, political infighting within the DP led to the lack of internal consensus on the nominations for a prolonged period, during which 7 cabinet ministers were relieved.

As a result of no confidence vote, Altankhuyag and his cabinet was dismissed on 5 November 2014. Of the 66 legislators present, 8 from his own party and 28 from other parties voted against Altankhuyag while 30 voted in support of him. Altankhuyag was immediately succeeded by his deputy, Dendeviin Terbishdagva, who served as acting prime minister for 16 days until the appointment of Chimediin Saikhanbileg on 21 November 2014. Parliamentary speaker Zandaakhüügiin Enkhbold assumed the leadership in a NPC plenum on 14 November 2014.

== Post-premiership ==
Following his ousting, Altankhuyag remained as lawmaker for the DP. The party lost its political mandate to the MPP, which won a supermajority of 65 seats, in the 2016 parliamentary election. With just 2% decrease in the national vote, the electoral law, passed by the DP to promote two-party politics, ended up lossing them 25 of their 34 seats. Alongside Altankhuyag, other high-ranking party officials, including party chairman Enkhbold and sitting prime minister Saikhanbileg, were unseated. On 28 July 2017, he was appointed the presidential advisor on political policy by president Khaltmaagiin Battulga, elected from the DP in 2017. Altankhuyag served in this role until his early resignation in 2019.

Party infighting since the electoral defeat in 2016 led to a high amount of senior DP members to run independently in the 2020 election. Former prime minister Norovyn Altankhuyag successfully ran as an independent in Orkhon Province; becoming the only non-party lawmaker while the DP secured 11 seats with party chairman Sodnomzunduin Erdene unseated. Further party factionalism occurred in the lead up to the 2021 presidential election. With the party effectively divided into two major blocs, neither side could gain official recognition from the Supreme Court, and decide upon a presidential nominee. Altankhuyag was nominated by all 11 lawmakers of the DP minority from the faction headed by Odongiin Tsogtgerel, whilst former chairman Erdene was nominated by the other faction. Erdene's candidacy was accepted by the electional commission as the DP's presidential candidate. The decision caused supporters of Altankhuyag to protest and DP lawmakers to launch a hunger strike at Sükhbaatar Square in May 2021. Erdene would go onto receive 6% of the total ballot, the party's historic lowest, in June 2021. Excluding president Battulga, Altankhuyag consistently ranked as the party's second-most popular politician and most popular MP in a 2021 opinion poll.

Altankhuyag was re-elected to the State Great Khural from Songino Khairkhan in the 2024 parliamentary election. As member of the DP, he expressed his intentions to run for the party's primary for the 2027 presidential race on 26 February 2026. With a rating of 25.9%, Altankhuyag came first in an opinion poll about possible presidential candidates, conducted in September 2026.

== Personal life ==
Altankhuyag speaks Russian and English.

== Award ==
- Mongolia: Order of the Red Banner of Labour (2006)

== Electoral history ==
Election	Constituency	Party	Votes	Result
1996	69th, Songino Khairkhan	MSDP	7,565	Elected
2000	69th, Songino Khairkhan	MSDP	2,055	Not elected
2008	26th, Songino Khairkhan	Democratic	36,664	Elected
2012	Closed party list (#1)	Democratic	—N/a	Elected
2016	32nd, Uvs Province	Democratic	5,648	Not elected
2020	20th, Orkhon Province	Independent	19,595	Elected
2024	11th, Songino Khairkhan	Democratic	53,659	Elected

Party political offices
Preceded by Tsakhiagiin Elbegdorj	Leader of the Democratic Party; 2008–2015	Succeeded by Zandaakhüügiin Enkhbold
Political offices
Preceded by Sükhbaataryn Batbold	Prime Minister of Mongolia; 2012–2014	Succeeded by Chimediin Saikhanbileg
