= Mongolian National Democratic Party (2005) =

Political party in Mongolia

Mongolian National Democratic Party Монгол Үндэсний Ардчилсан Нам
- Abbreviation: MNDP (English); МҮАН (Mongolian)
- Chairperson: Bayanjargalyn Tsogtgerel
- Founder: Mendsaikhany Enkhsaikhan
- Founded: 19 May 2006
- Registered: 12 June 2006
- Split from: Democratic Party
- Headquarters: Ulaanbaatar
- Ideology: Conservatism; Mongolian nationalism
- Political position: Centre-right
- National affiliation: Justice Coalition (2012–2016); New Coalition (2020); National Coalition (2024–present)
- State Great Khural: 0 / 126

Party flag

Website
- mndp.mn
- Politics of Mongolia; Political parties; Elections; Formerly: New National Party; Үндэсний Шинэ Нам (2006–2011)

The Mongolian National Democratic Party (Mongolian: Монгол Үндэсний Ардчилсан Нам, abbreviated МҮАН or MNDP), known until 2011 as the New National Party (Mongolian: Үндэсний Шинэ Нам, ҮШН), is a political party in Mongolia that was established in 2006.

== History ==
=== Founding ===
In the 2004 parliamentary election, the Motherland Democratic Coalition (MDC), an opposition coalition led by the Democratic Party (DP), received 34 seats while three DP-affiliated independents were also elected. Without clear majority of 39 seats for the MDC and its rival, the Mongolian People's Revolutionary Party (MPRP), a power-sharing agreement between the two blocs formed a grand coalition government expected to change its premier every two years. Former prime minister, Tsakhiagiin Elbegdorj, was appointed as the 23rd Prime Minister of Mongolia in August 2004.

However, the MDC was voted to be dissolved by its own leadership in December 2004 due to the various disputes regarding issues such as the upcoming 2005 presidential election, economic policy of the grand coalition, and internal party consensus. The same month, former prime minister and then-leader of the DP, Mendsaikhany Enkhsaikhan, resigned and was succeeded by Radnaasümbereliin Gonchigdorj, who headed the dominant "Polar Star" faction which mainly consisted of his former Social Democrat colleagues. Factionalism within the former MDC remained prevalent and lack of clear opposition roles in parliament led to increasing disillusionment by several DP lawmakers and general public.

Regardless of the infighting, it was agreed by the DP that Mendsaikhany Enkhsaikhan would be the party's presidential candidate. In the 2005 presidential election, Enkhsaikhan lost to MPRP chairman Nambaryn Enkhbayar in a four-way race. His loss is attributed to vote splitting by minor party candidates and lack of campaign support from the DP leadership. Following the electoral defeat, Enkhsaikhan, Janlavyn Narantsatsralt (former prime minister), and two other DP lawmakers began to oppose the party line dominated by Gonchigdorj. In January 2006, these four dissident lawmakers voted against the government alongside the MPRP. The dissenting lawmakers joined the new coalition government headed by MPRP chair Miyeegombyn Enkhbold. Subsequently, Enkhsaikhan formally founded the New National Party (NNP) in mid 2006.

=== Early years ===
The New National Party held its first Party Congress on 19 May 2006 and was officially registered by the Supreme Court on 12 June 2006.

Party chairman Enkhsaikhan served as the government's Deputy Prime Minister from 2006 until November 2007, when the Enkhbold cabinet was forced to resign. During the same period, Mishigiin Sonompil served as Minister of Defence while Janlavyn Narantsatsralt served as Minister of Construction and Urban Development. However in mid November 2007, then-party chairman Narantsatsralt passed away in a car accident. Following the appointment of Sanjiin Bayar as succeeding prime minister, NNP member Tserendashiin Tsolmon served as Minister of Construction and Urban Development from 2007 to 2008.

In the 2008 parliamentary election, the NNP failed to win any seats in the State Great Khural, losing its parliamentary representation. During its third Party Congress on 14 September 2011, the NNP changed its name to the Mongolian National Democratic Party (MNDP), and re-elected Enkhsaikhan as chairman. Since 2011, the MNDP largely campaigned on anti-establishment and nationalist sentiment.

=== Justice Coalition ===
In 2012, the party formed the Justice Coalition with the Mongolian People's Revolutionary Party, a party established in 2010.

The coalition won 11 of 76 seats in the State Great Khural during the 2012 parliamentary elections, 4 of which were affiliated with the MNDP. The Justice Coalition formed a coalition government with the plurality DP after the elections. The gradual breakup of the Justice Coalition in May 2016 led to a total of three MNDP MPs joining the DP, and one joining the Sovereignty and Unity Party. The MNDP lost all its parliamentary seats before the 2016 parliamentary elections. The party did not run in the election but instead formally supported the DP, which lost 25 of its seats. On 1 December 2016, Enkhsaikhan resigned as chairman and was succeeded by party secretary Bayanjargalyn Tsogtgerel.

For the 2020 parliamentary elections, the MNDP was part of a broad political coalition called the New Coalition, which included many extra-parliamentary parties such as the Mongolian Republican Party, Citizens' Coalition for Justice Party, and Truth and Right Party. The coalition came in fourth, received 5.35% of the total vote, but failed to win any seats in the State Great Khural.

In December 2022, the MNDP merged into the DP, but this merger was not accepted by the Supreme Court, and therefore, the party was not officially deregistered. Many party members, including former chairman Enkhsaikhan, joined the DP.

=== National Coalition ===
In the 2024 parliamentary election, the MNDP became a founding member of the National Coalition alongside the Mongolian Green Party. The coalition, led by former Mongolian People's Party member Nyamtaishiryn Nomtoibayar, won 4 out of 126 seats in the newly expanded State Great Khural. However, no MNDP party members were elected into office.

== Leaders ==
- Mendsaikhany Enkhsaikhan (2006–2007)
- Janlavyn Narantsatsralt (2007)
- Tserendashiin Tsolmon (2008–2011)
- Mendsaikhany Enkhsaikhan (2011–2016)
- Bayanjargalyn Tsogtgerel (2016–present)

== Electoral history ==
=== State Great Khural elections ===
Election	Party leader	Votes	%	Seats	+/–	Position	Government
2008	Mendsaikhany Enkhsaikhan	60,357	1.70%	0 / 76	New	5th	Extra-parliamentary
2012 (Note: Run as part of the Justice Coalition.)	Mendsaikhany Enkhsaikhan	252,077	21.04%	4 / 76	▲4	▲3rd	Coalition government
2016	Bayanjargalyn Tsogtgerel	Did not contest		0 / 76	▼4	—	Extra-parliamentary
2020 (Note: Run as part of the New Coalition.)	Bayanjargalyn Tsogtgerel	213,812	5.35%	0 / 76	Steady	▼4th	Extra-parliamentary
2024 (Note: Run as part of the National Coalition.)	Bayanjargalyn Tsogtgerel	75,196	5.17%	4 / 126	▲4	4th	Opposition

== See also ==
- Politics of Mongolia
- List of political parties in Mongolia
