= Tes, Uvs =

District in Uvs Province, Mongolia

Coordinates: 50°28′42″N 93°35′53″E

Tes District Тэс сум ᠲᠡᠰᠰᠤᠮᠤ
- District
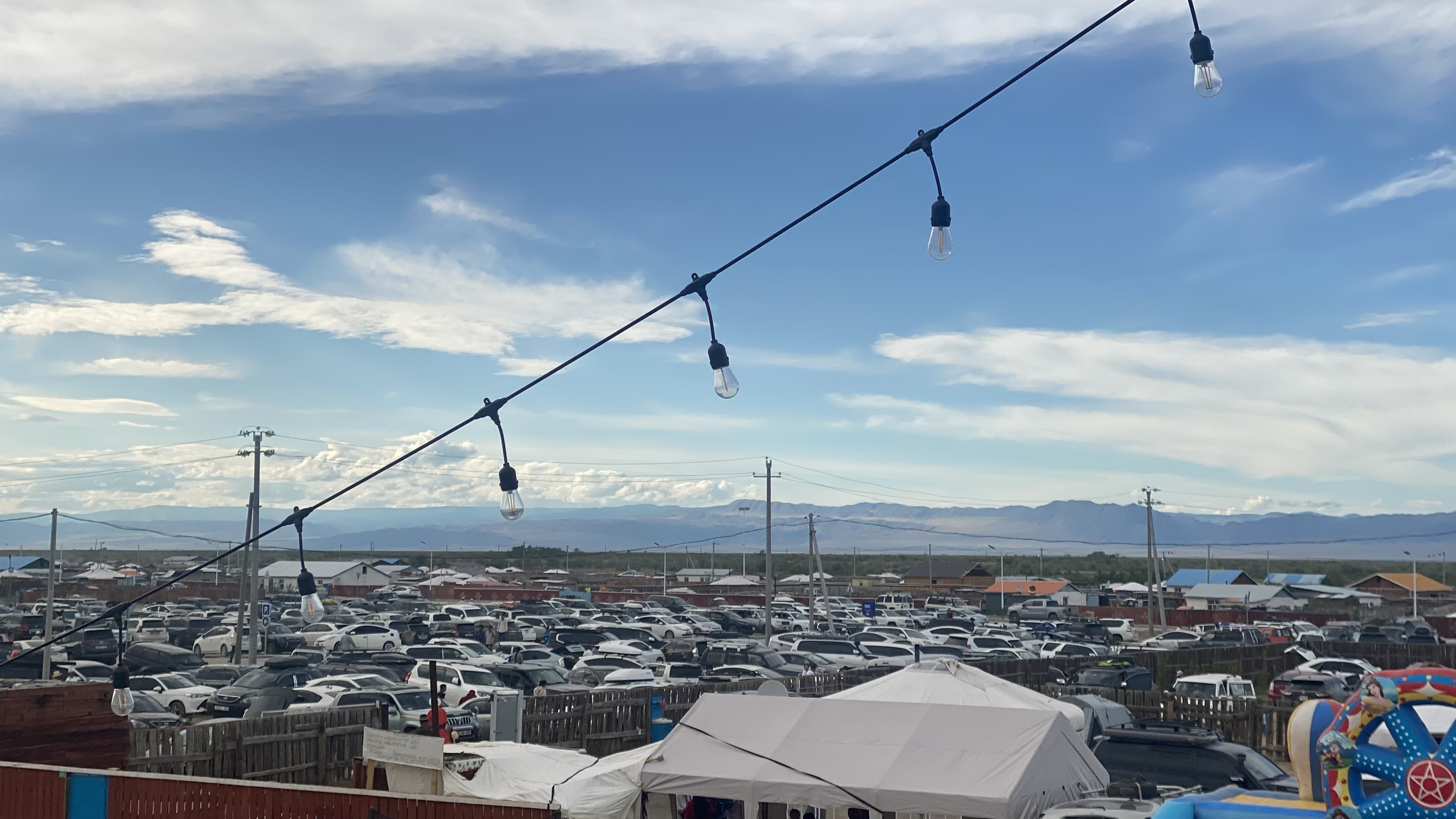
- Interactive map of Tes District
- Country: Mongolia
- Province: Uvs Province
- Established: 1924

Area
  - Total: 4,920 km^{2} (1,900 sq mi)
  - Land: 3,189 km^{2} (1,231 sq mi)

Population (2021)
  - Total: 5,211
- Time zone: UTC+7 (UTC + 7)

Tes (Mongolian: Тэс) is a sum (district) of Uvs Province in western Mongolia, and was established in 1924.

It is named after the Tesiin gol river that flows through the sum. Part of the area is covered with sand dunes. The sum's western end is the eastern shore of Uvs Nuur. Tes's population in 2021 was 5,211, down from 7,769 in 1990.

== Notable natives ==
- Mishigiin Sonompil, Minister of Defense (2006–2007)
