= Mönkhchuluuny Zorigt =

Mongolian politician

Mönkhchuluuny Zorigt (born September 15, 1964) is a member of the Mongolian State Great Khural for Sükhbaatar Province. Zorigt has served as Minister of Road and Transport in the cabinet of Prime Minister Chimediin Saikhanbileg and is a founder of the Munkhchuluun Foundation for Human Development.

== See also ==
- List of MPs elected in the Mongolian legislative election, 2012
