= Samurai bond =

Japanese Yen-denominated bond issued by foreign entities

A samurai bond is a yen-denominated bond issued in Tokyo by non-Japanese companies, and is subject to Japanese regulations. These bonds provide the issuer with an access to Japanese capital, which can be used for local investments or for financing operations outside Japan. Foreign borrowers may want to issue in Samurai market to hedge against foreign currency exchange risk. Another intention may be simultaneously exchanging the issue into another currency, in order to take advantage of lower costs. Lower costs may result from investor preferences that differ across segmented markets or from temporary market conditions that differentially affect the swaps and bond markets. NB: samurai bond can also refer to the government bonds issued by the Meiji government between 1873 and 1876 to former samurai in lieu of the hereditary stipends they received during the Tokugawa shogunate.

== History ==
Samurai Bond Market was opened in 1970 when the Japanese Ministry of Finance authorized supranational and highly rated foreign government entities to issue Samurai bonds within certain size and maturity restrictions. The market opened due to growing Japanese foreign currency reserves during late 60's. The exchange rate of the yen at that time was fixed at 360 yen per US dollar. It was revalued to 308 yen in 1971 and moved to a floating rate system in February 1973. To discourage foreign exchange pressure, the Japanese government decided to open capital market allowing foreign entities to issue yen-denominated bonds. However, at the time the market opened, only governmental entities could issue bonds. The Blue chip corporations were allowed to issue Samurai bond later in 1978.

The Asian Development Bank issued the first Samurai bond in November 1970. The issue amount was 6 billion yen with a 7-year maturity, and the bond was accepted very well in the market. At first, Asian Development Bank and other high credit supranational issuers were given an access priority to the market. To control stream of issuance, these special criteria were established. Those who were unable to meet eligibility criteria could finance yen through yen-denominated private placement bonds. They were permitted to target a restricted number of institutional investments, and terms and liquidity were under close control. In 1972 the first non-Japanese 10 billion yen bond was issued by Australia. In 1979, Sears made the first corporate Samurai bond issue for 20 billion yen. At that time, Samurai market gradually became accessible to more issuers through the alleviation of eligibility criteria, which now required minimum credit ratings, and through liberalization of new kinds of bonds. In addition, Samurai bonds provided an opportunity of issuing in two different currencies, as well as interest and principal were paid in either of these currencies.

=== Liquidation of rating requirement ===
In 1984, a liberalization step was taken to reduce the required minimum credit rating from double A to single A. In 1991, the minimum rating requirement for foreign governments, central banks, and foreign government-guaranteed institutions was lowered to triple-B. In January 1996, Samurai market eliminated the minimum requirement for credit rating, increasing private sector Share of the Samurai bond market.

=== Required standards ===
The eligibility criteria for issuing Samurai bonds were not loosened until April 1985. When examining applications from potential samurai issuers, the Ministry of Finance considered the tendency of the Japanese capital account balance and the liquidity in the country's economy. For the actual issuance of Samurai bonds, the Japanese Ministry of Finance set a quota per quarter year, and employed a queue system. Borrowers, if they agreed upon the terms of underwriting, entered the quota by rotation from the top of the queue. In 1998, the Ministry of Finance's close regulatory control was annulled.

== Deregulation of Samurai market ==
| Year | Deregulation measure | Remarks | Issues | Volume (Yen bil) |
|---|---|---|---|---|
| 1970 | Supranational issuance allowed | Asian Development Bank the first Samurai bond | 1 | 6 |
| 1972 | Sovereign issuance allowed Yen private placements by non- residents started | Australia becomes first sovereign Samurai issuer, Mexico and Brazil debut in 1973 | 6 | 85 |
| 1979 | Corporate issuance starts | Sears Overseas Finance NV issues the first corporate Samurai bond | 16 | 333 |
| 1984 | Public issuer rating criteria broadened to single A | Bank of China issues debut Samurai | 37 | 915 |
| 1986 | Financial parameters and single A rating as criteria for private issuers | Samurai issuance decreases as Euroyen issuance is widely liberalized | 21 | 590 |
| 1988 | Introduction of shelf registration | First issue by Greece, later to become one of the largest sovereign borrowers | 22 | 635 |
| 1989 | First reverse dual currency Samurai issue | Denmark issued the first reverse dual Samurai Bond - main forex exposure 34-structure to date (currently as PRDC) | 47 | 1,126 |
| 1991 | Sovereigns broadened to BBB, FRN issuance | First BBB-rated sovereign issue takes place in 1994 (Central Bank of Tunisia) | 34 | 681 |
| 1992 | Public sector broadened to BBB | Ankara Municipality issues first BBB public sector Samurai | 53 | 1,700 |
| 1994 | Private sector issuers broadened to BBB | PEMEX issues first BBB rated corporate Samurai | 55 | 1,163 |
| 1995 | First dual currency Samurai issue | Popularity of dual currency structure among retail investors as yen depreciates | 35 | 1,115 |
| 1996 | Lifting of issuance eligibility criteria, but financial institutions remain shut from the market | Brazil issues the first sub-investment grade bond in the Samurai market; market on the way to record in 1996 | 153 | 3,874 |
| 1996 | Foreign non-banks allowed to issue for purposes other than lending | FMCC issues Samurai bond as the first non-bank issuer | | |
| 1997 | Samurai issuance by overseas commercial banks liberated | Citicorp becomes first commercial bank to issue a Samurai | 85 | 2,123 |
| 1998 | Issuance of Nikkei-linked Samurai bonds liberalized | No issuance so far | 14 | 205 |
| 1999 | Foreign non-bankers allowed to issue for general finance purposes | Associates debut in 1999, Household Finance - 7 issues since 2000 | 10 | 661 |
| 2003 | Single A and higher rated foreign non-sovereigns not listed at TSE eligible for shelf registration | Several corporations have already taken advantage of the measure | 27 | 641 |

== Advantages and disadvantages of Samurai bonds for investors ==
=== Advantages ===
- Samurai bonds provide access to a diversified and deep pool of capital.
- Samurai bonds have relatively lower interest rates.
- Japanese institutional investors can easily invest in Samurai bonds because they are issued in Japan.
- Samurai bonds do not have to be left in the custody of securities companies or other institutions.
- As for Japanese institutional investors, foreign firms are very popular because of their high name recognition and good investment rating; as many of these funds are very conservative, they prefer to invest in larger companies with international presence.
- Japanese market is not subject to the same variations and market swings as the U.S. and European markets, giving companies an alternative financing source during economic downturns.

=== Disadvantages ===
- Samurai bond market has high tax rates and an unclear fiscal environment.
- Lack of a constant policy remains a serious concern of US-based companies.
- Lack of flexibility of issuance terms and conditions that create restrictions to use bonds.
- Companies that have issued samurai bonds have found high administrative burdens placed upon issuing companies.
- Complicated issuing procedures and high taxes have made Samurai bond market less attractive than European markets, and experience slow growth.

== See also ==
- Government debt
- Interest
- Risk
