= Luvsangiin Erdenechimeg =

Mongolian politician

- Лувсангийн Эрдэнэчимэг
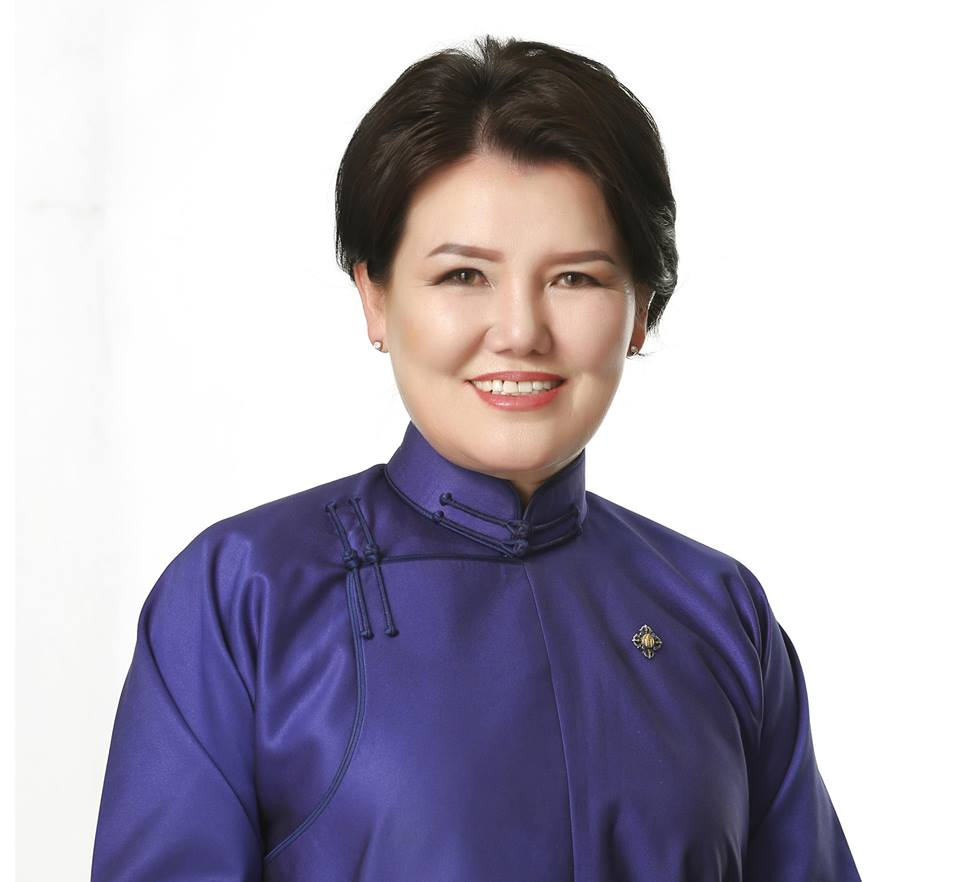

Member of State Great Khural
- In office July 2012 – July 2016

Personal details
- Born: 1967 (age 58–59) Ulaanbaatar, Mongolia
- Party: Democratic Party

Luvsangiin Erdenechimeg (Mongolian: Лувсангийн Эрдэнэчимэг; born 1967) is a Mongolian businesswoman and politician.

== Biography ==
Erdenechimeg was born in Ulanbaatar in 1967. In 1990, she studied genetics at the Faculty of Biology at Sofia University, where she obtained a master's degree nine years later. She then graduated from the School of Law at the National University of Mongolia in 2001.

Erdenechimeg served as a Member of State Great Khural from 2012 to 2016. As a member of the State Great Khural, she headed the women's caucus. She was elected when there was a 30% requirement for women to be members of parliament. The proportion was lowered to 20% in 2016.

Erdenechimeg is married with three children.
