= Dendeviin Terbishdagva =

Mongolian politician

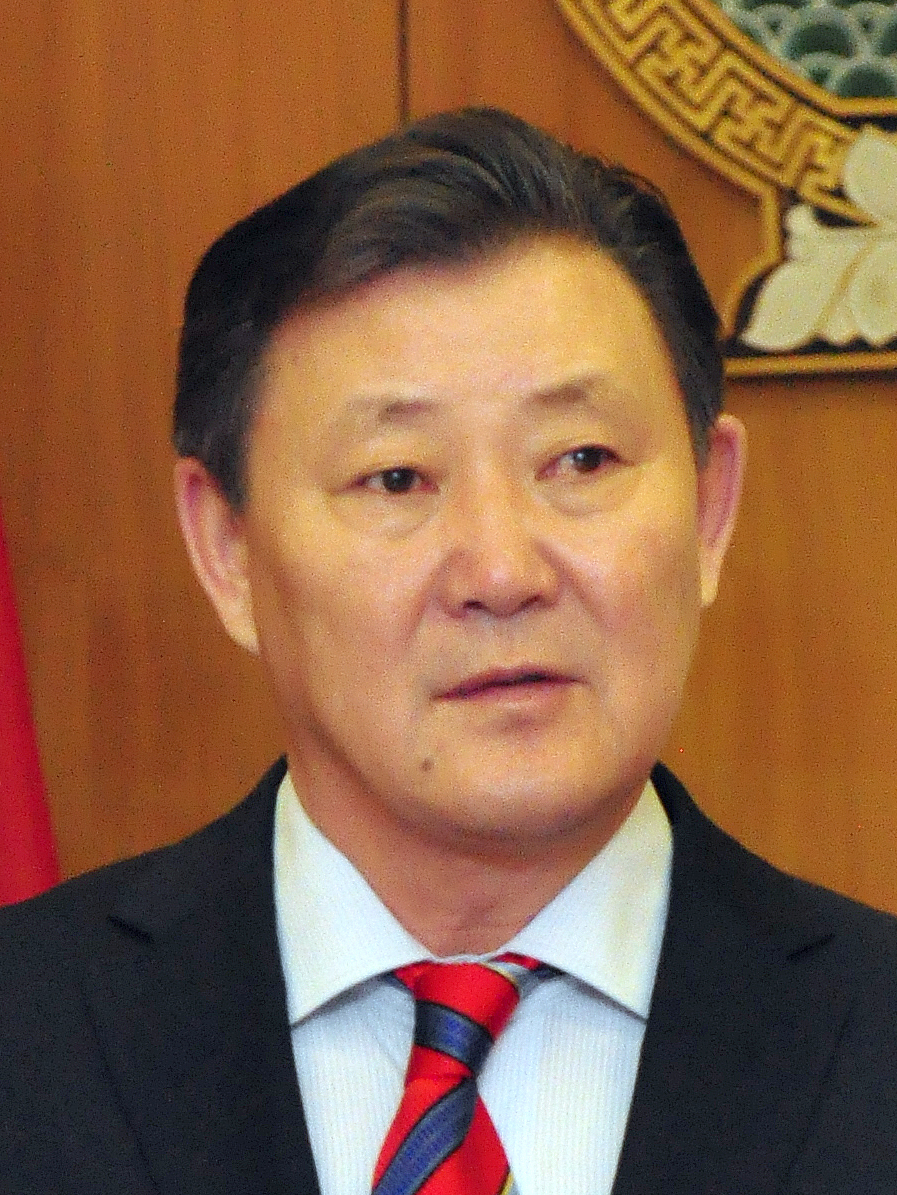

Acting Prime Minister of Mongolia
- In office 5 November 2014 – 21 November 2014
- President: Tsakhiagiin Elbegdorj
- Preceded by: Norovyn Altankhuyag
- Succeeded by: Chimediin Saikhanbileg

Deputy Prime Minister of Mongolia
- In office August 2012 – November 2014
- President: Tsakhiagiin Elbegdorj

Minister of Food, Mongolia
- In office 2004–2007
- President: Natsagiin Bagabandi Nambaryn Enkhbayar

Dendeviin Terbishdagva (Mongolian: Дэндэвийн Тэрбишдагва) is a politician from Mongolia who served as Acting Prime Minister of Mongolia in November 2014 and Deputy Prime Minister of Mongolia from August 2012 to November 2014.

== Career ==
Terbishdagva served as Deputy Minister of Food and Agriculture from 2000 to 2002. From 2002 to 2004, he was Ambassador to Germany. He was elected member of the State Great Khural in 2004 and served as Minister of Food and Agriculture until 2007.
