= Mishigiin Sonompil =

Mongolian politician

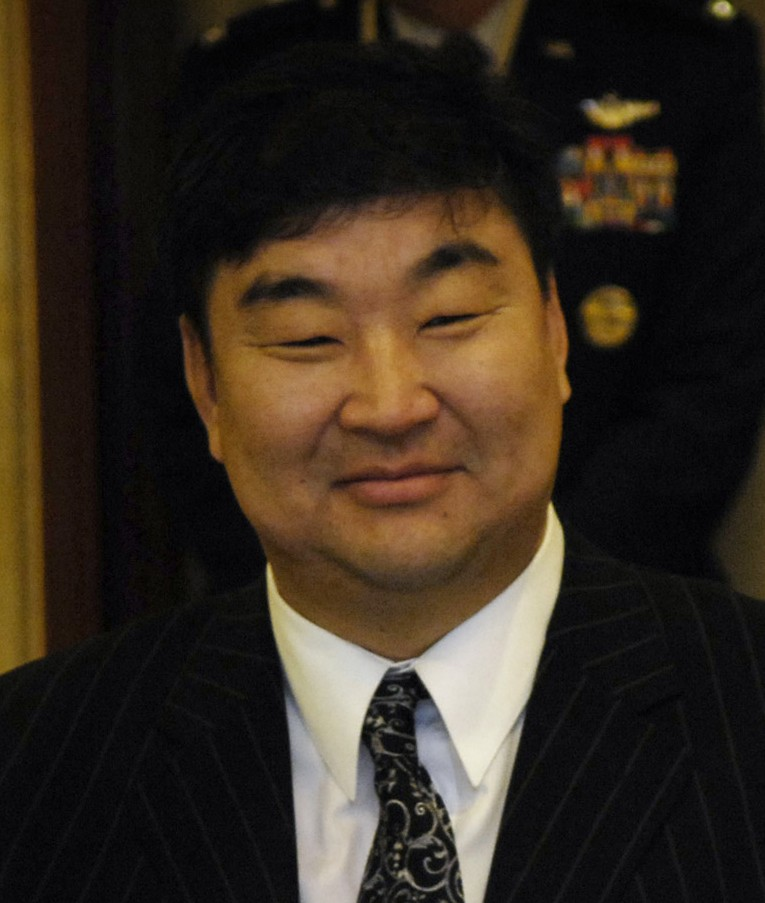
- Mishigiin Sonompil at the Shangri-La Dialogue in Singapore June 3, 2007

Minister for Defense of Mongolia
- In office January 2006 – 22 December 2007
- President: Nambaryn Enkhbayar
- Prime Minister: Miyeegombyn Enkhbold

Personal details
- Born: November 27, 1965 (age 60) Tes sum, Uvs Aimag, Mongolian People's Republic

Mishigiin Sonompil (Mongolian: Мишигийн Сономпил; born 1965) is a Mongolian politician who was Mongolia's Minister for Defense from January 2006 to December 2007.

== Early life and education ==
Mishigiin Sonompil was born in Tes sum, Uvs Aimag (province). He finished from the ten year General Educational School of Darkhan-Uul Aimag in 1984. He graduated from the command class of Defense University of Mongolia in 1988. He worked as a staff sergeant in the military unit of 167th Division of the Mongolian People's Army from 1988 to 1990, and in the Educational Unit of the 150th Division in 1990–1991.

== Business career ==
From 1994, Sonompil began to work as a manager at his brother Mishigiin Chimedtseren's private company "Zaluu Mongol" and Sonompil took the position of the corporate president in 1997. Sonompil worked as a corporate president until he was elected as a Member of Parliament in 2004.

== Political career ==
Sonompil's political career began when his Parliamentary Member brother Mishigiin Chimedtseren died in a deltaplane accident in 1997. He ran as an MP candidate from the Democratic Union Coalition, to fill in his died brother's position, but he was unsuccessful in both the 1997 and 2000 elections. In 2004, Sonompil ran for the third time for the elections from the Democratic Party, and this time he was elected as a Member of Parliament.

However, in January 2006 he voted with the former communist MPRP members against the coalition government of Tsakhiagiin Elbegdorj. He did so in spite of a decision of the Democratic Party's Directing Board. The Party's Main Legal Committee therefore cancelled Sonompil's membership in February 2006. In the new government under Miyeegombyn Enkhbold of MPRP, Mishigiin Sonompil was awarded the role of Minister of Defense.

== Memberships ==
- National President of Mongolia's Youth Chamber from 2000
- Chairman of the provincial council of Darkhan-Uul province
- Board Member of Mongolia's Volleyball Union
- Leading Member of Mongolia's Autosport and Tourism Union
