= Resource nationalism =

Asserting control over local resources

Resource nationalism is the tendency of people and governments to assert control over natural resources located within their territory. As a result, resource nationalism conflicts with the interests of multinational corporations.

The approach of peak oil during price fluctuation leads many governments to take ownership or control of fossil fuel reservoirs for strategic and economic reasons. Resource nationalism applies to resources such as metals, and in less developed nations, mining investments.

It is mainly enforced as an economic policy in an authoritarian or populist style by governments that rely on state ownership or control of natural resources located within their territories to advance political, social or industrial objectives. This emphasizes that resources belong to the people of the country in question first and foremost, and for some resource nationalists, that state employment is the best manager of resources against privatization.

A recent tide of resource nationalism appeared during the period of economic liberalisation in Latin America in the 1990s, with populations and governments looking for independence of the country in terms of export and resources. An example includes the Cochabamba Water War, a series of protests against privatization of the city's water supply that took place in Bolivia. As a result, less than six months later the government cancelled the contract.

Governments that have adopted elements of resource nationalism include Bolivia under Evo Morales, Argentina under Cristina Fernández de Kirchner, and Venezuela under Hugo Chávez.

== See also ==
- Economic nationalism
- "It's Scotland's oil"
- Georgism
