= Cabinet of Gombojavyn Zandanshatar =

21st Government of Mongolia

- 21st Cabinet of Mongolia
- 18 June 2025 – 4 April 2026
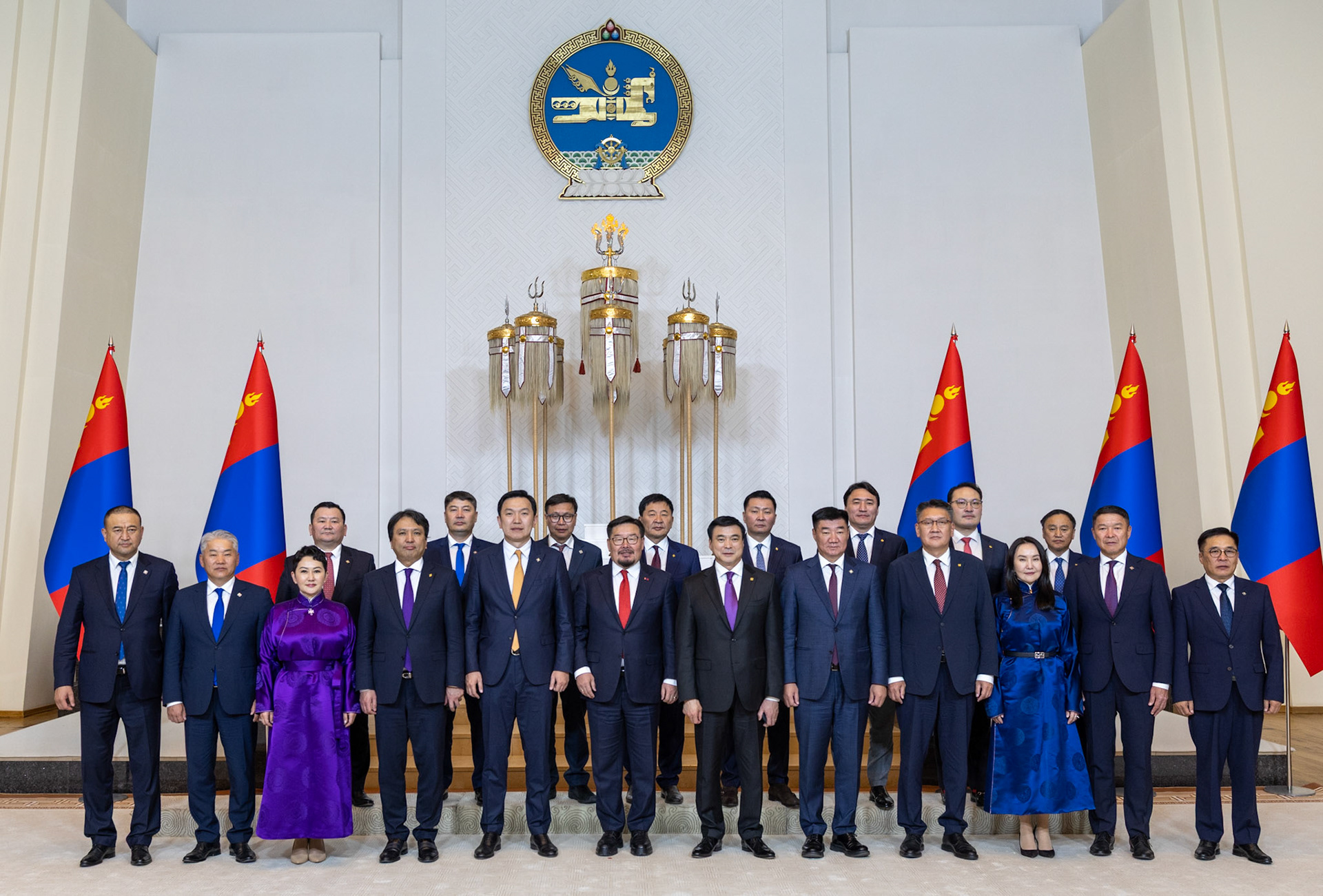
- Zandanshatar's cabinet in June 2025
- Date formed: 18 June 2025
- Date dissolved: 4 April 2026

People and organisations
- President: Ukhnaagiin Khürelsükh
- Prime minister: Gombojavyn Zandanshatar
- Deputy: Jadambyn Enkhbayar; Togmidyn Dorjkhand; Khassuuriin Gankhuyag
- No. of ministers: 19 (Note: Does not include the Prime Minister.)
- Ministers removed: 4 dismissed
- Member parties: Mongolian People's Party; HUN Party; Civil Will–Green Party
- Status in legislature: Coalition government 80 / 126 (63.5%) (Note: At commencement.)
- Opposition parties: Democratic Party; National Coalition

History
- Election: 2024 parliamentary election
- Legislature terms: 9th State Great Khural
- Predecessor: Oyun-Erdene II
- Successor: Uchral

The Cabinet of Gombojavyn Zandanshatar (Mongolian: Гомбожавын Занданшатарын Засгийн газар) was the 21st Government of Mongolia during the 9th legislative session of the State Great Khural. It succeeded the previous cabinet led by Luvsannamsrain Oyun-Erdene on 18 June 2025, and was succeeded by the cabinet of Nyam-Osoryn Uchral on 4 April 2026.

During the 2025 anti-government protests, the previous prime minister Oyun-Erdene resigned after losing a motion of confidence on 3 June 2025. The Mongolian People's Party, the majority party in the State Great Khural, during its Party Conference on 9 June, nominated former speaker of parliament, Gombojavyn Zandanshatar, to succeed Oyun-Erdene. Subsequently, on 13 June, he was voted unanimously by the State Great Khural as the next prime minister of Mongolia. Later on 18 June, he unveiled a new coalition government, composed of the ruling Mongolian People's Party, the HUN Party, and the Civil Will–Green Party. The cabinet consisted of a total of 19 ministers (excluding the prime minister) and 15 ministries, which is a slight decrease from the previous cabinet, which had 20.

The second-largest party in the State Great Khural, the Democratic Party, was expelled from the coalition government prior to May.

== Government formation ==
The State Great Khural elected (108-9) former Chairman of the State Great Khural and Chief of Staff of the Office of the President, Gombojavyn Zandanshatar, in the early hours of June 13.

Ballot	Candidate	Votes		Proportion
1st Ballot	Gombojavyn Zandanshatar (MPP)	Yes	108	85.71%
1st Ballot	Gombojavyn Zandanshatar (MPP)	No	9	7.14%
1st Ballot	Gombojavyn Zandanshatar (MPP)	Absent	9	7.14%
Gombojavyn Zandanshatar elected as Prime Minister of Mongolia.

On 17 June, the structure of the new cabinet was discussed during the Board Meeting of the MPP. Three national committees – the 20-Minute City National Committee, the National Committee for Port Revitalization, and the National Monitoring and Evaluation Committee – from the previous cabinet of Oyun-Erdene were dissolved. Moreover, it was stated that the HUN Party would remain as a coalition partner, and the National Coalition (NC) and Civil Will–Green Party (CWGP) were invited to the new coalition government. The CWGP accepted the invitation while the NC did not respond. The same day, Prime Minister Zandanshatar presented his cabinet nominees to President Ukhnaagiin Khürelsükh for appointment.

The next day, on 18 June, the State Great Khural appointed and swore in 19 ministers, 10 of whom had their terms renewed.

== Composition ==
Party	Ministers	Percentage
Mongolian People's Party	16	84%
HUN Party	2	11%
Civil Will–Green Party	1	5%
Total	19	100%

№	Office(s)	Portrait	Minister Constituency	Party	Took office	Left office
1	Prime Minister		Gombojavyn Zandanshatar (Not elected to the State Great Khural)	MPP	13 June 2025	30 March 2026
2	First Deputy Prime Minister of Mongolia and Minister of Economy and Development		Nyam-Osoryn Uchral; MP for 10th Chingeltei, Sükhbaatar	MPP	18 June 2025	20 November 2025
2	First Deputy Prime Minister of Mongolia and Minister of Economy and Development		Jadambyn Enkhbayar; MP for 5th Darkhan-Uul, Selenge, Töv Province	MPP	25 November 2025	4 April 2026 (renewed)
3	Deputy Prime Minister and Head of the National Emergency Commission		Sainbuyangiin Amarsaikhan; MP for 13th Bagakhangai, Baganuur, Nalaikh District	MPP	29 January 2021 (renewed on 18 June 2025)	29 October 2025 (dismissed)
3	Deputy Prime Minister and Head of the National Emergency Commission		Khassuuriin Gankhuyag; MP for 9th Bayangol District	MPP	12 November 2025	4 April 2026
4	Deputy Prime Minister		Togmidyn Dorjkhand; Party list	HUN	10 July 2024 (renewed on 18 June 2025)	4 April 2026 (renewed)
5	Chief Cabinet Secretary		Sandagiin Byambatsogt; MP for 2th Govi-Altai, Zavkhan, Khovd, Uvs Province	MPP	18 June 2025	4 April 2026
6	Minister of Foreign Affairs		Batmönkhiin Battsetseg; MP for 1st Arkhangai, Bayankhongor, Övörkhangai Province	MPP	29 January 2021 (renewed on 18 June 2025)	4 April 2026 (renewed)
7	Minister of Finance		Boldyn Javkhlan; MP for 5th Darkhan-Uul, Selenge, Töv Province	MPP	29 January 2021 (renewed on 18 June 2025)	4 April 2026
8	Minister of Justice and Internal Affairs		Lkhagvyn Mönkhbaatar; MP for 4th Bulgan, Khövsgöl, Orkhon Province	MPP	18 June 2025	24 October 2025
8	Minister of Justice and Internal Affairs		Battömöriin Enkhbayar; MP for 8th Bayanzürkh District	MPP	24 October 2025	4 April 2026
9	Minister of Mining and Heavy Industry		Gongoryn Damdinnyam; MP for 5th Darkhan-Uul, Selenge, Töv Province	MPP	18 June 2025	4 April 2026 (renewed)
10	Ministry of Defense		Dambyn Batlut; MP for 4th Bulgan, Khövsgöl, Orkhon Province	MPP	18 June 2025	4 April 2026 (renewed)
11	Minister of Environment and Climate Change		Batyn Batbaatar; Party list	CWGP	18 June 2025	4 April 2026
12	Minister of Education		Pürevsürengiin Naranbayar; MP for 8th Bayanzürkh District	HUN	10 July 2024 (renewed on 18 June 2025)	4 April 2026
13	Minister of Family, Labor and Social Protection		Telukhany Aubakir; MP for 3rd Bayan-Ölgii Province	MPP	18 June 2025	4 April 2026 (renewed)
14	Minister of Road and Transport Development		Borkhüügiin Delgersaikhan; MP for 7th Govisümber, Dornogovi, Dundgovi, Ömnögovi Province	MPP	10 July 2024 (renewed on 18 June 2025)	4 April 2026 (renewed)
15	Minister of Culture, Sports, Tourism, and Youth		Chinbatyn Undram; MP for 5th Darkhan-Uul, Selenge, Töv Province	MPP	18 June 2025	4 April 2026
16	Minister of Construction, Urban Development, and Housing		Enkhtaivany Bat-Amgalan; MP for 8th Bayanzürkh District	MPP	18 June 2025	4 April 2026 (renewed)
17	Minister of Food, Agriculture and Light Industry		Jadambyn Enkhbayar; MP for 5th Darkhan-Uul, Selenge, Töv Province	MPP	10 July 2024 (renewed on 18 June 2025)	25 November 2025 (promoted)
17	Minister of Food, Agriculture and Light Industry		Myagmarsürengiin Badamsüren; MP for 6th Dornod, Khentii, Sükhbaatar Province	MPP	25 November 2025	4 April 2026
18	Minister of Digital Development, Innovation, and Communications		Enkhbayaryn Batshugar; MP for 11th Songinokhairkhan District	MPP	18 June 2025	4 April 2026
19	Minister of Energy		Battogtokhyn Choijilsüren; MP for 2th Govi-Altai, Zavkhan, Khovd, Uvs Province	MPP	2022 (renewed on 18 June 2025)	4 April 2026
20	Minister of Health		Jigjidsürengiin Chinbüren; MP for 8th Bayanzürkh District	MPP	18 June 2025	4 April 2026

== See also ==
- Government of Mongolia
- Prime Minister of Mongolia
