= Batyn Batbaatar =

Mongolian politician (born 1973)

- Батын Батбаатар
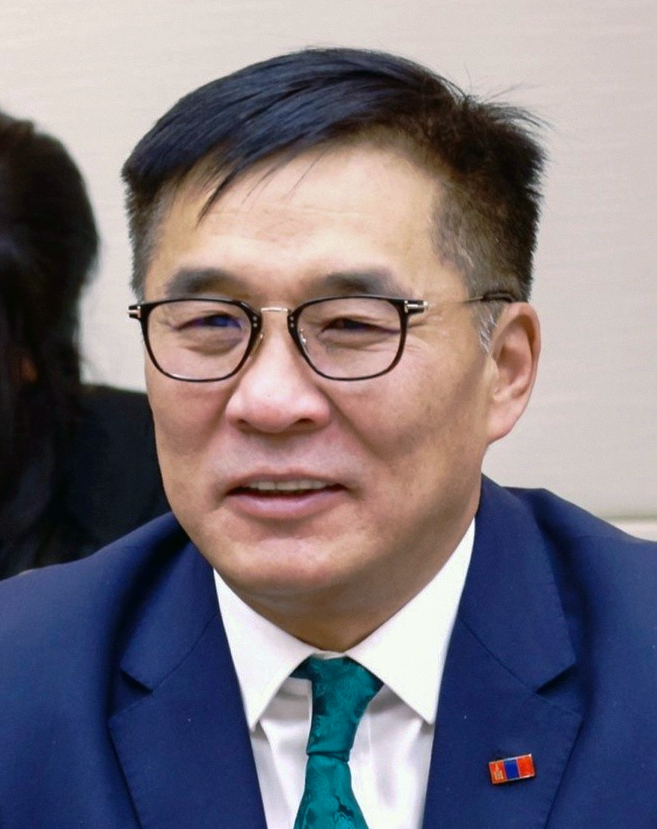
- Batbaatar in 2026

Minister of Environment and Climate Change
- In office 18 June 2025 – 4 April 2026
- Prime Minister: Gombojavyn Zandanshatar
- Preceded by: Saldangiin Odontuya
- Succeeded by: Tsendiin Sandag-Ochir

Member of the State Great Khural
- Incumbent
- Assumed office 2 July 2024
- Constituency: Closed list
- In office July 2004 – August 2008
- Constituency: 66th, Bayangol district

Chairman of the Civil Will–Green Party
- Incumbent
- Assumed office 5 June 2023
- Preceded by: Tserendorjiin Gankhuyag

Personal details
- Born: December 30, 1973 (age 52) Ulaanbaatar, Mongolia
- Party: Civil Will–Green Party (since 2016)
- Other political affiliations: Democratic Party (until 2016)
- Education: National University of Mongolia
- Profession: Politician, economist

Batyn Batbaatar (Mongolian: Батын Батбаатар; born 30 December 1973) is a Mongolian politician who was the Minister of Environment and Climate Change for the Zandanshatar cabinet between 2025 and 2026. A former member of the Democratic Party and current chairman of the Civil Will–Green Party, he was elected to the State Great Khural twice, now serving his non-consecutive second term since 2024.

== Early life and education ==
Batbaatar was born on 30 December 1973 in Ulaanbaatar, the capital city of the Mongolian People's Republic. He completed his secondary education at the 47th secondary school of Ulaanbaatar in 1991. He graduated with bachelor's and master's degrees in Economics from the National University of Mongolia (NUM) School of Economics in 1999 and 2000, respectively. In 2002, he completed a bachelor's in Law at NUM School of Law.

== Political career ==
Between 2003 and 2013, Batbaatar served as the Chairman of the Democratic Party (DP) in Chingeltei district of Ulaanbaatar. He was first elected to the State Great Khural from the 66th Bayangol constituency in the 2004 parliamentary election.

In the 2016 parliamentary election, due to disagreements with the party leadership, Batbaatar didn't run as a member of the DP. Despite officially not leaving, he submitted his candidacy documents as a member of the Civil Movement Party in late May. The General Election Commission didn't register his documents due to affiliation irregularities. Subsequently, after leaving the DP, he joined the Civil Will–Green Party (CWGP) in early June and ran in the 70th Bayangol constituency, where he later lost to the Mongolian People's Party (MPP) candidate.

On 5 June 2023, the then-chairperson of the CWGP, Tserendorjiin Gankhuyag, resigned and was succeeded by Batbaatar. He was officially registered as the party chairman by the Supreme Court in January 2024. The next year, during the 2024 parliamentary election, the CWGP won four seats in the expanded State Great Khural via proportional representation. Batbaatar, who ranked first in the party's closed list, was elected to parliament for the second time.

=== Minister of Environment ===
After the resignation of prime minister Luvsannamsrain Oyun-Erdene in June 2025, his successor, Gombojavyn Zandanshatar, unveiled a new coalition government comprising the MPP, the HUN Party, and the CWGP. Batbaatar was appointed as Minister of Environment and Climate Change on 18 June 2025, becoming the only CWGP cabinet minister.

For the 2027 presidential election, Batbaatar announced his intention to run for president as the CWGP candidate during a 26-year anniversary party conference on 9 March 2026, a move that was met with criticism from within the party. The same day, some party members separately held an extraordinary party session and elected MP Rinchindorjiin Batbold as the next chairperson. The party dispute went on for another three months until it was legally resolved on 2 July 2026, when the Supreme Court registered the party's new charter (previously rejected four times) and refused to register Batbold as chair, leaving Batbaatar as party chair.

Prime minister Zandanshatar resigned on 27 March 2026; his successor, Nyam-Osoryn Uchral, formed his cabinet, comprising the MPP, the HUN Party, and the National Coalition, on 4 April 2026. Batbaatar was subsequently succeeded by MPP lawmaker Tsendiin Sandag-Ochir.
