= 2025 Mongolian protests =

Anti-government protests in Mongolia

- Part of Gen Z protests in Asia
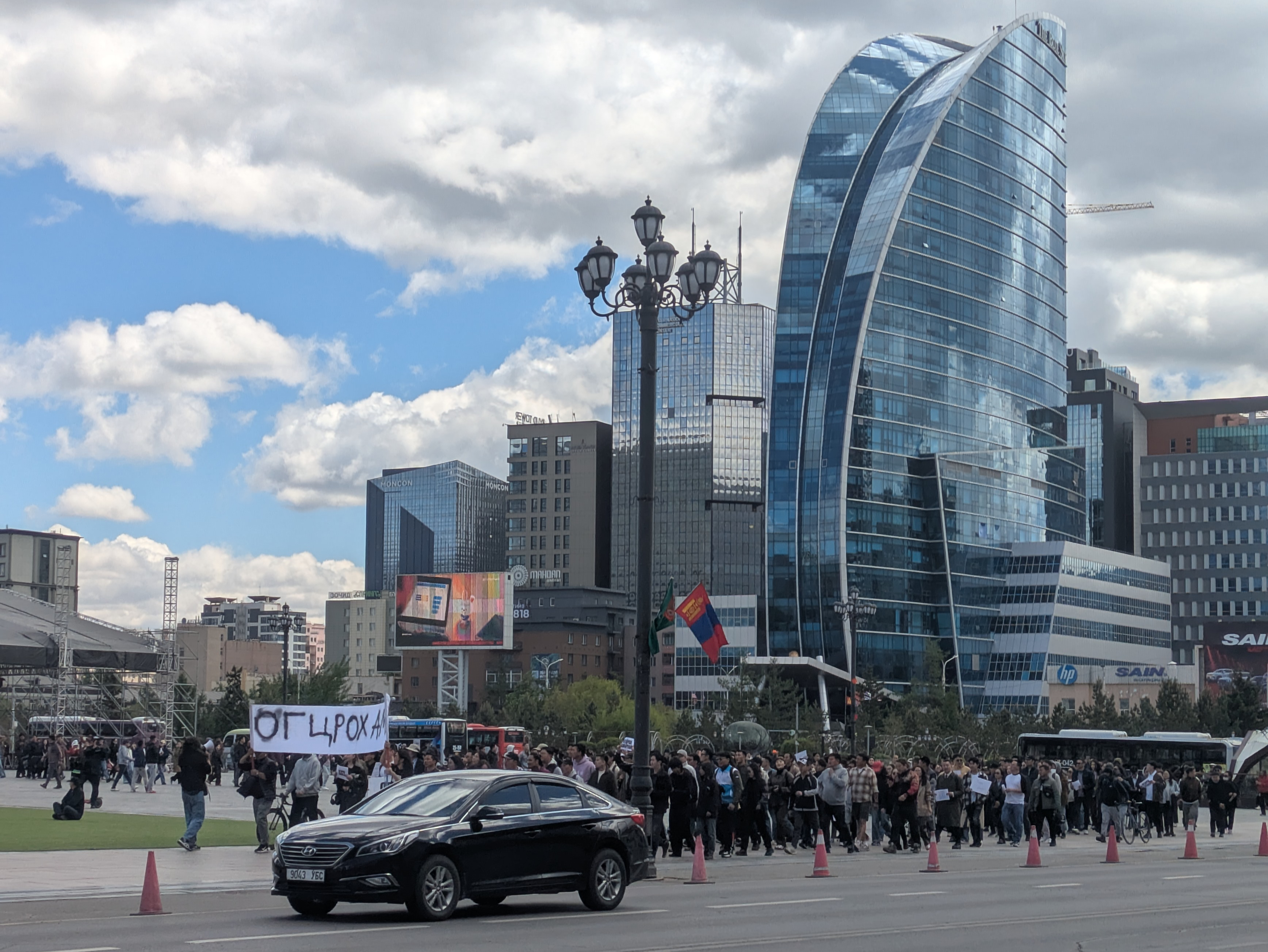
- Protesters at Sukhbaatar Square on 2 June
- Date: 14 May 2025 – 3 June 2025 (2 weeks and 6 days)
- Location: Ulaanbaatar, Mongolia
- Caused by: Dissatisfaction with the prime minister; Corruption; Economic crisis; Inflation
- Goals: Resignation of Luvsannamsrain Oyun-Erdene; Dissolution of the coalition government
- Methods: Demonstrations; Online activism; Open mic
- Result: Protests successful: 59,000 people signed a petition calling for the resignation of prime minister; Democratic Party expelled from the coalition government; Resignation of Luvsannamsrain Oyun-Erdene as the Prime Minister; Appointment of former Speaker Gombojavyn Zandanshatar as next prime minister on 13 June; New coalition government established between the Mongolian People's Party, HUN Party and the Civil Will–Green Party; Political and constitutional crisis in late 2025

Parties
Protesters: Youth activists	Government of Mongolia; Ministry of Justice and Internal Affairs; National Police Agency; Internal Troops; Mongolian People's Party; Counter-protesters

Lead figures
Non-centralised leadership	Luvsannamsrain Oyun-Erdene

On 14 May 2025, anti-government demonstrations began in Ulaanbaatar, the capital of Mongolia, following reports of extravagant spending by the son of Prime Minister Luvsannamsrain Oyun-Erdene. The protests, primarily led by young Mongolians, centered on broader concerns about government corruption, inequality, and the influence of political elites and their families.

Oyun-Erdene, who had formed a coalition government following the 2024 parliamentary election, denied wrongdoing and stated he would resign if any financial irregularities were found. The protests continued for over two weeks, prompting a realignment within the governing coalition and an eventual vote of no confidence. Analysts described the events as reflecting deeper political divisions, including internal tensions within the ruling Mongolian People's Party and debates over constitutional reform.

On 3 June, Oyun-Erdene resigned as prime minister after losing a vote of confidence in the State Great Khural, receiving support from only 44 members of parliament, 20 short of the 64 required.

== Background ==
On 11 January 2025, a demonstration organized by the Liberté party was held at Sukhbaatar Square in Ulaanbaatar, drawing hundreds of participants. Protesters called for the government's resignation over issues including air pollution, traffic congestion, poverty, corruption, taxation, and growing unemployment. The party stated that protests would continue until 22 January and submitted resignation proposals to 33 members of parliament.

Luvsannamsrain Oyun-Erdene was re-elected as prime minister in the 2024 parliamentary election after the Mongolian People's Party (MPP) won 68 of 126 parliamentary seats. Rather than governing alone, he formed a coalition government with the Democratic Party (42 seats) and the HUN Party (8 seats) to facilitate consensus on long-term economic reforms, including a proposed sovereign wealth fund and large-scale infrastructure projects. As of October 2025, Oyun-Erdene is the longest-serving prime minister in Mongolia since Nambaryn Enkhbayar.

Public frustration was sparked by social media posts made by the fiancée of Oyun-Erdeniin Temuulen, the prime minister's 23-year-old son, which featured luxury handbags, a high-end ring, and a Mercedes-Benz. The images prompted allegations that the prime minister's family was benefiting from wealth far exceeding the means of a civil servant, intensifying long-standing concerns over corruption and wealth concentration in Mongolia's resource-rich economy.

Although Oyun-Erdene had cultivated a reputation as a reform-minded leader seeking to challenge entrenched interests in the mining and banking sectors, the revelations prompted widespread criticism. Allegations that he was either aware of or had financed his son's lifestyle led to a petition calling for his resignation. The petition, signed by over 59,000 people, also cited high inflation and increasing restrictions on press freedom as contributing grievances. Oyun-Erdene stated that his son had not requested any financial support from him and that Mongolia's Anti-Corruption Agency was investigating the matter. He reportedly expressed willingness to resign without objection if the agency found any discrepancies in his financial disclosures.

== Protests ==
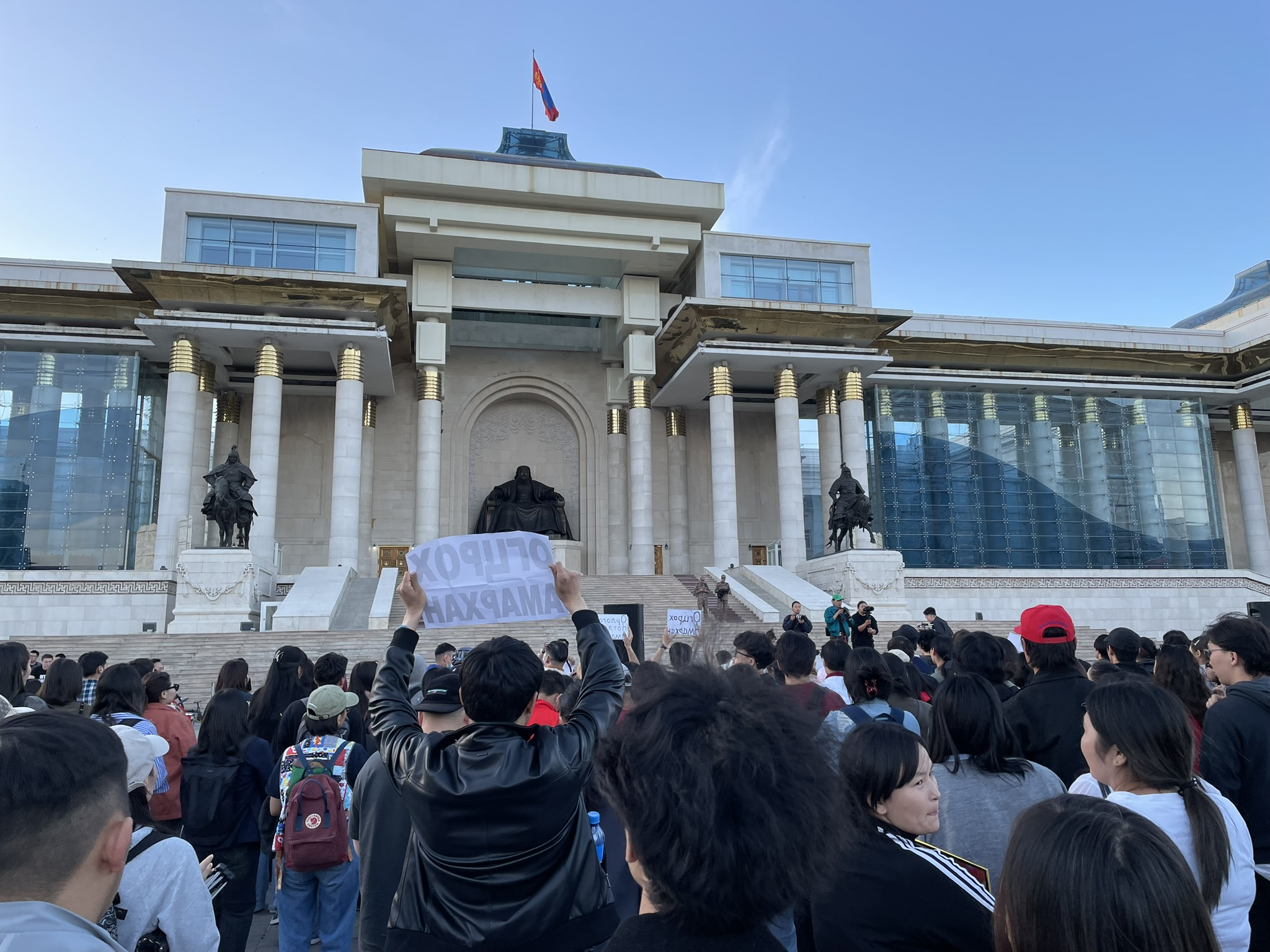
Protestors in front of the Government Palace on 29 May 2025.

The protests initially emerged as an uncoordinated expression of public frustration. Small but sustained peaceful demonstrations began in mid-May 2025, with young Mongolians gathering in Ulaanbaatar's Sükhbaatar Square to call for the resignation of the prime minister. Demonstrators expressed frustration over allegations of corruption involving the prime minister's family, alongside broader grievances related to inequality and government corruption. They demanded that he publicly disclose his sources of income and provide an explanation for the funding of the reported expenses. Over several consecutive days, protesters assembled outside the Government Palace, while counter-protesters, generally older in age, also took to the streets in support of the prime minister and expressed skepticism about the effectiveness of his resignation.

On 21 May, the MPP expelled the DP from the ruling coalition, citing a violation of the memorandum of understanding after several Democratic Party lawmakers expressed support for the ongoing protests. The move effectively dissolved the coalition less than a year after its formation. In response, the DP formally called on the MPP to issue a written explanation and a public apology for its abrupt removal from the coalition government without prior notice. Democratic Party chairman and Deputy Prime Minister Luvsannyamyn Gantömör stated that the dissenting legislators did not represent the party's official position. On 22 May, leaders of the three governing parties met to reassess the terms of their coalition agreement.

On 24 May, the protests entered their ninth day. On 26 May, organizers publicly presented a set of expanded demands, including:

- The resignation of Prime Minister Oyun-Erdene on grounds of political and moral responsibility;
- The dissolution of the coalition government and a rejection of forming any new coalition;
- A call to maintain constitutional stability by refraining from amendments to the Constitution.

On 27 May, government sources indicated that Oyun-Erdene was considering calling a vote of confidence, anticipated for the following week. In an effort to pressure parliamentarians to remove Oyun-Erdene, protesters called on all 126 MPs elected in June 2024 to speak out and represent the views of their constituencies.

Analysts highlighted a disconnection between Oyun-Erdene and the public during the protests, citing his delayed response, lack of direct engagement, and failure to address public distrust in the judiciary. While he emphasized policy achievements and stability, protesters viewed his actions as evasive and focused on preserving power. His refusal to meet demonstrators and delayed transparency fueled public frustration. On 2 June, the day before the vote, Oyun-Erdene defended his record in a parliamentary address, stating he had not been involved in state appointments, tenders, or loans, and instead had worked to expose such practices. He reiterated his commitment to transparency and anti-corruption efforts, and claimed that powerful vested interests were behind the protests seeking his ousting. Prior to his removal, Oyun-Erdene's Press Office released economic forecasts warning of potential instability if the coalition government were dissolved.

On 3 June, Oyun-Erdene resigned after losing a motion of confidence in the State Great Khural, with 44 MPs supporting him out of the required 64. Thirty-six opposed him, while the remaining 42 did not vote. 24 MPs of the Democratic Party walked out of parliament during the vote. He remained in office as a caretaker until a new prime minister was appointed within 30 days. Gombojavyn Zandanshatar (MPP) was nominated by President Ukhnaagiin Khürelsükh and confirmed as the next prime minister by the State Great Khural on 12 June. Zandanshatar was officially appointed and sworn in as the 32nd Prime Minister of Mongolia the next day on 13 June.

== Analysis ==
Commentators and political analysts noted that the protests and the resulting political crisis coincided with a power struggle within the ruling MPP. According to broadcaster and analyst Jargal DeFacto, some factions were using the controversy to advocate for constitutional changes that would allow President Ukhnaagiin Khürelsükh to seek a second term. The Constitution of Mongolia limits the president to a single six-year term.

Khürelsükh, a former prime minister and member of the MPP, previously faced criticism for foreign policy decisions, including inviting Russian President Vladimir Putin to Mongolia despite international legal obligations to detain him on war crimes charges under the Rome Statute, and attending the Victory Day celebrations in Moscow. Political economy analyst and columnist Bazarsurengiin Bolor-Erdene told The Diplomat that discussions about Mongolia potentially shifting to a presidential system were longstanding. She noted that excessive emphasis on defending the Constitution has, in her view, sidelined public interests and contributed to the power struggle among political elites amid the protests. Bolor-Erdene warned that if the standoff persisted, it could escalate into a broader debate over changing Mongolia's system of governance.

On 18 May, the Presidential Press Office announced that President Khürelsükh would not seek a second term in the 2027 presidential election. Khürelsükh further affirmed his stance on a surprise late-night appearance during the vote of confidence on 2 June. In his address to parliament, he firmly stated that "not individuals, but laws must govern. I don't understand who is talking about Mongolia shifting to a presidential system." and vowed not to lay a finger on the Constitution in pursuit of another term as President. Furthermore, he urged "As an elder brother, I advise: Do not deflect responsibility, mislead the public, or avoid accountability," in a remark widely interpreted as a warning to the Prime Minister.

Jargal DeFacto also noted that Oyun-Erdene's efforts to create a sovereign wealth fund and reduce reliance on a debt- and commodity-driven economy had provoked opposition from powerful business interests. Although the prime minister emphasized anti-corruption initiatives in sectors such as banking, mining, and education, the effectiveness of these efforts was questioned due to systemic issues within the judiciary. Public trust was further undermined by high inflation and rising interest rates.

== See also ==
- 2008 riot in Mongolia
- 2018–2019 Mongolian protests
- 2021 Mongolian protests
- 2022 Mongolian protests
- Mongolian Revolution of 1990
