= Zayasaikhan Sambuu =

Mongolian painter (born 1975)

Zaya
- Born: Zayasaikhan Sambuu; 1975 (age 50–51); Baatsagaan, Mongolia
- Education: Mongolian State University of Arts and Culture
- Occupation: Painter

Zayasaikhan Sambuu, also known as Zaya, is a Mongolian painter.

== Biography ==
Zaya was born Zayasaikhan Sambuu in 1975 in Mongolia, in an isolated village in the Gobi Desert. At fifteen he decided to become a Buddhist monk but the strict rules of the monastery were at odds with his irrepressible creativity. By the time he was a teenager, communist Mongolia was becoming less oppressive, and freedom of religion returning. Zaya was noticed for his talent in drawing, and started by drawing scenes of Buddhism, which was resurfacing after years of suppression.

At 17 he enrolled in the Soyol Fine Art College in Ulaanbaatar (the capital of Mongolia). There, traditional Mongolian art was taught. He continued his studies at the Mongolian State University of Arts and Culture, from which he obtained his bachelor's degree in 2002.

In 2015 he exposed a series of ink-and-watercolor paintings in San Francisco, inspired by Genghis Khan, his life and warriors. Of the latter paintings was said: "Combining traditional Mongolian styles with Japanese art techniques, the striking, highly detailed images bring these warriors and their era to life."

His works inspired a mural painting by Perm-based artist Maria Efimova.

== Bibliography ==
- Sambuu, Zayasaikhan (2016). The Art of Zaya. Zayasaikhan Sambuu. ISBN 978-9-997-35825-7.
