= Government of Mongolia =

Highest executive body and cabinet of Mongolia

- Монгол Улсын Засгийн газар ᠮᠣᠩᠭᠣᠯ ᠤᠯᠤᠰ ᠤ᠋ᠨ ᠵᠠᠰᠠᠭ ᠤ᠋ᠨ ᠭᠠᠵᠠᠷ
- Logo of the Government of Mongolia
- Role: Executive power
- Established: 29 December 1911 (first) (Note: As the Government of the Bogd Khanate of Mongolia); 21 July 1992 (current)
- Country: Mongolia
- Appointed by: Prime Minister
- Responsible to: State Great Khural
- Constituting instrument: Constitution of Mongolia

Cabinet
- Members: Uchral cabinet
- Prime Minister: Nyam-Osoryn Uchral
- First Deputy: Jadambyn Enkhbayar
- Deputy: Togmidyn Dorjkhand; Nyamtaishiryn Nomtoibayar
- Number of members: 19 (Note: Not including the Prime Minister)

Administration
- Working language: Mongolian
- Ministries: 16
- Location: Ulaanbaatar, Mongolia
- Seat: Government Palace (since 1951)
- Website: Official website

The Government of Mongolia (Mongolian: Монгол Улсын Засгийн газар, romanized: Mongol Ulsyn Zasgiin gazar) is the highest executive body and national cabinet of Mongolia. It consists of the Prime Minister of Mongolia and other cabinet ministers. The prime minister is designated by the State Great Khural, the unicameral parliament of Mongolia, and the remaining members are appointed and dismissed by the prime minister upon approval of the parliament.

The fundamentals of the government's organisation, as well as the method of its election and appointment, along with the procedure for its dismissal, are set down in the third chapter (articles 38 to 46) of the Constitution of Mongolia and Law of Mongolia on the Government of Mongolia.

The government is collectively responsible to the State Great Khural and must resign if a motion of no confidence is adopted by the State Great Khural. The State Great Khural determines the structure and composition of the government by submission of the prime minister. The government is one of the three subjects in Mongolia that have the right to initiate laws.

== Powers ==
As defined in Article 38 of the 1992 Constitution, government shall enforce the laws of the State, in accordance with the common functions to manage the economic, social and cultural structure shall exercise the following main/full powers:

1. Organize and ensure nation-wide enforcement of Constitution and other laws;
2. Develop a comprehensive policy on science and technology, guidelines for economic and social development, and state budget, credit and fiscal plans, and submit them to the State Great Khural;
3. Elaborate and implement measures on sectoral, inter-sectoral, as well as regional development matters;
4. Implement measures on environmental protection, and on proper use of natural resources and ecological restoration;
5. Controls and manages central organs of state administration (ministries) and directs local administrative organs;
6. Ensure national security and strengthen the defense capabilities;
7. Take measures for the protection of human rights and freedoms, strengthening of public order, and prevention of crime;
8. Implement foreign policy;
9. Conclude and implement international treaties to which Mongolia is a party in consultation with and subsequent ratification by the State Great Khural, as well as to conclude and abrogate inter-governmental treaties.

== Ministries ==
Since July 2024, there are currently sixteen ministries that make up the Mongolian cabinet.

- Ministry of Economy and Development
- Ministry of Foreign Affairs
- Ministry of Finance
- Ministry of Justice and Internal Affairs
- Ministry of Environment and Climate Change
- Ministry of Defense
- Minister of Education
- Ministry of Construction, Urban Development, and Housing
- Ministry of Road and Transport Development
- Ministry of Family, Labor and Social Protection
- Ministry of Food, Agriculture and Light Industry
- Ministry of Mining and Heavy Industry
- Ministry of Energy
- Ministry of Culture, Sports, Tourism, and Youth
- Ministry of Digital Development, Innovation, and Communications
- Ministry of Health

== Current cabinet ==
The current cabinet, headed by Nyam-Osoryn Uchral, was formed on 4 April 2026, succeeding the previous cabinet of Gombojavyn Zandanshatar. The government currently has 19 ministers, retaining the previous government's structure.

Party	Ministers	Percentage
Mongolian People's Party	16	84%
HUN Party	2	11%
National Coalition	1	5%
Total	19	100%

№	Office(s)	Portrait	Minister Constituency	Party	Took office	Left office
1	Prime Minister		Nyam-Osoryn Uchral; MP for 10th Chingeltei, Sükhbaatar	MPP	30 March 2026	Incumbent
2	First Deputy Prime Minister of Mongolia and Minister of Economy and Development		Jadambyn Enkhbayar; MP for 5th Darkhan-Uul, Selenge, Töv Province	MPP	25 November 2025 (renewed on 4 April 2026)	Incumbent
3	Deputy Prime Minister		Togmidyn Dorjkhand; Party list	HUN	10 July 2024 (renewed on 4 April 2026)	Incumbent
4	Deputy Prime Minister		Nyamtaishiryn Nomtoibayar; Party list	National Coalition	4 April 2026	Incumbent
5	Chief Cabinet Secretary		Battömöriin Enkhbayar; MP for 8th Bayanzürkh District	MPP	4 April 2026	Incumbent
6	Minister of Foreign Affairs		Batmönkhiin Battsetseg; MP for 1st Arkhangai, Bayankhongor, Övörkhangai Province	MPP	29 January 2021 (renewed on 4 April 2026)	Incumbent
7	Minister of Finance		Zagdjavyn Mendsaikhan; MP for 2nd Govi-Altai, Khovd, Uvs, Zavkhan Province	MPP	4 April 2026	Incumbent
8	Minister of Justice and Internal Affairs		Sainbuyangiin Amarsaikhan; MP for 13th Bagakhangai, Baganuur, Nalaikh District	MPP	4 April 2026	Incumbent
9	Minister of Mining and Heavy Industry		Gongoryn Damdinnyam; MP for 5th Darkhan-Uul, Selenge, Töv Province	MPP	18 June 2025 (renewed on 4 April 2026)	Incumbent
10	Ministry of Defense		Dambyn Batlut; MP for 4th Bulgan, Khövsgöl, Orkhon Province	MPP	18 June 2025 (renewed on 4 April 2026)	Incumbent
11	Minister of Environment and Climate Change		Tsendiin Sandag-Ochir; MP for 13th Bagakhangai, Baganuur, Nalaikh District	MPP	4 April 2026	Incumbent
12	Minister of Education		Luvsantserengiin Enkh-Amgalan; MP for 4th Bulgan, Khövsgöl, Orkhon Province	MPP	4 April 2026	Incumbent
13	Minister of Family, Labor and Social Protection		Telukhany Aubakir; MP for 3rd Bayan-Ölgii Province	MPP	18 June 2025 (renewed on 4 April 2026)	Incumbent
14	Minister of Road and Transport Development		Borkhüügiin Delgersaikhan; MP for 7th Govisümber, Dornogovi, Dundgovi, Ömnögovi Province	MPP	10 July 2024 (renewed on 4 April 2026)	Incumbent
15	Minister of Culture, Sports, Tourism, and Youth		Jukovyn Aldarjavkhlan; MP for 12th Khan-Uul District	MPP	4 April 2026	Incumbent
16	Minister of Construction, Urban Development, and Housing		Enkhtaivany Bat-Amgalan; MP for 8th Bayanzürkh District	MPP	18 June 2025 (renewed on 4 April 2026)	Incumbent
17	Minister of Food, Agriculture and Light Industry		Tsagaankhüügiin Iderbat; MP for 6th Dornod, Khentii, Sükhbaatar Province	MPP	4 April 2026	Incumbent
18	Minister of Digital Development, Innovation, and Communications		Chinbatyn Nomin; MP for 11th Songinokhairkhan District	MPP	4 April 2026	Incumbent
19	Minister of Energy		Badrakhyn Naidalaa; Party list	HUN	4 April 2026	Incumbent
20	Minister of Health		Enkhbayaryn Batshugar; MP for 11th Songinokhairkhan District	MPP	4 April 2026	Incumbent

== See also ==
- Constitution of Mongolia
- State Great Khural
- President of Mongolia
- Prime Minister of Mongolia
  - List of prime ministers of Mongolia
