= Tsengeltiin Jigjidjav =

Prime minister of Mongolia (1894–1933)

- Цэнгэлтийн Жигжиджав
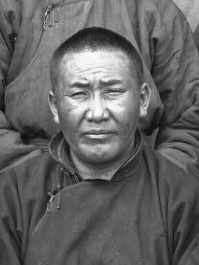

8th Prime Minister of Mongolia
- In office April 27, 1930 – July 2, 1932
- General Secretary: Peljidiin Genden; Zolbingiin Shijee; Bat-Ochiryn Eldev-Ochir
- Preceded by: Anandyn Amar
- Succeeded by: Peljidiin Genden

Personal details
- Born: 1894 Halzan district, Sükhbaatar Province, Mongolia, Qing China
- Died: May 22, 1933 (aged 38–39) Ulaanbaatar, Mongolian People's Republic

Tsengeltiin Jigjidjav (Mongolian: Цэнгэлтийн Жигжиджав; 1894 – May 22, 1933) was prime minister of Mongolia from 1930 to 1932.

== Political career ==
Jigjidjav was born in present-day Halzan district, in Sükhbaatar Province. He graduated from the Finance Ministry’s school of accountancy in 1924. The same year he joined the Mongolian People's Revolutionary Party (MPRP) and was appointed accountant of the Mongolian Central Cooperative (Montsenkoop) in 1925. In 1928 he was elected chairman of the General Committee of the Mongolian Central Cooperative.

Jigjidjav went on to become a member of the Presidium of the MPRP Central Committee as well as a member of the State Little Khural (Bag Hural). He was appointed prime minister on April 27, 1930. Some believe Jigjidjav was only an acting prime minister, while others consider him to have been a prime minister in full. The Mongolian government takes the latter view.

== 1932 armed uprising and downfall ==
In April 1932 a group of lamas, angered by heavy-handed persecution of Buddhist monks and government expropriations of monasteries, ignited a revolt in Khövsgöl Province by occupying several town centers. The uprising soon spread to four provinces in the northwest of the country and lasted until October 1932, with outbreaks reported in the east of the country as well. By June the Mongolian People's Army had brutally suppressed large pockets of the revolt. The involvement of the Soviet Red Army in the suppression is still debated.

Surprised by the breadth of the uprising, Soviet leader Joseph Stalin ordered that the implementation of socialism in Mongolia be temporarily scaled back. At the Third Congress of the MPRP (June 29–30, 1932), top leftist politicians were blamed for creating conditions that led to the revolt. A few days later, on July 2, 1932, Jigjidjav, who was known as the chief leftist personality in Mongolia, was stripped of all of his offices.

== Death and disgrace ==
Later in 1932 Jigjidjav was appointed minister of trade, road transport and communications development, a post he held until his death on May 22, 1933. The circumstances surrounding Jidjidjav's death remain unclear: he died after he was shot in his ger (home) on the outskirts of Ulaanbaatar. After his death he was accused of counterrevolutionary crimes and his name was linked with the Lkhümbe case.

Political offices
Preceded by Anandyn Amar	Prime Minister of Mongolia; 1930-1932	Succeeded by Peljidiin Genden
