= Dashzegviin Amarbayasgalan =

Mongolian politician

Amarbayasgalan Dashzegve
- Дашзэгвийн Амарбаясгалан
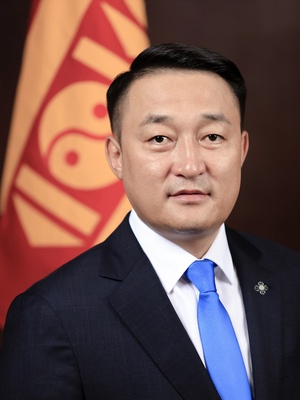
- Official portrait, 2024

Chairman of the State Great Khural
- In office 2 July 2024 – 17 October 2025
- Prime Minister: Luvsannamsrain Oyun-Erdene; Gombojavyn Zandanshatar
- Preceded by: Gombojavyn Zandanshatar
- Succeeded by: Bökhchuluuny Pürevdorj (acting); Nyam-Osoryn Uchral

Chief Cabinet Secretary
- In office 30 August 2022 – 2 July 2024
- Prime Minister: Luvsannamsrain Oyun-Erdene
- Preceded by: Tsendiin Nyamdorj
- Succeeded by: Nyam-Osoryn Uchral

Secretary-General of the Mongolian People's Party
- In office 12 December 2016 – 5 July 2024
- Party Chairman: Ukhnaagiin Khurelsukh; Luvsannamsrain Oyun-Erdene
- Preceded by: Jamyangiin Mönkhbat
- Succeeded by: Yangugiin Sodbaatar

Member of the State Great Khural
- Incumbent
- Assumed office 2 July 2024
- Constituency: 2nd, Gobi-Altai, Zavkhan, Khovd, Uvs Province

Personal details
- Born: November 27, 1981 (age 44) Taishir, Gobi-Altai, Mongolia
- Party: Mongolian People's Party
- Education: Mongolian University of Science and Technology; National University of Mongolia
- Occupation: Engineer; Politician
- Website: amarbayasgalan.com

Dashzegviin Amarbayasgalan (Mongolian: Дашзэгвийн Амарбаясгалан; born 27 November 1981), also referred to as Amarbayasgalan Dashzegve is a Mongolian politician, a member of the State Great Khural, and a member of the Mongolian People's Party (MPP). He served as Chairman of the State Great Khural from July 2024 to October 2025, when he was ousted by the State Great Khural along with Prime Minister Gombojavyn Zandanshatar.

Prior to assuming the position of chairman of the State Great Khural, Amarbayasgalan was the secretary general of the MPP. He was elected to an unprecedented fourth term as secretary general of the MPP in 2021. He is a social democrat, and is regarded as a prominent progressive within the MPP.

== Early life ==
Born as the youngest of four children in a family from Taishir in Govi-Altai Province, Amarbayasgalan grew up in a household dedicated to public service and progress. His father, Dugeriin Dashzegve, was a lifelong agricultural leader, serving as the head of the "Jaran Jil Cooperative" and a prominent local party figure. Dashzegve made significant contributions to improving livestock breeds and developing high-yield dairy and meat cattle, notably establishing a core herd of Norwegian Red cattle with imported high-quality genetics.

Amarbayasgalan's mother, Lamjavyn Norjin, was a respected educator.

== Political career ==
=== Early days (2007–2016) ===
Amarbayasgalan joined the MPP in 1998 as a young student and quickly rose through the ranks, becoming the leader of the 37th Party cell in Bayanzürkh District in 2007. His leadership during the 2008 parliamentary election campaign garnered significant recognition, and he became the youngest Citizens' Representative to be elected that year, representing Bayanzürkh District in the Citizens' Representatives Khural of the Capital City.

Amarbayasgalan was appointed as the head of the Communications and Public Relations Division of the Mongolian People's Party by then-Secretary General Ukhnaagiin Khürelsükh. In this role, he helped in strengthening the party's public engagement and modernizing its communications strategies.

=== Secretary General (2016–2024) ===
During his tenure as secretary general, Amarbayasgalan oversaw initiatives to modernize the party's operations. He was succeeded by Yangugiin Sodbaatar at the MPP Party Congress on 5 July 2024, following his successful election to the State Great Khural in the 2024 parliamentary elections.

=== Chairman of the State Great Khural ===
In the 2024 Mongolian parliamentary election, Amarbayasgalan was elected to the State Great Khural from the 2nd Gobi-Altai, Zavkhan, Khovd, and Uvs constituency. During the first session of the newly elected 9th State Great Khural, he was elected unanimously as the next Chairman of the State Great Khural on 2 July 2024. He was dismissed by the State Great Khural, along with Prime Minister Gombojavyn Zandanshatar on 17 October 2025. Deputy Chairman of the State Great Khural Bökhchuluuny Pürevdorj was appointed as acting speaker until a successor is chosen by the State Great Khural.
