= Jadambyn Enkhbayar =

Mongolian politician (born 1973)

- Жадамбын Энхбаяр
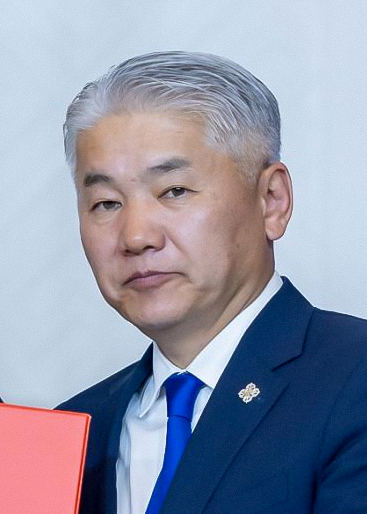
- Enkhbayar in 2025

First Deputy Prime Minister and Minister of Economy and Development
- Incumbent
- Assumed office 25 November 2025
- Prime Minister: Gombojavyn Zandanshatar; Nyam-Osoryn Uchral
- Preceded by: Nyam-Osoryn Uchral
Ministerial offices
Minister of Food, Agriculture and Light Industry
In office 10 July 2024 – 25 November 2025
Prime Minister	Luvsannamsrain Oyun-Erdene; Gombojavyn Zandanshatar
Preceded by	Khayangaagiin Bolorchuluun
Succeeded by	Myagmarsürengiin Badamsüren
Minister of Defense
In office August 2012 – January 2012
Prime Minister	Sükhbaataryn Batbold
Preceded by	Luvsanvandangiin Bold
Succeeded by	Dashdembereliin Bat-Erdene

Member of the State Great Khural
- Incumbent
- Assumed office 2 July 2024
- Constituency: 5th, Darkhan-Uul, Selenge, Töv Province
- In office July 2008 – 30 June 2020
- Constituency: 50th, Bayanzürkh (2016–2020); Closed list (2012–2016); 5th, Govi-Altai Province (2008–2012)

Personal details
- Born: 16 February 1973 (age 53) Ulaanbaatar, Mongolia
- Party: Mongolian People's Party
- Parent: Shagalyn Jadambaa (father)
- Education: National University of Mongolia (BA); Maastricht University (MA)

Jadambyn Enkhbayar (Mongolian: Жадамбын Энхбаяр; born 16 February 1973), sometimes referred to as Jadambaagiin Enkhbayar, is a Mongolian politician serving as First Deputy Prime Minister of Mongolia since 2025. He is the son of Lieutenant General Shagalyn Jadambaa. A member of the Mongolian People's Party (MPP), he has served multiple ministerial roles throughout his political career and is current President Ukhnaagiin Khürelsükh's close ally.

== Early life and education ==
Enkhbayar was born as the eldest child to a family of six on 16 February 1973 in Ulaanbaatar, the capital city of the Mongolian People's Republic. His father was Shagalyn Jadambaa, who served as lieutenant general of the Mongolian People's Army, Minister of Defense, and Chief of General Staff.

Enkhbayar completed his secondary education at School No.1 of Ulaanbaatar between 1980 and 1990. He enrolled at the Combined Military Higher School for less than a year in 1991 and graduated from the School of Law at the National University of Mongolia with a bachelor's degree in law in 1999. After enrolling at Maastricht University in the Netherlands, he graduated with a master's in business administration in 2005.

== List of notable positions ==
- First Deputy Prime Minister of Mongolia and Minister of Economy and Development (2025–present)
- Minister of Food, Agriculture and Light Industry (2024–2025)
- National Security and Political Policy Advisor to the President of Mongolia (2024)
- Secretary of the National Security Council of Mongolia (2021–2024)
- Senior Advisor and Chief of Staff to the Prime Minister of Mongolia (2020–2021)
- Ministry of Defense (2012)
- Member of the State Great Khural (2008–2020; 2024–present)

== Awards ==
- Order of the Polar Star (2008)
- Order of Military Merit
- Order of Sukhbaatar
- Order of the Red Banner of Labour

== Personal life ==
Enkhbayar is fluent in English and Russian.
