= Chairman of the State Great Khural =

Chairman of the parliament of Mongolia

- Улсын Их Хурлын дарга ᠤᠯᠤᠰ ᠤᠨ ᠶᠡᠬᠡ ᠬᠤᠷᠠᠯ ᠤᠨ ᠳᠠᠷᠤᠭ᠎ᠠ
- State Emblem of Mongolia

- Incumbent; Sandagiin Byambatsogt since 3 April 2026
- Style: Mr. Speaker
- Status: Presiding officer
- Member of: State Great Khural; National Security Council
- Seat: Government Palace
- Nominator: Majority of the State Great Khural
- Appointer: Majority of members of the State Great Khural
- Term length: Four years; renewable
- Formation: February 1992
- First holder: Natsagiin Bagabandi (1992)
- Deputy: Deputy Chairperson of the State Great Khural
- Salary: 62,102,880 ₮/US$ 18,393 annually (2024)
- Website: www.parliament.mn

The Chairman of the State Great Khural (Mongolian: Улсын Их Хурлын дарга, romanized: Ulsyn Ikh Khurlyn darga) is the presiding officer of the State Great Khural, the unicameral parliament of Mongolia, and a member of the National Security Council of Mongolia. It is the second-highest position, after the President and before the Prime Minister, in Mongolia. In case of the absence or death of the president, the chairman serves as acting head of state until a new president is elected or inaugurated.

== Election ==
According to the 11th article of the law regarding the State Great Khural in the Constitution of Mongolia, the chair is nominated by parties and coalitions with parliamentary seats and is elected from among its members by a majority vote. If a candidate fails to receive a majority support from members present at the vote, a new candidate shall be nominated by the State Great Khural.

The chairman is elected once the mandates of members are validated on the first session of the elected State Great Khural. During the vote, the eldest member presides the assembly and announces the results.

=== Latest election ===
Candidate	Votes	%
Yes Sandagiin Byambatsogt (MPP)	87	76.3%
Not voting	27	23.7%
Source: State Great Khural

== List of chairmen ==
No.	Chairman	Took office	Left office	Political party	Notes
–	Radnaasümbereliin Gonchigdorj	September 1990	29 July 1992	Mongolian Social Democratic Party	Chairman of the State Little Khural
1	Natsagiin Bagabandi	July 1992	July 1996	MPRP	After the 1992 Constitution was adopted
2	Radnaasümbereliin Gonchigdorj	July 1996	July 2000	Democratic Union	
3	Lkhamsurengiin Enebish	July 2000	September 2001	MPRP	
4	Sanjbegziin Tumur-Ochir	October 2001	13 August 2004	MPRP	
5	Nambaryn Enkhbayar	13 August 2004	June 2005	MPRP	
6	Tsendiin Nyamdorj	July 2005	June 2007	MPRP	
7	Danzangiin Lundeejantsan	June 2007	August 2008	MPRP	
8	Damdiny Demberel	September 2008	July 2012	MPRP → MPP	
9	Zandaakhüügiin Enkhbold	August 2012	5 July 2016	Democratic Party	
10	Miyeegombyn Enkhbold	5 July 2016	29 January 2019	MPP	
11	Gombojavyn Zandanshatar	1 February 2019	2 July 2024	MPP	
12	Dashzegviin Amarbayasgalan	2 July 2024	17 October 2025	MPP	
13	Nyam-Osoryn Uchral	20 November 2025	30 March 2026	MPP	
14	Sandagiin Byambatsogt	3 April 2026	Incumbent	MPP	

== See also ==
- State Great Khural
  - List of chairmen of the State Great Khural
- Government of Mongolia
  - Prime Minister of Mongolia
  - List of prime ministers of Mongolia
- President of Mongolia
  - List of presidents of Mongolia
