= First Deputy Prime Minister of Mongolia =

Second-highest position of the Government of Mongolia

First Deputy Prime Minister of Mongolia and Minister of Economy and Development
- Монгол Улсын Тэргүүн Шадар сайд бөгөөд Эдийн засаг, хөгжлийн сайд (Mongolian)
- Emblem of the Government of Mongolia

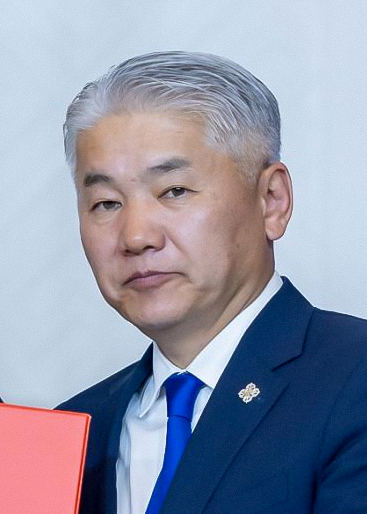
- Incumbent; Jadambyn Enkhbayar since 25 September 2025
- Member of: Government of Mongolia
- Appointer: Prime Minister of Mongolia
- Term length: No fixed term
- Constituting instrument: Law on the Government of Mongolia
- Precursor: First Deputy Chairperson of Council of Ministers of the Mongolian People's Republic
- Formation: 26 September 1990
- First holder: Davaadorjiin Ganbold
- Deputy: Any member of the government upon Prime Minister's decision
- Website: med.gov.mn/minister

The First Deputy Prime Minister of Mongolia and Minister of Economy and Development is the second highest ranking position in the Mongolian cabinet. Under the Law on the Government of Mongolia, the office is mainly responsible for national development and economic policy, and performs the duties of the Prime Minister during his or her temporary absence. As a member of cabinet, the officeholder is appointed and dismissed by the Prime Minister. The incumbent minister is Jadambyn Enkhbayar, who took office on 25 November 2025, succeeding Nyam-Osoryn Uchral.

== Responsibilities ==
Since 2024, the First Deputy Prime Minister and Minister of Economy and Development is responsible for:

- Economic policy and planning;
- Macro economic policy research and planning;
- Integrated policy and planning in science and technology;
- Economic cooperation and trade policy;
- Investment policy and planning;
- Industrialization policy and planning;
- Public–private partnership issues;
- Integrated policy to ensure human development and to support population growth;
- Intellectual property, patent, and copyright issues;
- Sovereign wealth fund issues.

== History ==
On 24 September 1990, Prime Minister Dashiin Byambasüren proposed creation of the positions of First Deputy Prime Minister and Deputy Prime Ministers and his intention to include representatives of other parties in a manner that reflected the views of the people as a whole. Two days later, Mongolian National Progress Party chairman Davaadorjiin Ganbold was appointed as First Deputy Prime Minister of the Mongolian People's Republic by the State Little Khural. The office was subsequently abolished, but it was revived during the coalition governments led by Sanjiin Bayar and later Sükhbaataryn Batbold between 2008 and 2012, when Democratic Party chairman Norovyn Altankhuyag was appointed to the post. In 2014, then Prime Minister Altankhuyag submitted to the State Great Khural a proposal to restore the post as part of an amendment to the Law on the Composition of the Government, but parliament turned down his request. The office was restored once again on 10 July 2024, when the State Great Khural adopted the Law on the Composition of the Government, re-establishing it under the current title. On the same day, Luvsannyamyn Gantömör, chairman of the Democratic Party was sworn in as a member of the Second Oyun-Erdene cabinet. Since then, the office has been held by ruling Mongolian People's Party politicians Nyam-Osoryn Uchral and J.Enkhbayar, during the premiership of Gombojavyn Zandanshatar.

=== List of Deputy Prime Ministers of Mongolia ===
No.	Portrait	Name (Birth–Death)	Term of office			Party	Government	Prime Minister (Tenure)
No.	Portrait	Name (Birth–Death)	Took office	Left office (Note: The appointment of a new prime minister will end the mandate of the previous government members.)	Duration	Party	Government	Prime Minister (Tenure)
First Deputy Prime Minister of the Mongolian People's Republic (1990-1992); Since 12 February 1992, First Deputy Prime Minister of Mongolia
1		Davaadorjiin Ganbold (born 1957)	26 September 1990	21 July 1992	1 year and 299 days	MNPP	Byambasüren	Dashiin Byambasüren (1990–1992)
First Deputy Prime Minister of Mongolia (2008-2012)
2		Norovyn Altankhuyag (born 1958)	19 September 2008	20 January 2012	3 years and 123 days	DP	Bayar II	Sanjiin Bayar (2007–2009)
2		Norovyn Altankhuyag (born 1958)	19 September 2008	20 January 2012	3 years and 123 days	DP	Batbold	Sükhbaataryn Batbold (2009–2012)
First Deputy Prime Minister of Mongolia and Minister of Economy and Development (2024-present)
3		Luvsannyamyn Gantömör (born 1973)	10 July 2024	13 June 2025	338 days	DP	Oyun-Erdene II	Luvsannamsrain Oyun-Erdene (2021–2025)
4		Nyam-Osoryn Uchral (born 1987)	18 June 2025	20 November 2025	155 days	MPP	Zandanshatar	Gombojavyn Zandanshatar (2025–2026)
5		Jadambyn Enkhbayar (born 1973)	25 November 2025	30 March 2026	125 days	MPP	Zandanshatar	Gombojavyn Zandanshatar (2025–2026)
5		Jadambyn Enkhbayar (born 1973)	4 April 2026	Incumbent	156 days	MPP	Uchral	Nyam-Osoryn Uchral (2026-present)

== See also ==
- Prime Minister of Mongolia
- Deputy Prime Minister of Mongolia
- Government of Mongolia
