= Gombojavyn Zandanshatar =

Prime Minister of Mongolia from 2025 to 2026

- Гомбожавын Занданшатар
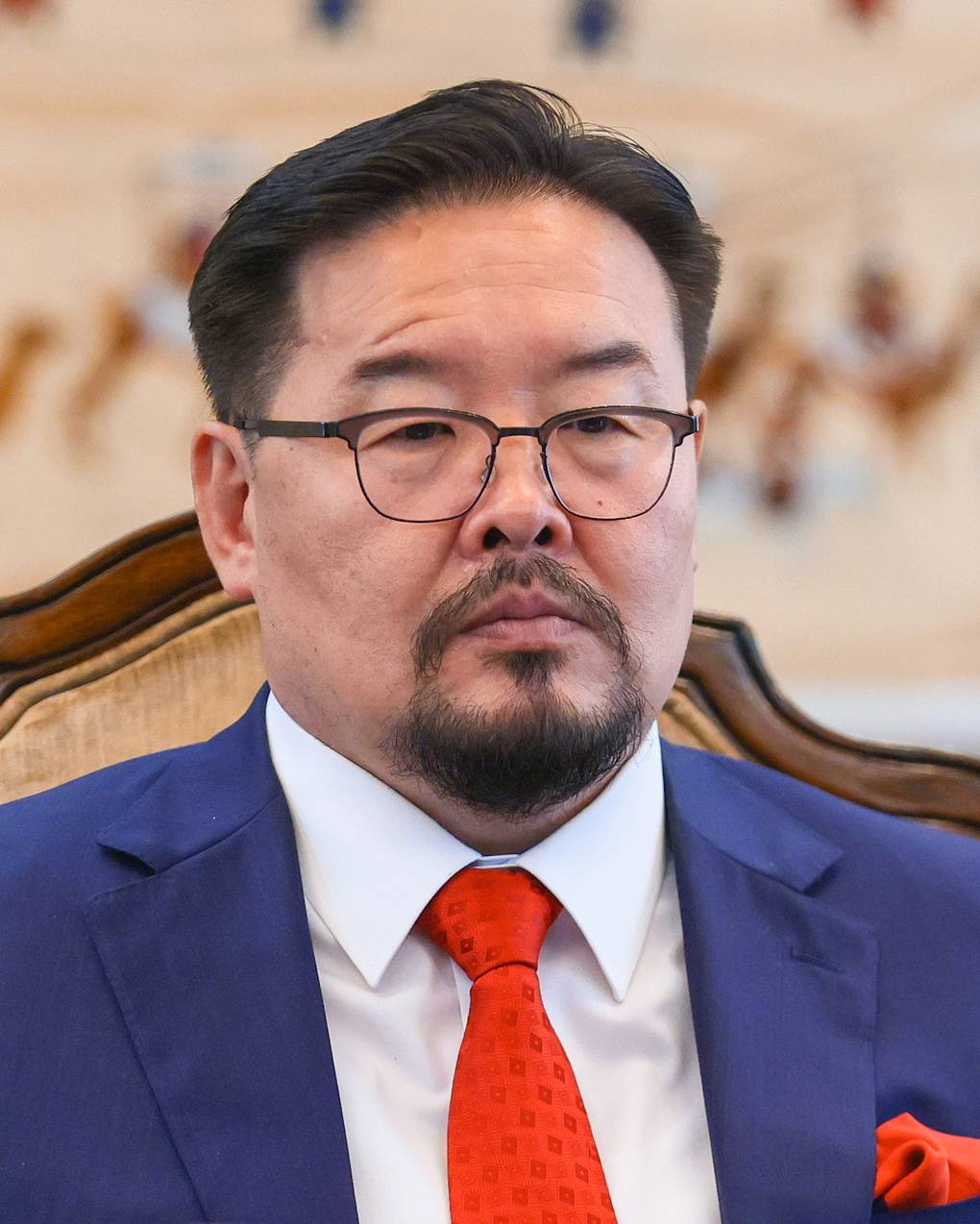
- Zandanshatar in 2022

Prime Minister of Mongolia
- In office 13 June 2025 – 30 March 2026
- President: Ukhnaagiin Khürelsükh
- Deputy: Sainbuyangiin Amarsaikhan; Togmidyn Dorjkhand; Khassuuriin Gankhuyag
- Preceded by: Luvsannamsrain Oyun-Erdene
- Succeeded by: Nyam-Osoryn Uchral

Chairman of the State Great Khural
- In office 1 February 2019 – 2 July 2024
- Preceded by: Miyeegombyn Enkhbold
- Succeeded by: Dashzegviin Amarbayasgalan

Chief Cabinet Secretary of Mongolia
- In office 4 October 2017 – 1 February 2019
- Prime Minister: Ukhnaagiin Khürelsükh
- Preceded by: Jamyangiin Mönkhbat
- Succeeded by: Luvsannamsrain Oyun-Erdene

Minister of Foreign Affairs and Trade
- In office September 2009 – August 2012
- Prime Minister: Sanjaagiin Bayar; Sükhbaataryn Batbold
- Preceded by: Sükhbaataryn Batbold
- Succeeded by: Luvsanvandangiin Bold

Member of the State Great Khural
- In office 5 July 2016 – 2 July 2024
- Constituency: 3rd, Bayankhongor Province (2020–2024); 7th, Bayankhongor Province (2016–2020)
- In office August 2004 – August 2012
- Constituency: 3rd, Bayankhongor Province (2008–2012); 7th, Bayankhongor Province (2004–2008)

Personal details
- Born: 8 March 1970 (age 56) Baatsagaan, Bayankhongor, Mongolia
- Party: Mongolian People's Party
- Children: 4
- Education: Baikal State University (MA); Maastricht University (MBA)
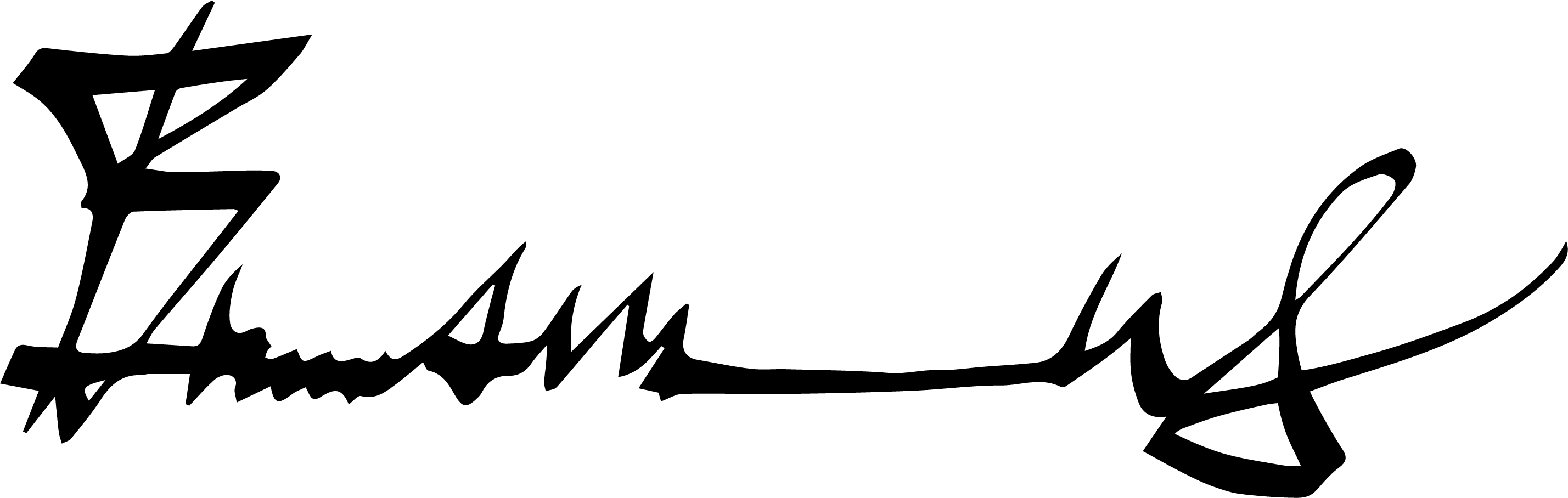
- Signature

Gombojavyn Zandanshatar (Mongolian: Гомбожавын Занданшатар; born 8 March 1970) is a Mongolian politician and economist who served as Prime Minister of Mongolia from 13 June 2025 until his resignation on 27 March 2026. He remained as caretaker until 30 March 2026, when Nyam-Osoryn Uchral succeeded him. A member of the Mongolian People's Party (MPP), he served as a member and chairman of the State Great Khural from 2019 to 2024.

Born in Bayankhongor Province, Zandanshatar joined politics in 2003 and served as the Deputy Minister of Food and Agriculture until 2004, when he was elected to the State Great Khural in the 2004 parliamentary election. In 2009, Zandanshatar became the Minister of Foreign Affairs and Trade and served in this role until 2012, when he stood down from active politics in the 2012 parliamentary election. He returned to politics with his election as MP in 2016. Zandanshatar was appointed as Chief Cabinet Secretary and served from 2017 until 2019.

In February 2019, Zandanshatar was elected the Chairman of the State Great Khural and served in this role until 2024, when he lost reelection. In June 2025, Prime Minister Luvsannamsrain Oyun-Erdene lost a confidence vote and immediately resigned following mass youth-led protests against his government for corruption. Zandanshatar, as a non-member of parliament, was then nominated prime minister by President Ukhnaagiin Khürelsükh to succeed Oyun-Erdene and was confirmed by the State Great Khural on 12 June. He was officially appointed the following day on 13 June.

Zandanshatar was voted to be ousted by the State Great Khural on 17 October 2025, but President Khürelsükh vetoed the motion on 20 October, citing procedural errors. Three days later, the Constitutional Court ruled that the parliamentary vote was unconstitutional. Zandanshatar remained as prime minister until 27 March 2026, when he resigned from his post to end a month-long political deadlock amid a global fuel crisis. He was succeeded by Nyam-Osoryn Uchral, the parliamentary speaker and MPP chairperson, on 30 March 2026.

== Early life and education ==
Gombojavyn Zandanshatar was born in Baatsagaan, Mongolia, on 8 March 1970. He graduated from the 77th secondary school in 1987, Irkutsk Institute of Finance and Economics (modern-day Baikal State University of Economics and Law) with a degree in financial economics after attending from 1987 to 1992, Maastricht University with a master's degree, and the Russian State University of Natural Resources and Law in 2012.

== Career ==
=== Academic and banking ===
At the University of Finance and Economics, Zandanshatar was a researcher in the Market Business Research Centre from 1992 to 1995. During Zandanshatar's banking career, he worked at Agricultural Bank from 1995 to 1998, was deputy director at Khan Bank from 2000 to 2003, and Bank of Mongolia. From 2014 to 2016, he was a visiting scholar at Stanford University. He was chair of the Mongolian Chess Federation.

=== Political career ===
In the 2004 parliamentary election, Zandanshatar was elected to the State Great Khural from his home province, Bayankhongor. From 2003 to 2004, Zandanshatar was the Deputy Minister of Food and Agriculture of Mongolia. He was reelected as member of the State Great Khural in the 2008 parliamentary election. From 2009 to 2012, he was Minister of Foreign Affairs and Trade. He served as the secretary-general of the Mongolian People's Party from 2012 to 2013.

In 2016, he returned to politics and was elected as member of parliament (MP) for the third time. He was appointed to the cabinet of Prime Minister Ukhnaagiin Khürelsükh as Chief Cabinet Secretary in October 2017.

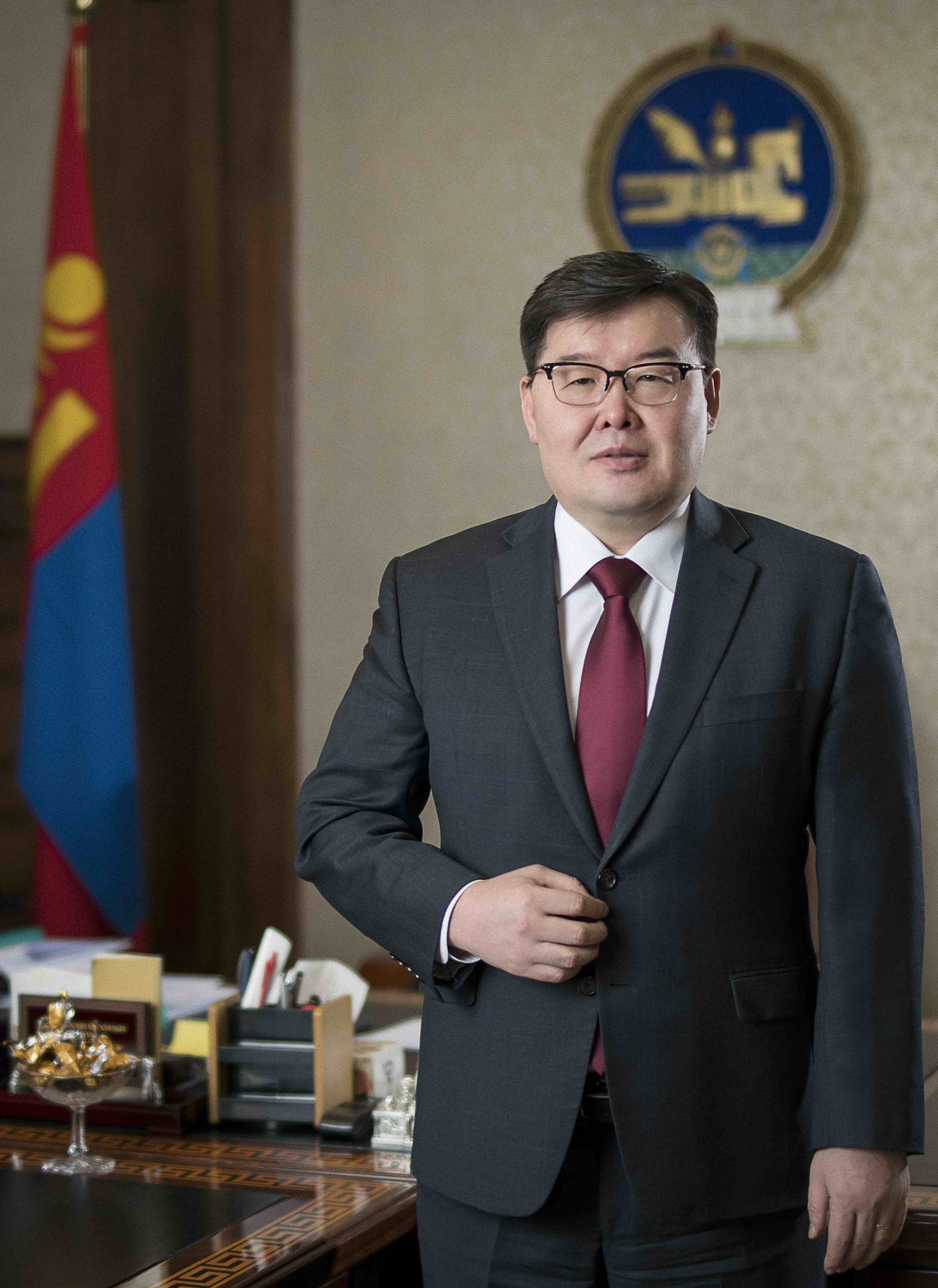
Official portrait as Chairman of the State Great Khural, 2019

In late 2018, several senior government officials were revealed to be embezzling government funds and allegedly part of a cabal between the ruling MPP and the opposition Democratic Party. This revelation led to the 2018–2019 Mongolian protests, which called for the resignation of several senior officials, most notably then-parliamentary speaker and senior MPP member, Miyeegombyn Enkhbold. Following the mass demonstrations, 40 lawmakers submitted a demand for speaker Enkhbold to resign from his position in December 2018. Enkhbold was dismissed (43-22) from his post in a parliamentary vote on 29 January 2019. Cabinet secretariat Zandanshatar was nominated by the MPP to succeed Enkhbold on 31 January. He was officially relieved from his ministerial duties and inaugurated as Chairman of the State Great Khural on 1 February 2019. Zandanshatar served as chairman of the State Great Khural from 2019 to 2024.

He lost his reelection in the 2024 parliamentary elections and subsequently served as Chief of Staff of the Office of the President of Mongolia until June 2025.

== Prime Minister of Mongolia (2025–2026) ==
Prime Minister Luvsannamsrain Oyun-Erdene resigned on 3 June 2025, in response to anti-government protests regarding the lavish spending of his son and after losing a motion of no confidence. Zandanshatar was selected by a vote of 108 to 9 to replace Oyun-Erdene on 12 June. He was appointed as Prime Minister of Mongolia the next day.

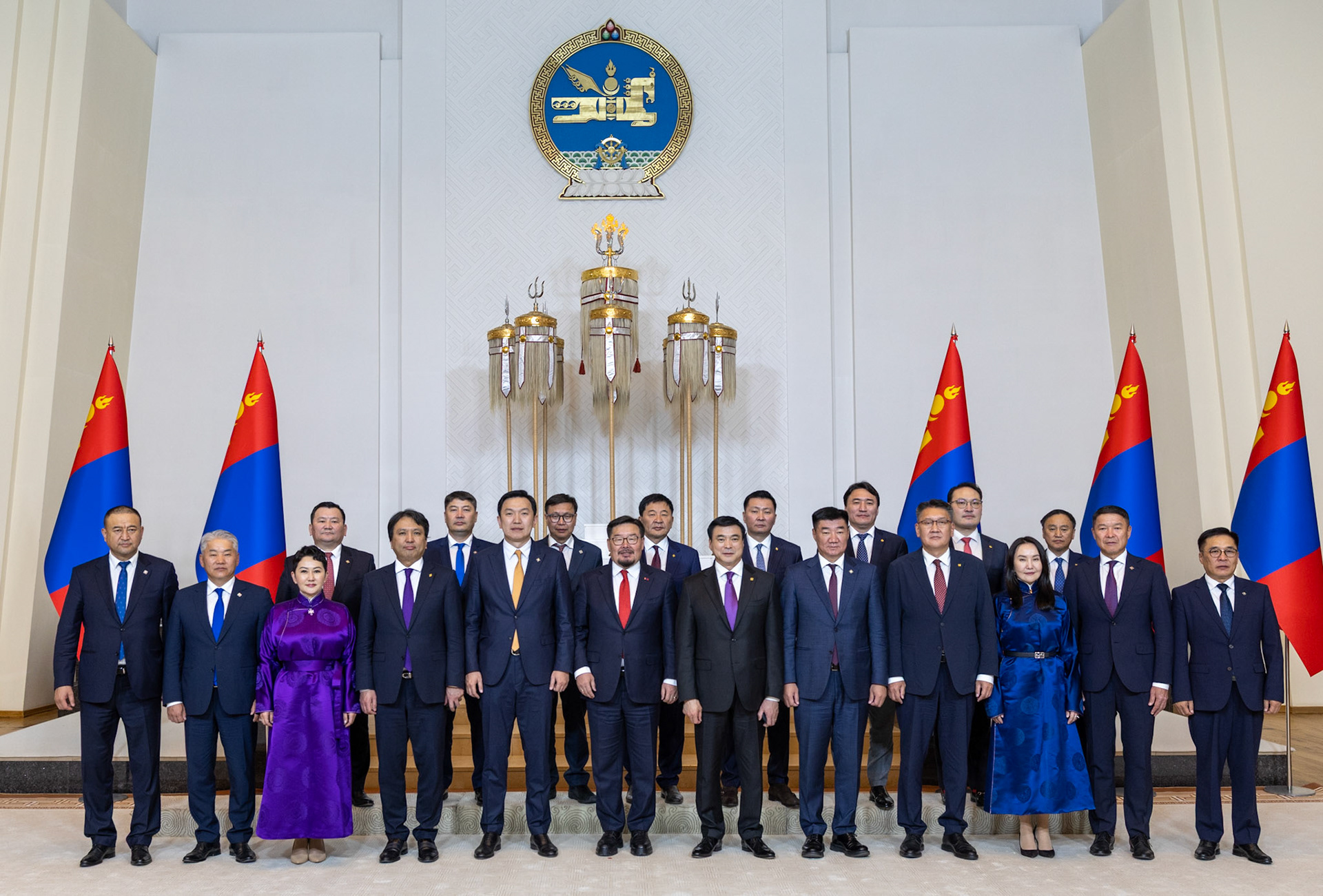
Cabinet of Gombojavyn Zandanshatar, 18 June 2025

On 18 June, a coalition government led by Zandanshatar was formed between the Mongolian People's Party, the HUN Party and the Civil Will–Green Party. The Democratic Party, the main opposition in parliament, was expelled from the previous coalition government for "breaking the memorandum of understanding" amidst the 2025 protests. A total of 19 ministers were appointed, a slight decrease from Oyun-Erdene's second cabinet which had 22 ministers.

=== Economy ===
After assuming the premiership, Zandanshatar stated that the 2025 budget approved by Oyun-Erdene's government needed to be reduced by $640 million. The 2025 government budget became one of the costliest budgets to be approved by the State Great Khural in Mongolia's modern history. President Khürelsükh vetoed the 2025 budget in November 2024 and urged parliament to approve a deficit-free budget. The government immediately became unpopular among the public in the first half of the year due to fiscal deficit and ultimately led to the downfall of Oyun-Erdene's tenure. Budget austerity became the primary concern of Zandanshatar's government.

Zandanshatar claimed his government cut ₮2.3 trillion MNT from the budget in July, allegedly turning the looming deficit into a surplus. The foreign exchange reserves hit US$5.7 billion, and GDP growth rose from 2.4% to 5.6%. Mongolia's rising copper export, which accounted 37.6% of total exports in the first 8 months of 2025, constituted the bulk of this growth.

=== 2025 political crisis ===
Tensions between factions in the ruling Mongolian People's Party began to brew in early 2025 after the resignation of Oyun-Erdene. Oyun-Erdene advocated for the establishment of a sovereign wealth fund and a reduction in debt- and commodity-driven economy, which in turn provoked opposition from powerful business interests. Following the 2025 Mongolian protests, majority of the MPP sided against Oyun-Erdene, including President Khürelsükh. Zandanshatar, then-Chief of Staff of the Office of the President, was nominated by Khürelsükh as the next prime minister. Oyun-Erdene remained the chairman of the MPP until the MPP's next General Assembly in September.

On 27–28 September, during the eighth General Assembly of the MPP, leadership disputes and generational divides arose between factions allied to PM Zandanshatar and his primary opponent, parliamentary speaker Dashzegviin Amarbayasgalan. In the chairmanship election, neither Zandanshatar nor Amarbayasgalan met the required two-thirds majority, both securing 56.1% and 44% of the vote, respectively. Zandanshatar and his allies boycotted the second round in which Amarbayasgalan won 257 of the 321 votes. The party chairman was to become the prime minister according to the MPP charter; thereby, a confirmation of Amarbayasgalan's election by the Supreme Court threatened Zandanshatar's tenure. To secure political legitimacy, Zandanshatar proposed to establish a dual party leadership, to which Amarbayasgalan declined and condemned him as "undemocratic".

Zandanshatar accused Amarbayasgalan of being involved in the coal theft scandal and appointed Battumuriin Enkhbayar as Minister of Justice and Internal Affairs to investigate Amarbayasgalan. Subsequently, the party revoked Enkhbayar's membership. In the ensuing chaos, seven MPP lawmakers threatened to leave the party if the decision was not reversed.

On 17 October 2025, the State Great Khural accepted Amarbayasgalan's resignation letter. Later the same day, Zandanshatar was dismissed as prime minister, with 40 votes supporting him and 71 opposing, in a parliamentary vote. His tenure lasted for 125 days, which made him the shortest-serving prime minister in Mongolia's modern history. He was to remain as caretaker prime minister until a successor was chosen by the President and the State Great Khural within 30 days.

On 20 October 2025, Zandanshatar's removal was vetoed by President Khürelsükh, citing procedural errors. The Constitutional Court ruled on 23 October that the parliamentary motion was unconstitutional and had no legal basis. Both the procedural conduct of the session and the resolution on the dismissal of Zandanshatar were ruled inconsistent with the constitution. Zandanshatar withdrew his candidacy from the upcoming MPP chairmanship election to "prioritize national stability and interests" on 11 November. Nyam-Osoryn Uchral, then-First Deputy Prime Minister, was elected the next party chairman during the 31st Congress of the MPP on 15 November.

=== Resignation ===
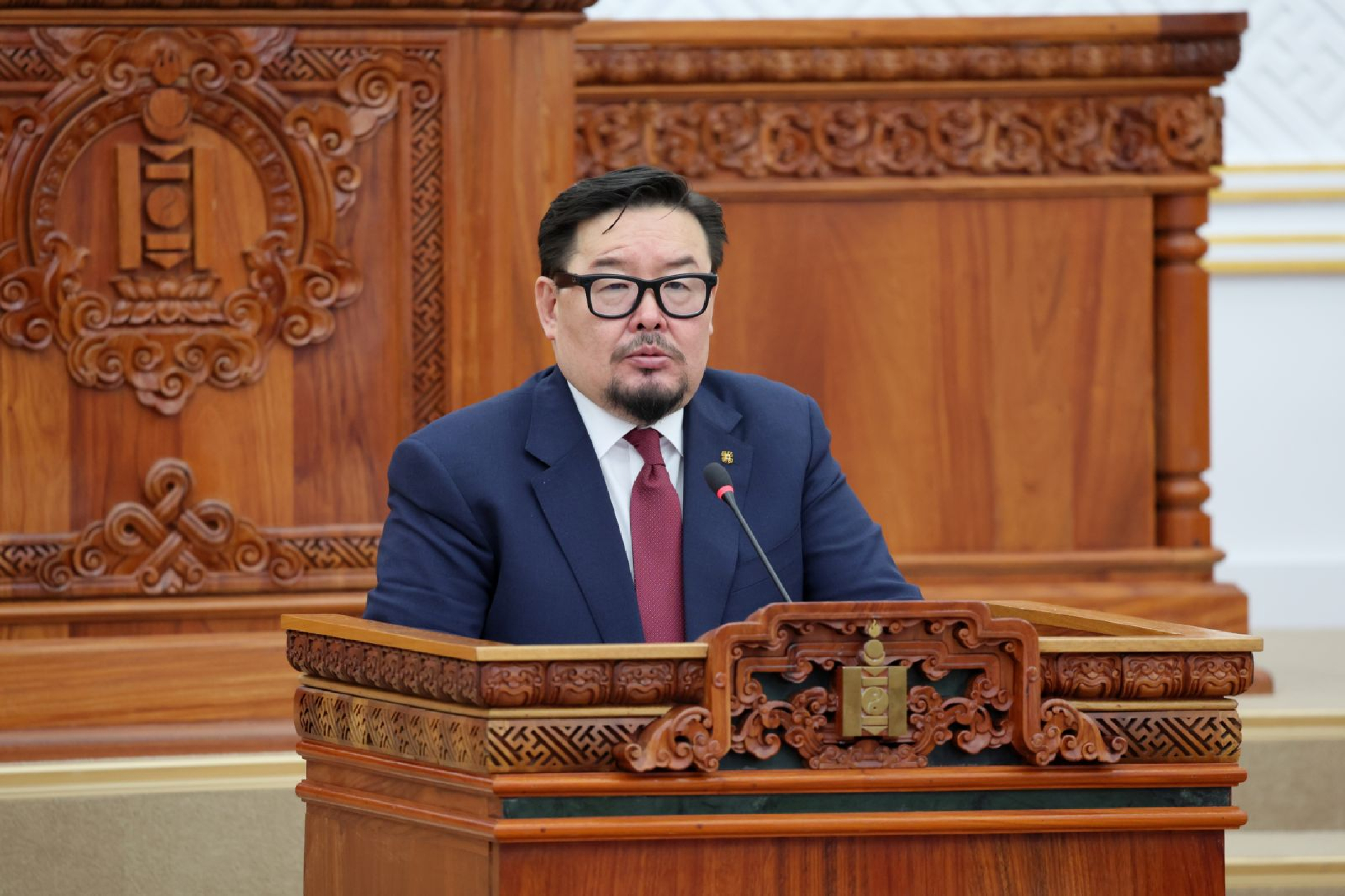
Zandanshatar during his address to parliament after his resignation was accepted, 27 March 2026

On 17 December 2025, the appointment of 17 deputy ministers prompted the Democratic Party to initiate proceedings seeking Zandanshatar's dismissal. Opposition leader Odongiin Tsogtgerel later stated that enough signatures had been collected to formally propose the removal of the cabinet led by Zandanshatar.

When the State Great Khural opened its regular spring session on 16 March 2026, the Democratic Party boycotted parliamentary proceedings, arguing that the leader of the ruling party should not preside over parliament. Although the Mongolian People's Party alone held 68 seats, enough for a parliamentary majority, internal divisions within the party prevented the legislature from reaching a quorum and stalled its activity. On 27 March 2026, Zandanshatar tendered his resignation, citing the need to avoid further delays in government leadership amid worsening domestic and external conditions. Later that day, the State Great Khural accepted his resignation. He remained in office until a new prime minister was appointed within 30 days.

MPP party chairman and parliamentary speaker, Nyam-Osoryn Uchral, was overwhelmingly nominated by the Executive Council of the MPP on 29 March and by the State Great Khural (88–19) on 30 March. Zandanshatar formally handed over the prime minister's seal to Uchral on the following midnight.

== Personal life ==
Zandanshatar can speak English and Russian. He is married and is the father of four children.

== Awards ==
=== National awards ===
- Mongolia: Order of the Polar Star (2005)
- Mongolia: Order of Sukhbaatar (2022)

=== Foreign awards ===
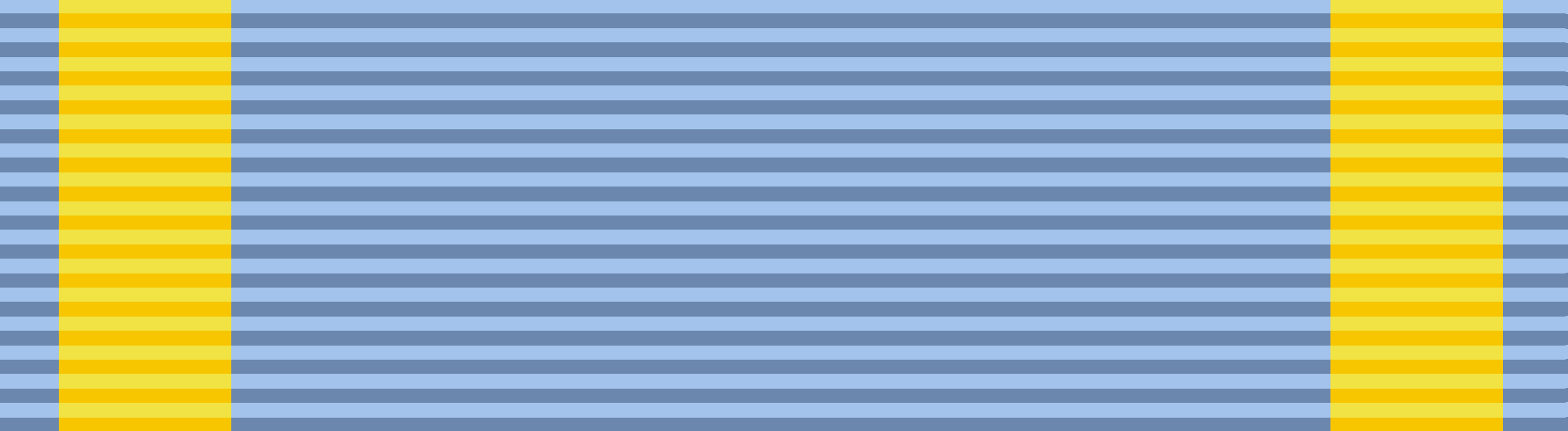
- Ukraine: Order of Prince Yaroslav the Wise, 3rd class (2011)

== Electoral history ==
Zandanshatar served as member of the State Great Khural from 2004 to 2012 and again from 2016 to 2024. Each of his consecutive two terms ended with a defeat in reelection.

Election	Constituency	Party	Votes	Result
2004	7th, Bayankhongor	MPRP	8,104	Elected
2008	3rd, Bayankhongor	MPRP	19,895	Elected
2012	3rd, Bayankhongor	MPP	15,175	Not elected
2016	7th, Bayankhongor	MPP	7,138	Elected
2020	3rd, Bayankhongor	MPP	24,029	Elected
2024	1st, Arkhangai, Bayankhongor, Övörkhangai	MPP	53,649	Not elected

== Works cited ==
=== News ===
- "Mongolia gets a new prime minister who pledged to address the economic demands of protesters". Associated Press. 13 June 2025. Archived from the original on 24 June 2025.
- "Mongolian president's chief of staff appointed as new PM". Xinhua News Agency. 13 June 2025. Archived from the original on 24 June 2025.
- Bodeen, Christopher (3 June 2025). "Resource-rich Mongolia faces political uncertainty after the prime minister resigns". Associated Press. Archived from the original on 24 June 2025.

=== Web ===
- "Гомбожавын Занданшатар". State Great Khural. Archived from the original on 5 October 2022.
- "Gombojavyn Zandanshatar". Stanford University. Archived from the original on 24 June 2025.
- "Gombojav, Zandanshatar". Permanent representative to the United Nations. Archived from the original on 27 September 2012.
- "Minister". Ministry of Foreign Affairs. Archived from the original on 29 June 2012.
- Martinovich, Milenko (2 May 2017). "Collaboration at Stanford leads to Mongolian parliament passing law on public opinion polling". Stanford University. Archived from the original on 24 June 2025.

Political offices
Preceded by Luvsannamsrain Oyun-Erdene	Prime Minister of Mongolia; 2025–2026	Succeeded by Nyam-Osoryn Uchral
Preceded by Miyeegombyn Enkhbold	Chairman of the State Great Khural; 2019–2024	Succeeded by Dashzegviin Amarbayasgalan
