= Baatsagaan =

District in Bayankhongor Province, Mongolia

Baatsagaan District Баацагаан сум ᠪᠠ ᠴᠠᠭᠠᠨᠰᠤᠮᠤ
- District
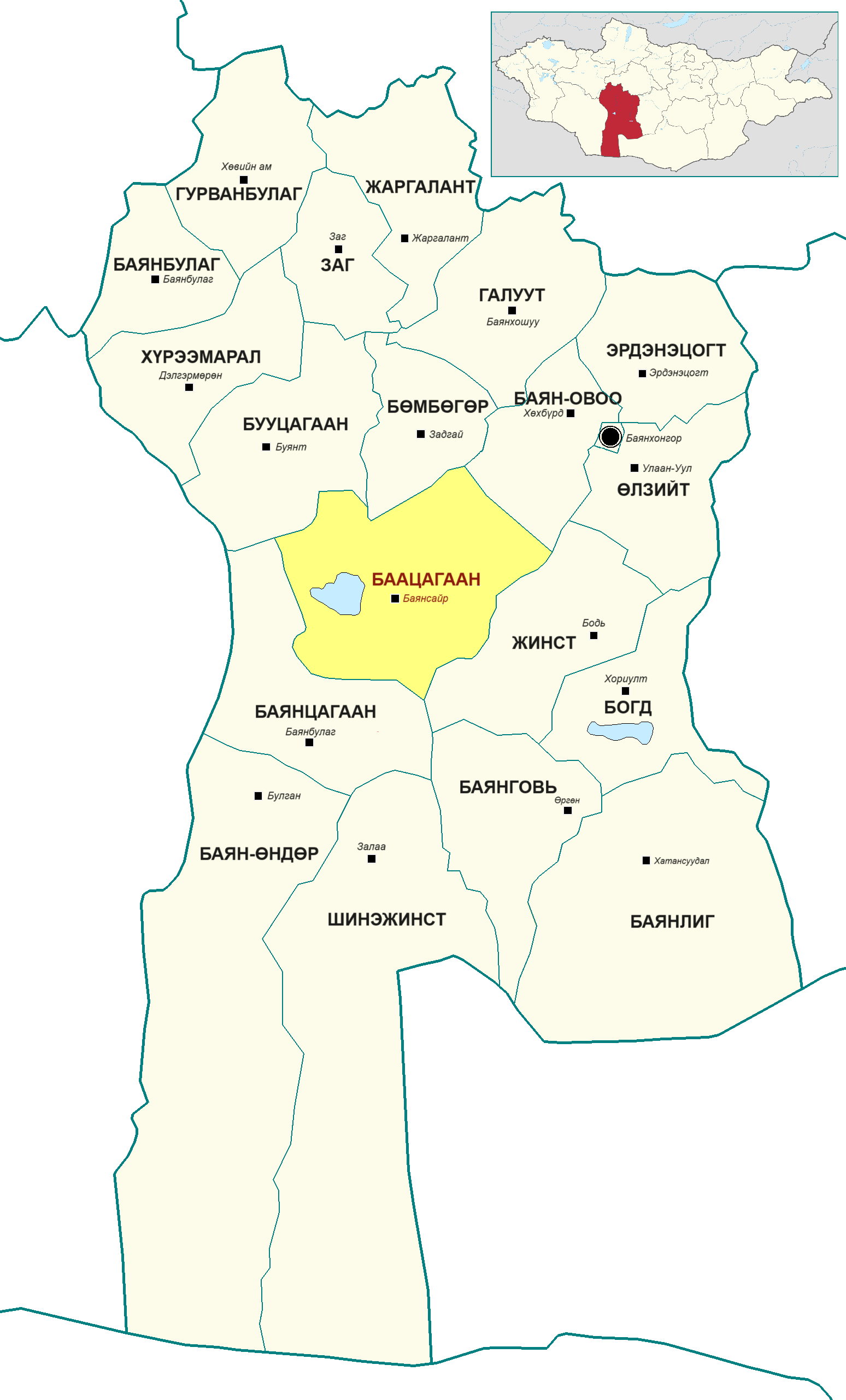
- Baatsagaan District in Bayankhongor Province

- Location in Mongolia
- Coordinates: 45°33′15″N 99°26′08″E
- Country: Mongolia
- Province: Bayankhongor Province

Area
  - Total: 2,875 sq mi (7,447 km^{2})

Population (2006)
  - Total: 3,568
  - Density: 1.2/sq mi (0.48/km^{2})
- Time zone: UTC+8

Baatsagaan (Mongolian: Баацагаан, Baatsagaan) is a sum (district) of Bayankhongor Province in southern Mongolia. Its area is 7,447 km^{2}, and its population was 3,568 people in 2006.

The center of Baatsagaan is Bayansair village, located 125 km from the administrative center of the province (aimak), the city of Bayankhongor and 625 km from the national capital Ulaanbaatar. The climate is sharply continental.

== Geology ==
The Böön Tsagaan Lake seated at the center of the district.

== Administrative divisions ==
The district is divided into seven bags, which are:

- Bayanbulag
- Bayansair
- Builsan
- Mogoi
- Oroin Buuts
- Tovgor
- Zuunkhayaa

== Notable natives ==
- Gombojavyn Zandanshatar, prime minister of Mongolia
