= Nyam-Osoryn Uchral =

Prime minister of Mongolia since 2026

His Excellency Nyam-Osoryn Uchral
- Ням-Осорын Учрал
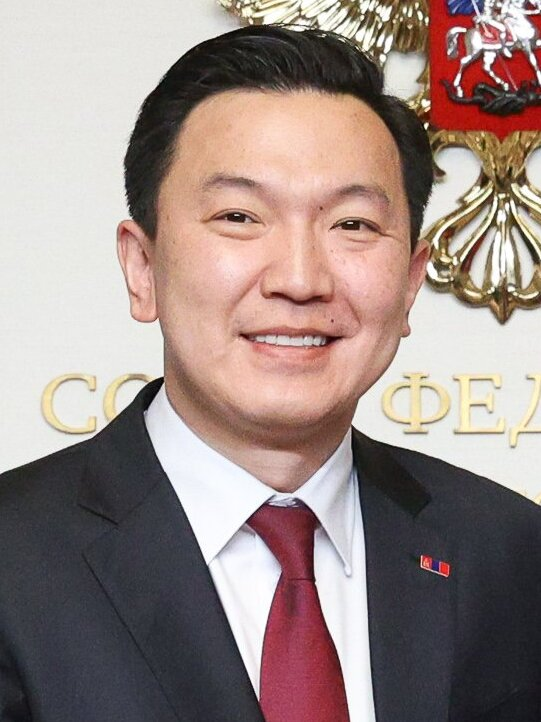
- Uchral in 2026

Prime Minister of Mongolia
- Incumbent
- Assumed office 30 March 2026
- President: Ukhnaagiin Khürelsükh; Sandagiin Byambatsogt (acting)
- Deputy: Jadambyn Enkhbayar; Togmidyn Dorjkhand; Nyamtaishiryn Nomtoibayar
- Preceded by: Gombojavyn Zandanshatar

Chairman of the State Great Khural
- In office 20 November 2025 – 30 March 2026
- Preceded by: Dashzegviin Amarbayasgalan; Jadambyn Bat-Erdene (acting)
- Succeeded by: Sandagiin Byambatsogt

Chairman of the Mongolian People's Party
- Incumbent
- Assumed office 15 November 2025
- Preceded by: Luvsannamsrain Oyun-Erdene
Ministerial offices
First Deputy Prime Minister of Mongolia and Minister of Economy and Development
In office 18 June 2025 – 20 November 2025
Prime Minister	Gombojavyn Zandanshatar
Preceded by	Luvsannyamyn Gantömör
Succeeded by	Jadambyn Enkhbayar
Chief Cabinet Secretary
In office 10 July 2024 – 17 June 2025
Prime Minister	Luvsannamsrain Oyun-Erdene
Preceded by	Dashzegviin Amarbayasgalan
Succeeded by	Sandagiin Byambatsogt
Minister of Digital Development and Communications
In office 30 August 2022 – 10 July 2024
Prime Minister	Luvsannamsrain Oyun-Erdene
Preceded by	Luvsantserengiin Enkh-Amgalan (acting)
Succeeded by	Tsendiin Baatarkhüü

Member of the State Great Khural
- Incumbent
- Assumed office 5 July 2016
- Constituency: 72nd, Songinokhairkhan district (2016–2020); 28th, Songinokhairkhan district (2020–2024); 9th, Chingeltei, Sükhbaatar district (2024–present)

Personal details
- Born: 2 January 1987 (age 39) Ulaanbaatar, Mongolia
- Party: Mongolian People's Party (since 2009)
- Spouse: Ch.Selenge
- Education: Ikh Zasag International University (BA); Mongolian State University of Education (MA); University of Gloucestershire (MBA); Institute for Mongolian, Buddhist and Tibetan Studies (Candidate of Sciences)
- Website: uchral.mn

Nyam-Osoryn Uchral (Note: Mongolian: Ням-Осорын Учрал, romanized: Nyam Osoriin Uchral, IPA: [ˌnʲam‿ɔsɔ̆ˈriɴ ˈʊtɕʰrăɮ]) (born 2 January 1987) is a Mongolian politician, businessman and former hip-hop artist who has been the Prime Minister of Mongolia since 30 March 2026 and the Chairman of the Mongolian People's Party since 15 November 2025. A member of the Mongolian People's Party (MPP), he was elected a member of the State Great Khural in 2016, 2020, and 2024. He was previously appointed the Minister for Digital Development and Communications in 2022 and Chief Cabinet Secretary in 2024 by prime minister Luvsannamsrain Oyun-Erdene. Later in 2025, he was appointed the First Deputy Prime Minister by succeeding prime minister Gombojavyn Zandanshatar. Uchral rose to national prominence in November 2025 when he was elected leader of the MPP and Chairman of the State Great Khural at the age of 38. His elevation occurred in the aftermath of a managed party congress that ended months of internal deadlock between MPP factions.

Following the resignation of prime minister Gombojavyn Zandanshatar on 27 March 2026, the Executive Council of the MPP officially nominated Uchral as the next prime minister on 29 March 2026. He was elected (88–19) as the 35th Prime Minister of Mongolia by the State Great Khural on 30 March 2026. The subsequent midnight, he officially succeeded Zandanshatar. He has served as President of the Social Democracy–Mongolian Youth Federation, the youth wing of the MPP, since 2019, and has been a member of the IPU's Standing Committee on United Nations Affairs. Uchral is the heir of the Khunnu group companies, which owns Ikh Zasag International University and other businesses in Mongolia.

== Childhood and education ==
Uchral was born in Ulaanbaatar on 2 January 1987 as the eldest child of Namsraigiin Nyam-Osor and Jambalyn Tsetsegmaa. He attended the 97th secondary school and Ikh Zasag Lyceum, where he completed his upper secondary education in 2003. He earned a B.A. in law at Ikh Zasag International University, a university founded by his father, in 2007 and an MBA degree at the Limkokwing University of Creative Technology in the United Kingdom between 2008 and 2010. Uchral has often appeared at debate championships winning district and national titles in debate tournaments.

Uchral also earned a master's degree in historical sciences at Mongolian State University of Education in 2012 and a PhD in historical sciences at the Siberian Branch of the Russian Academy of Sciences in 2013. In 2019, he obtained a master's in international business from the University of Gloucestershire. After arriving in Mongolia, he founded the Royal International University.

== Music career ==
In the early 2000s, Uchral started his hip-hop music career under the name Timon (Тимон/Темон), one of the supporting fictional characters of the animated movie, The Lion King. During his hip-hop career, he made several hits following his album "That is it." His hits such as "For you" (Чиний төлөө), "Only before you" (Чиний л өмнө), "I'm a distrustful guy" (Би хартай залуу). "Got any apartment" (Байртай юу), and "My love, kiss me" (Хайр аа, үнсээч) became popular among the Mongolian youth in the 2000s. A recent cover of his hit song “Only before you” by a rising artist Bella has made the song popular among Mongolian youth in summer 2026 gathering interest of the new generation.

== Political career ==
=== Beginnings (2009–16) ===
Uchral joined the Mongolian People's Party (MPP) in 2009 and became an active member of the party's youth wing, the Social Democratic Mongolian Youth Union.

In 2012, he joined the organization's governing board and was appointed as a director of the "Social Democracy" training center. Between 2012 and 2016, he was a citizen's representative of Bayanzurkh district in Ulaanbaatar. He served as a director of the Political Department of the MPP in Ulaanbaatar between 2012 and 2014. Uchral was one of the nominations for deputy cabinet ministers in 2014 but wasn't chosen for a position. Moreover, he supervised the MPP's public relations and media team for the 2012 municipal elections and the 2013 presidential election. In 2015, he worked as a public relations advisor for then Deputy Prime Minister Ukhnaagiin Khurelsukh and was later appointed as an advisor of the MPP caucus in the State Great Khural.

=== Member of Parliament (2016–22) ===
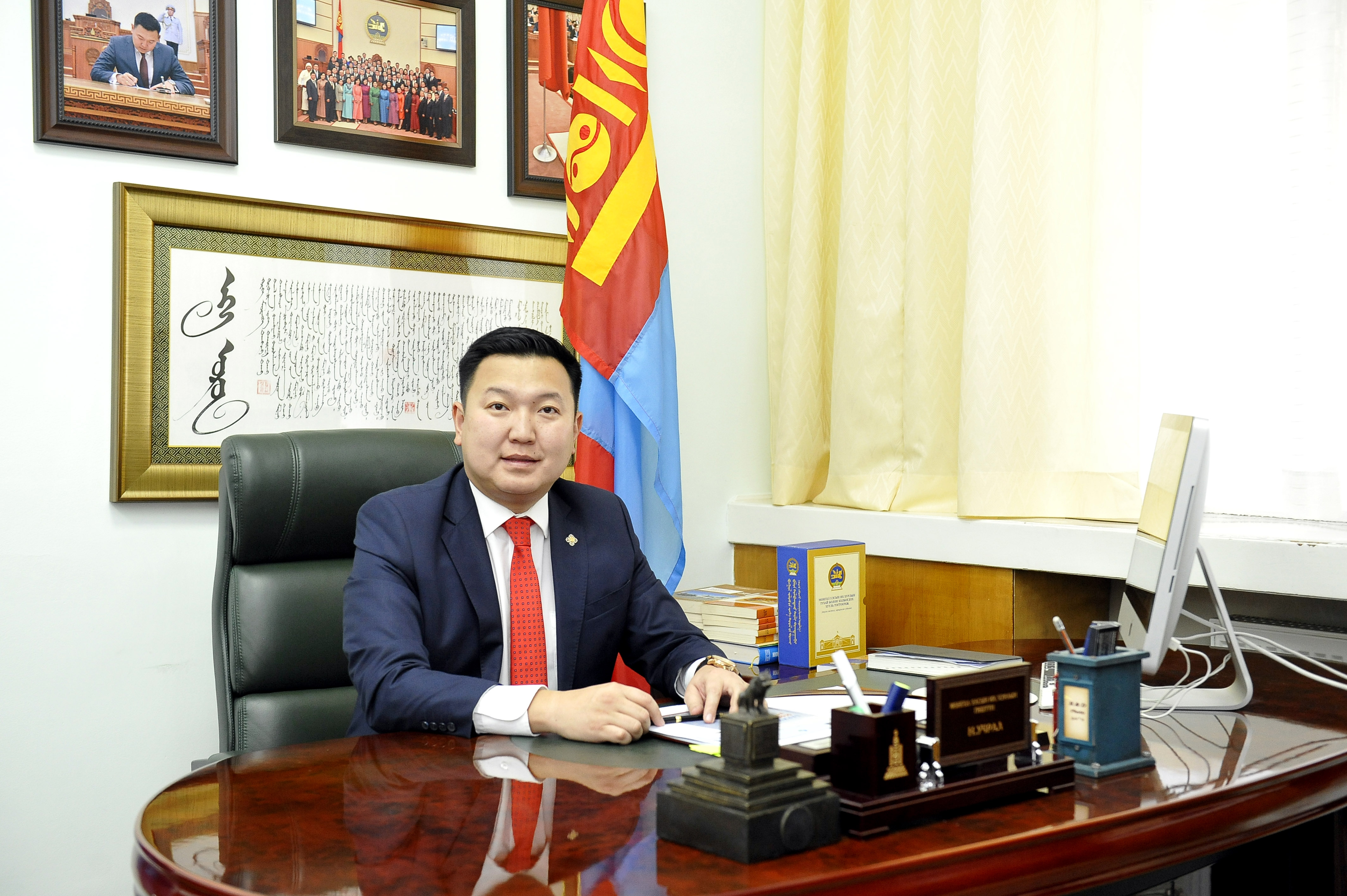
Uchral at his office at the Government Palace, 2017

In the 2016 parliamentary election, Uchral was elected to the State Great Khural from the 72nd Songinokhairkhan district constituency. At the age of 29, he was one of the youngest legislators of the 7th State Great Khural. He was a member of the parliamentary standing committees on Legal Affairs and Social Policy, Education, Culture, and Science. He was also the chairman of a temporary committee on digital policy, which he initiated and created by the State Great Khural in 2017. He led a lobby group for innovation, composed of five MPs.

In the June 2020 parliamentary election, Uchral was re-elected as MP for Songinokhairkhan district.

However, in November 2020, he was hospitalised at the Second State Central Hospital for his severe deteriorating health. In a public statement, his wife, Ch.Selenge, stated his condition is "improving day by day." After two months of hospitalization, he was flown to South Korea for medical care on 5 January 2021. Later, it was reported that Uchral was taken to Germany for further treatment.

In late April 2021, Uchral, physically slimmer, stated on his social media that his condition is improving. Since 20 April 2021, he returned to his work via online meetings during his medical break. Soon after his return to Mongolia, Uchral delivered an online greeting to the public in the final episode of "Quarantine-14", a public broadcasting program during the COVID-19 lockdowns. Uchral later released a memoir called “Эргэн ирсэн минь” (The return) about his fight for his life on hospital beds and his renewed life and political goals.

=== Cabinet minister (2022–25) ===
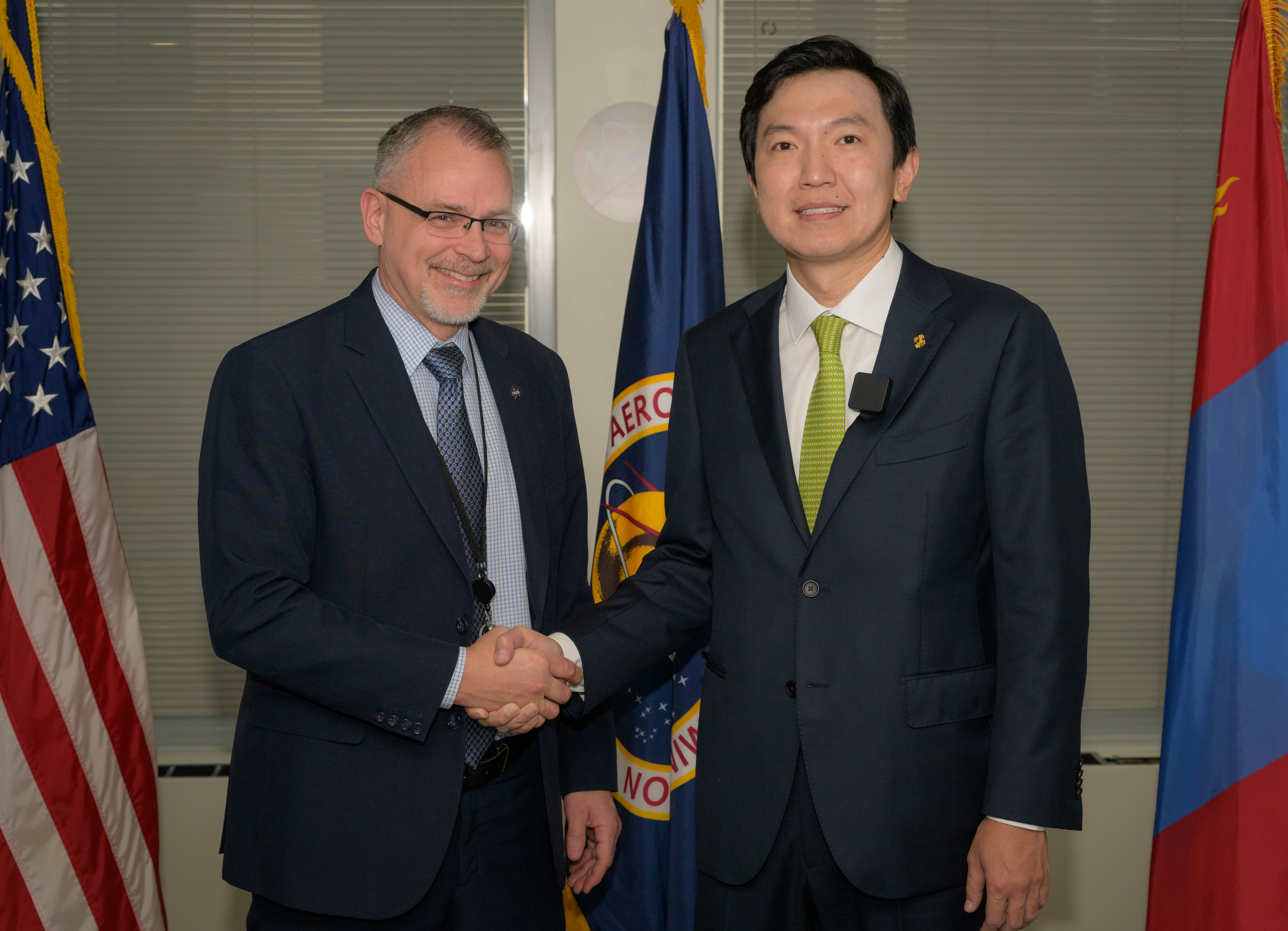
Minister of Digital Development and Communications Uchral with NASA Associate Administrator Jim Free, 26 January 2024

Following a cabinet reshuffle by then-Prime Minister Luvsannamsrain Oyun-Erdene in 2022, Uchral became the first Minister of Digital Development and Communications on 30 August 2022. He served in this position for two years until the next election in July 2024.

In the 2024 parliamentary election, Uchral was elected for the third consecutive time. He was nominated and appointed as government minister and Chief Cabinet Secretary for the second Oyun-Erdene cabinet in July 2024. He served as cabinet minister until June 2025, when youth-led anti-government protests caused Oyun-Erdene to lose a motion of confidence and resign from his post. Oyun-Erdene was succeeded by former speaker, Gombojavyn Zandanshatar, on 10 June 2025.

On 18 June 2025, Zandanshatar formed a coalition government and appointed Uchral as First Deputy Prime Minister of Mongolia, the second-highest cabinet position after the premiership. However, a factional divide arose within the MPP after the downfall of Oyun-Erdene. In September 2025, prime minister Zandanshatar and parliamentary speaker Dashzegviin Amarbayasgalan competed against each other to become the leader of the MPP and disputed the chairmanship elections. Zandanshatar, an unseated lawmaker, needed the political legitimacy to ensure a stable tenure. In the following months, a political crisis occurred, leading to multiple resignations, parliamentary maneuvers, cabinet dismissals, and appointments.

=== Chairman of the MPP (2025–present) ===
At the end of the crisis, both candidates pulled out of the race to maintain party unity. Uchral was consequently overwhelmingly elected the next MPP chairman, succeeding Oyun-Erdene on 15 November. He was also later appointed to the month-vacant position of Chairman of the State Great Khural on 20 November 2025. As chairman of the MPP, Uchral announced the E-4 strategy for party members and introduced the “Four Ways to Freedom” framework. The strategy set out a political and organizational agenda focused on strengthening party discipline and participation, promoting economic opportunity and individual initiative, improving public services and governance, and expanding citizens’ freedoms and rights. Through these initiatives, he sought to align the party’s internal activities with broader national priorities, including economic development, accountable government and the reduction of unnecessary administrative barriers.

=== Speaker of the Parliament (2025–26) ===
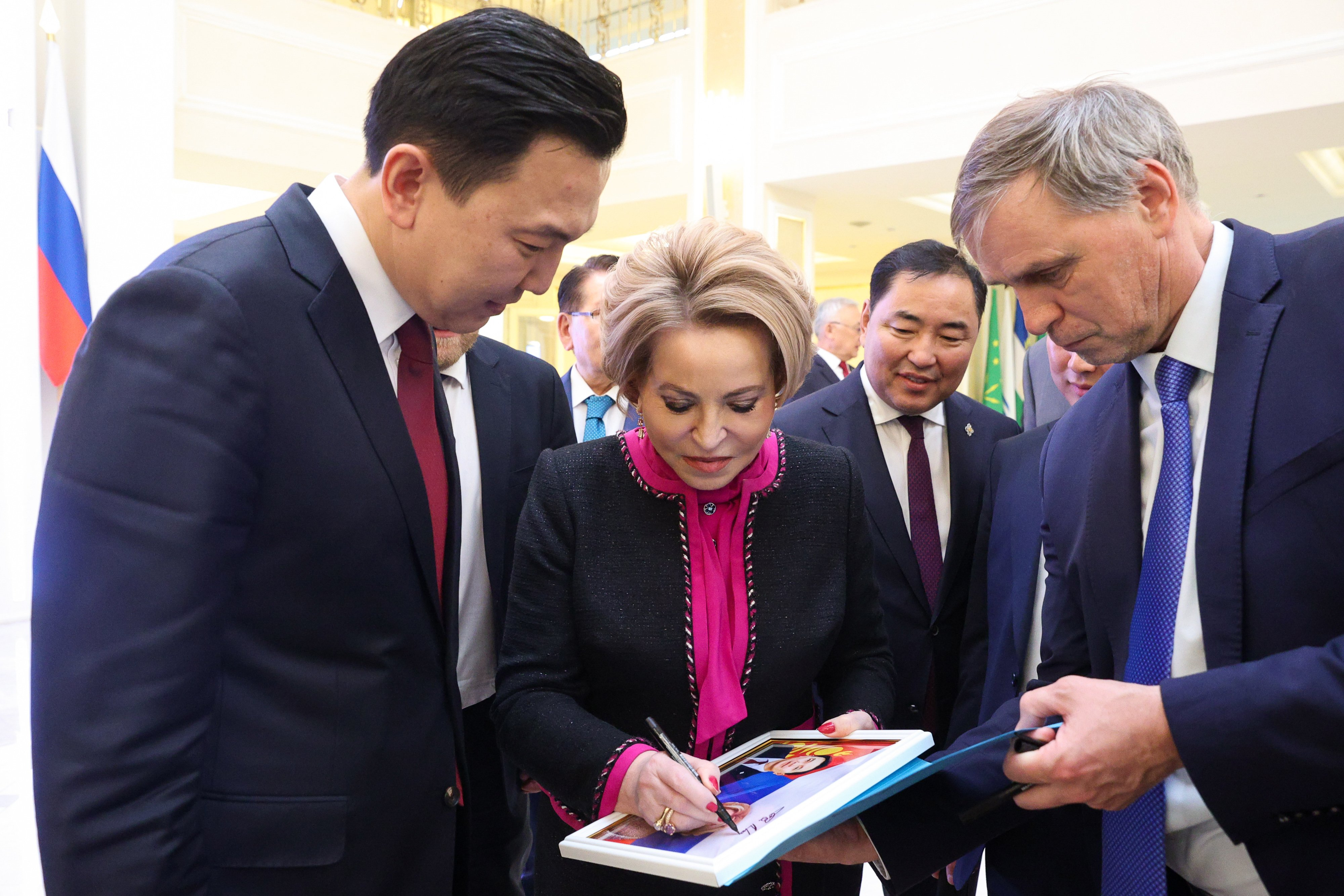
Speaker Uchral with Russian Chairwoman of the Federation Council Valentina Matviyenko, February 2026

Uchral was elected Chairman of the State Great Khural on 20 November 2025, serving in the position until 30 March 2026. During his tenure, he emphasized economic freedom, human rights and the reduction of administrative and regulatory barriers. He launched the “Unlock” national initiative, which sought to review and remove legal and bureaucratic restrictions affecting citizens and businesses. Laws and legislative measures associated with the initiative included amendments expanding the use of notification-based procedures for certain business activities, simplifying requirements for renewable-energy producers, and reducing administrative steps for connecting renewable-energy projects to the electricity grid. He also championed legislation aimed at expanding opportunities for public-private partnerships, including measures shortening project-selection procedures, simplifying approval processes and enabling local governments to approve certain partnership projects. In addition, he promoted greater scrutiny of legislation for its impact on constitutional rights, including the introduction of an artificial-intelligence-based analysis function on Parliament’s D-Parliament public participation platform. Uchral stated that Parliament should place greater emphasis on implementing laws and evaluating whether legislation and public policy produced tangible results.

The nomination of MPP chairman Uchral to the speaker of parliament in late 2025 was met with harsh criticism from the main opposition, the Democratic Party (DP). The leader of the opposition and the Chairman of the DP, Odongiin Tsogtgerel, threatened to boycott all parliamentary procedures due to alleged concentration of power by the MPP. The boycott began in early March 2026 and caused a two-week-long political deadlock in the State Great Khural.

== Prime Minister of Mongolia (since 2026) ==
Following the 2025 party turmoil, renewed opposition boycott, and external economic uncertainties, incumbent prime minister Gombojavyn Zandanshatar submitted his resignation on 27 March 2026 to the ruling party's highest decision-making body and parliament. His resignation was accepted by the State Great Khural on the same day. Party chairman Uchral was among the likely candidates to succeed Zandanshatar.

On 29 March 2026, Uchral was unanimously selected as the MPP's nominee for Prime Minister. His nomination is seen as a move toward political stability and market-oriented reform. As the parliamentary speaker and party chairman, he is following the established convention of the ruling party leader serving as head of government. The following day, on 30 March, he was appointed the 35th Prime Minister of Mongolia by the State Great Khural, with 88 out of the 107 lawmakers voting in favor. In his inaugural speech, Uchral talked about deregulation and market liberalization. He formally succeeded caretaker prime minister Zandanshatar at midnight.

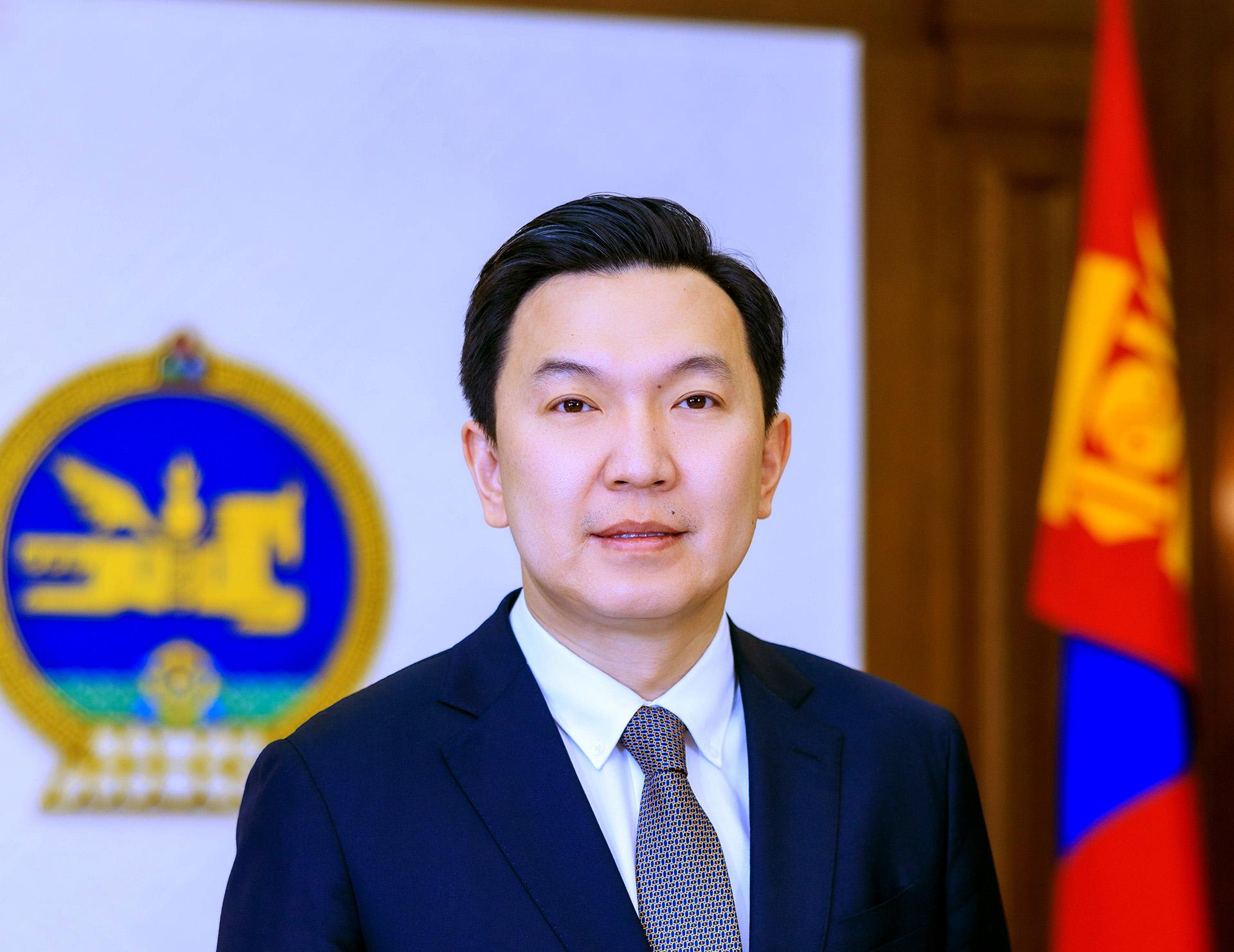
Official portrait as Prime Minister of Mongolia, 2026

On 3 April 2026, Prime Minister Nyam-Osoryn Uchral named his cabinet with a core message of stability, policy continuity, and economic liberation. His coalition government between the MPP, the HUN Party, and the National Coalition retained the previous structure of 19 ministers and included eight incumbents who were reappointed.

As Prime Minister, Uchral launched the “Unlock Mongolia” reform agenda, centered on economic liberalization, reducing administrative barriers, attracting private investment, accelerating the green transition, and reforming the role of the state in the economy. During the first 100 days of his government, the administration reported cancelling 9,376 planned business inspections, digitizing access to 321 permits, and advancing reforms to simplify Mongolia’s licensing and regulatory system.

A major component of the agenda was the Economic Freedom Law, adopted by Parliament in July 2026 together with amendments to related legislation. The reforms sought to reduce the number of activities requiring government authorization, introduce notification-based procedures for lower-risk businesses, simplify the issuance and renewal of permits, and reduce overlapping regulatory requirements. The government also proposed transferring the administration of more than 120 simple permits in several sectors to professional associations and establishing a formal mechanism for resolving investor grievances.

Uchral’s government also pursued tax and investment reforms, including a package of tax amendments that the government estimated would provide approximately ₮3.1 trillion in tax relief, including the elimination of the 2 percent tax previously imposed on real-estate sales. His administration also sought to remove restrictions on foreign investment, strengthen investment protection and facilitate greater participation by foreign financial institutions. In June 2026, the government’s “Unlock the Mongolian Economy” investment meeting brought together more than 120 foreign investors and resulted in six agreements and memoranda valued at a combined US$545 million.

Energy and the green transition formed another part of the government’s reform program. Uchral’s government launched Mongolia’s first competitive auctions for privately financed renewable-energy projects, including solar generation and battery energy-storage projects intended to add new capacity to the electricity system. The government also pursued reforms to expand green lending, encourage household and private-sector participation in renewable energy, develop electric-vehicle charging infrastructure, and gradually reduce Mongolia’s dependence on imported energy and petroleum products.

The government additionally pursued reforms to state-owned enterprises and public administration, including legislation intended to improve the governance of state- and locally-owned companies, reduce inefficient structures and limit competition between state-owned enterprises and the private sector. These measures formed part of Uchral’s broader effort to redefine the government’s role from direct economic participation toward regulation, facilitation and the provision of public services.

== Notes ==
Political offices
Preceded by Gombojavyn Zandanshatar	Prime Minister of Mongolia; 2026–present	Incumbent
Preceded by Dashzegviin Amarbayasgalan	Chairman of the State Great Khural; 2015–2026	Succeeded by Sandagiin Byambatsogt
