= Cabinet Secretariat of Government of Mongolia =

Government office in Mongolia

- Монгол Улсын; Засгийн газрын Хэрэг эрхлэх газар

Agency overview
- Formed: 1992 (Current form)
- Preceding agency: Secretariat of Council of Ministers of the Mongolian People's Republic (1939-1992)
- Jurisdiction: Government of Mongolia
- Headquarters: Government Palace, Sükhbaatar Square 1, 6th Khoroo, Sükhbaatar district, Ulaanbaatar 14201, Mongolia
- Employees: 196
- Agency executives: Dashzegviin Amarbayasgalan, Minister of Mongolia and Chief Cabinet Secretary; Byambajavyn Ganbat, First Deputy Chief Cabinet Secretary; Urgamalyn Byambasüren, Deputy Chief Cabinet Secretary; Daadankhüügiin Batbaatar, Deputy Chief Cabinet Secretary
- Website: cabinet.gov.mn

The Cabinet Secretariat of Government of Mongolia (Mongolian: Монгол Улсын Засгийн газрын Хэрэг эрхлэх газар) is the office of the Government of Mongolia. In its current form, the Cabinet Secretariat was established in 1992 through reorganization of the Secretariat of Government of the Mongolian People's Republic. It is a continuation of the Ministry of Internal Affairs, one of the first five ministries of the Bogd Khanate of Mongolia, established in 1911.

== Functions ==
The Cabinet Secretariat is in charge of processing and implementing Government decisions, provide assistance in regulating state central administrative and local administrative bodies, prepare and submit subject matter received for consideration at the Cabinet meeting, publish Government decisions, dispatch Government decisions to the organizations and officials in charge of implementation, and monitor their performance, receive proposals, petitions and complaints by citizens and organizations addressed to the Government and respond to them.

== Structure ==
The Cabinet Secretariat is organised into the following departments and divisions:

- Department of Sectoral Management and Coordination
- Legal Department
- Department of Local Government Management and Coordination
- Department of Public Administration
  - Division of Archives, Confidentials, and Clerk
  - Division of IT
- Department of Human Resource of the Government
  - Division of Human Resource Administration
  - Division of Research and Analysis
  - Division of Management System Development
- Department of Finance and Economy
- Department of State Protocol

Administratively, belongs to the Cabinet Secretariat but reports to the Prime minister:

- Secretariat of Prime Minister
  - Department of Public and Media Relations
    - Division of Speechwriting
    - Division of Digital Media
    - Division of Periodicals
    - Division of Content Development
    - Division of Foreign News and Advertisement
    - 11-11 call center

Administratively, belongs to the Cabinet Secretariat but reports to the Deputy Prime minister:

- Secretariat of Deputy Prime Minister

== See also ==
- Prime Minister of Mongolia
- Government of Mongolia
