= Deputy Prime Minister of Mongolia =

Deputy Head of Government of Mongolia

- Монгол Улсын Шадар сайд (Mongolian)

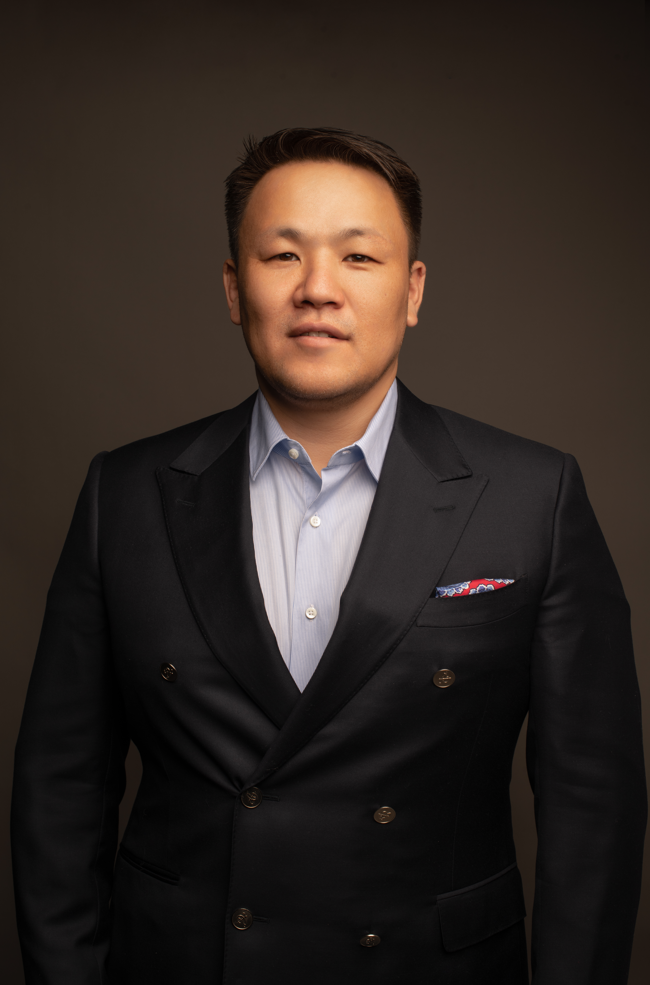
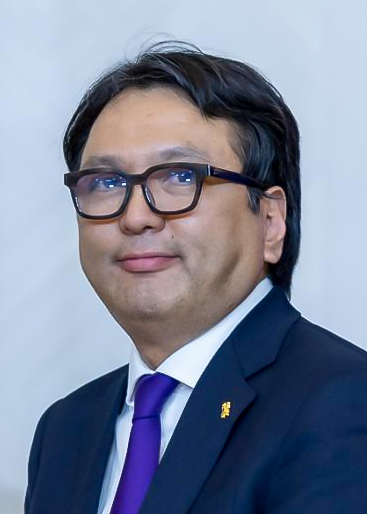
- Incumbent; Regional development and Emergency management: Nyamtaishiryn Nomtoibayar (left) since 4 April 2026; Foreign investment and Public procurement: Togmidyn Dorjkhand (right) since 10 July 2024
- Member of: Government of Mongolia
- Appointer: Prime Minister of Mongolia
- Constituting instrument: Law on the Government of Mongolia
- Precursor: Deputy Chair of the Council of Ministers of the Mongolian People's Republic
- Formation: 1990
- Salary: 47,653,200 ₮/US$ 14,114 annually (2024)

The Deputy Prime Minister of Mongolia is currently the third-highest-ranking position in the Mongolian cabinet. In the event that the Prime Minister, the First Deputy Prime Minister of Mongolia and Minister of Economy and Development are simultaneously temporarily absent, one of the Deputy Prime Ministers shall assume the duties of the Prime Minister upon the Prime Minister's assignment. As a member of the cabinet, the officeholder is appointed and dismissed by the Prime Minister.

== Current deputy prime ministers and their function ==
Currently, there are two Deputy prime ministers in the Government of Mongolia.

Incumbent Deputy Prime Ministers of Mongolia
Office(s)	Name	Took office	Functions
Deputy Prime Minister	Nyamtaishiryn Nomtoibayar; List MP	4 April 2026	Regional development policy; Free zone and special economic zone development policy and planning; Standardization and metrology and conformity assessment accreditation affairs; integrated policy and planning of laboratory activities; Disaster prevention and immediate restoration operation related urgent affairs; Ensuring transparency of government activities; Implement activities related to air pollution reduction.
Deputy Prime Minister	Togmidyn Dorjkhand; List MP	10 July 2024	Procurement of goods and services with state and local funds; Foreign trade and investment policy, regulations and registration; Fair competition encouragement and regulatory and consumer rights protection affairs; Ensuring transparency of government activities; Implement activities related to air pollution reduction.

== List of deputy prime ministers ==
The following people have held the office of Deputy Prime Minister of Mongolia:

Prime Minister	Deputy Prime Minister	Took office	Left office	Party
Dashiin Byambasüren	Choijilsürengiin Pürevdorj	26 September 1990	July 1992	Mongolian People's Revolutionary Party
Dashiin Byambasüren	Dambiin Dorligjav	26 September 1990	July 1992	Mongolian Democratic Party
Puntsagiin Jasrai	Choijilsürengiin Pürevdorj	July 1992	July 1996	Mongolian People's Revolutionary Party
Puntsagiin Jasrai	Lkhamsurengiin Enebish; Until 1993 as Deputy Prime Minister and Minister of Administration	July 1992	July 1996	Mongolian People's Revolutionary Party
Position ceased to exist
Tsakhiagiin Elbegdorj	Chültemiin Ulaan	August 2004	28 January 2006	Mongolian People's Revolutionary Party
Miyeegombyn Enkhbold	Mendsaikhany Enkhsaikhan	28 January 2006	5 December 2007	New National Party
Sanjaagiin Bayar	Miyeegombyn Enkhbold	5 December 2007	12 November 2009	Mongolian People's Revolutionary Party
Sükhbaataryn Batbold	Miyeegombyn Enkhbold	12 November 2009	17 August 2012	Mongolian People's Revolutionary Party since 2010 Mongolian People's Party
Norovyn Altankhuyag	Dendeviin Terbishdagva	20 August 2012	10 December 2014	Justice Coalition
Chimediin Saikhanbileg	Ukhnaagiin Khürelsükh	10 December 2014	6 August 2015	Mongolian People's Party
Chimediin Saikhanbileg	Tserendashiin Oyunbaatar	8 September 2015	23 July 2016	Justice Coalition
Jargaltulgyn Erdenebat	Ukhnaagiin Khürelsükh	23 July 2016	4 October 2017	Mongolian People's Party
Ukhnaagiin Khürelsükh	Ölziisaikhany Enkhtüvshin	18 October 2017	8 July 2020	Mongolian People's Party
Ukhnaagiin Khürelsükh	Yangugiin Sodbaatar	8 July 2020	29 January 2021	Mongolian People's Party
Luvsannamsrain Oyun-Erdene	Sainbuyangiin Amarsaikhan	29 January 2021	10 July 2024	Mongolian People's Party
Luvsannamsrain Oyun-Erdene	Chimediin Khürelbaatar as Deputy Prime Minister and Minister of Economy and Development	5 January 2023	10 July 2024	Mongolian People's Party
Luvsannamsrain Oyun-Erdene	Sainbuyangiin Amarsaikhan	10 July 2024	13 June 2025	Mongolian People's Party
Luvsannamsrain Oyun-Erdene	Togmidyn Dorjkhand	10 July 2024	13 June 2025	HUN Party
Gombojavyn Zandanshatar	Sainbuyangiin Amarsaikhan	18 June 2025	12 November 2025	Mongolian People's Party
Gombojavyn Zandanshatar	Khassuuriin Gankhuyag	12 November 2025	30 March 2026	Mongolian People's Party
Gombojavyn Zandanshatar	Togmidyn Dorjkhand	18 June 2025	30 March 2026	HUN Party
Nyam-Osoryn Uchral	Nyamtaishiryn Nomtoibayar	4 April 2026	Incumbent	National Coalition
Nyam-Osoryn Uchral	Togmidyn Dorjkhand	4 April 2026	Incumbent	HUN Party

== See also ==
- Prime Minister of Mongolia
- Government of Mongolia
