= Prime Minister of Mongolia =

Head of government

- Монгол Улсын Ерөнхий сайд ᠮᠣᠩᠭᠣᠯ ᠤᠯᠤᠰ ᠤᠨ ᠶᠡᠷᠦᠩᠬᠡᠢ ᠰᠠᠶᠢᠳ
- State emblem of Mongolia

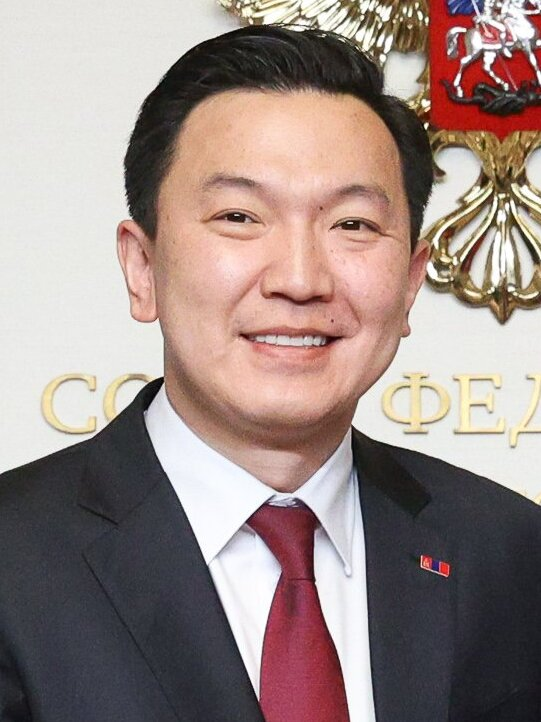
- Incumbent; Nyam-Osoryn Uchral since 30 March 2026
- Executive branch of Mongolia
- Type: Head of government Historical: De facto Head of state
- Member of: National Security Council
- Seat: Government Palace, Ulaanbaatar
- Nominator: President
- Appointer: State Great Khural
- Term length: 4 years; renewable
- Constituting instrument: Constitution of Mongolia
- Precursor: Prime Minister of the Mongolian People's Republic
- Formation: November 1912; 11 September 1990
- First holder: Tögs-Ochiryn Namnansüren (1912); Dashiin Byambasüren (1990)
- Deputy: First Deputy Prime Minister of Mongolia
- Salary: ₮62,102,880 / US$18,393 annually (2024)

The prime minister of Mongolia (Note: Mongolian: Монгол Улсын Ерөнхий Сайд, romanized: Mongol Ulsiin Yörönkhii Said, pronounced [mɔ́ɴɢəɮ ʊɮsíːɴ jɵrəŋxíː sɛ́ːt]; In the Mongolian script: ᠮᠣᠩᠭᠣᠯ ᠤᠯᠤᠰ ᠤᠨ ᠶᠡᠷᠦᠩᠬᠡᠢ ᠰᠠᠶᠢᠳ) is the head of government of Mongolia. Under the Constitution of Mongolia, the State Great Khural appoints the Prime Minister upon the President’s submission of a candidate nominated by the parliamentary majority. The Prime Minister shall be dismissed if no fewer than one-fourth of the members of the State Great Khural formally submit a proposal for the Prime Minister’s dismissal and a majority of all members approve it, or if a resolution expressing confidence in the Prime Minister is not adopted. The incumbent prime minister is Nyam-Osoryn Uchral, who succeeded Gombojavyn Zandanshatar on 30 March 2026, following his resignation three days earlier.

== Roles and responsibilities ==
The prime minister holds the authority to hire and dismiss Cabinet ministers and is responsible for appointing the governors of the 21 aimags of Mongolia, as well as the governor of the capital city, Ulaanbaatar. Additionally, the Prime Minister plays a crucial role in shaping domestic policy and directing the government’s legislative agenda. The appointment of key figures in the government, such as the head of various state agencies and ministries, also falls within the Prime Minister’s scope of influence.

In the case of political reforms, the prime minister's decisions can significantly impact governance structures at both the national and provincial levels, reflecting the centralization of executive power within Mongolia's political system. This concentration of authority can, at times, lead to calls for decentralization, as various political actors advocate for more autonomy in decision-making at the regional level.

== History ==
The office of the Prime Minister was established by the Bogd Khanate of Mongolia in 1912, shortly after Outer Mongolia first declared independence from the Manchu Qing dynasty. This was not recognized by many nations in the 1910s. By the time of Mongolia's second (and more generally recognized) declaration of independence from the occupation by Beiyang China in 1921, the office was controlled by the Mongolian People's Party.

In 1924, after the death of the Bogd Khan, the party established the Mongolian People's Republic, and the prime minister's post was superseded by the post of Chairman of the Council of People's Commissars, an institution similar to those in many other Soviet republics at the time. This was later changed to the Chairman of the Council of Ministers in 1939. The title of prime minister was only revived in 1990, when the sole ruling party gradually released its hold on power after the 1990 Democratic Revolution. Regardless of the name changes, however, the modern Mongolian government recognizes the office as having existed continuously since 1912 and counts all holders of the office as prime ministers.

There is some confusion as to the first holder of the office. Da Lam Tserenchimed held office as "prime minister" (actually the Interior minister) during a provisional government from 1911 to 1912 and is sometimes cited as the first holder of the modern office. However, the Mongolian government considers Tögs-Ochiryn Namnansüren, the first formal officeholder, to be the first. There is also some confusion over the status of Tsengeltiin Jigjidjav; some consider him to have been only acting Prime Minister, while others consider him to have been a full Prime Minister. The Mongolian government takes the latter view.

== See also ==
- President of Mongolia
- List of prime ministers of Mongolia
- Government of Mongolia
