= 2027 Mongolian presidential election =

- By March 2027
Party	MPP	Democratic	HUN
Party	Civil Will-Green	National Coalition
Incumbent President
Sandagiin Byambatsogt (acting)
MPP

Presidential elections are expected to be held in Mongolia in early 2027, usually within the first half of June, as stated by Article 8 of the Law on Mongolian Presidential Election. It will be the ninth presidential election since Mongolia's democratization in 1990. The election was brought forward following incumbent president Ukhnaagiin Khurelsukh's resignation over an unproven kickback claim.

Under the Constitution of Mongolia, Khürelsükh is ineligible for reelection.

== Electoral system ==
The President of Mongolia is elected for a six-year term using the two-round system; if no candidate receives a majority (50% + 1) of the vote in the first round, a run-off is held between the top two candidates. If no candidate receives a majority of all votes cast in the second round, fresh elections will be held. In order to be registered to contest the election, a candidate must be an indigenous Mongolian citizen, be at least 50 years old on the day of the election, and have permanently resided in Mongolia for at least five years. Political parties with representation in the State Great Khural (parliament) are allowed to nominate candidates. Before the 2019 constitutional amendments, the presidential term was four years, renewable once.

== Candidates ==
According to Article 5 of the Law on Mongolian Presidential Election, political parties with representation in the State Great Khural can nominate one candidate for the election. As of March 2026, there are 4 political parties and 1 electoral alliance in the 9th State Great Khural eligible for presidential nomination: the ruling Mongolian People's Party, the Democratic Party, the HUN Party, the Civil Will–Green Party, and the National Coalition.

=== Mongolian People's Party ===
==== Speculated by the media ====
Media reports have speculated that the following individuals may run for president as candidate of the Mongolian People’s Party:

- Gombojavyn Zandanshatar, Prime Minister of Mongolia (2025–2026), Chairman of the State Great Khural (2019–2024)
- Yangugiin Sodbaatar, Secretary-General of the Mongolian People's Party (since 2024)
- Jadambyn Enkhbayar, member of the State Great Khural, First Deputy Prime Minister (since 2025)
- Sandagiin Byambatsogt, Chairman of the State Great Khural (since 2026), Chief Cabinet Secretary (2025–2026)
- Sainbuyangiin Amarsaikhan, member of the State Great Khural, Deputy Prime Minister (2021–2025)

=== Democratic Party ===
==== Declared candidates ====
Individuals who have expressed an interest in running for party primary
Luvsannyamyn Gantömör	Norovyn Altankhuyag	Dashdondogiin Ganbat
Member of the State Great Khural (2004–2016, 2024–present); First Deputy Prime Minister of Mongolia (2024–2025); Chairman of the Democratic Party (2023–2025)	Member of the State Great Khural (1996–2000, 2008–2016, 2020–present); Prime Minister of Mongolia (2012–2014); Chairman of the Democratic Party (2008–2014)	Member of the State Great Khural (2012–2016, 2020–present)

- Luvsannyamyn Gantömör, First Deputy Prime Minister (2024–2025); member of the State Great Khural (2004–2016; 2024–present); chairperson of the Democratic Party (2023–2025). In an interview published by Ödriin Sonin on February 25, 2026, he stated that he would run in the party primary.
- Norovyn Altankhuyag, Prime Minister of Mongolia (2012–2014); First Deputy Prime Minister (2008–2014); member of the State Great Khural (1996–2000; 2008–2016; 2020–present). He was chairperson of the Democratic Party from 2008 to 2014. On February 26, 2026, he announced that he would run in the DP primary for the 2027 presidential election.
- Dashdondogiin Ganbat, member of the State Great Khural (2012–2016; 2020–present). He announced his candidacy on September 21, 2026, following full endorsement from the "Democratic Revival" faction in the DP.

==== Speculated by the news media ====
News reports have speculated that the following individuals may run for president as candidate of the Democratic Party:

- Sangajavyn Bayartsogt, Minister of Finance (2008–2012), Chief Cabinet Secretary (2014–2016).
- Bökhchuluuny Pürevdorj, Deputy Chairman of the State Great Khural since 2024, member of the State Great Khural (2016–present).
- Khishigdembereliin Temüüjin, member of the State Great Khural (2008–2016, 2024–present), Minister of Justice (2012-2014).
- Sainkhüügiin Ganbaatar, member of the State Great Khural (2012–2016, 2020–present), candidate of the Mongolian People's Revolutionary Party in the 2017 presidential election.

=== HUN Party ===
During the Lkhagvyn TOIM talk show, party chair Togmidyn Dorjkhand announced that the party would organize a public vote campaign to select its candidate, similar to the process used by the Right Person Electorate Coalition to choose its candidate for the 2021 presidential election.

=== Civil Will–Green Party ===
==== Potential candidates ====
Potential candidates
Batyn Batbaatar	Sanjaadorjiin Molor-Erdene
Member of the State Great Khural (2004–2008, 2024–present); Minister of Environment and Climate Change (2025–2026); Chairman of the Civil Will–Green Party (since 2023)	Philosopher, public intellectual, lecturer

- Batyn Batbaatar, Minister of Environment and Climate Change (2025–2026); member of the State Great Khural (2004–2008; 2024–present); leader of the Civil Will–Green Party (since 2023). On March 09, 2026, at the party's 26th anniversary conference, he stated that he's ready to stand as presidential candidate. However, the same day, several party members organized an extraordinary party congress and replaced him with MP Rinchindorjiin Batbold. The dispute was legally resolved on July 02, 2026 when the Supreme Court registered the party's new charter (previously rejected four times) and refused to register Batbold as chair.
- Sanjaadorjiin Molor-Erdene, philosopher, public intellectual, writer, and lecturer who previously ran as CWGP candidate of Khan Uul in 2024. In August 2026, he publicly announced his candidacy for the presidential election from the Civil Will–Green Party. However, on September 2, 2026, Molor-Erdene was investigated by the Ministry of Justice and Internal Affairs for undermining national unity and was detained for a period of one month. The decision came after a public outcry from a resurfaced interview of him. He was released with a ban on travel on 29 September 2026. Some media outlets suspected the detainment of being related to his presidential bid.

=== National Coalition ===
The National Coalition, headed by Deputy Prime Minister Nyamtaishiryn Nomtoibayar, is eligible for presidential candidacy. Coalition leader Nomtoibayar, born in 1978, cannot run due to the presidential age limit. There have been informal talks regarding the coalition's possible merger with the MPP, which has been confirmed by Nomtoibayar, a former MPP member, in September 2026. However, this potential merger has not materialized in a formal matter as of late 2026.

==== Speculated by the news media ====
News reports have speculated that the following individuals may run for president as candidate of the National Coalition:

- Byambaagiin Nyamtaishir, well-known businessman, founder of Mongolyn Alt (MAK) Corporation, and father of coalition leader Nyamtaishiryn Nomtoibayar.

== Declined to be candidates ==
The following individuals have publicly denied interest in being a candidate:

- Togmidyn Dorjkhand, leader of the HUN Party (2021–present), member of the State Great Khural (2020–present), Deputy Prime Minister of Mongolia (2024–present) - On January 28, 2026, during the Lkhagvyn TOIM talk show, he stated that he has no intention to run for president as he would lead his party in the 2028 parliamentary election.
- Sanjaasürengiin Oyun (Civil Will–Green Party), Director of External Affairs of the Green Climate Fund (2018–present) - On February 05, 2026, party chair Batbaatar announced he had suggested former party leader Oyun to run for the President. On February 06, 2026, Oyun said she would not stand for election but would support a female candidate.
- Batmönkhiin Battsetseg (Mongolian People's Party), Minister of Foreign Affairs (2021–present), member of the State Great Khural (2024–present) - On February 11, 2026, she said that she has no intention of running for President, but rather that she will carry out her duty well as a parliament member and minister.
- Zandaakhüügiin Enkhbold (Democratic Party), Chairman of the State Great Khural (2012–2016) - In an interview with the Ödriin Sonin daily newspaper, he announced that he will not run for the 2027 and 2028 elections.
- Erdeniin Bat-Üül (Democratic Party), Mayor of Ulaanbaatar (2012–2016), Hero of Mongolia (2009) - On March 12, 2026, he explained that if he were to run, he would only run for Mayor of Ulaanbaatar.
- Rinchinnyamyn Amarjargal (Democratic Party), Prime Minister of Mongolia (1999–2000), member of the State Great Khural (1996–2000, 2004–2016) - On April 22, 2026, during the Lkhagvyn TOIM talk show, he stated that he had no intention of running for president.

== Opinion polling ==
Open-ended question surveys, conducted by National Opinion from March to August 2026, showed former prime minister Gombojavyn Zandanshatar and Norovyn Altankhuyag firmly leading as possible candidates of their respective parties. The polling firm conducted a hypophetical poll in September 2026, in which 25.9% chose Altankhuyag, slightly higher than Zandanshatar who garnered 24.1% support. Third party candidates—Togmidyn Dorjkhand, Byambaagiin Nyamtaishir, and Sanjaadorjiin Molor-Erdene—received below than 3% support while a large portion of participants (38.8%) hadn't decided on a candidate.

In a polling conducted by MEC barometer from September 4 to 14, 2026, Gombojavyn Zandanshatar and Norovyn Altankhuyag each drew 37% support as their parties' possible nominees, with no other tested name above 20%.
