= 2025 Mongolian political crisis =

Political crisis in Mongolia

- Part of the aftermath of the 2025 Mongolian protests
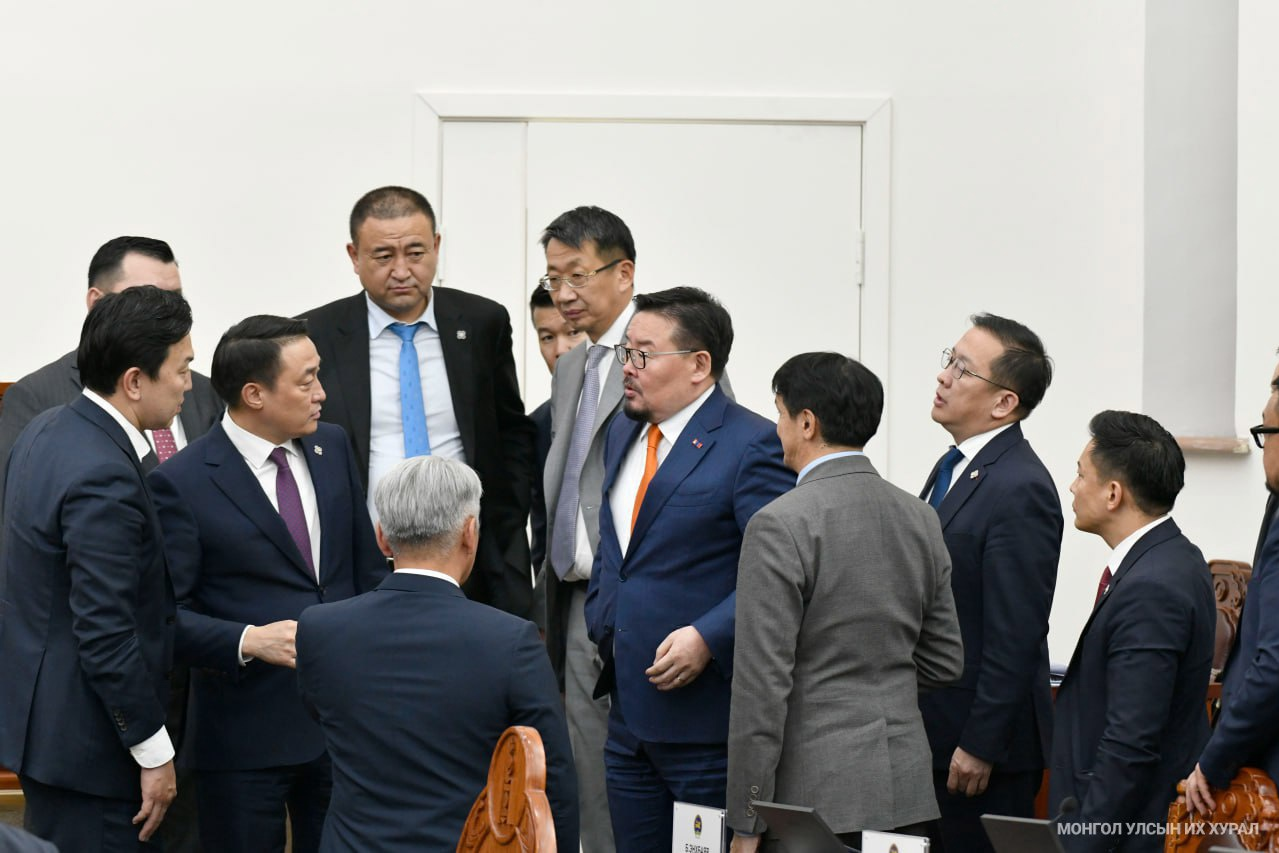
- Dashzegviin Amarbayasgalan (with purple tie) on the left, and Gombojavyn Zandanshatar (with orange tie) on the right
- Date: 27 September 2025 – 11 November 2025 (1 month and 15 days)
- Location: Mongolia
- Caused by: Resignation of prime minister Luvsannamsrain Oyun-Erdene; Factional divide along generational divisions in the ruling Mongolian People's Party; Leadership feud for the next party chairman of the MPP; Aftermath of the 2022 Coal theft scandal
- Result: New MPP leadership; Parliamentary vote on 17 October; Resignation of Dashzegviin Amarbayasgalan as speaker; Gombojavyn Zandanshatar dismissed as Prime Minister of Mongolia; President Ukhnaagiin Khurelsukh vetoes the motion on October 20; Zandanshatar remains prime minister; Constitutional Court rules the motion unconstitutional on October 23; Resignation of Khurelbaataryn Bulgantuya as deputy speaker; Cabinet reshuffle; Nyam-Osoryn Uchral elected the next MPP chairman and speaker of parliament; Parliamentary opposition by the Democratic Party

Parties
Opposition: Democratic Party; National Coalition	Amarbayasgalan camp: Mongolian People's Party	Zandanshatar government: HUN Party; Civil Will–Green Party; Zandanshatar camp: Mongolian People's Party

Lead figures
Luvsannyamyn Gantömör; Odongiin Tsogtgerel; Nyamtaishiryn Nomtoibayar	Dashzegviin Amarbayasgalan; Luvsannamsrain Oyun-Erdene; Sainbuyangiin Amarsaikhan	Gombojavyn Zandanshatar; Ukhnaagiin Khurelsukh; Nyam-Osoryn Uchral; Yangugiin Sodbaatar

In 2025, Mongolia underwent a political crisis caused by a leadership feud within the ruling Mongolian People's Party (MPP). The feud arose in the aftermath of the 2025 Mongolian protests and subsequent resignation of Prime Minister Luvsannamsrain Oyun-Erdene, who served as the Chairman of the MPP since 2021. The MPP, with 68 seats in the State Great Khural since 2024, had an emerging factional divide between conservative members born in the 1970s and reformist members born in the 1980s. He lost a motion of confidence (44-38) on 3 June, in which the opposition Democratic Party (DP) lawmakers refused to participate.

Former parliamentary speaker, Gombojavyn Zandanshatar, was nominated as the next prime minister by President Ukhnaagiin Khürelsükh on 10 June. He was subsequently appointed by the State Great Khural on 13 June. However, a successor to Oyun-Erdene as the next MPP chairperson would not be named until the party's September conference. According to the party charter, the party chairman is designated to assume the role of prime minister when possible.

The ensuing tensions between the two camps led by Oyun-Erdene and Khürelsükh reached their height during the MPP Congress on 27 and 28 September. Dashzegviin Amarbayasgalan, a long-term ally of Oyun-Erdene, and PM Zandanshatar, a long-term ally of Khürelsükh, both ran for the chairmanship elections. Both sides contested the election results, ultimately leading to a leadership battle and political crisis that lasted 1 month and 15 days. The crisis came to an end on November 11, when Nyam-Osoryn Uchral, the First Deputy Prime Minister, was overwhelmingly voted in as the next party chairman. He was officially registered by the Supreme Court as the successor to Oyun-Erdene on November 15 and subsequently sworn in to the month-long vacant speaker's office on November 20.

The election of MPP leader Uchral to the speaker's office later led to a parliamentary boycott by the DP starting in March 2026. After two weeks of parliamentary gridlock, Prime Minister Zandanshatar resigned on 27 March and was succeeded by Uchral three days later.

== Background ==
=== 2025 June protests ===
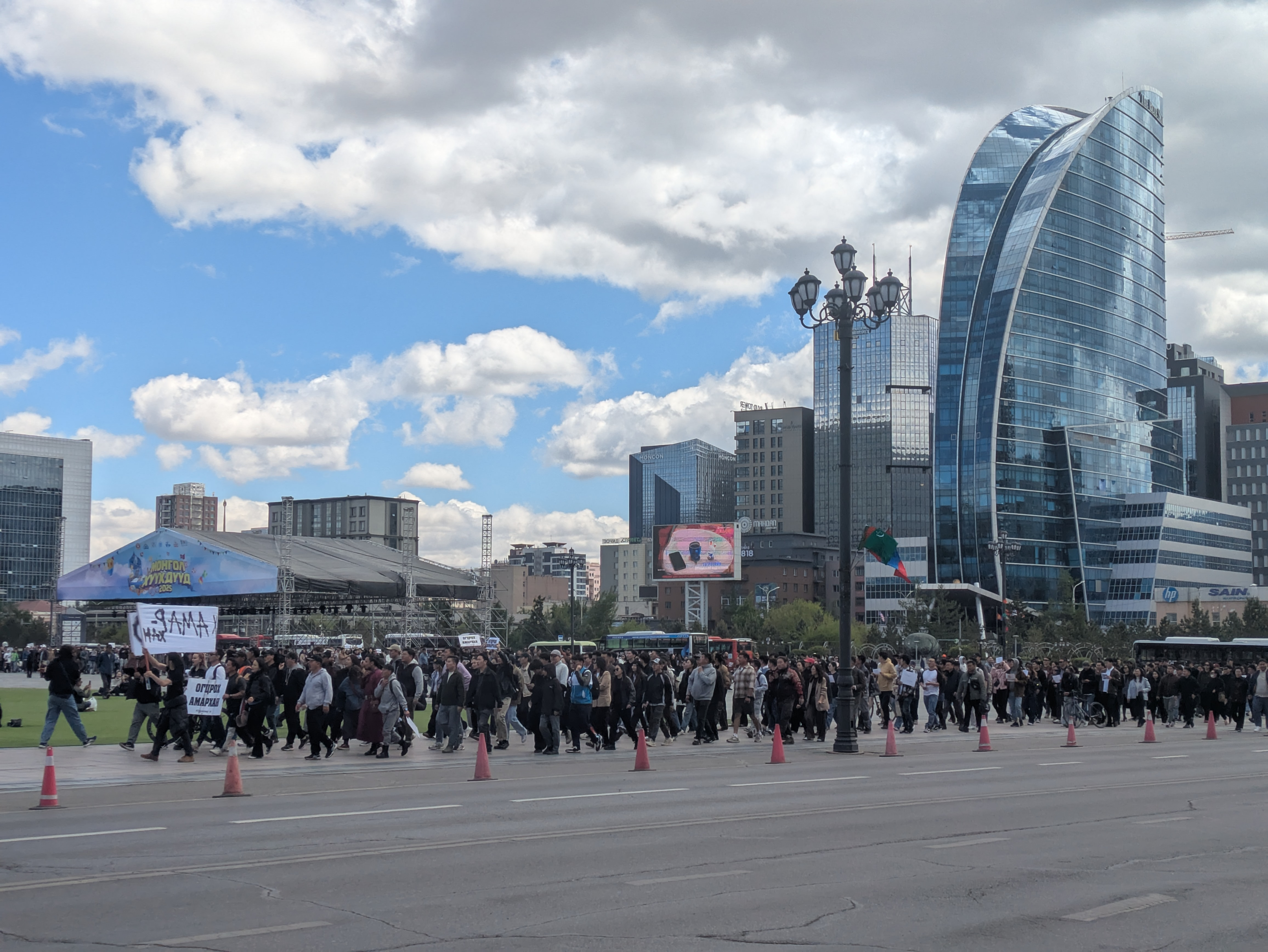
Protestors at Sükhbaatar Square on 2 June 2025

On 14 May 2025, a series of youth-led anti-government demonstrations against Prime Minister Luvsannamsrain Oyun-Erdene began in Ulaanbaatar. These demonstrations occurred amid a broader public frustration against Oyun-Erdene, who, by then, had become the longest-serving prime minister of Mongolia; and his coalition government between the MPP, the Democratic Party (DP), and the HUN Party (HUN), formed in July 2024. In early 2025, reports emerged about Oyun-Erdene's 23-year-old son, Temuulen, and his extravagant lifestyle, with his fiancée featuring luxury designer handbags, high-end rings, and helicopter rides. The viral sensations led to Oyun-Erdene being accused of corruption for wealth exceeding that of a civil servant.

An online petition, calling for Oyun-Erdene's resignation and accountability, was signed by 59,000 people in a matter of weeks. The "It's easy to resign" (Огцрох амархан) protests eventually focused on broader concerns of corruption, inequality, and economic hardship, and demanded that Oyun-Erdene and his cabinet resign and take accountability. Several lawmakers from the DP expressed support for the protestors and engaged in the demonstrations. This promptly led the MPP to expel the DP from the coalition government for "violating" the memorandum of understanding on 21 May.

==== Government collapse ====
On 28 May, the Standing Committee on State Structure of 23 MPs discussed the matter of a motion of confidence. Ultimately, voting via secret ballot, in which 17 of the 23 committee members supported the confidence vote proposal, passed the proposal over to the State Great Khural for discussion.

On 2 June, the vote of confidence was stated to require support from 64 out of the total 126 MPs. 19 MPs were absent from the vote; the turnout for the parliamentary session was 117. During the parliamentary session, President Ukhnaagiin Khürelsükh made a surprise visit and addressed parliament live. In his speech, he stated, "Don't be attached to the small position you hold," a line believed to be an address to Oyun-Erdene. Shortly after, a meeting by the DP caucus promptly led to the effective withdrawal of DP lawmakers from the motion. This led to the number of MPs in session to drop from 117 to 82.

Out of the 82 MPs, 44 voted via secret ballot in favour of Oyun-Erdene, whilst 38 voted against. Failing to meet the required majority of 64, Oyun-Erdene resigned shortly after, on the night of 3 June. With him, his 100-day-old coalition government collapsed. He served as caretaker until a successor was appointed within 30 days by the president and parliament.

Motion of confidence
Ballot →	3 June 2025
Required majority →	64 out of 126 ✗ 20
Votes in favour	44 / 126
Votes against	38 / 126
Absentees (Note: Since a majority of the entire membership is required, those who are absent or do not cast a ballot are de facto voting against.)	44 / 126
Source: Ikon

==== Zandanshatar government ====
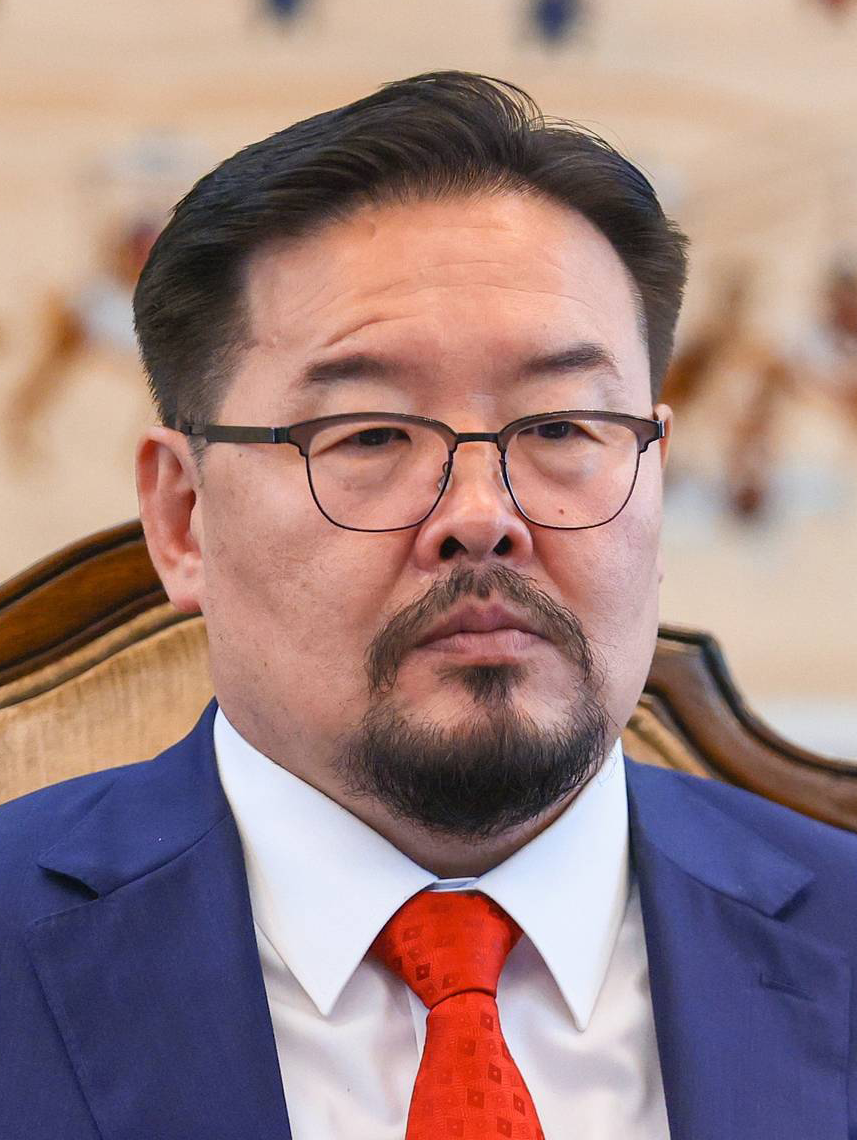
34th Prime Minister Gombojavyn Zandanshatar, 2022

Former parliamentary speaker and incumbent chief of the Office of the President, Gombojavyn Zandanshatar, was nominated by President Khürelsükh on 10 June. He was unanimously approved by the State Great Khural (108-9) to assume the role of prime minister on 12 June, and was sworn in the next day. A new coalition government comprising the MPP, the HUN, and the Civil Will–Green Party (CWGP) was unveiled by Zandanshatar on 18 June, with majority ministers being born in the seventies. One of the issues Zandanshatar promised to focus on was the budgetary issue. His government unveiled various austerity measures and government cuts to reduce fiscal deficit.

== Events ==
=== MPP chairmanship elections ===
Internal elections for the MPP chairmanship were scheduled to occur in September 2025 during the party's General Assembly. Historically, many of Mongolia's prime ministers held the role of party leader for political stability. PM Zandanshatar, who was one of the few prominent figures unseated in 2024, had a relatively weak political mandate after securing the premiership in June. The possibility of a non-allied contender ascending to the party leadership posed a possible threat to Zandanshatar's tenure.

==== First round ====
Results of the first round on 27 September 2026
1. Dashzegviin Amarbayasgalan 240 (50.3%)
2. Gombojavyn Zandanshatar 188 (39.4%)
3. Absent 49 (10.3%)

On 27 September, the eighth General Assembly of the MPP convened to nominate a successor to Oyun-Erdene. Both Amarbayasgalan and Zandanshatar ran in the chairmanship elections. Prior to the election, the counting committee stated, "if no candidate were to receive two-thirds of the vote, the candidates with the most votes were to compete in a second round." In the first round, Amarbayasgalan received 56.1% of the vote whilst Zandanshatar received 44%. Zandanshatar asked for a hand recount, the latter of which "hardly differed" from the results. In response, Zandanshatar's supporters boycotted the second round and withdrew from the voting process, arguing "there should be no procedure exceeding the party charter."

Candidate	Votes	%
Dashzegviin Amarbayasgalan	240	56.1%
Gombojavyn Zandanshatar	188	43.9%
Total	428	100.0%
Turnout	477	80.0%
Source: Ikon

==== Second round ====
Results of the second round on 28 September 2026
1. Dashzegviin Amarbayasgalan 275 (57.7%)
2. Gombojavyn Zandanshatar 46 (9.64%)
3. Absent 156 (32.7%)

In the second round of voting on 28 September, Amarbayasgalan secured 85.67% of the vote from 321 party members. According to Amarbayasgalan, Zandanshatar himself proposed to establish a dual chairmanship, to which he declined and condemned as "undemocratic" during a press conference. The official results of the election were disputed. Consequently, the final decision was to be made during the MPP Congress, which was scheduled to take place on 15-16 November.

Candidate	Votes	%
Dashzegviin Amarbayasgalan	275	85.67%
Gombojavyn Zandanshatar	46	14.33%
Total	321	100.0%
Turnout	477	67.3%
Source: Ikon

=== Party turmoil ===
Zandanshatar accused Amarbayasgalan of being involved in the coal theft scandal and appointed Battumuriin Enkhbayar (MPP) as Minister of Justice and Internal Affairs to investigate Amarbayasgalan's involvement in the coal theft scandal of 2022. Subsequently, the party revoked Enkhbayar's membership. In the ensuing chaos, seven MPP lawmakers threatened to leave the party if the decision was not reversed.

Similar to the MPP's division between Miyeegombyn Enkhbold and Khürelsükh in 2017, which led to the downfall of PM Jargaltulgyn Erdenebat, MPP lawmakers were effectively split into two groups: 32 supporting Amarbayasgalan and 33 supporting Zandanshatar. This intraparty factionalism, however, lacked ideological differences and was primarily motivated by personal allegiances. On 14 October 2025, during an extraordinary MPP parliamentary caucus meeting, 36 lawmakers on the side of Zandanshatar dismissed party caucus leader Jadambyn Bat-Erdene. The next day, Bat-Erdene, during a press conference, stated decisions made during the meeting were invalid due to the absence of the caucus leader. However, the same day, the lawmakers re-met and appointed MP Jigjidiin Batjargal as the successor leader.

=== 2026 budget ===
With the opening of the fall session of the State Great Khural, discussions for the draft Law on the State Budget for 2026 arose prior to the crisis in early September. The MPP leadership feud complicated proceedings. After Amarbayasgalan's victory, the simultaneous tensions between the parliamentary speaker and the prime minister created overlapping executive legislative friction within the same ruling party. Opposition voices from the DP raised concerns about parliamentary procedural delays and lack of oversight for the 2026 budget.

To maintain fiscal discipline, expenditures were cut by MNT 990.17 billion and capital outlays by MNT 361.14 billion. Savings were redirected toward priority infrastructure, especially road transport, and projects aligned with the 2026 Development Plan of Mongolia. Despite the political turmoil, there were no major substantive policy differences between the MPP factions on the budget itself.

During the height of the crisis in October, public school teachers and doctors from Mongolia's only national trade union center, Confederation of Mongolian Trade Unions, went on strike. During a week-long strike, teachers demanded that the government raise the basic salary to MNT 3.5 million due to economic hardship and overcrowding in public schools.

== Crisis ==
On 17 October 2025, along with Amarbayasgalan's resignation as speaker, Zandanshatar was dismissed as prime minister in a parliamentary vote, with 40 votes supporting him and 71 opposing. His tenure lasted for 125 days, which made him the shortest-serving prime minister in Mongolia's modern history. He was to remain as caretaker prime minister until a successor was chosen by the president and the State Great Khural within 30 days.

Motion to support the proposal to dismiss the prime minister
Ballot →	17 October 2025
Required majority →	56 out of 111 ✓ 15
Votes in favour	71 / 126
Votes against	40 / 126
Absentees	15 / 126
Source: Ubn

However, many opposition lawmakers and lawyers noted that the motion, overseen by deputy speaker Khürelbaataryn Bulgantuya (MPP), was passed with procedural errors that were "unconstitutional." A formal complaint was soon submitted to the Constitutional Court of Mongolia against the parliamentary process. Between 17 and 20 October, two of the three members of the National Security Council were vacant.

On 20 October, Zandanshatar's removal was vetoed by President Khürelsükh, citing procedural errors. Soon, on 23 October, the Constitutional Court ruled that the motion passed by parliament was unconstitutional and had no legal basis. Both the procedural conduct of the parliamentary session and the resolution on the dismissal of Zandanshatar were thereby ruled inconsistent with the Constitution of Mongolia. Following the decision, Khürelsükh rescinded his veto. Deputy chairwoman Bulgantuya was called to resign by opposition lawmakers for violating the constitution and was dismissed by the MPP caucus on 30 October. Later that day, MPP caucus leader Batjargal was officially sworn in and received his seal from Bat-Erdene, who was nominated as deputy speaker. Bat-Erdene officially succeeded Bulgantuya on 12 November.

=== Cabinet reshuffle ===
Following the continuation of Zandanshatar cabinet, Enkhbayar was officially appointed and inaugurated as justice minister on 26 October. Three days later, Deputy Prime Minister Sainbuyangiin Amarsaikhan (MPP) announced that he would be resigning from the cabinet, stating that "the current government undermines the foundations of democracy and civil liberties." During a cabinet meeting that day, he was officially dismissed by Zandanshatar for allegedly violating his responsibilities as minister. Amarsaikhan was one of the 71 MPs who voted to dismiss the prime minister on 17 October. He was replaced by Khassuuriin Gankhuyag on 12 November.

Amidst the crisis, the 2026 state budget was finally approved by the State Great Khural on 13 November.

=== 31st Party Congress ===
Results of the MPP chairmanship elections on 15 November 2026
1. Nyam-Osoryn Uchral 1,974 (94.6%)
2. Baatarjavyn Lkhagvajav 105 (5.03%)
3. Invalid 7 (0.34%)

On 11 November, Zandanshatar withdrew his candidacy from the upcoming MPP chairmanship election to "prioritize national stability and interests." Nyam-Osoryn Uchral, the First Deputy Prime Minister, was elected the next party chairman unanimously during the 31st Party Congress of the MPP on 15 November. Later, on 20 November, Uchral was nominated as the next speaker of parliament. Prior to Uchral's appointment as speaker, the position was vacant from 17 October to 20 November. Efforts to unify the MPP parliamentary caucus and the broader party itself came after Uchral's elevation to the chairmanship.

Candidate	Votes	%
Nyam-Osoryn Uchral	1,974	94.95%
Baatarjavyn Lkhavgajav [mn]	105	5.05%
Invalid votes	7	–
Total	2,086	100.0%
Turnout	2,086	100.0%
Source: Ikon

Agricultural minister Jadambyn Enkhbayar was elevated to First Deputy and Minister of Economy and Development, succeeding Uchral on 25 November. Enkhbayar's role as Minister of Food, Agriculture, and Light Industry was replaced by former governor of Dornod Province and MP Myagmarsürengiin Badamsüren on the same day.

During a MPP General Assembly on 27 February 2026, chairman Uchral suggested the idea of renouncing the memberships of four MPP politicians, including Amarbayasgalan, who is under investigation for alleged corruption, and Bulgantuya, who violated the constitution according to the Constitutional Court.

== Aftermath ==
=== Political deadlock ===
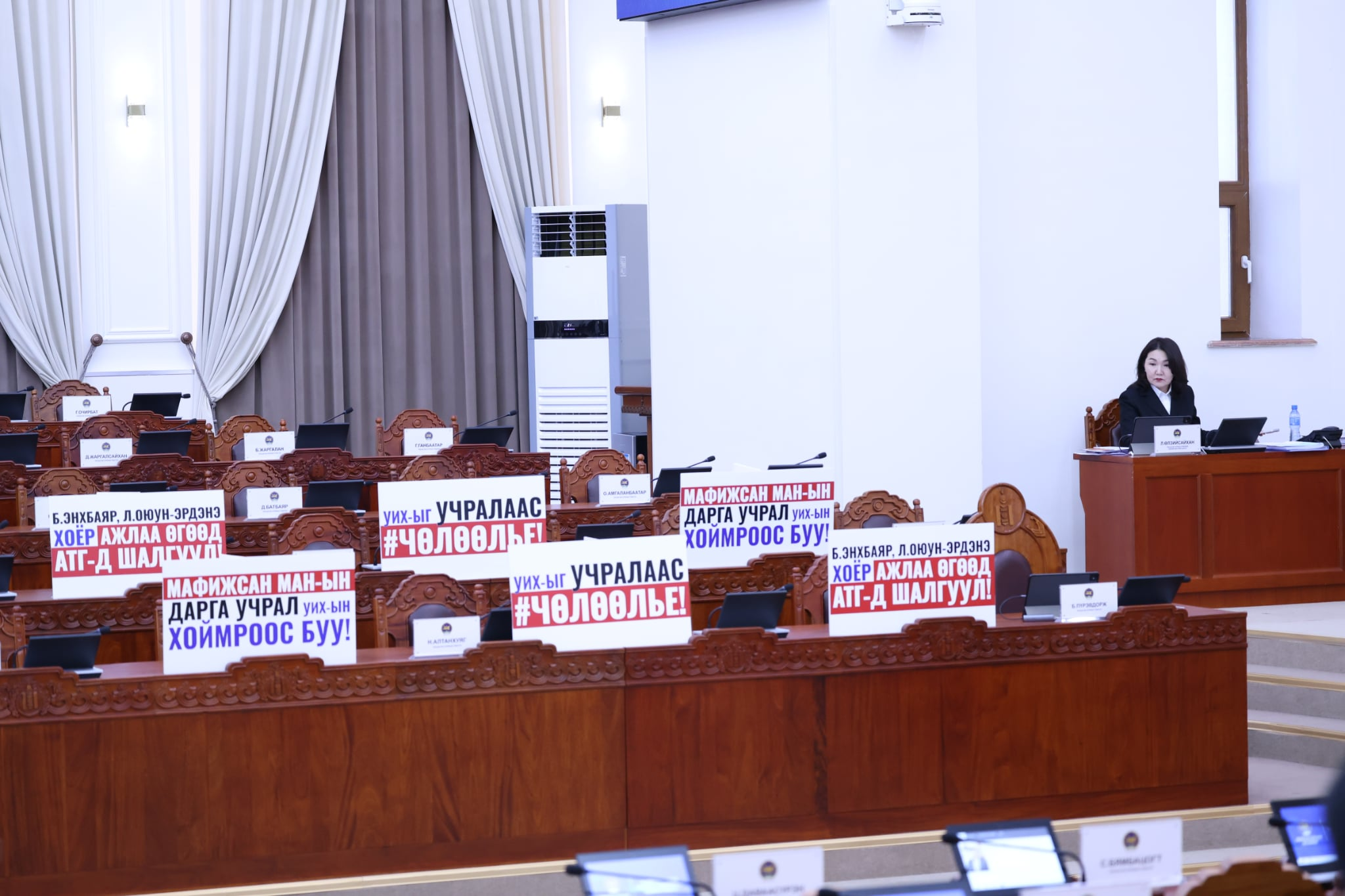
Boycott by the parliamentary opposition Democratic Party on 26 March 2026

The cabinet reshuffle by Zandanshatar, the nomination of MPP chairman Uchral to the speaker of parliament, and seventeen new appointments of deputy ministers in late 2025 were met with harsh criticism from the main opposition, the Democratic Party (DP). The leader of the opposition and the Chairman of the Democratic Party, Odongiin Tsogtgerel, who was elected in August 2025, threatened to boycott all parliamentary procedures and motions, citing the concentration of power by the MPP. The appointment of MPP leader Uchral as speaker drew particular opposition from the DP.

After the convention of the State Great Khural spring session on 18 March 2026, Tsogtgerel stated, "It is inappropriate for the chairman of a multi-party parliament to simultaneously hold the role of party chair," and announced a parliamentary boycott by the DP amid growing economic uncertainties triggered by the 2026 Strait of Hormuz crisis. Despite the MPP having enough seats to fulfill the 64-seat requirement to convene the parliament, the absence of several MPP lawmakers allied to Oyun-Erdene led to a political deadlock. On 26 March, the DP caucus threatened to dismiss Uchral if he didn't resign as speaker.

=== Resignation of Gombojavyn Zandanshatar ===
Consequently, to prevent the gridlock, Prime Minister Zandanshatar submitted his resignation to the Executive Council of the MPP, the highest decision-making body of the party, on 27 March 2026. The party board members unanimously accepted his resignation, causing a motion to be discussed by the State Great Khural the following day. Prior to the parliamentary session, opposition leader Tsogtgerel declared that all 42 DP lawmakers would boycott the session if the procedure was chaired by MPP chairman Uchral.

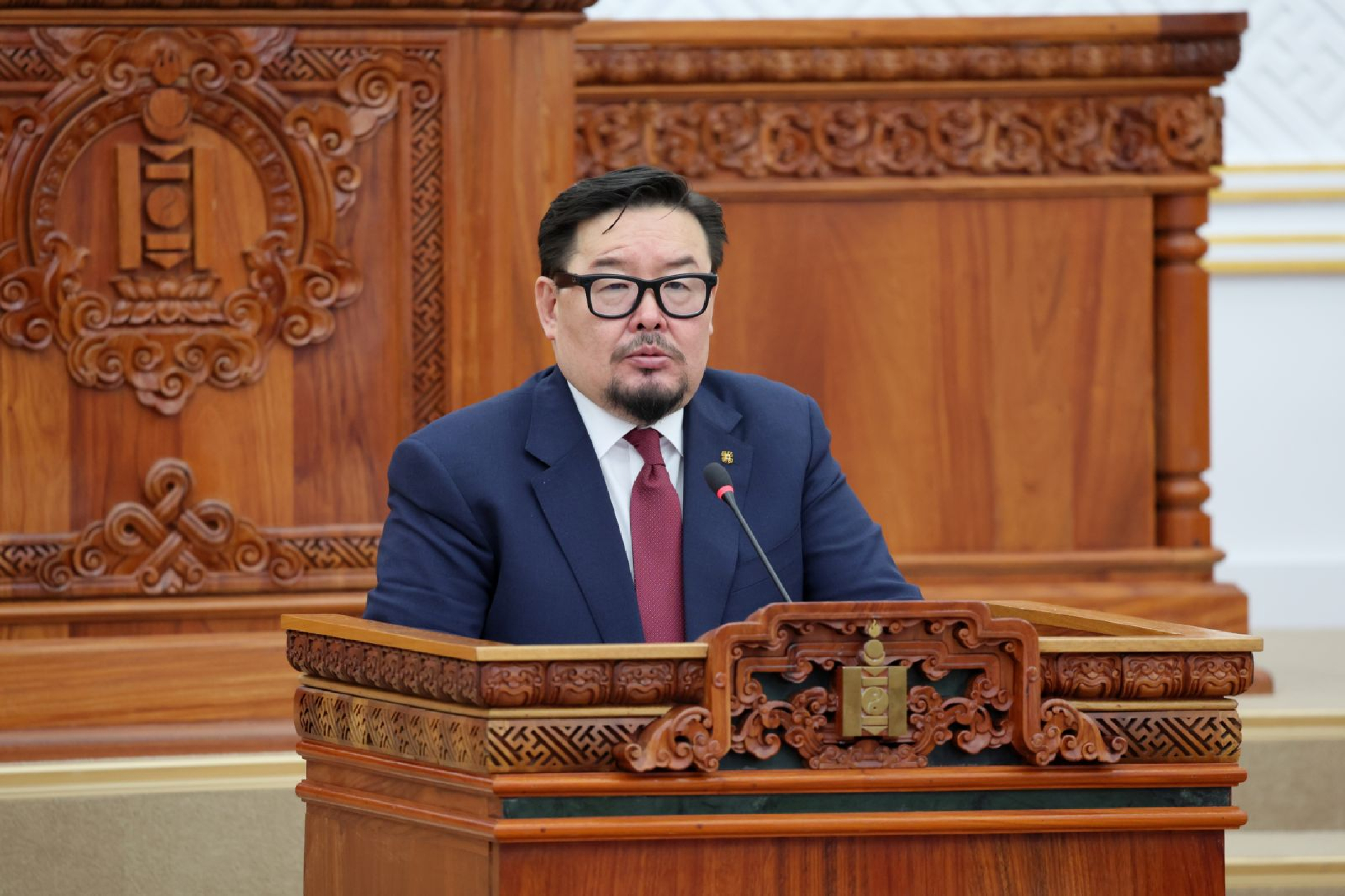
Prime Minister Zandanshatar, during an address to parliament, after his resignation was approved by the State Great Khural on 27 March 2026.

The motion to accept Zandanshatar's resignation was chaired by Uchral, promptly leading to a DP boycott and a turnout of only 73 MPs out of 126. Zandanshatar, in his speech to parliament, stated that he was resigning from his post to prevent the deadlock amid internal and external turmoil. His resignation was accepted (54-19) by parliament on the evening of 27 March 2026. Thereby, a new prime minister was to be chosen by the State Great Khural and the President within 30 days.

Motion to accept the prime minister's resignation
Ballot →	27 March 2026
Required majority →	36 out of 73 ✓ 18
Votes in favour	54 / 126
Votes against	19 / 126
Absentees	53 / 126
Source: Ikon

=== Uchral government ===
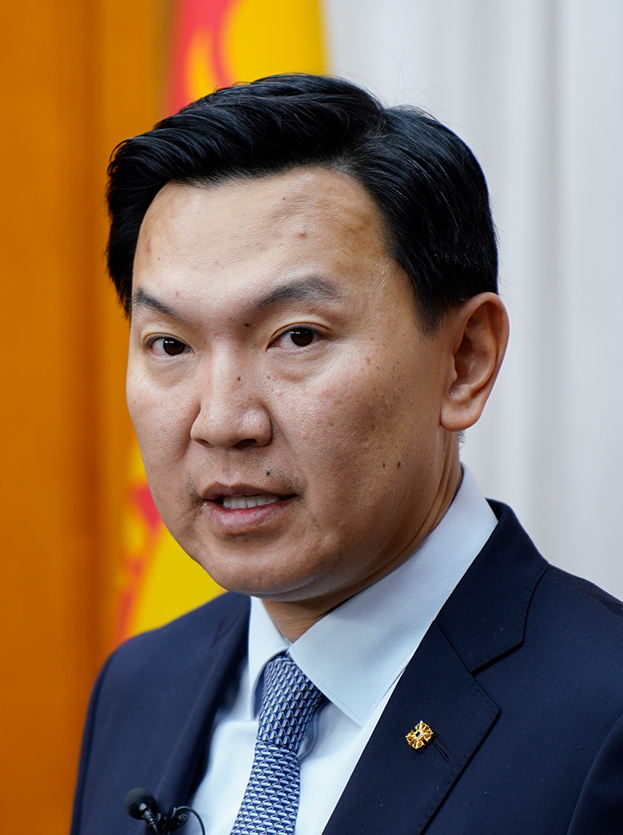
35th Prime Minister Nyam-Osoryn Uchral, 2025

Following the resignation of Zandanshatar, the highest decision-making body of the ruling MPP nominated 99.7% in favor of party chairman and speaker of parliament Nyam-Osoryn Uchral on 29 March 2026. The next day, his nomination was approved (23-1) by the parliamentary Standing Committee on State Structure. Subsequently, he was dismissed as speaker and, the following night, appointed prime minister by the State Great Khural with 88 of the 107 in favor. He became Mongolia's third prime minister since the 2024 elections. At the beginning of 31 March, he received his seal from Zandanshatar.

The second-largest parliamentary bloc, the DP, announced it had no intentions of joining the new cabinet led by Uchral. Without the DP's 42 seats, the MPP invited its previous partner, the HUN Party, to the coalition government on 31 March 2026. Uchral unveiled his cabinet, comprising the MPP, the HUN, and the National Coalition, to the State Great Khural for approval on 3 April 2026, the same day the next speaker, Sandagiin Byambatsogt, was appointed. Uchral's coalition government was sworn later on 4 April.

== See also ==
- 2025 Mongolian protests
- 2022 Mongolian protests
- Mongolian People's Party
- Politics of Mongolia
