= Bökhchuluuny Pürevdorj =

Mongolian politician

- Бөхчулууны Пүрэвдорж
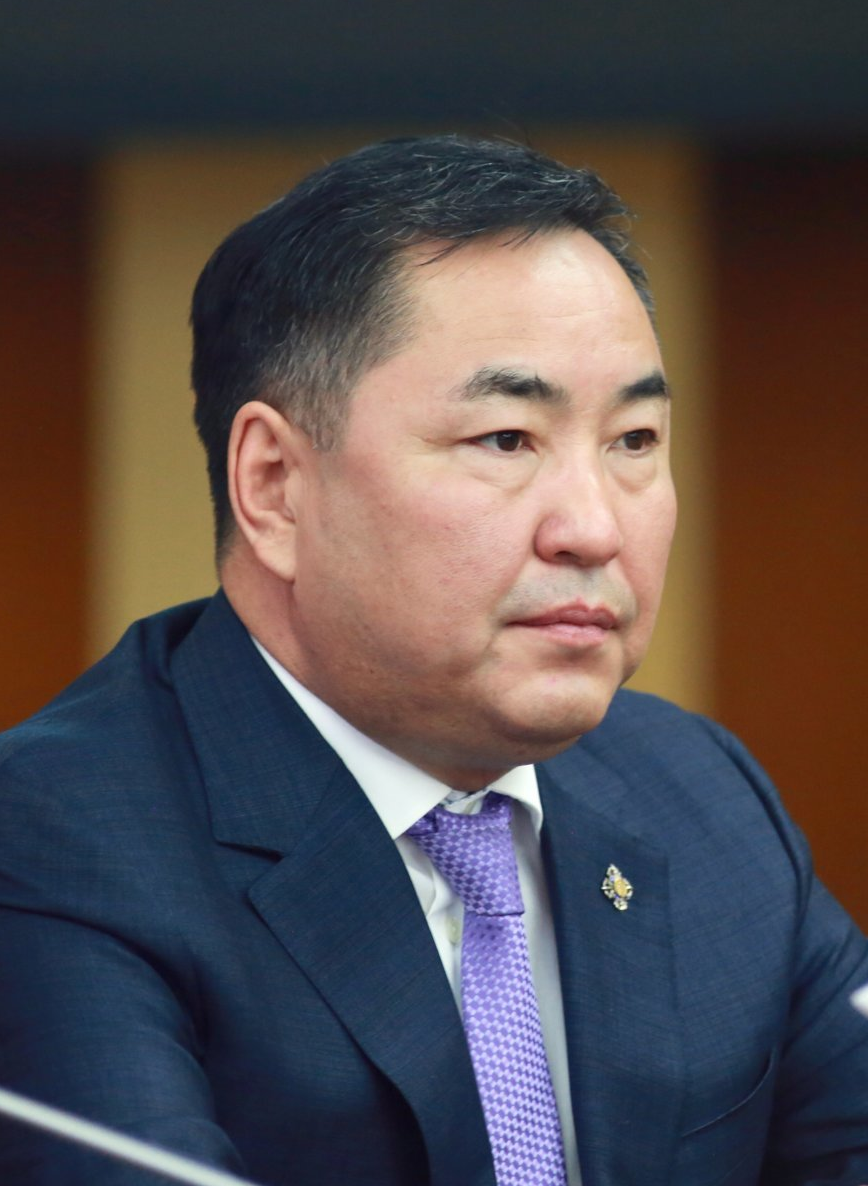
- Pürevdorj in 2023

Deputy Chairman of the State Great Khural
- Incumbent
- Assumed office 2 July 2024 Serving with Jadambyn Bat-Erdene
- Appointed by: State Great Khural
- Chairman: Dashzegviin Amarbayasgalan; Nyam-Osoryn Uchral

Member of the State Great Khural
- Incumbent
- Assumed office 5 July 2016
- Constituency: 2nd, Gobi-Altai, Zavkhan, Khovd, Uvs Province (2024–present); 16th, Khovd Province (2020–2024); 34th, Khovd Province (2016–2020)

Personal details
- Born: 10 May 1973 (age 53) Zereg, Khovd, Mongolia
- Party: Democratic Party
- Education: National University of Mongolia
- Awards: Order of the Polar Star

Bökhchuluuny Pürevdorj (Mongolian: Бөхчулууны Пүрэвдорж; born 10 May 1973) is a Mongolian politician who currently serves as deputy chairperson of the State Great Khural, the unicameral legislature of Mongolia, since July 2024. A member of the Democratic Party, he was thrice elected as member of parliament to the State Great Khural in 2016, 2020 and recently 2024.

== Early life and education ==
He was born in Zereg, Khovd Province on 10 May 1973. Pürevdorj studied at the National University of Mongolia from 1990 and graduated with a bachelor's degree in 1994. He graduated again from NUM from 2019 to 2024.

== Political career ==
A member of the Democratic Party (DP), he served as the chairman of the Democratic Party of Khovd Province from 2009 to 2012. In the 2016 parliamentary election, he ran as the Democratic candidate for the 34th Khovd constituency and was elected to the State Great Khural. He was re-elected as MP from the 16th Khovd constituency in the 2020 election.

=== Deputy chairman of the State Great Khural ===
In the 2024 election, he secured his third consecutive term from the 2nd Gobi-Altai, Zavkhan, Khovd, and Uvs Province constituency. On 2 July 2024, during the opening of the 9th State Great Khural, Pürevdorj was nominated as the deputy chairman of the State Great Khural, alongside Khürelbaataryn Bulgantuya from the Mongolian People's Party (MPP).

In late August, the 380 delegates of the National Policy Committee, the presidium of the DP, met to elect a new party chairman. Pürevdorj, along with three other politicians, declared their candidacy for the party chairmanship on August 29. He received 82 out of 314 votes, and lost to Odongiin Tsogtgerel, who had won 196 votes.

On 17 October 2025, speaker Dashzegviin Amarbayasgalan was dismissed by the State Great Khural due to an internal crisis within the MPP. Subsequently, Pürevdorj was named acting parliamentary speaker until a successor was chosen by the State Great Khural. The same day, Gombojavyn Zandanshatar was ousted as prime minister after a parliamentary vote chaired by Bulgantuya. Later, the motion dismissing Zandanshatar was declared unconstitutional by the Constitutional Court on October 23, and Bulgantuya herself was called by opposition lawmakers to resign.

During his tenure as acting chairperson, a political feud was unfolding within the ruling MPP between factions led by prime minister Zandanshatar and speaker Amarbayasgalan. He oversaw the drafting and passing of the 2026 budget bill. On 12 November 2025, Jadambyn Bat-Erdene was nominated and inaugurated as a successor to Bulgantuya, subsequently becoming the next acting chairperson of the State Great Khural.
