= Investment and Trade Agency of Mongolia =

Government agency of Mongolia

- Хөрөнгө Oруулалт, Xудалдааны Газар
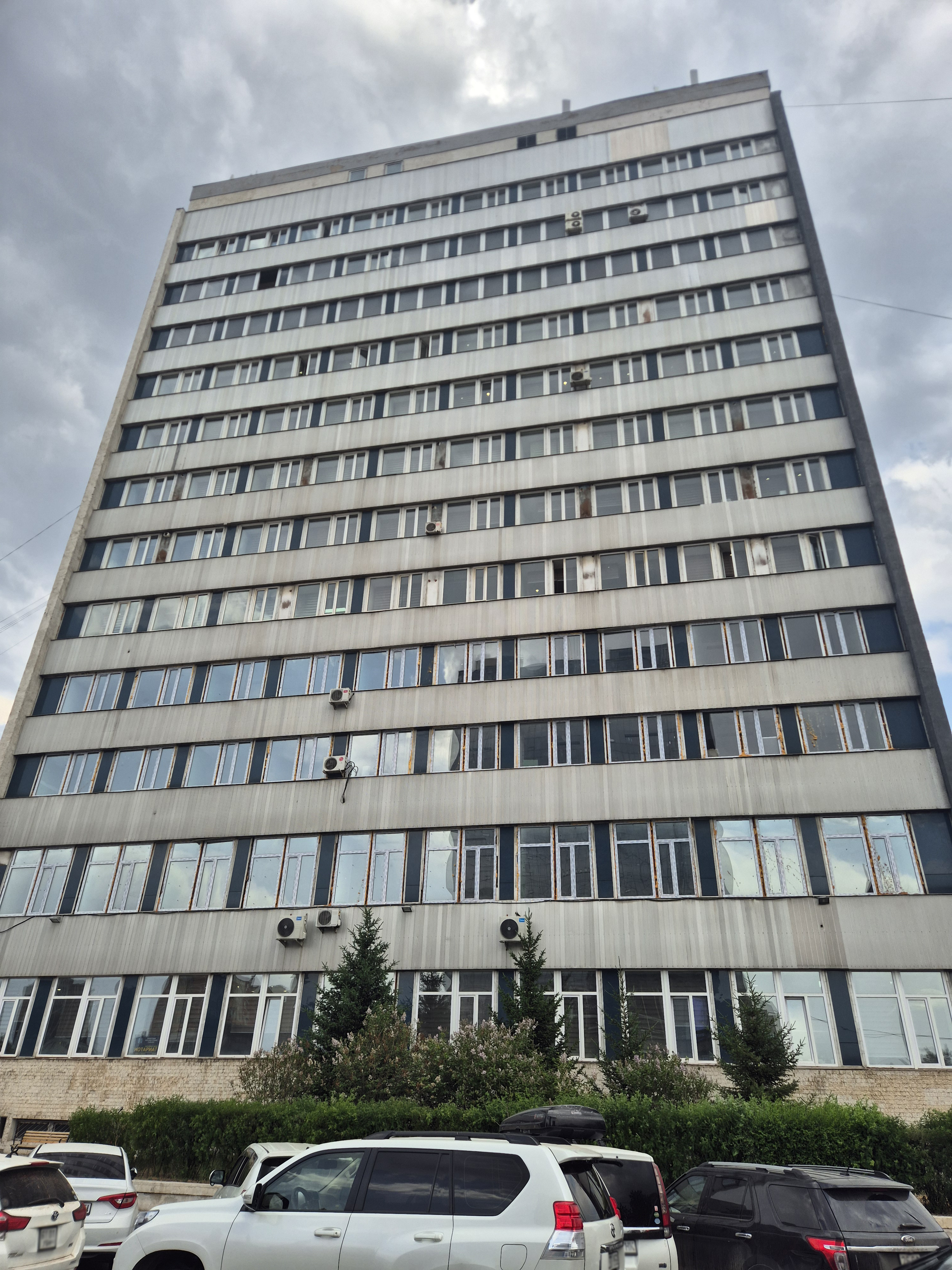

Agency overview
- Formed: 1998
- Headquarters: Chingeltei, Ulaanbaatar, Mongolia; 47°55′21.3″N 106°54′24.7″E
- Parent Ministry: Ministry of Economy and Development
- Website: Official website

The Investment and Trade Agency of Mongolia (ITA; Mongolian: Хөрөнгө Oруулалт, Xудалдааны Газар) is a government agency of Mongolia on investment and trade promotion of the country.

== History ==
The agency was originally established in 1998. In early 2023, the Government of Mongolia decided to relaunch the investment agency. In late 2023, the agency was reinstated. It was then joined the World Association of Investment Promotion Agencies.

== Organizational structures ==
ITA is the agency under the Ministry of Economy and Development.

== See also ==
- Ministry of Finance (Mongolia)
