= Ministry of Economy and Development (Mongolia) =

Ministry of Mongolia, manages national development and economy-related affairs

Ministry of Economy and Development of Mongolia
- Монгол Улсын; Эдийн засаг, хөгжлийн яам

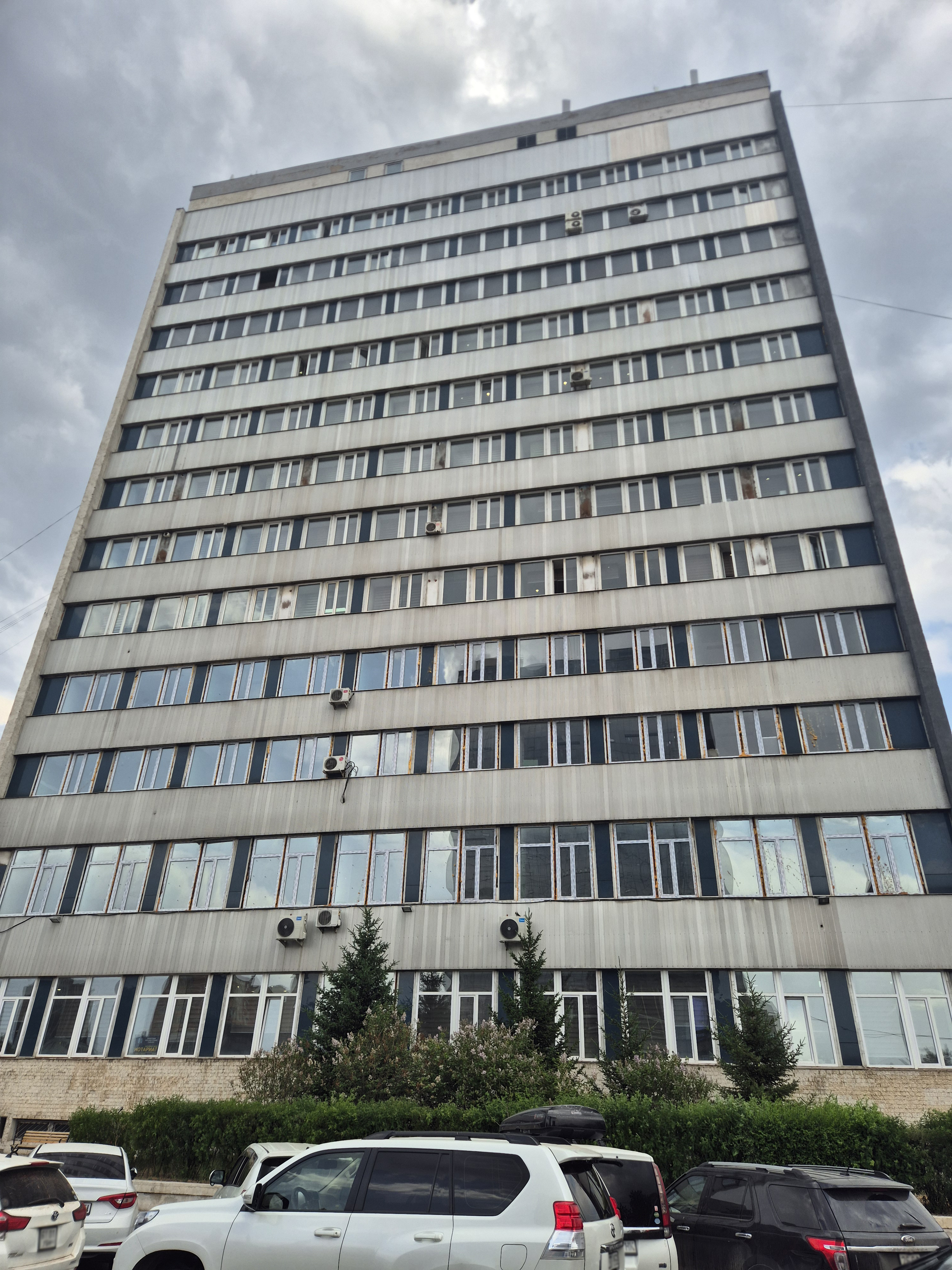

Agency overview
- Formed: 2022
- Preceding agency: National Development Agency (2016-2022)
- Jurisdiction: Government of Mongolia
- Headquarters: Government Building XI, J.Sambuu St, Chingeltei, Ulaanbaatar 15141, Mongolia
- Employees: 135
- Minister responsible: Chimediin Khürelbaatar, Deputy Prime Minister and Minister of Economy and Development
- Deputy Minister responsible: Gantömöriin Tüvdendorj, Vice Minister
- Child agency: Investment and Trade Agency of Mongolia
- Website: med.gov.mn

The Ministry of Economy and Development (Mongolian: Монгол Улсын Эдийн засаг, хөгжлийн яам) is a ministry of the Government of Mongolia. It was established in 2022 on the basis of the National Development Agency. Ministry has jurisdiction over a broad policy area, including national mid and long-term development policy planning, manage and coordinate the implementation of the integrated policy of development. Ministry is headed by the Deputy Prime Minister of Mongolia and Minister of Economy and Development. The Investment and Trade Agency of Mongolia operates under the jurisdiction of the minister.

== Structure ==
The Ministry is organised into following departments and divisions:

- Department of Macroeconomic Policy
  - Division of Research and Analysis
  - Division of Policy and Perspective
  - Division of Competitiveness Research
- Department of Integrated Policy and Planning
  - Division of Integrated Policy on Sectors
  - Division of Social Development
- Department of Regional and Local Development
- Department of Investment Policy
  - Division of Industrialization and Infrastructure
  - Division of Public-Private Partnership
- Department of Trade and Economic Cooperation Policy
  - Division of Trade
  - Division of Free Zone
- Department of Innovation Policy
- Department of Public Administration
  - Division of Finance
  - Division of Law
- Department of Monitoring, Evaluation and Internal Audit
