= Chairman of the Democratic Party (Mongolia) =

Head of the Democratic Party (Mongolia)

- Ардчилсан Намын дарга
- Emblem of the Democratic Party

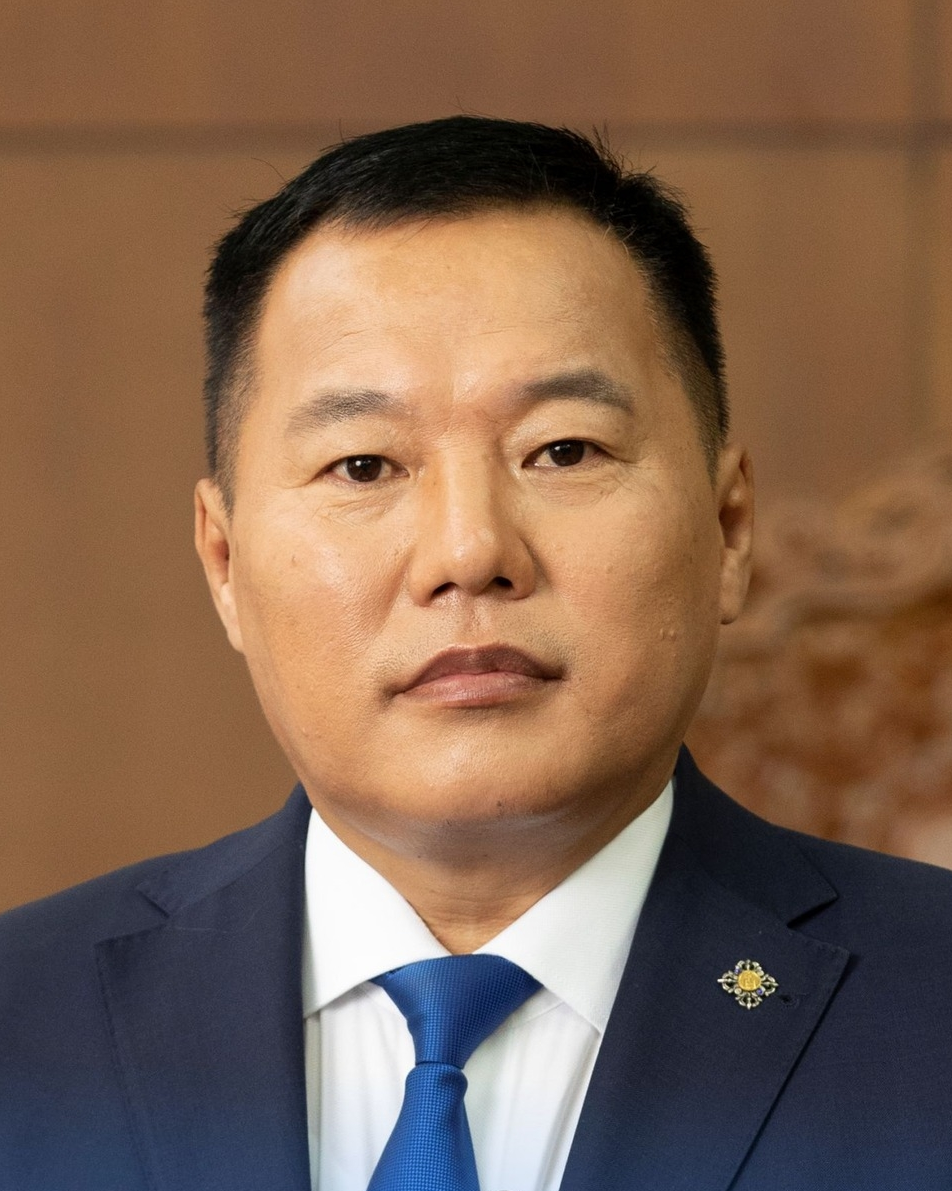
- Incumbent; Odongiin Tsogtgerel since 18 September 2025
- Status: Head of party
- Seat: Ulaanbaatar
- Appointer: Direct party member vote
- Term length: No term limit and renewal
- Formation: 6 December 2000
- First holder: Erdeniin Bat-Üül (MDP); Dambiin Dorligjav (DP)
- Website: democraticparty.mn

The Chairman of the Democratic Party (Mongolian: Ардчилсан Намын дарга) is the leader of the Democratic Party, established on 6 December 2000 when five opposition parties merged. The party traces its historic roots back to the 1990 Democratic Revolution, when the Mongolian Democratic Party was founded by the Mongolian Democratic Union.

The chairperson of the DP is elected by a direct majority vote by the party presidium, the National Policy Committee (NPC). The current chairperson is Odongiin Tsogtgerel, who was elected to the position in 2025.

Between late 2020 and 2023, the party's leadership was disputed between various factions. Officially, however, Sodnomzunduin Erdene remained as the registered party chairman by the Supreme Court until 2023, when he was succeeded by Luvsannyamyn Gantömör, who was elected by the NPC with 152 votes.

== List ==
No.	Portrait	Name	Term of office		Notes
No.	Portrait	Name	Took office	Left office	Notes
Mongolian Democratic Party (1990–1992)
1		Erdeniin Bat-Üül	18 February 1990	1991	First chairman of the MDP.
2		Mendsaikhany Enkhsaikhan	1991	25 October 1992 (Note: Merged with the Mongolian National Progress Party and the Mongolian United Party.)	Second chairman of the MDP.
Mongolian National Democratic Party (1992–2000)
1		Davaadorjiin Ganbold	25 October 1992	5 April 1996	Previously, the founder and chairman of the Mongolian National Progress Party.
2		Tsakhiagiin Elbegdorj	5 April 1996	December 1998	Resigned after losing a motion of confidence as prime minister in April 1998.
3		Janlavyn Narantsatsralt	December 1998	July 1999	Resigned after losing a motion of confidence as prime minister in July 1999.
4		Rinchinnyamyn Amarjargal	July 1999	6 December 2000 (Note: Merged with the Mongolian Social Democratic Party, the Mongolian Democratic Party, the Mongolian Democratic Renaissance Party, and the Mongolian Religious Democratic Party.)	Unseated in the 2000 parliamentary election, resigned after the 2000 defeat.
Democratic Party of Mongolia (since 2000)
1		Dambiin Dorligjav	6 December 2000	2002	
2		Mendsaikhany Enkhsaikhan	2002	2005	Lost the 2005 Mongolian presidential election, coming in second.
3		Radnaasümbereliin Gonchigdorj	2005	October 2006	
4		Tsakhiagiin Elbegdorj	October 2006	2 September 2008	
5		Norovyn Altankhuyag	2 September 2008	14 November 2014	Resigned as prime minister and party chairman after losing a no confidence vote.
6		Zandaakhüügiin Enkhbold	14 November 2014	12 February 2017	Unseated in the 2016 parliamentary election, resigned after the 2016 defeat.
7		Sodnomzunduin Erdene	12 February 2017	19 January 2023	Elected by the NPC on 30 January 2017. Unseated in the 2020 parliamentary election.
8		Luvsannyamyn Gantömör	19 January 2023	18 September 2025	
9		Odongiin Tsogtgerel	18 September 2025	Incumbent	
