= Odongiin Tsogtgerel =

Mongolian politician

- Одонгийн Цогтгэрэл
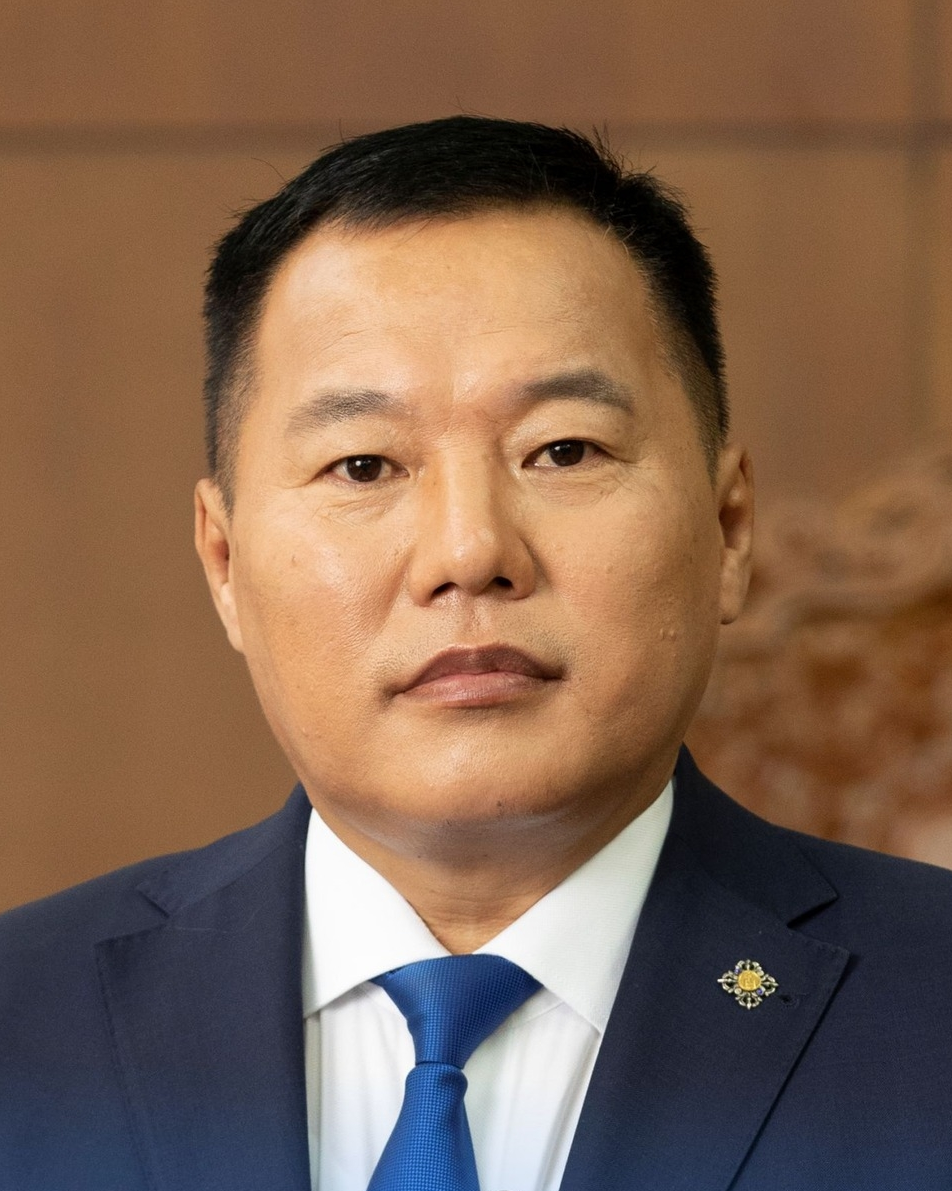
- Tsogtgerel in 2024

Chairman of the Democratic Party
- Incumbent
- Assumed office 18 September 2025
- Preceded by: Luvsannyamyn Gantömör

Member of the State Great Khural
- Incumbent
- Assumed office 30 June 2020
- Constituency: 2nd, Gobi-Altai, Zavkhan, Khovd, Uvs Province (2024–Present); 15th, Uvs Province (2020–2024)

Personal details
- Born: 31 December 1976 (age 49) Tes, Uvs Province, Mongolia
- Party: Democratic Party
- Education: School of Computer Technology and Management (BEc); National Academy of Governance (Ph.D.)
- Awards: Order of the Polar Star

Odongiin Tsogtgerel (Mongolian: Одонгийн Цогтгэрэл; born 31 December 1976) is a Mongolian politician, economist, and leader of the Democratic Party from 2025. He was elected twice to the State Great Khural, and is currently serving as MP since 2020. He has been the leader of the Democratic Party caucus since 2022.

== Early life and education ==
On 31 December 1976, Tsogtgerel was born in Tes Sum, Uvs Province. He completed secondary school of Tes Sum in 1994. He obtained a bachelor’s degree in Economics from the School of Computer Technology and Management at the Mongolian University of Science and Technology in 1998, and earned a Ph.D. from the National Academy of Governance in 2008.

== Career ==
From 1998 to 2011, Tsogtgerel was the Director of TESO LLC, a major Mongolian food manufacturing corporation. He later served as its President between 2015 and 2020. He worked as an adviser to prime minister Norovyn Altankhuyag and Chimediin Saikhanbileg between 2012 and 2015, and held the position of Chairman of the Democratic Party in Uvs Province from 2015 to 2017.

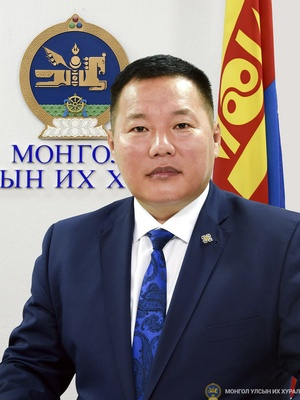
Official portrait, 2020

In the 2020 parliamentary election, he was elected as member of the State Great Khural in the 15th, Uvs Province constituency. Since 2022, Tsogtgerel has been the leader of the Democratic Party caucus in the State Great Khural. During the 2024 parliamentary election, he was re-elected as MP from the 2nd, Govi-Altai Province, Zavkhan Province, Khovd Province, Uvs Province constituency.

On 31 August 2025, Tsogtgerel was elected Chairman of the Democratic Party by the party’s National Policy Committee. In the first round of voting, he received 196 out of 314 votes, defeating fellow candidates Bökhchuluuny Pürevdorj, Judagiin Bayarmaa, and Barkhuugiin Otgonbat, who obtained 82, 33, and 3 votes respectively. He was officially registered as the next party chairman by the Supreme Court of Mongolia on September 18, succeeding previous leader Luvsannyamyn Gantömör.

== Party chairmanship ==
Following the 2023 amendments to Mongolia’s Law on Political Parties, all political parties were required to submit their revised charters, leadership structures and internal governance documents to the Supreme Court by December 31, 2025. As part of this nationwide compliance effort, the Democratic Party of Mongolia submitted its materials affirming the selection of Tsogtgerel as party chairman. On January 12, 2026, the Supreme Court officially registered him as the Chairman of the Democratic Party, thereby legally formalizing his leadership. Tsogtgerel had been elected party chairman in August 2025 by the party's National Policy Committee, securing 196 votes in the first round. His leadership marked a renewed effort to modernize and reform the party after years of internal division and electoral stagnation.

Under Tsogtgerel's leadership, the Democratic party positioned itself as a pragmatic, business-friendly opposition. Moving away from long-standing internal rivalries tied to elder party figures, Tsogtgerel leveraged his background as founder of the TESO conglomerate to unify competing party factions.

== Awards ==
He received the Order of the Polar Star in 2012.
