= Luvsannyamyn Gantömör =

Mongolian politician and former Democratic chairman from 2023 to 2025

- Лувсаннямын Гантөмөр
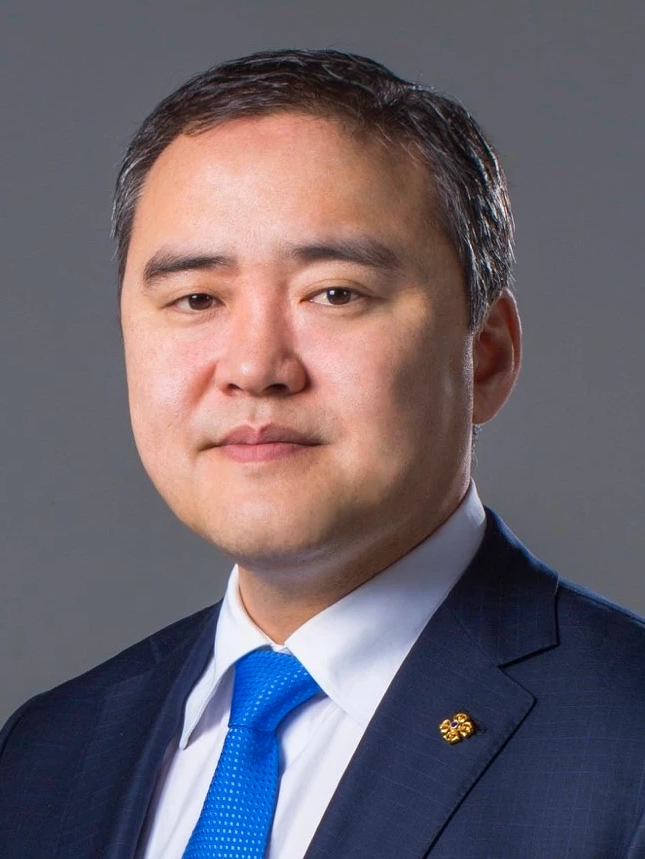
- Gantömör in 2024

Chairman of the Democratic Party
- In office 19 January 2023 – 18 September 2025
- Preceded by: Sodnomzunduin Erdene
- Succeeded by: Odongiin Tsogtgerel

Member of the State Great Khural
- Incumbent
- Assumed office 2 July 2024
- Constituency: Closed list
- In office 6 July 2012 – 5 July 2016
- Constituency: 23rd, Sükhbaatar District, Ulaanbaatar
- In office 28 August 2008 – 6 July 2012
- Constituency: 23rd, Sükhbaatar District, Ulaanbaatar
- In office 26 July 2004 – 28 August 2008
- Constituency: 76th, Sükhbaatar District, Ulaanbaatar

First Deputy Prime Minister of Mongolia and Minister of Economy and Development
- In office 10 July 2024 – 13 June 2025
- President: Ukhnaagiin Khürelsükh
- Prime Minister: Luvsannamsrain Oyun-Erdene
- Preceded by: Chimediin Khürelbaatar as Deputy Prime Minister and Minister of Economy and Development
- Succeeded by: Nyam-Osoryn Uchral

Minister of Education, Culture, and Science
- In office 10 August 2012 – 7 July 2016
- President: Tsakhiagiin Elbegdorj
- Prime Minister: Norovyn Altankhuyag; Chimediin Saikhanbileg
- Preceded by: Yondongiin Otgonbayar
- Succeeded by: Jamiyansürengiin Batsuuri

Personal details
- Born: 26 February 1973 (age 53) Ulaangom, Uvs Province, Mongolia
- Party: Democratic Party
- Education: Sendai Kosen; Nagaoka University of Technology

Luvsannyamyn Gantömör (Mongolian: Лувсаннямын Гантөмөр; born 26 February 1973) is a Mongolian politician and leader of the Democratic Party from 2023 to 2025. He was a member of the State Great Khural from 2004 to 2016, and was re-elected as a member of parliament (MP) in 2024.

He previously served as Minister of Education under the Altankhuyag and Saikhanbileg cabinets from 2012 to 2016, and as deputy leader of the Democratic Party caucus between 2009 and 2012.

== Early life and education ==
Gantömör was born in Ulaangom, Uvs Province, and graduated high school in 1991. Between 1993 and 1996 he studied in Japan at Sendai University's National Institute of Technology, training as a communications engineer, and between 1996 and 1999 at Nagaoka University of Technology as an electronics engineer.

Between 2000 and 2007 he was the deputy leader of the Democratic Youth Union, and served as its leader from 2007 to 2010.

== Political career ==
He served as member of the State Great Khural for three consecutive terms from 2004 to 2016. From 2012 to 2016, Gantömör served as Minister of Education, Culture and Science during the governments of Norovyn Altankhuyag and Chimediin Saikhanbileg.

In the 2016 parliamentary election, the Democratic Party (DP) suffered a heavy defeat to the Mongolian People's Party (MPP), securing only 9 seats compared to the MPP's 65 out 76 seats. Gantömör lost his seat in the 62th constituency in Sukhbaatar District.

=== Party chairmanship ===
In January 2023, he was elected the party's next chairman by the National Policy Committee (the presidium of the DP), winning the vote 152–129–12 against two other candidates.

During his tenure as chairman, the DP won 42 out of 126 seats in the State Great Khural and received 30.14% of the proportional vote in the 2024 parliamentary election. The result marked a significant resurgence for the Democratic Party after nearly a decade of undisputed MPP rule and Democratic political infighting.

Gantömör signed a memorandum of understanding with the MPP chairman and previous prime minister Luvsannamsrain Oyun-Erdene and HUN Party chairman Togmidyn Dorjkhand, effectively forming a coalition government between the 3 major parties. He served as First Deputy Prime Minister of Mongolia from 2024 until the May 2025 protests, when Oyun-Erdene was ousted in a motion of no confidence and the DP expelled from the coalition government.

Subsequently, after the fall of the coalition government, Gantömör stated that he would "handover his position and has no mindset or interest in staying as party leader" after he "spent 2 years grappling to unite the party."

In August 2025 during the special session of the National Policy Committee, Gantömör officially submitted his resignation request while elections for the next party chairman was still ongoing. On September 18, he was officially succeeded by the chairman-elect Odongiin Tsogtgerel.
