= Democratic Party (Mongolia) =

Political party in Mongolia

Democratic Party Ардчилсан Нам
- Abbreviation: DP (English); АН (Mongolian)
- Chairperson: Odongiin Tsogtgerel
- Secretary-General: Sangajavyn Bayartsogt
- Governing body: National Policy Committee
- Founded: 6 December 2000
- Merger of: See list: Mongolian Democratic Party; Mongolian National Democratic Party; Mongolian Social Democratic Party; Mongolian Democratic Renaissance Party; Mongolian Religious Democratic Party
- Headquarters: Ulaanbaatar
- Newspaper: Daily News (Өдрийн сонин)
- Student wing: Democratic Student's Union
- Youth wing: Democratic Youth Union
- Women's wing: Democratic Women's Union
- Membership (2024): ▲172,000
- Ideology: Liberal conservatism; Liberalism; Economic liberalism; Mongolian nationalism
- Political position: Centre-right
- International affiliation: International Democracy Union
- Colors: Blue
- State Great Khural: 42 / 126
- Provincial Governors: 8 / 21
- Ulaanbaatar District Governors: 1 / 9

Party flag

Website
- democraticparty.mn

The Democratic Party (DP) (Mongolian: Ардчилсан Нам, romanized: Ardchilsan Nam (Note: In English, the party can be called both the Democratic Party and the Democratic Party of Mongolia. The official name of the party in Mongolian is Democratic Party)) is a centre-right political party in Mongolia. It was founded through the merger of five opposition political parties that advocated for democratic and economic reforms during the country's post-communist transition. The DP is currently one of the two main dominant political parties in Mongolian politics.

Founded on 6 December 2000, the DP is Mongolia's second-oldest politically active party, the oldest being the Mongolian People's Party (MPP), an ex-communist party that ruled the Mongolian People's Republic from 1921 to 1990 as a one-party state. The DP traces its historic roots back to the 1990 Democratic Revolution, when young intellectuals and foreign-taught students began demonstrating against the state in favour of free and fair elections and a market economy. The establishment of the Mongolian Democratic Union in late 1989 laid the groundwork for Mongolia's main opposition force and the DP's earliest predecessor, the Mongolian Democratic Party, on 18 February 1990.

== History ==
=== Founding and early years ===
After the 1990 Democratic Revolution, Mongolia transitioned to a multi-party parliamentary republic with a limited president. The leading three pro-democracy organizations founded their own political parties, the Mongolian Democratic Party (MDP), the Mongolian National Progress Party (MNPP), and the Mongolian Social Democratic Party (MSDP) for the country's first democratic elections in July 1990. The opposition parties won around 8% of the seats in the upper house, the People's Great Khural, and 38% in the new lower house, the State Little Khural. The MDP and the MNPP were invited to a unity government by the ex-communist and ruling Mongolian People's Revolutionary Party (MPRP) in September 1990.

The primary opposition formed the Democratic Alliance, a coalition of the MDP, the MNPP, and the Mongolian United Party (led by Sanjaasürengiin Zorig), for the new unicameral legislature, the State Great Khural, in the 1992 parliamentary election. The alliance won 4 of the 76 seats, while the MSDP won a single seat. After the election, the MDP, the MNPP, the MUP, and the Mongolian Renaissance Party united to found the Mongolian National Democratic Party (MNDP) in October 1992. The next year, in June 1993, the MNDP and the MSDP jointly nominated incumbent Punsalmaagiin Ochirbat for the 1993 presidential election, in which he won with 59% of the ballot.

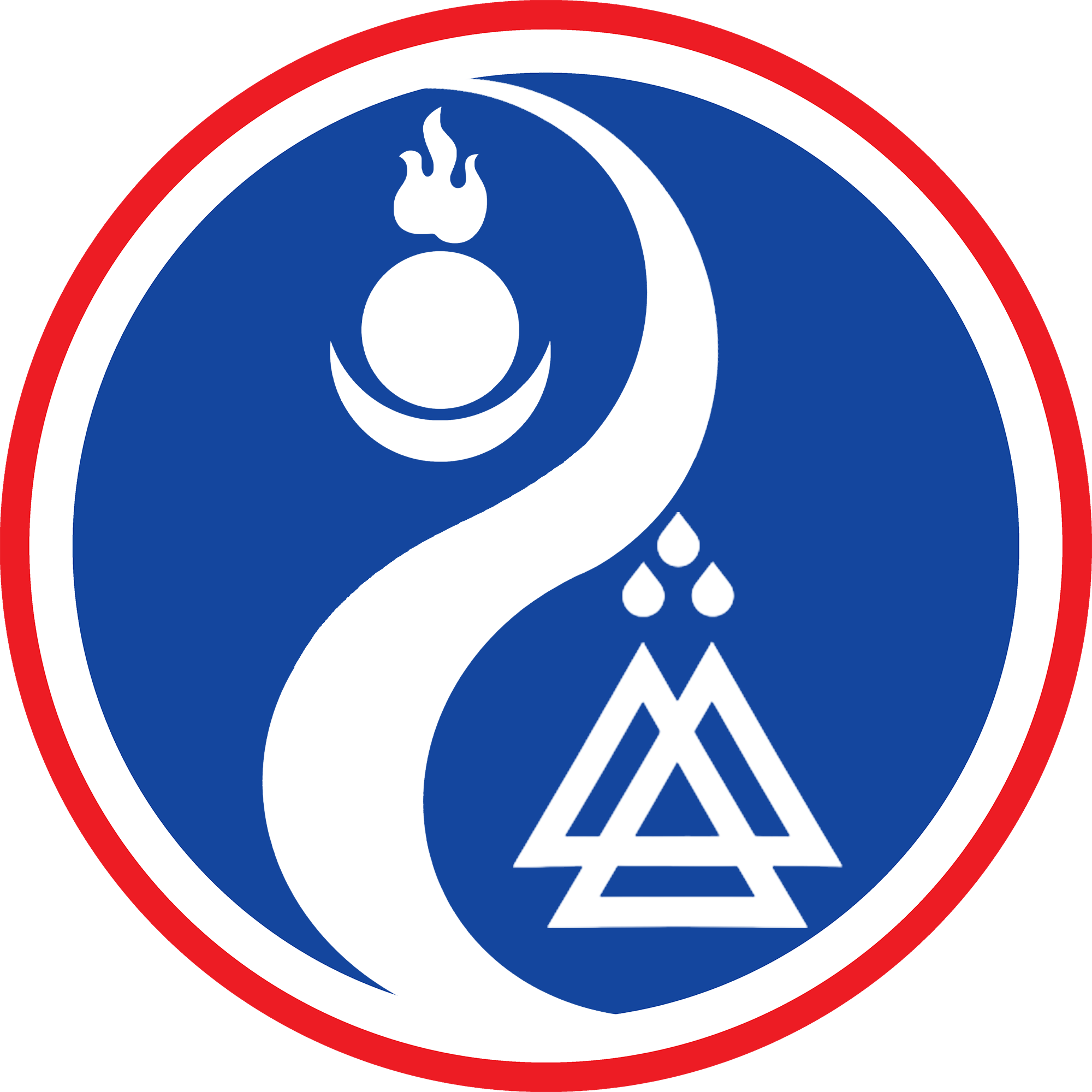
The election symbol of the Democratic Union Coalition, which won 50 seats in 1996

The Democratic Union Coalition (DUC), between the MNDP and the MSDP, saw its first major victory in the 1996 election, where the dominant MPRP was out of power for the first time since 1921. Despite the electoral success, the democratic government would oversee four years of rampant party infighting, unstable governance, and economic slowdown. Between 1996 and 2000, there were a total of four different governments led by the DUC.

For the upcoming elections, the MSDP, the Mongolian Green Party, and the Mongolian Democratic Renaissance Party exited the DUC. The remaining major coalition member, the MNDP, experienced a split in early 2000, when several high-ranking party officials left and re-established the Mongolian Democratic Party. Furthermore, the sudden murder of Sanjaasürengiin Zorig, a key leader during the 1990 revolution, in October 1998 led to the breakaway of party factions and the formation of the Civil Will Party from the reformed MDP in March 2000. The Democratic Union Coalition and its former allies faced an electoral wipeout in the 2000 parliamentary election, winning only a single seat in the State Great Khural. In contrast, the MPRP won a supermajority of 72 seats.

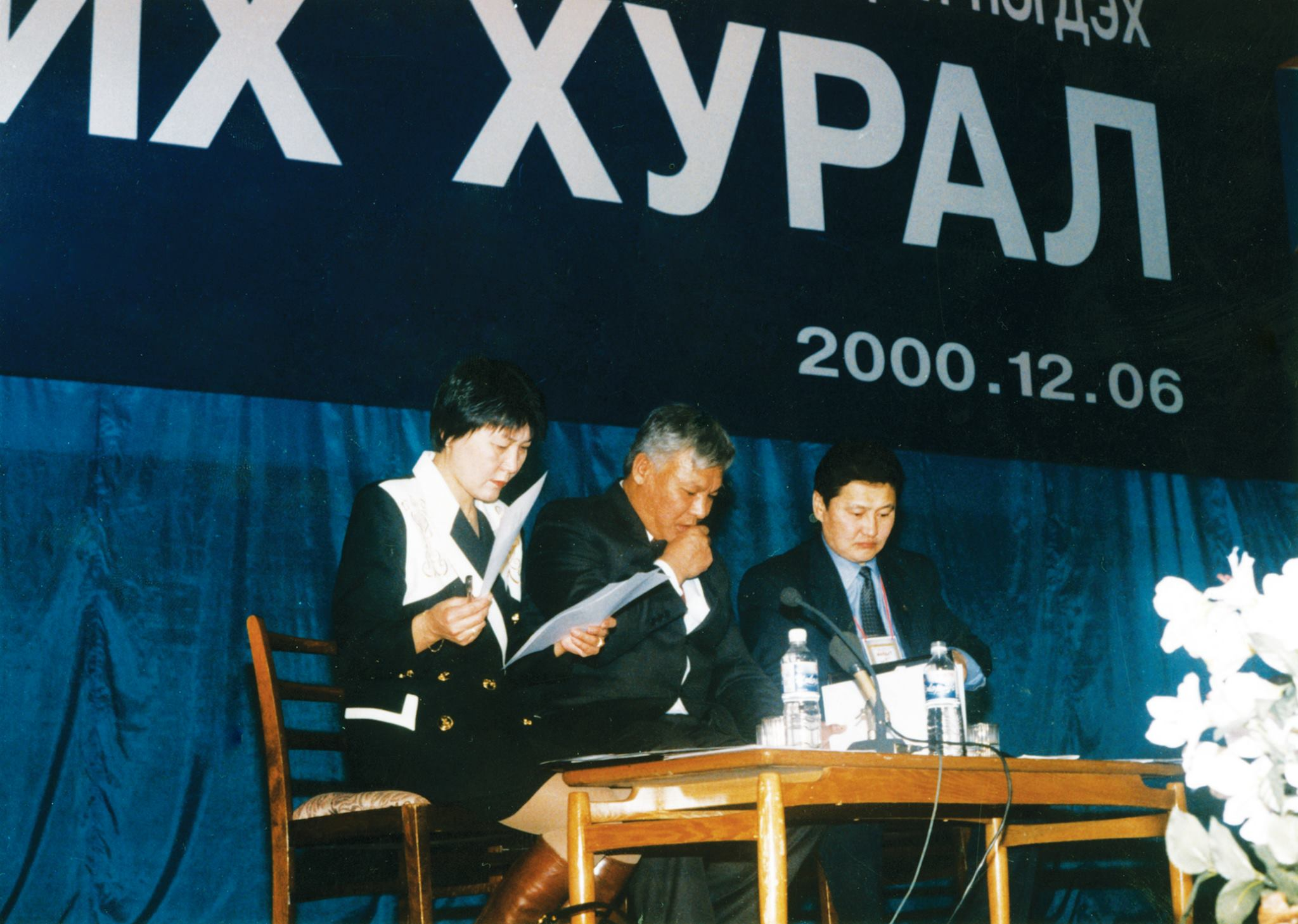
Congress for the merger of the five opposition parties on 6 December 2000

In the aftermath of the electoral defeat, five opposition political parties – the Mongolian National Democratic Party, the Mongolian Social Democratic Party, the Mongolian Democratic Party, the Mongolian Democratic Renaissance Party, and the Mongolian Religious Democratic Party – merged and established the Democratic Party of Mongolia on 6 December 2000, a date which commemorated the year 1206, when Genghis Khan founded the Mongol Empire. Dambiin Dorligjav was elected the party's first chairman during the congress.

=== 2000–2008 ===
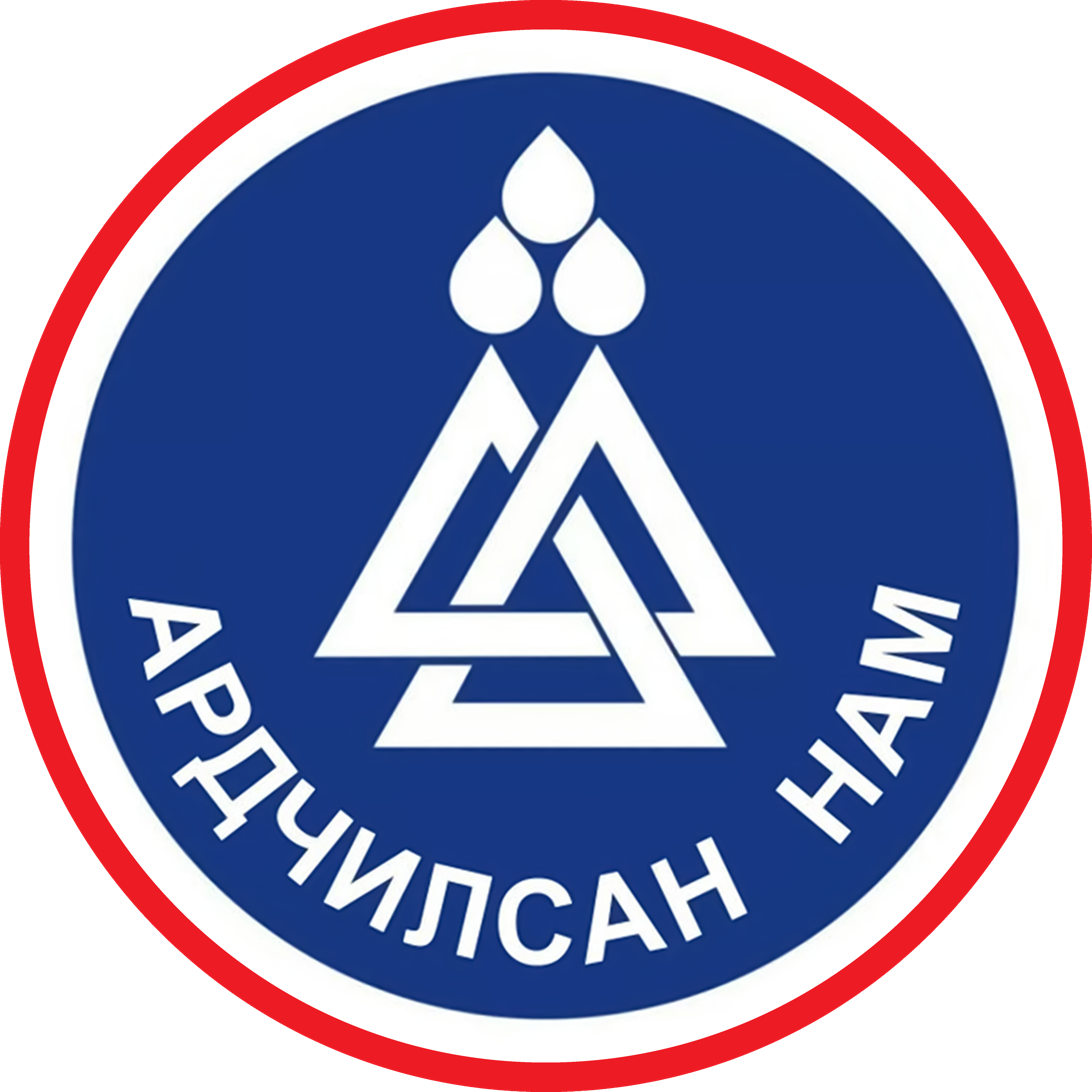
Logo of the Democratic Party (2000–2012)

Lamjavyn Gündalai, the only independent legislator, joined the Democratic Party shortly after its founding. The Democratic Party (DP), with two parliamentary seats, entered an alliance with the Motherland–Mongolian Democratic New Socialist Party (M–MNDSP), which had a single seat, in May 2003. Later in June, the Civil Will–Republican Party, with a single seat, allied with the DP and the M–MNDSP. The three parties officially founded the Motherland Democratic Coalition (MDC) on 16 July 2003. The MDC won 34 seats in the 2004 parliamentary election, while the MPRP won 36 seats. Neither party had the required majority to govern, leading the two sides to negotiate. In August 2004, Tsakhiagiin Elbegdorj was appointed prime minister of a coalition government between the two parties. The MDC was dissolved in late 2004 due to party infighting on various issues, primarily the upcoming 2005 presidential election.

In the 2005 presidential election, party chairman Mendsaikhany Enkhsaikhan was nominated as the DP's presidential candidate. He came in second with around 20% of the vote and lost to MPRP candidate Nambaryn Enkhbayar. After the election, Enkhsaikhan was soon succeeded by Radnaasümbereliin Gonchigdorj as party chairman in 2005. The political fallout from the presidential election led to the creation of the New National Party (led by Enkhsaikhan), the Mongolian Social Democratic Party, and the People's Party by several DP lawmakers. With enough parliamentary support, the MPRP exited the powersharing government with the DP in January 2006. Following the collapse of Elbegdorj's cabinet, MPRP leader Miyeegombyn Enkhbold assumed the premiership with the support of DP dissidents, notably the New National Party. He was later replaced with the MPRP's new chairman, Sanjiin Bayar, in 2007. Bayar formed an MPRP-led cabinet with only the Civil Will Party as partner.

On 1 April 2006, a party convention elected Tsakhiagiin Elbegdorj as the party leader to fill in the vacancy after Gonchigdorj resigned. Four candidates had run for the party leadership elections in the first round. Elbegdorj won 46% of the vote, Erdeniin Bat-Uul won 40% and two other candidates won the rest. Without an absolute majority, a second ballot between the leading candidates resulted in Elbegdorj winning with 57.2% of the votes.

=== 2008–2012 ===
In the 2008 parliamentary elections, the DP won 28 seats. A protest against electoral fraud on 1 July 2008 turned into a riot when preliminary results showed the MPRP in a lead. The political upheaval, which caused Mongolia's first state of emergency and subsequent deaths of 5 people by the police, brought about the DP and the MPRP to form a coalition government in September 2008. On 30 August 2008, the National Consultative Committee elected Norovyn Altankhuyag as the new party chairman. Within the second cabinet of Sanjiin Bayar, party leader Norovyn Altankhuyag became First Deputy Prime Minister with even party distribution of cabinet positions.

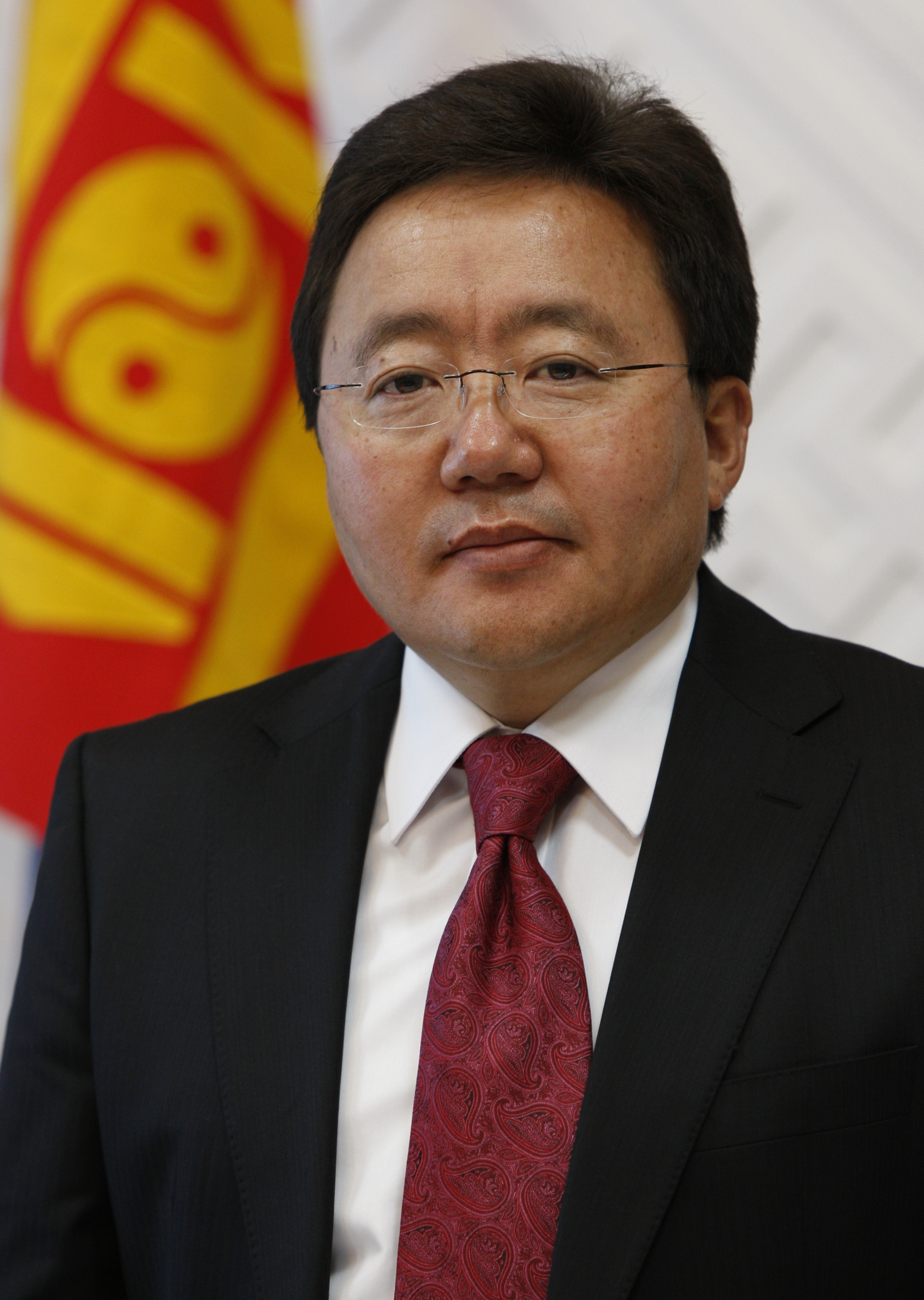
Tsakhiagiin Elbegdorj, the first DP President (2009–2013)

On 3 April 2009, Tsakhiagiin Elbegdorj defeated Erdeniin Bat-Üül with 65.3% of the total vote at the DP's presidential primaries. His candidacy was endorsed by the Civic Will Party and the Mongolian Green Party, both of which were eligible to run in the race. Elbegdorj won the 2009 presidential election on 24 May 2009 with 51.21% of the votes. Defeating incumbent president Nambaryn Enkhbayar who got 47.41%. Elbegdorj was sworn into office as President of Mongolia on 18 June 2009.

The DP remained a coalition partner to the MPRP after prime minister Bayar resigned due to declining health in October 2009. The cabinet structure remained intact under succeeding prime minister Sükhbaataryn Batbold, later elected the MPRP chairperson in 2010. However, the governing coalition received backlash for increased corruption, loss of government accountability, and lack of political checks and balances. In January 2012, the DP departed from the cabinet in the lead up to the legislative election and the municipal elections, which were scheduled on the same day.

=== 2012–2016 ===
Logo of the Democratic Party (2012–2017)

In the 2012 parliamentary election, the party won 34 seats, only a handful short of the simple majority requirement to unilaterally govern. Consequently, the DP partnered with ex-president Nambaryn Enkhbayar's Mongolian People's Revolutionary Party, the Mongolian National Democratic Party (renamed from New National Party), and Civil Will–Green Party to form a government under Norovyn Altankhuyag's premiership. The DP also secured its first ever majority in the Ulaanbaatar City Council. DP leader in Ulaanbaatar, Erdeniin Bat-Üül, was appointed Mayor of Ulaanbaatar in August 2012.

The party's ascension to power coincided with a rapid economic boom largely attributed to the country's mining mega-projects, with The Economist dubbing the country Mine-golia.

On 7 May 2013, Elbegdorj was re-nominated by the NPC with 100% votes. The next day, on 8 May 2013, he received full support from the party's National Convention with 7,000 participants in Ulaanbaatar plus rural participants. The Civil Will–Green Party and the Mongolian National Democratic Party – junior coalition partners – endorsed Elbegdorj, while the extra-parliamentary Republican Party and the Motherland Party also expressed their full support for his candidacy.

Elbegdorj won the 2013 presidential election with 50.23% of the ballot while Badmaanyambuugiin Bat-Erdene, candidate of the renamed Mongolian People's Party (MPP), received 41.97%, and Natsagiin Udval, candidate of Mongolian People's Revolutionary Party, got 6.5% of total votes.

During its first two years in power, the government introduced a number of large-scale bonds, with the most significant ones being the Chinggis Bond and the Samurai Bond to fund its ambitious infrastructure projects. Later in 2021, a parliamentary investigation into the Development Bank of Mongolia found massive mismanagement and favouritism in the loan selection process, prompting the country's anti-corruption agency to launch a full-scale investigation into Altankhuyag's involvement in the scandal.

In 2014, DP lawmakers ousted Altankhuyag from the party leadership and the premiership, partly due to his failure to reach an investment agreement with Rio Tinto, and appointed Chimediin Saikhanbileg as successor. Parliamentary speaker Zandaakhüügiin Enkhbold assumed the leadership in a NPC plenum on 14 November 2014. In 2015, the stagnation of the Chinese economic growth severely impacted Mongolia's economic prospects and damaged the mineral prices, which the country heavily relied on. The country went into an economic recession, with the GDP shrinking by about 1% and declining foreign direct investment (FDI).

In 2015, prime minister Saikhanbileg negotiated finance agreement of the Oyu Tolgoi project, the country's largest mega-project, and a struck a deal with Rio Tinto and other investors, which was colloquially named the Dubai Agreement. Despite proceeding the stalled underground mine expansion of Oyu Tolgoi, the agreement was heavily scrutinised both within and outside the party: Mongolia wouldn't profit from the project at least until 2034. Party leader and speaker Enkhbold and several opposition MPP lawmakers condemned the move. In 2016, just a few weeks before his end of term, Saikhanbileg's cabinet relinquished its exclusive right to purchase the 49% stake in the Erdenet mine when the Russian side decided to sell it – without any parliamentary authorization. FDI recovered starting from 2015 but by 2016, the economic forecast of Mongolia's growth by the IMF was just at 0.4%.

=== 2016–2020 ===
In the 2016 parliamentary election, the DP lost heavily, retaining only nine seats despite securing 33% of the national vote. The MPP won a supermajority of 65 seats with 45% of the vote. With just 2% decrease in the national vote, the electoral law, passed by the DP to promote two-party politics, ended up lossing them 25 of their 34 seats. High-ranking party officials, including chairman Enkhbold and Saikhanbileg, were unseated. The following year, an internal congress elected Sodnomzunduin Erdene as party chairman. During his tenure, the DP sought to reorganize its structure, strengthen its grassroots branches, and improve candidate selection processes. The party held three national campaigns to renew the party's ideology and fundamental principles upon the suggestions of its members and supporters in 2017.

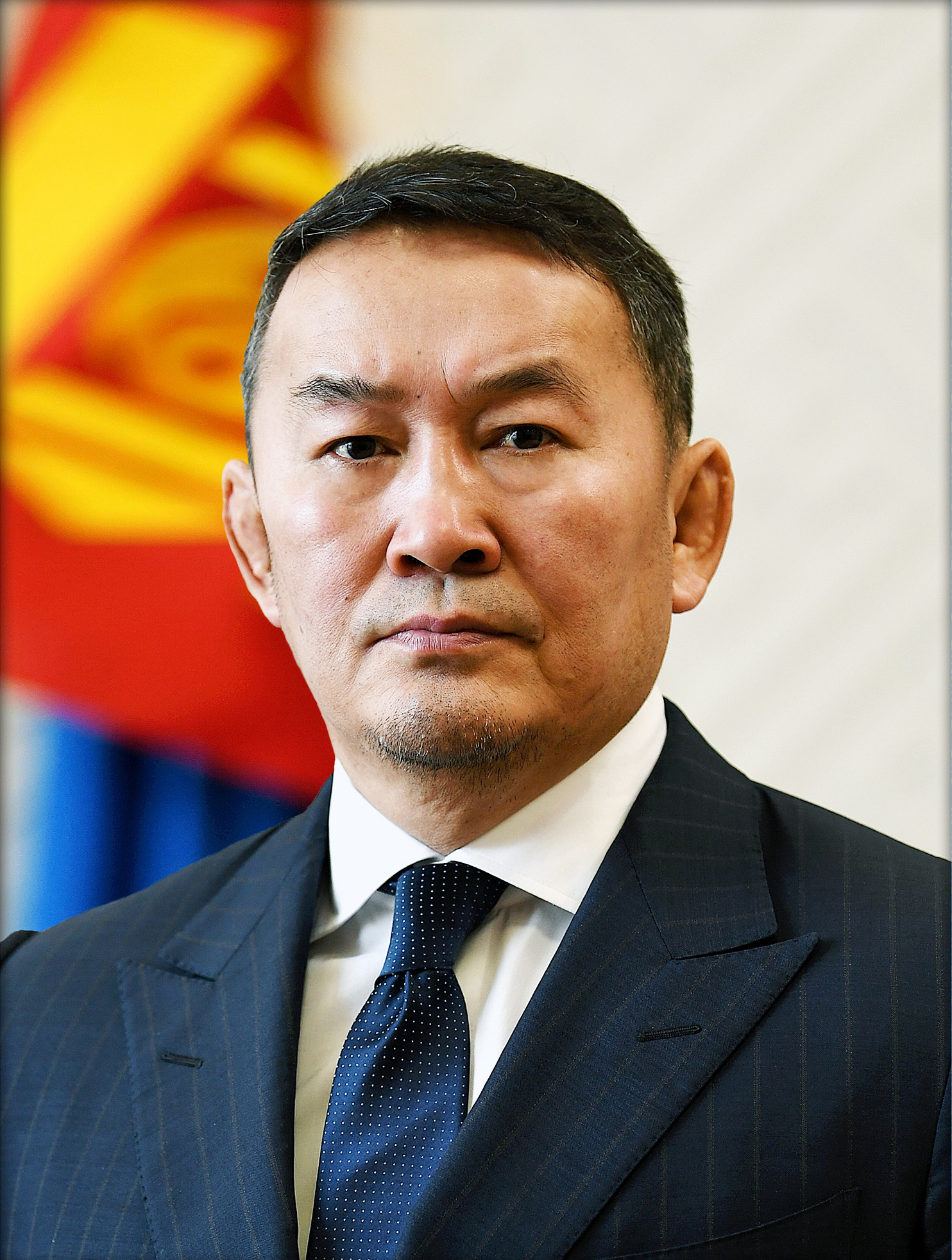
Khaltmaagiin Battulga, the second DP President (2017–2021)

In the 2017 presidential race, the party's nominee, Khaltmaagiin Battulga, narrowly won the country's first ever second round of voting, giving the DP the presidency even though it remained a minority in parliament. The defeat of MPP chairman Miyeegombyn Enkhbold caused changes of the MPP's factional dynamics in 2017 and later in 2018 which led to his ousting as speaker.

During Erdene's tenure, the party positioned itself as the main opposition force, frequently criticizing the MPP on issues such as economic management, transparency, and judicial independence. In April 2018, former prime minister Chimediin Saikhanbileg and ex-finance minister Sangajavyn Bayartsogt were arrested by the anti-corruption agency alongside several other officials centered around mining investment deals in 2009 and 2013. The arrests and court decisions were criticized by some as political interference, speculated to be from Battulga, in the judiciary.

In late 2018, three DP lawmakers voted in favour of the MPP prime minister Ukhnaagiin Khürelsükh during a motion of no confidence which coincited with a crisis in the MPP. The DP minority caucus held all three accountable for differing stance. The decision to kick Jalbasürengiin Batzandan from the party caused Luvsanvandangiin Bold to leave and found the Citizens' Coalition for Justice Party with Batzandan in mid 2019. Consequently, the DP's minority caucus was disestablished due to a lack of seats.

On 26 March 2019, a controversial anti-corruption law was proposed by president Battulga. The legislation, which allowed further presidential oversight over the judiciary, provoked a constitutional crisis after its swift passing overnight. Serious concerns for judicial independence and separation of powers were raised by several DP politicians and lawmakers. Several judges, prosecutors, and chiefs were dismissed over corruption allegations by the National Security Council, chaired by the president, between March and June 2019. The legislation was followed by drafting of constitutional amendments in June 2019 and later finalization by the MPP-controlled State Great Khural in November 2019. Under the changes, the maximum two 4-year presidential term was limited to a single 6-year term. Term limits on president Battulga remained somewhat ambiguous as the initial grandfather clause wasn't put forward in the final draft.

=== 2020–2024 ===
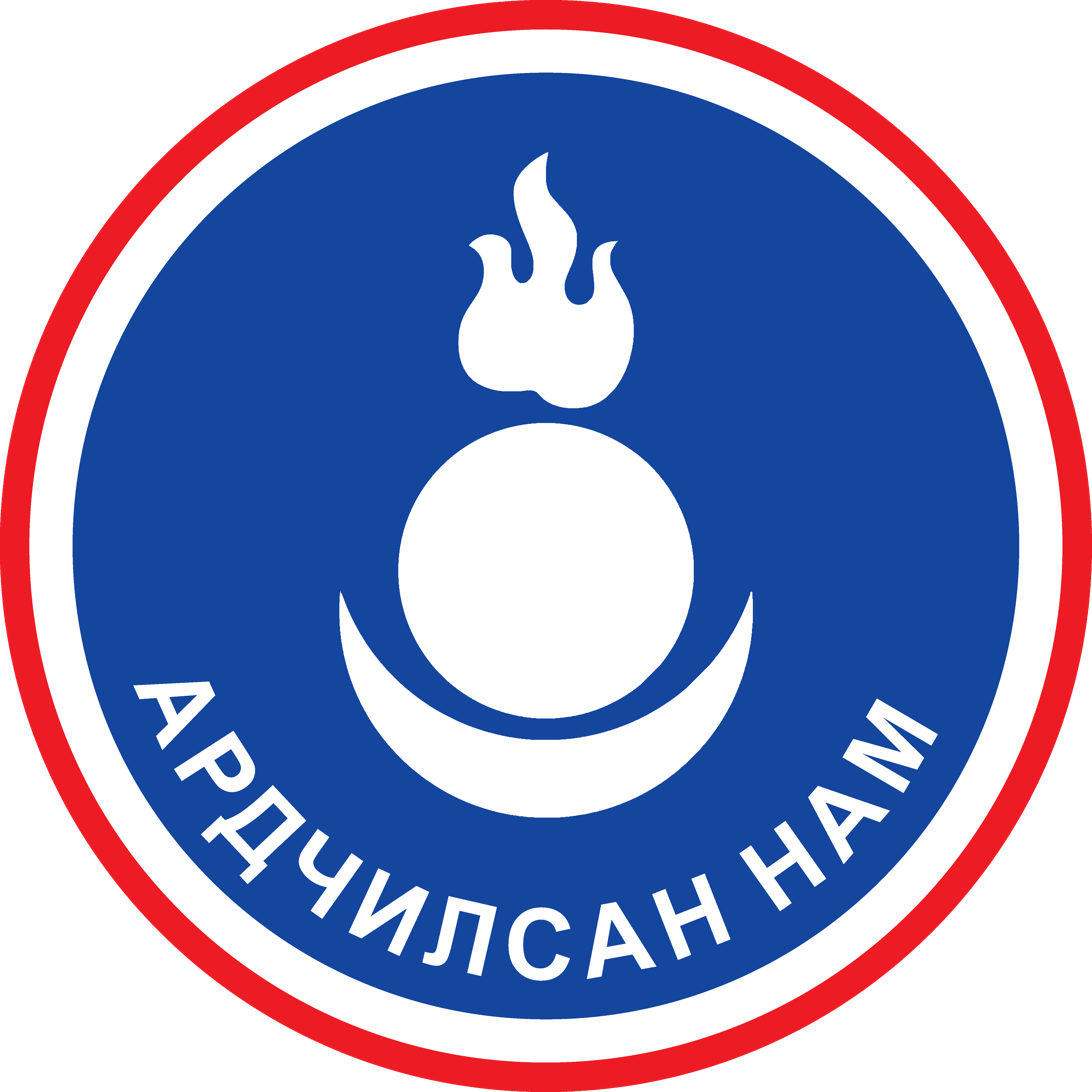
Logo of the Democratic Party (2017–2026)

In the 2020 parliamentary election, the party secured only 11 seats, leaving the MPP with another supermajority. Party infighting led to a high amount of senior DP members to run independently, including former prime minister Norovyn Altankhuyag and mayor Erdeniin Bat-Üül. Party chairman Erdene lost his own seat while Altankhuyag was elected as an independent.

After the electoral defeat, Erdene announced his resignation as chair and transferred interim roles to MP-elect Tsevegdorjyn Tuvaan in July 2020 until a new chair was elected. The party made substantial gains in the October local elections. The next party congress for renewed charter was delayed due to local COVID-19 outbreak and held online in mid December 2020. However, later that month, Erdene re-entered the scene after months of silence and caused a leadership dispute in a "move against Battulga's presidential nomination." He appealled the registration authority to nullify Tuvaan's stamp and create a new stamp for him, "the legally registered party chair." In January 2021, a complex legal dispute arose when the Supreme Court refused to register Erdene as party chair, while also declining to approve the December 2020 charter changes, citing conflicts with the party's existing charter. Both stamps weren't recognized by the courts.

In the coming months, the factionalized party divided on the matter of re-nominating incumbent president Battulga for the upcoming presidential election in 2021. In February 2021, political infightings within the DP reached a new point when both Erdene and Tuvaan relieved each other from their post. Few prominent figures including Tsedevdambyn Oyungerel, Erdeniin Bat-Üül, and Rinchinnyamyn Amarjargal backed Erdene. By late March 2021, the DP effectively split into pro and anti-Battulga camps led by chairman-elects Odongiin Tsogtgerel and Mainbayaryn Tulgat, respectively. Neither of the two leaders was officially recognized by the Supreme Court.

In 16 April 2021, the Constitutional Court upheld the single six-year term limit, preventing re-election of president Battulga, who remained still popular among the public. A presidential decree disbanding the MPP was issued by Battulga later in April 2021. On 29 April 2021, the strategic merger of the splinter MPRP with the MPP led to its sole legislator Sainkhüügiin Ganbaatar defecting to the DP. Consequently, the de facto number of DP seats increased to 13 (including Altankhuyag).

Two separate presidential primaries were held by both factions on 1 May 2021. Due to the party disunity, Norovyn Altankhuyag was nominated by the Tsogtgerel-led faction, whilst Erdene was nominated by the Tulgat-led faction. Erdene's self-nomination caused nearly all other candidates, the entire DP parliamentary caucus, and local chapters to distance and back Altankhuyag.

The General Election Commission (GEC) controversially accepted the registration materials of Erdene on 5 May 2021, formally confirming him as the DP's candidate in the 2021 presidential election. The decision was made on the basis of his legal status as leader in 2017. The refusal of Altankhuyag's candidacy immediately caused supporters of Altankhuyag and five DP lawmakers to protest and launch a hunger strike at Sükhbaatar Square. Erdene campaigned on a platform of democratic values, anti-corruption, and economic recovery. However, he came in last in the three-way election with 5.9% of the popular vote, losing the presidency to MPP leader Ukhnaagiin Khürelsükh and suffering the party's worst-ever presidential defeat. Compared to the 20% vote share of the Right Person Electorate Coalition, the DP share was only a thousand vote higher than the protest vote.

The period from 2021 to 2023 was marked by parallel party structures supporting either Erdene or former president Battulga. On 31 March 2022, the Supreme Court's ruling in favour of the anti-Battulga faction effectively reaffirmed Erdene's authority until the party's next internal congress. Later in May 2022, ex-president Khaltmaagiin Battulga was selected as the DP's new chairman, but due to the division his selection was challenged and his official filing to the Supreme Court was stalled. Erdene legally remained as chairman and active in preparing organisation for the upcoming election, before handing over leadership to former education minister and chairman-elect Luvsannyamyn Gantömör in January 2023. The stamp dispute between predecessors was ignored by Gantömör following his decision to commission a new party stamp.

=== 2024–present ===
In the 2024 parliamentary election, the DP gained 31 seats in the expanded parliament. The MPP secured a slim majority of 68 seats in the State Great Khural. Subsequently, on July 9, re-appointed prime minister Luvsannamsrain Oyun-Erdene formed a coalition government consisting of the three largest parliamentary blocs–the MPP, the DP, and the HUN Party. However, his tenure was cut short within a year in June 2025. During the ongoing anti-government protests, prime minister Oyun-Erdene resigned after losing a motion of confidence, in which DP lawmakers absented following the DP's expulsion from the cabinet. Succeeding premier Gombojavyn Zandanshatar, appointed from the MPP, formed a coalition government between the MPP, the HUN Party, and the Civil Will–Green Party on 18 June 2025.

On 31 August 2025, Gantömör, who served as First Deputy Prime Minister from 2024 to 2025, resigned as party chairman, and the party's National Policy Committee elected party caucus leader Odongiin Tsogtgerel as the next chairman. Following a political crisis within the MPP, the new party chairman Nyam-Osoryn Uchral assumed the duties of speaker in November 2025.

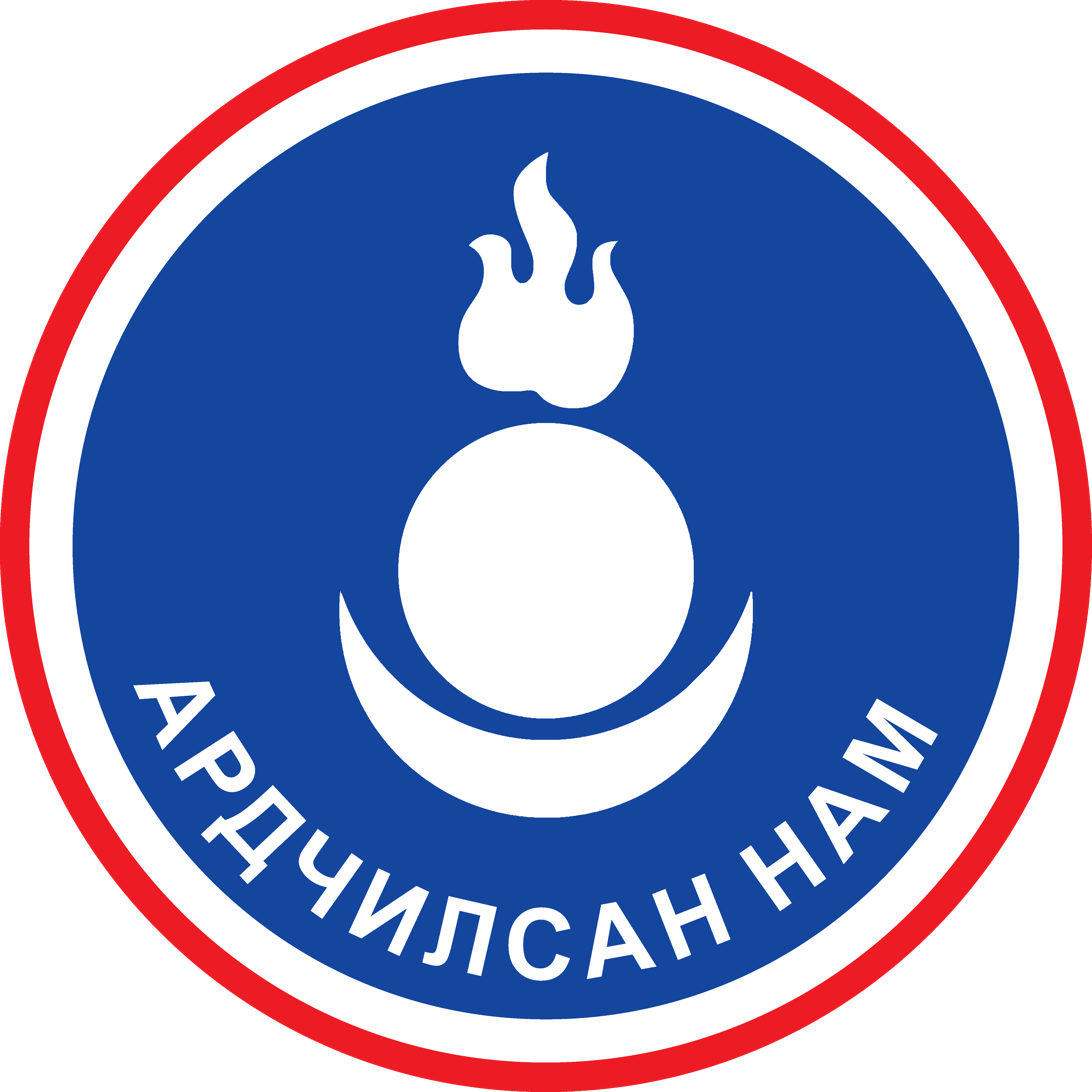
Party emblem and flag changes before (left) and after (right)

On 9 January 2026, the Supreme Court officially registered the DP's changes to their charter, emblem, and flag made during their August 2025 National Convention.

The increasing cabinet size and nomination of MPP leader as speaker were met with harsh criticism from the DP, which later threatened to boycott all parliamentary procedures and motions, citing power concentration by the MPP. On the spring plenary session of the State Great Khural in March 2026, party leader Tsogtgerel stated, "It is inappropriate for the chairman of a multi-party parliament to simultaneously hold the role of party chair," and announced a parliamentary boycott amid growing economic uncertainties by the Strait of Hormuz crisis. Despite the MPP's majority to fulfill the 64-seat quorum, the absence of several MPP lawmakers allied to Oyun-Erdene led to a political deadlock. The renewed opposition ultimately led to the resignation of prime minister Zandanshatar on 30 March 2026. Zandanshatar was succeeded by Nyam-Osoryn Uchral.

The DP announced no intentions of joining Uchral's new cabinet. Without the DP's 42 seats, Uchral unveiled his cabinet, comprising the MPP, the HUN, and the National Coalition, to the State Great Khural on 3 April 2026, which was sworn later on 4 April. In April 2026, Sangajavyn Bayartsogt was appointed acting Secretary-General of the DP, following a decision supported by the party’s Political Council.

== Ideology and positions ==
According to its party charter, the Democratic Party is a centre-right party which protects national sovereignty, national interests, the constitutional parliamentary framework, civil liberties, private ownership, the free market, and rule of law in Mongolia. As a member of the International Democracy Union, the party has been described as liberal conservative by party leaders and political analysts. Alongside democratic values, the party holds national, individual, economic, and political freedom as its core values. The party and its predecessors have been historically defined as "anti-communist" during Mongolia's transition from socialism to democracy in the 1990s.

The party's position of Mongolian nationalism, distinct from ethnic nationalism, advocates for national sovereignty and the preservation of Mongolia's national identity. Economic liberalism has generally been the party's self-proclaimed economic policy, with populist factions within the party favouring resource nationalism, which asserts more control over the country's mineral resources. However, after its election defeat in 2016, the party adopted a more pragmatic approach to national development. The renewed concept favours sustainable development policy suited to Mongolian circumstances, rejecting any ideological doctrines or economic doctrines as Mongolia’s guiding model. In a 2021 article, the party's working group for ideological renewal argued that Mongolia has yet to fully consolidate a humane, civil, and democratic society, and that the party supports continuing to build one.

== Structure ==
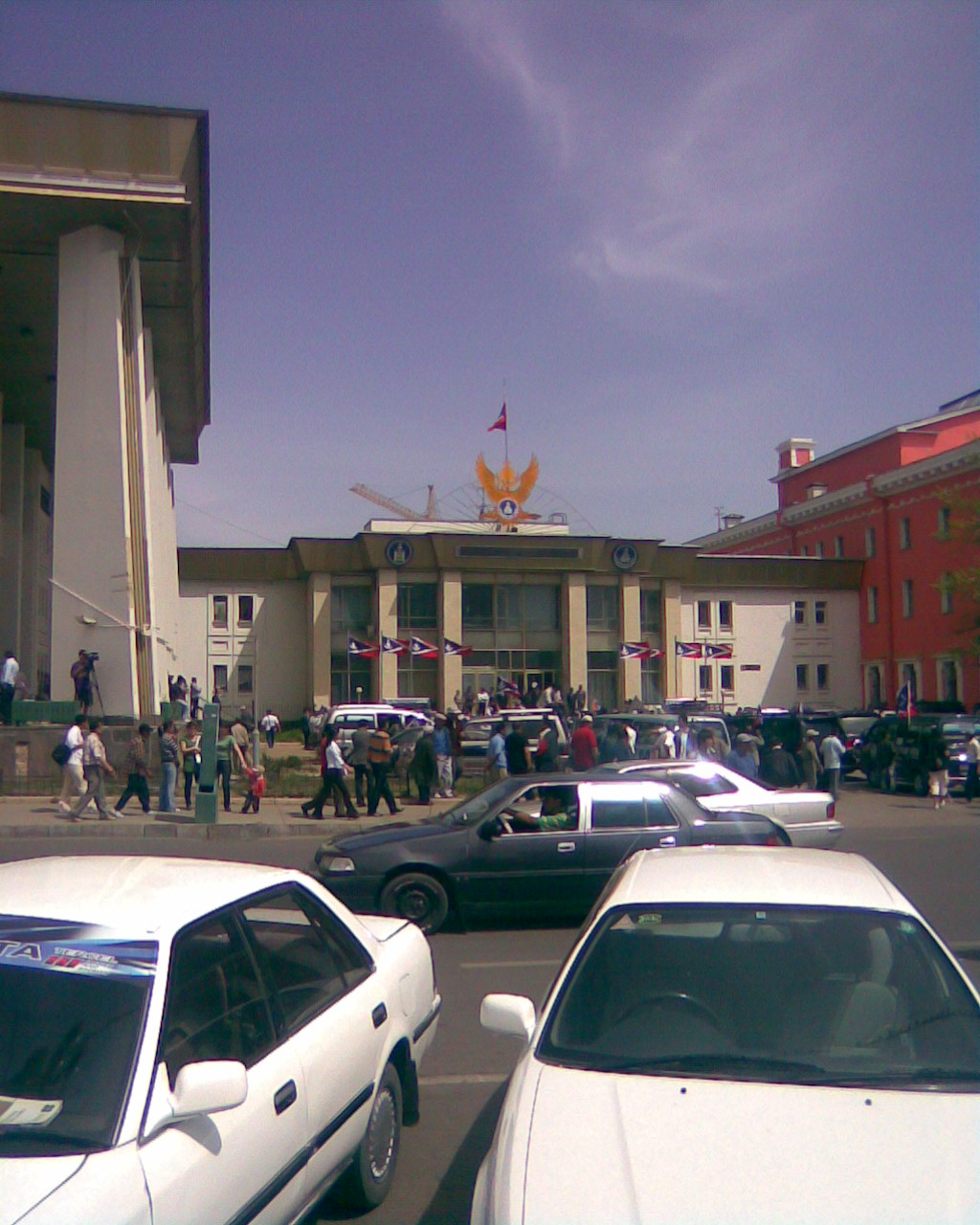
Now-demolished DP headquarters (Ардчиллын Өргөө) at Sükhbaatar Square, Ulaanbaatar, in 2009

The party is organised on national, provincial, municipal, and district levels. Currently, the party has around 30 provincial party associations and 432 grassroots organisations.

- National Convention (NC): Each provincial, municipal, and district level association sends delegates to the National Convention, which is held regularly every 4 years. The National Convention is formally the supreme body of the party and can be convened by the chairman or majority of the National Policy Committee.
- National Policy Committee (NPC): The highest organ when the National Convention is not in session. No more than two times a year, NPC is organised, and its members must be three times of the total seats in the State Great Khural. Since 2024, the NPC consists of 378 members, an increase of its previous size of 228 members.
- Political Council: Elected by the NPC, the Political Council is the main executive body of the party. Its total members are equal to 10% of the total amount of NPC members, currently 37.

=== Affiliated organisations ===
The Democratic Party has the following affiliated groups and organisations.

- Democratic Students' Union
- Democratic Youth Union
- Democratic Women's Union
- Democratic Elders' Union

=== Chairman ===
- Dambiin Dorligjav (2000–2002)
- Mendsaikhany Enkhsaikhan (2002–2005)
- Radnaasümbereliin Gonchigdorj (2005–2006)
- Tsakhiagiin Elbegdorj (2006–2008)
- Norovyn Altankhuyag (2008–2014)
- Zandaakhuugiin Enkhbold (2014–2017)
- Sodnomzunduin Erdene (2017–2023)
- Luvsannyamyn Gantömör (2023–2025)
- Odongiin Tsogtgerel (2025–present)

== Electoral history ==
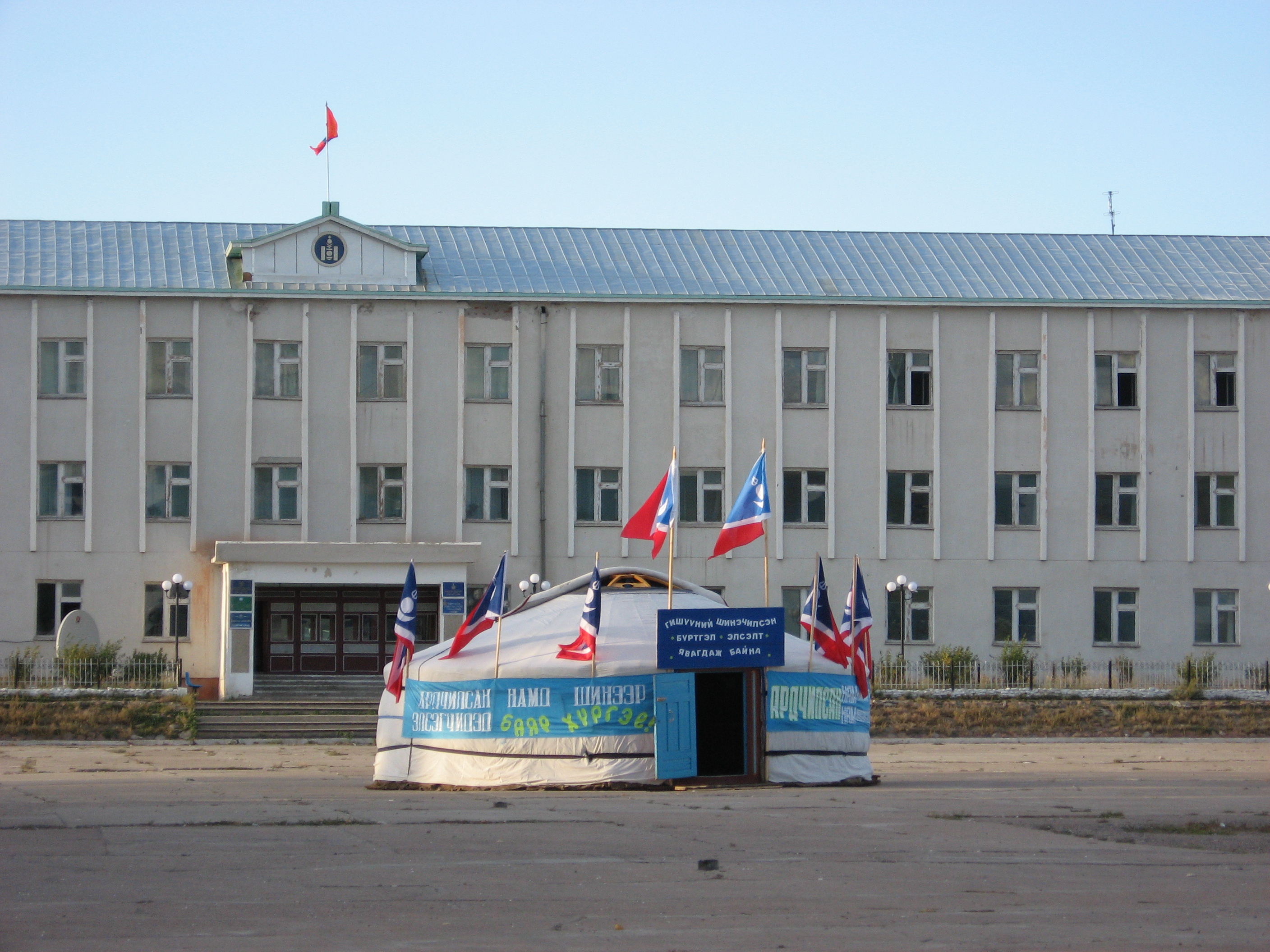
Ger set up by the DP for a by-election campaign in Khövsgöl Province, 2006

=== Presidential elections ===
Election	Party candidate	Votes	%	Result
2001	Radnaasümbereliin Gonchigdorj	365,363	37.18%	Lost ✗
2005	Mendsaikhany Enkhsaikhan	186,646	20.31%	Lost ✗
2009	Tsakhiagiin Elbegdorj	562,718	51.85%	Elected ✓
2013	Tsakhiagiin Elbegdorj	622,794	50.33%	Elected ✓
2017	Khaltmaagiin Battulga	611,226	50.61%	Elected ✓
2021	Sodnomzunduin Erdene	72,832	5.99%	Lost ✗

=== State Great Khural elections ===
Election	Leader	Seats		Position	Constituency		Party list		Status
Election	Leader	No.	+/–	Position	Votes	%	Votes	%	Status
2004 (Note: Ran as part of the Motherland Democratic Coalition with the Motherland Party and the Civil Will–Republican Party. The coalition won a total of 34 seats.)	Mendsaikhany Enkhsaikhan	26 / 76	▲26	2nd	474,977	44.74%			Coalition government (2004–2006)
2004	Mendsaikhany Enkhsaikhan	26 / 76	▲26	2nd	474,977	44.74%			Opposition (2006–2008)
2008	Tsakhiagiin Elbegdorj	28 / 76	▲2	2nd	701,641	40.43%			Coalition government (until 2012)
2008	Tsakhiagiin Elbegdorj	28 / 76	▲2	2nd	701,641	40.43%			Opposition (since 2012)
2012	Norovyn Altankhuyag	34 / 76	▲6	▲1st	813,878	34.33%	399,247	35.32%	Governing coalition
2016	Zandaakhüügiin Enkhbold	9 / 76	▼25	▼2nd	467,341	33.55%			Opposition
2020	Sodnomzunduin Erdene	11 / 76	▲2	2nd	978,890	24.49%			Opposition
2024	Luvsannyamyn Gantömör	42 / 126	▲31	2nd	3,135,988	33.48%	438,506	30.13%	Coalition government (2024–2025)
2024	Luvsannyamyn Gantömör	42 / 126	▲31	2nd	3,135,988	33.48%	438,506	30.13%	Opposition (since 2025)
