= List of members of the State Great Khural, 2016–2020 =

2016-2020 State Great Khural
←	2012–2016	2020–2024	→
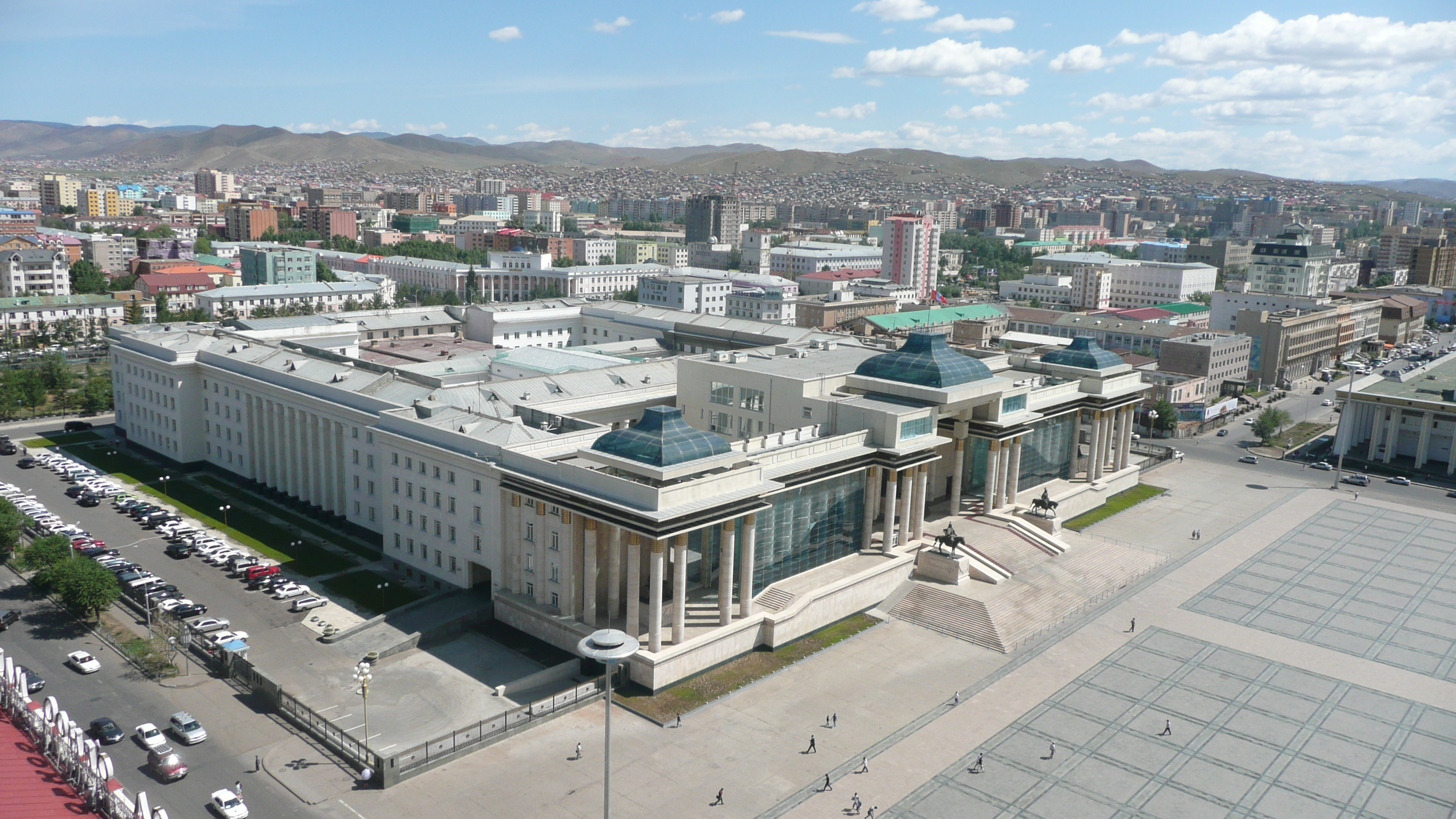
- Government Palace of Mongolia

Overview
- Legislative body: State Great Khural
- Jurisdiction: Mongolia
- Meeting place: Government Palace, Ulaanbaatar, Mongolia
- Term: 5 July 2016 – 30 June 2020
- Election: 29 June 2016
- Government: Erdenebat government (until 4 October 2017); Khürelsükh government (since 4 October 2017)
- Website: www.parliament.mn

State Great Khural
- Members: 76
- Chairman: Miyeegombyn Enkhbold (until 1 February 2019); Gombojavyn Zandanshatar (since 1 February 2019)
- Deputy Chairmen: Tsendiin Nyamdorj (until 2017); Luvsantserengiin Enkh-Amgalan (since 2017); Yadamsürengiin Sanjmyatav
- Prime Minister: Jargaltulgyn Erdenebat (until 4 October 2017); Ukhnaagiin Khürelsükh (since 4 October 2017)
- Party control: Supermajority of the Mongolian People's Party

The 2016–2020 State Great Khural was the seventh session of the State Great Khural, which first convened on 5 July 2016 and remained in session until 30 June 2020. Its members were first elected in the 2016 parliamentary election held on 29 June 2016.

== Composition ==
In the 2016 parliamentary election, three political parties and one independent were elected to the parliament. By June 2020, the State Great Khural comprised three parties; the Mongolian People's Revolutionary Party lost its only seat, whilst the Citizens' Coalition for Justice Party gained two seats. Three members of parliament were relieved from their duties, thereby three seats were vacant.

Party	Original elected seats	Seats prior the 2020 elections			Floor leader
Party	Total	±	Total	%	Floor leader
Mongolian People's Party	65	▼3	62	84.9%	Damdiny Khayankhyarvaa (2016–2018); Dulamdorjiin Togtokhsüren (2018–2020)
Democratic Party	9	Steady	9	12.3%	Sodnomzunduin Erdene (2016–2017); Dondogdorjiin Erdenebat (2017–2020)
Mongolian People's Revolutionary Party	1	▼1	0	0.0%	—N/a
Citizens' Coalition for Justice Party	—N/a	▲2	2	2.7%	—N/a
Independent	1	▼1	0	0.0%	—N/a
Totals	76	—	73	100.0%	

== List of members ==
Constituency		Member		Party	Notes
Arkhangai	1st	Ganzorigiin Temüülen	Ганзоригийн Тэмүүлэн	Mongolian People's Party	
Arkhangai	2nd	Yondonperenlein Baatarbileg	Ёндонпэрэнлэйн Баатарбилэг	Mongolian People's Party	
Arkhangai	3rd	Jamyangiin Mönkhbat	Жамъянгийн Мөнхбат	Mongolian People's Party	
Bayan-Ölgii	4th	Gombojain Soltan	Гомбожайн Солтан	Mongolian People's Party	
Bayan-Ölgii	5th	Khavdislamyn Badyelkhan	Хавдисламын Баделхан	Mongolian People's Party	
Bayan-Ölgii	6th	Dakein Murat	Дакейн Мурат	Democratic Party	
Bayankhongor	7th	Gombojavyn Zandanshatar	Гомбожавын Занданшатар	Mongolian People's Party	Chairman of the State Great Khural from February 2019.
Bayankhongor	8th	Magvany Bilegt	Магваны Билэгт	Mongolian People's Party	
Bayankhongor	9th	Lkhagvaagiin Eldev-Ochir	Лхагваагийн Элдэв-Очир	Mongolian People's Party	
Bulgan	10th	Jadambyn Bat-Erdene	Жадамбын Бат-Эрдэнэ	Mongolian People's Party	
Govi-Altai	11th	Shatarbalyn Radnaased	Шатарбалын Раднаасэд	Mongolian People's Party	
Govisümber, Dornogovi	12th	Gompildoogiin Mönkhtsetseg	Гомпилдоогийн Мөнхцэцэг	Mongolian People's Party	
Govisümber, Dornogovi	13th	Borkhüügiin Delgersaikhan	Борхүүгийн Дэлгэрсайхан	Mongolian People's Party	
Dornod	14th	Khayangaagiin Bolorchuluun	Хаянгаагийн Болорчулуун	Mongolian People's Party	
Dornod	15th	~~Nyamtaishiryn Nomtoibayar~~	~~Нямтайширын Номтойбаяр~~	~~Mongolian People's Party~~	Kicked from the MPP and relieved from MP duties in 2020.
Dundgovi	16th	Batsükhiin Narankhüü	Батсүхийн Наранхүү	Democratic Party	
Zavkhan	17th	Yadamsürengiin Sanjmyatav	Ядамсүрэнгийн Санжмятав	Democratic Party	
Zavkhan	18th	Zagdkhüügiin Narantuya	Загдхүүгийн Нарантуяа	Democratic Party	
Övörkhangai	19th	Yangugiin Sodbaatar	Янгугийн Содбаатар	Mongolian People's Party	
Övörkhangai	20th	Dulamdorjiin Togtokhsüren	Дуламдоржийн Тогтохсүрэн	Mongolian People's Party	
Övörkhangai	21st	Sodnomyn Chinzorig	Содномын Чинзориг	Mongolian People's Party	
Ömnögovi	22nd	Namsrain Amarzayaa	Намсрайн Амарзаяа	Mongolian People's Party	
Ömnögovi	23rd	Luvsangiin Enkhbold	Лувсангийн Энхболд	Mongolian People's Party	
Sükhbaatar	24th	Chültemiin Ulaan	Чүлтэмийн Улаан	Mongolian People's Party	
Selenge	25th	Navaan-Yundengiin Oyundari	Наваан-Юндэнгийн Оюундарь	Mongolian People's Party	
Selenge	26th	Jargaltulgyn Erdenebat	Жаргалтулгын Эрдэнэбат	Mongolian People's Party	Prime Minister of Mongolia until 4 October 2017.
Selenge	27th	Dondogdorjiin Erdenebat	Дондогдоржийн Эрдэнэбат	Democratic Party	
Töv	28th	Miyeegombyn Enkhbold	Миеэгомбын Энхболд	Mongolian People's Party	Dismissed as Chairman of the State Great Khural on 29 January 2019.
Töv	29th	Agvaansamdangiin Sükhbat	Агваансамдагийн Сүхбат	Mongolian People's Party	
Töv	30th	Nyamaagiin Enkhbold	Нямаагийн Энхболд	Mongolian People's Party	
Uvs	31st	Battogtokhyn Choijilsüren	Баттогтохын Чойжилсүрэн	Mongolian People's Party	
Uvs	32nd	Namsrain Tserenbat	Намсрайн Цэрэнбат	Mongolian People's Party	
Uvs	33rd	Chimediin Khürelbaatar	Чимэдийн Хүрэлбаатар	Mongolian People's Party	
Khovd	34th	Bökhchuluuny Pürevdorj	Бөхчулууны Пүрэвдорж	Democratic Party	
Khovd	35th	Sandagiin Byambatsogt	Сандагийн Бямбацогт	Mongolian People's Party	
Khovd	36th	Otgoogiin Batnasan	Отгоогийн Батнасан	Mongolian People's Party	
Khövsgöl	37th	Lkhagvyn Mönkhbaatar	Лхагвын Мөнхбаатар	Mongolian People's Party	
Khövsgöl	38th	Tserenpiliin Davaasüren	Цэрэнпилийн Даваасүрэн	Mongolian People's Party	
Khövsgöl	39th	Luvsantserengiin Enkh-Amgalan	Лувсанцэрэнгийн Энх-Амгалан	Mongolian People's Party	
Khentii	40th	Badmaanyambuugiin Bat-Erdene	Бадмаанямбуурийн Бат-Эрдэнэ	Mongolian People's Party	
Khentii	41st	Luvsannamsrain Oyun-Erdene	Лувсаннамсрайн Оюун-Эрдэнэ	Mongolian People's Party	
Khentii	42nd	~~Dorjdugaryn Gantulga~~	~~Дорждугарын Гантулга~~	Mongolian People's Party	Resigned on 14 June 2018.
Darkhan-Uul	43rd	Baagaagiin Battömör	Баагаагийн Баттөмөр	Mongolian People's Party	
Darkhan-Uul	44th	Boldyn Javkhlan	Болдын Жавхлан	Mongolian People's Party	
Darkhan-Uul	45th	Damdiny Khayankhyarvaa	Дамдины Хаянхярваа	Mongolian People's Party	
Orkhon	46th	Otgonbilegiin Sodbileg	Отгонбилэгийн Содбилэг	Mongolian People's Party	
Orkhon	47th	Oktyabriin Baasankhüü	Октябрийн Баасанхүү	~~Mongolian People's Revolutionary Party~~	
Orkhon	47th	Oktyabriin Baasankhüü	Октябрийн Баасанхүү	Democratic Party	Joined the DP in 2020.
Orkhon	48th	Dorjdambyn Damba-Ochir	Дорждамбын Дамба-Очир	Mongolian People's Party	
Ulaanbaatar Bayanzürkh	49th	Dulamsürengiin Oyuunkhorol	Дүламсүрэнгийн Оюунхорол	Mongolian People's Party	
Ulaanbaatar Bayanzürkh	50th	Jadambyn Enkhbayar	Жадамбын Энхбаяр	Mongolian People's Party	
Ulaanbaatar Bayanzürkh	51st	Batsükhiin Saranchimeg	Батсүхийн Саранчимэг	Mongolian People's Party	
Ulaanbaatar Bayanzürkh	52nd	~~Batjargalyn Batzorig~~	~~Батжаргалын Батзориг~~	Mongolian People's Party	Relieved from MP duties in 2020.
Ulaanbaatar Bayanzürkh	53rd	Jalbasürengiin Batzandan	Жалбасүрэнгийн Батзандан	~~Democratic Party~~	Kicked from the DP in December 2018.
Ulaanbaatar Bayanzürkh	53rd	Jalbasürengiin Batzandan	Жалбасүрэнгийн Батзандан	~~Independent~~	
Ulaanbaatar Bayanzürkh	53rd	Jalbasürengiin Batzandan	Жалбасүрэнгийн Батзандан	Citizens' Coalition for Justice Party	Founded the Citizens' Coalition for Justice Party with Bold in 2019.
Ulaanbaatar Bayanzürkh	54th	Samandyn Javkhlan	Самандын Жавхлан	~~Independent~~	
Ulaanbaatar Bayanzürkh	54th	Samandyn Javkhlan	Самандын Жавхлан	Democratic Party	Joined the DP in 2020.
Ulaanbaatar Bagakhangai, Khan-Uul	55th	Davaajantsangiin Sarangerel	Даваажанцангийн Сарангэрэл	Mongolian People's Party	
Ulaanbaatar Bagakhangai, Khan-Uul	56th	Tsendiin Nyamdorj	Цэндийн Нямдорж	Mongolian People's Party	
Ulaanbaatar Bagakhangai, Khan-Uul	57th	Luvsanvandangiin Bold	Лувсанвандангийн Болд	~~Democratic Party~~	
Ulaanbaatar Bagakhangai, Khan-Uul	57th	Luvsanvandangiin Bold	Лувсанвандангийн Болд	Citizens' Coalition for Justice Party	Founded the Citizens' Coalition for Justice Party with Batzandan in 2019.
Ulaanbaatar Bagakhangai, Khan-Uul	58th	Byambasürengiin Enkh-Amgalan	Бямбасүрэнгийн Энх-Амгалан	Mongolian People's Party	
Ulaanbaatar Baganuur, Sükhbaatar	59th	Damdiny Tsogtbaatar	Дамдины Цогтбаатар	Mongolian People's Party	
Ulaanbaatar Baganuur, Sükhbaatar	60th	Tsendiin Mönkh-Orgil	Цэндийн Мөнх-Оргил	Mongolian People's Party	
Ulaanbaatar Baganuur, Sükhbaatar	61st	Sükhbaataryn Batbold	Сүхбаатарын Батболд	Mongolian People's Party	
Ulaanbaatar Baganuur, Sükhbaatar	62nd	Tsedenbalyn Tsogzolmaa	Цэдэнбалын Цогзолмаа	Mongolian People's Party	
Ulaanbaatar Chingeltei, Nalaikh	63rd	Tömörbaataryn Ayuursaikhan	Төмөрбаатарын Аюурсайхан	Mongolian People's Party	
Ulaanbaatar Chingeltei, Nalaikh	64th	Mönkhöögiin Oyuunchimeg	Мөнхөөгийн Оюунчимэг	Mongolian People's Party	
Ulaanbaatar Chingeltei, Nalaikh	65th	Ölziisaikhany Enkhtüvshin	Өлзийсайханы Энхтүвшин	Mongolian People's Party	
Ulaanbaatar Chingeltei, Nalaikh	66th	Davaagiin Ganbold	Даваагийн Ганболд	Mongolian People's Party	
Ulaanbaatar Bayangol	67th	Agvaanluvsangiin Undraa	Агваанлувсангийн Ундраа	Mongolian People's Party	
Ulaanbaatar Bayangol	68th	Jambalyn Ganbaatar	Жамбалын Ганбаатар	Mongolian People's Party	
Ulaanbaatar Bayangol	69th	Sodnomzunduin Erdene	Содномзундуйн Эрдэнэ	Democratic Party	Chairman of the DP from 2016 to 2023.
Ulaanbaatar Bayangol	70th	Danzangiin Lündeejantsan	Данзангийн Лүндээжанцан	Mongolian People's Party	
Ulaanbaatar Songinokhairkhan	71st	Tsedengiin Garamjav	Цэдэнгийн Гарамжав	Mongolian People's Party	
Ulaanbaatar Songinokhairkhan	72nd	Nyam-Osoryn Uchral	Ням-Осорын Учрал	Mongolian People's Party	
Ulaanbaatar Songinokhairkhan	73rd	Dolgorsürengiin Sumyaabazar	Долгорсүрэнгийн Сумъяабазар	Mongolian People's Party	
Ulaanbaatar Songinokhairkhan	74th	Dendeviin Terbishdagva	Дэндэвийн Тэрбишдагва	Mongolian People's Party	
Ulaanbaatar Songinokhairkhan	75th	Batbayaryn Undarmaa	Батбаярын Ундармаа	Mongolian People's Party	
Ulaanbaatar Songinokhairkhan	76th	Khishgeegiin Nyambaatar	Хишгээгийн Нямбаатар	Mongolian People's Party	
