= Jalbasürengiin Batzandan =

Mongolian politician (born 1974)

- Жалбасүрэнгийн Батзандан
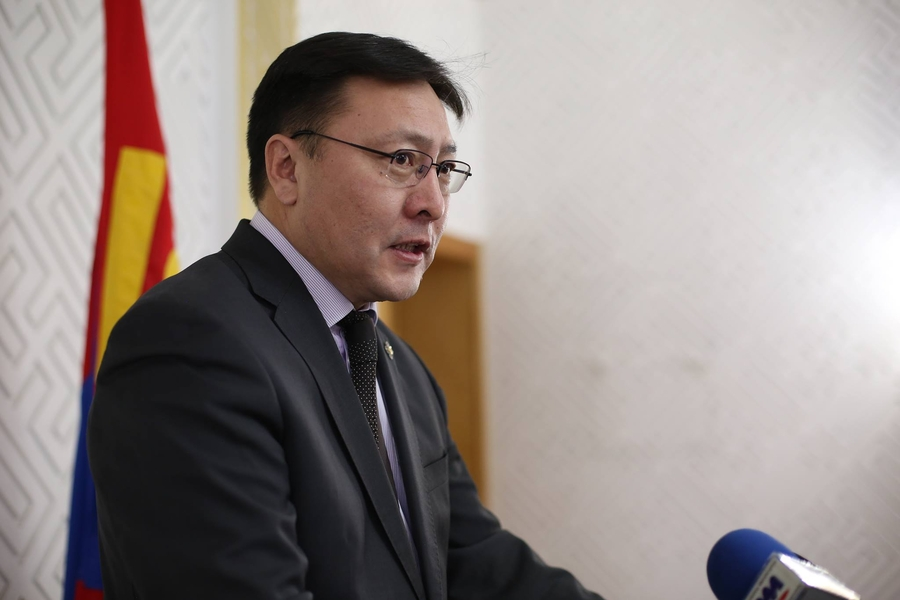
- Batzandan in 2022

Member of the State Great Khural
- In office 6 July 2012 – 30 June 2020
- Constituency: 53rd, Bayanzürkh district (2016–2020); 22nd, Bayanzürkh, Nalaikh district (2012–2016)

Personal details
- Born: 11 May 1974 (age 52) Baruun-Urt, Sükhbaatar, Mongolia
- Party: Democratic Party (–2019; since 2024); NEW Party (2019–2024)
- Education: National University of Mongolia; University of Miskolc

Jalbasürengiin Batzandan (Mongolian: Жалбасүрэнгийн Батзандан; born 11 May 1974) is a Mongolian politician who served as member of the State Great Khural in 2012 and 2016. As member of the Democratic Party, he was elected twice as a member of parliament (MP).

== Early life and education ==
Batzandan was born in Baruun-Urt, the provincial capital of Sükhbaatar Province, on 11 May 1974. Between 1982 and 1992, he studied at the 1st secondary school of Baruun-Urt. Later for a year, he studied at the School of Law, National University of Mongolia in 1993. Subsequently, in 1993, he studied political science and law at the University of Miskolc in Hungary. He graduated with a master's degree in political science and masters of law in 1999.

== Early career ==
In 2002, when Batzandan founded his first civic movement, he wrote an article on establishing a civil society movement which was published on multiple websites. The movement was officially organized in 2004 as the "Healthy Society, Civil Movement." In 2006, the movement was later reorganized as the Civil Movement Party with Batzandan as chairman from 2006 to 2010. The party ran for the 2008 parliamentary election but won no seats.

Consequently, Batzandan and party member Otgonjargalyn Magnai opposed the preliminary election results, which was alleged to be favouring the ruling Mongolian People's Revolutionary Party by multiple other opposition leaders. On 1 July 2008, demonstrations against the electoral fraud, amplified by opposition parties, turned into a riot. The riot, known locally as the July 1st riots, resulted in 5 deaths, over 300 injuries and the country's first ever state of emergency.

== Political career ==
=== Member of parliament ===
In the 2012 parliamentary election, Batzandan was elected as member of the State Great Khural from the then-opposition Democratic Party (DP). He was re-elected as MP in the 2016 parliamentary election. In late 2016, he unsuccessfully ran for the DP chairmanship elections.

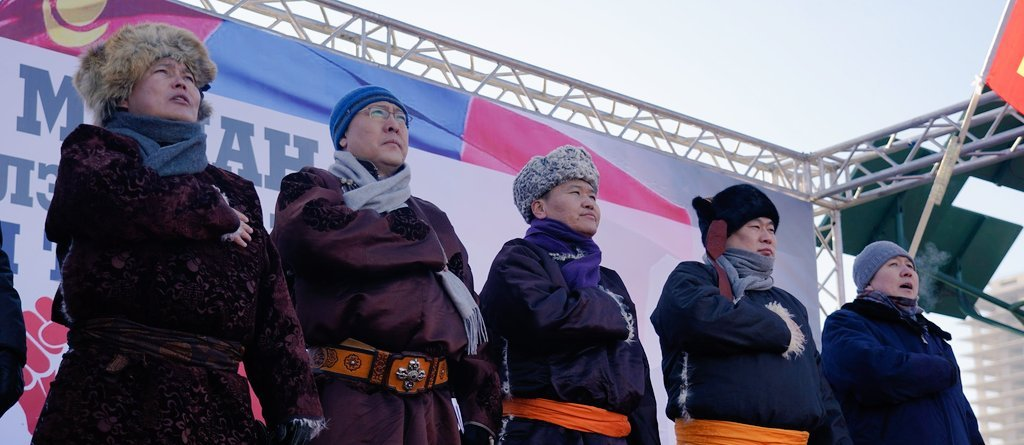
Batzandan (second from left) with Khishgeegiin Nyambaatar, Tömörbaataryn Ayuursaikhan, Luvsannamsrain Oyun-Erdene, and Luvsanvandangiin Bold during a mass protest on 27 December 2018

In late 2018, he and four other cross-party lawmakers organized and led the 2018–2019 Mongolian protests against parliamentary speaker Miyeegombyn Enkhbold, implicated in a 2016 corruption scandal. During the political upheaval, the cross-party lawmakers came to be self-known as the "Fair Five" (Шударга тав). Additionally, Batzandan was kicked from his own party, the DP, on 3 December 2018. Two mass popular protests were held on 27 December 2018 and 10 January 2019. Consequently, Enkhbold was dismissed by parliament on 29 January 2019.

=== Citizens' Coalition for Justice Party ===
In the lead up to the 2020 parliamentary election, Batzandan alongwith Democratic MP Luvsanvandangiin Bold, another affiliate of the Fair Five, founded the Citizens' Coalition for Justice Party with Batzandan as chairman on 6 June 2019. Later in 2020, the party formed a big tent electoral coalition, the "New Coalition", with several other extra-parliamentary parties and civic movements. The coalition came in fourth place but didn't win any parliamentary seats during the election. Following their defeat, the party reformed itself as the NEW Party with Tsendsürengiin Gantulga as leader. In May 2024, prior to the 2024 parliamentary election, Batzandan left the party and re-joined the DP.

In the subsequent 2024 election, Batzandan ran as the DP candidate for the 4th multi-member constituency of Bulgan, Khövsgöl, and Orkhon Provinces. However, with only 33.2% of the constituency vote, he came in 11th, falling just three spots short of a parliamentary seat.
