= 2018–2019 Mongolian protests =

Protests in Mongolia against government corruption

- Date: November 2018 – 10 January 2019 (2 months)
- Location: Ulaanbaatar, Mongolia
- Caused by: Corruption; High profile scandals; Poverty and inequality; Alleged government conspiracy
- Goals: End to corruption; Resignation of Miyeegombyn Enkhbold and affiliates; Dissolution of the State Great Khural
- Methods: Demonstrations; online activism; sit-ins
- Result: Protests partially successful: Dismissal of speaker Miyeegombyn Enkhbold on 29 January 2019; Gombojavyn Zandanshatar appointed as next parliamentary speaker on 1 February 2019; Anti-corruption law, empowering president Khaltmaagiin Battulga's oversight over the judiciary, ratified on 27 March 2019; Dismissal of anti-corruption chief, Supreme Court chief justice and prosecutor general by the president in March 2019; 2019 Mongolian constitutional crisis; Constitutional amendments in late November 2019

Parties
| Protestors: (non central leadership): Five cross-party lawmakers; Non-governmental organisations; Civil Will–Green Party | Government of Mongolia; Ministry of Justice and Internal Affairs; National Police Agency; Internal Troops; Mongolian People's Party |

The 2018–2019 Mongolian protests were a series of mass demonstrations and popular protests against the government after the unravelling of widespread web of corruption by high-ranking officials. The main phase of the anti-government protests occurred between 27 December 2018 and 10 January 2019. The protestors called for the resignation of parliamentary speaker Miyeegombyn Enkhbold, who was in an unresolved 2016 corruption case and believed to be the head of a cabal between the two dominant parties, the Mongolian People's Party and the Democratic Party.

The mass protests coincited with a major factional infighting within the governing MPP and subsequent political gridlock. In the aftermath of the protests, Enkhbold was dismissed by the State Great Khural (parliament) on 29 January 2019, forcing him to retire from politics. He was succeeded by Gombojavyn Zandanshatar on 1 February 2019.

Anti-corruption initiatives by the government intensified in the following months. A legislation allowing the president to dismiss corrupt judges based on the suggestions of the National Security Council, a non-constitutional body chaired by the president, was passed by parliament in March 2019. Several justices, prosecutors and anticorruption chiefs were dismissed by the president in March and June. Subsequently, the country was plunged into a constitutional crisis. Later that year, in November, the debate came to end with amendments to the Constitution of Mongolia, which empowered the prime minister and judicial independence with reduced presidential oversight powers and terms.

== Background ==
Corruption in Mongolia has been endemic and widely perceived to be worsening, especially in the mining sector with state involvement.

=== 2016 corruption scandal ===
External audio
- 40 minutes of the leaked "₮60 billion scheme" audio
- Full 90 minutes of the leaked audio
- Visualized 2 minute clip version (Warning: loud sudden noises)

In a 2014 leaked audio, Miyeegombyn Enkhbold, chairman of the MPP, was revealed to be conspiring to sell off government positions for around 60 billion MNT to raise funds for the 2016 election campaign. The audio surfaced to the public in 2016 amidst election campaigning. The corruption scandal was dubbed by politicians and media outlet as simply the "₮60 billion case." (Note: Mongolian: 60 тэрбумын хэрэг) In a 2016 corruption case, many government officials, along with loyal policemen and security forces were found guilty of embezzlement and fraud.

The case alongwith negative campaigning in the 2017 presidential election promptly lead to conspiracy theories about a wider organized cabal between both parties to surface. The term, "MANAN" (Note: Mongolian: МАНАН, romanized: MANAN, lit. ''fog' or 'mist''), a wordplay with the abbreviations of the Mongolian People's Party (MPP) and the Democratic Party (DP) meaning "fog", coined by former president Nambaryn Enkhbayar, became prominently used to refer to the coalition and alleged conspiracy between the two parties.

=== MPP factionalism ===
In the 2017 presidential election, the candidate and chairman of the MPP, Miyeegombyn Enkhbold, lost to the opposition candidate, Khaltmaagiin Battulga, of the DP by a 9% vote margin. Enkhbold narrowly progressed to the second round of voting, overtaking third-party candidate, Sainkhüügiin Ganbaatar, by just 0.13%.

In the aftermath of the electoral defeat, the MPP, elected with a parliamentary supermajority in 2016, had a growing factional divide between chairman Enkhbold and deputy prime minister Ukhnaagiin Khürelsükh. The cabinet of prime minister Jargaltulgyn Erdenebat, implicated in a corruption scandal, was voted out (42-31) by MPP-controlled parliament on 7 September 2017. Khürelsükh assumed the premiership following his appointment by parliament on 4 October 2017, and later the party chairmanship from Enkhbold in November 2017.

Series of small-scale demonstrations erupted in mid 2018, with serene anger over the economy, energy, and fuel. Labour strikes and rallies by pensioners, teachers and health workers occurred in July and August and continued strongly throughout the month of October.

=== 2018 SME fund scandal ===
In October 2018, a major corruption scandal revealed several high ranking government officials to be taking massive loans from the state's Small and Medium Enterprise (SME) fund, with an annual 3% interest rate, compared to the average 20% bank interest. With an individual loan of no more than MNT 2 billion (USD 750,000), the total funds embezzled by officials is estimated to be over USD 1 million.

On 24 October 2018, it was proven by news site Ikon.mn that the private companies of four lawmakers (Kh.Bolorchuluun, G.Soltan, transport minister Yangugiin Sodbaatar, and light industry minister Batjargalyn Batzorig) took a preferential loan from the SME fund. It was revealed that the wife of Batzorig, the minister incharge of the fund, exceeded the eligibility criteria and unlawfully obtained an SME loan. Out of the 134 enterprises which took SME loans, 122 of it were found to be affiliated with members of parliament. Consequently, the scandal renewed anti-government sentiment among the public.

On 29 October 2018, civil society group, Mongolian Traders Association, demanded corrupt officials to resign in a public statement. The same day, in an official letter, president Battulga proposed the speaker to dissolve parliament due to its "inability to govern" and "abuse of power". According to Article 22 of the constitution, the State Great Khural can dissolve itself if two-thirds of parliament considers it cannot carry on its duties or if the President in consent with the Chairman of the State Great Khural proposes to do so for the same reason hereinabove.

On 31 October 2018, Minister of Food, Agriculture and Light Industry, Batzorig, announced his resignation and accountability in a press conference. He was relieved from his duties by parliament and became the second cabinet minister to resign on 6 November 2018.

On 7 November 2018, speaker Enkhbold rejected president Battulga's proposal. In a responding letter, he said there is no need to dissolve the State Great Khural, which "has been functioning normally and resolving pressing issues on time."

Further investigation by the Prosecutor General into the matter revealed wider web of embezzlement and fraud involving 14 legislators, 2 cabinet ministers, 1 deputy minister, several party officials, heads of ministries and government agencies, and lastly the sibling of prime minister Khürelsükh.

== Key political developments ==
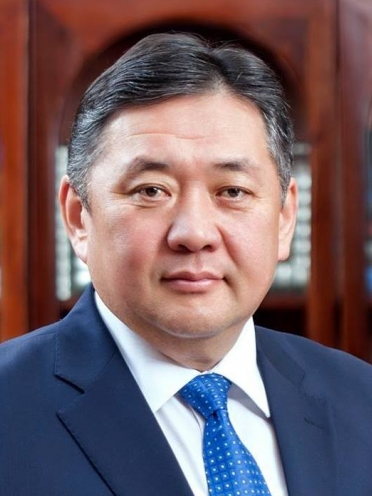
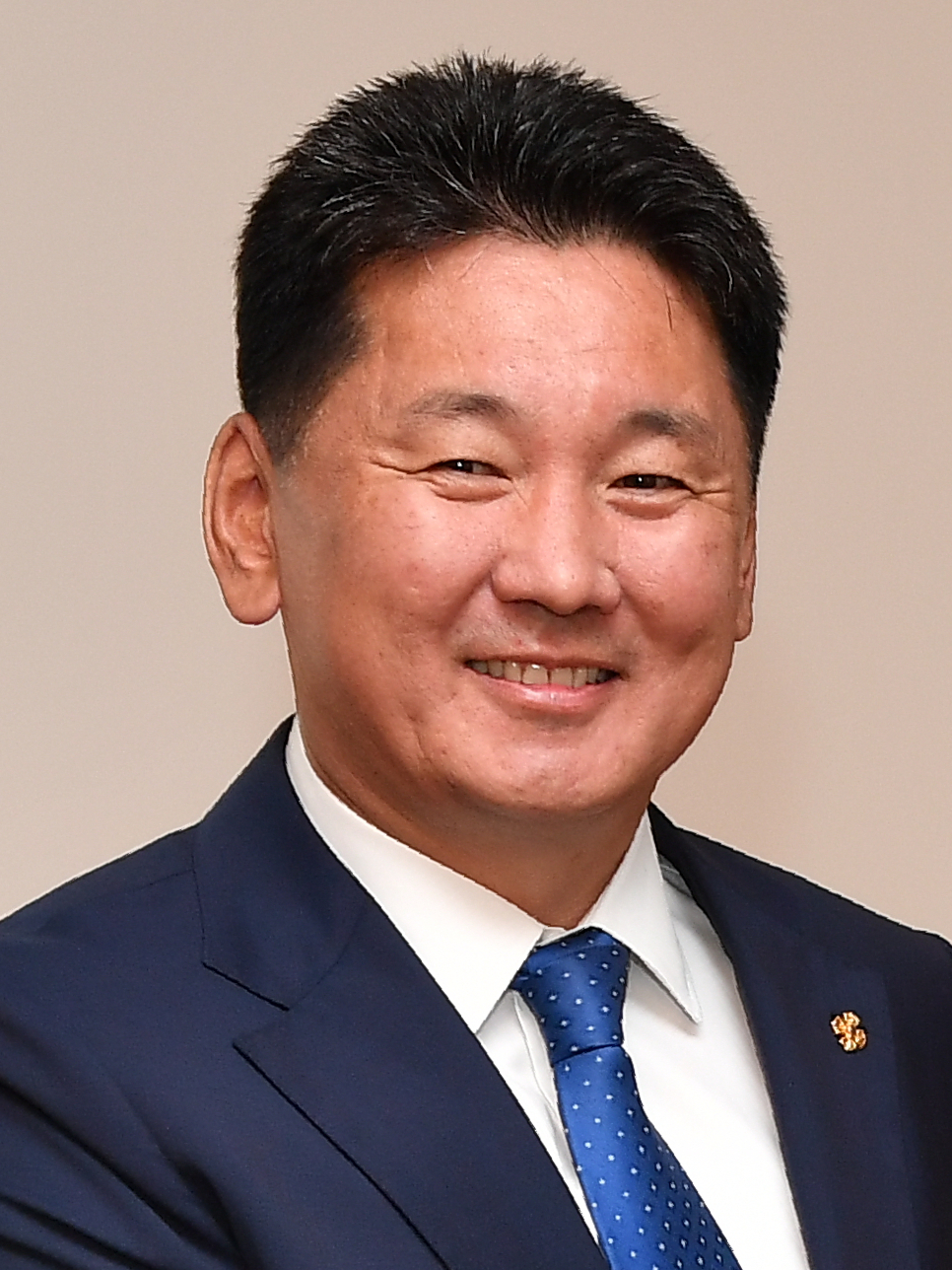
Speaker Miyeegombyn Enkhbold (left) and prime minister Ukhnaagiin Khurelsukh (right)

Anti-corruption protests calling for the dissolution of the State Great Khural were organized in Ulaanbaatar on 11 November. The protestors submitted a formal letter demanding the dissolution to parliament the next day on 12 November. Further protests were organized on 14 November. The corruption scandals consequently divided the 64-seat MPP caucus into two factions—37 allied to Khurelsukh and 27 allied to Enkhbold—which came to be locally known as the "Group of 37" (Note: Mongolian: 37-ийн бүлэг, romanized: Guchin doloogiin buleg, lit. 'Group of 37') and "Group of 27." (Note: Mongolian: 27-ийн бүлэг, romanized: Khorin doloogiin buleg, lit. 'Group of 27')

On 12 November, the governing board of the MPP convened in the prime minister's office. Afterwards, the MPP governing body called for the resignation of speaker Enkhbold, MPP caucus leader D.Khayankhyarvaa, and mayor of Ulaanbaatar Sunduin Batbold. In addition, official dismissal letter of mayor Su.Batbold was submitted to the Ulaanbaatar City Council by prime minister Khurelsukh.

On 19 November 2018, 27 MPP lawmakers, headed by Khayankhyarvaa, submitted a motion of no confidence proposal due to the involvement of cabinet ministers in the SME scandal. In a press statement, PM Khurelsukh stated that "its time to hold accountability" and additionally, recognized the authenticity of the ₮60 billion case footage on 23 November 2018.

With 73 of the total 76 MPs present, a motion of no confidence was held on 30 November. After almost 10 hours of debate, prime minister Khurelsukh survived the motion with 40 legislators voting in favour of him and 33 against him.

In mid November 2018, 40 members of the State Great Khural signed a petition for Enkhbold to hold accountability. The group boycotted parliamentary procedures until his accountability, provoking a political gridlock. Later on 18 December 2018, the legislators held the "Mongolian People's Union against MANAN" (Note: Mongolian: МАНАН дэглэмийн эсрэг монгол түмний нэгдэл, romanized: MANAN deglemiyn esreg mongol tumniy negdel, lit. 'Mongolian People's Union against MANAN regime') public discussion inside the Government Palace with the participation of political parties, movements, NGOs, and civil unions.

== Protests ==
In early December, on the 14th and 20th, civic movements demanding accountability protested against corruption and later for the resignation of speaker Enkhbold.

On 25 December 2018, a month after the petition, lawmakers demanded Enkhbold to resign from his post within 48 hours (by 27 December 2018). If not, the group stated that they will organize a mass protest against MANAN across the country, with the support of over 100 NGOs.

On 27 December 2018, a popular protest by the Mongolian People's Union against MANAN erupted in Ulaanbaatar. In minus 20 degrees Celsius conditions, thousands of protestors, numbering around 25,000 people, gathered at Sükhbaatar Square. The peaceful demonstration, led by five lawmakers, called for the resignation of Enkhbold. The five MPs, Luvsannamsrain Oyun-Erdene (MPP), Khishgeegiin Nyambaatar (MPP), Tömörbaataryn Ayuursaikhan (MPP), Luvsanvandangiin Bold (DP), and Jalbasurengiin Batzandan (DP), came to be known as the "Fair Five" (Шударга тав). Amidst the protests, MP Ayuursaikhan went into the office of the speaker to present their demands. Due to the absence of Enkhbold, the demands were submitted to the Secretary General of the Office of the State Great Khural, Ts.Tsolmon. The organizers noted that if Enkhbold doesn't meet the demands and resign within 72 hours, another mass protest will be held on 10 January 2019.

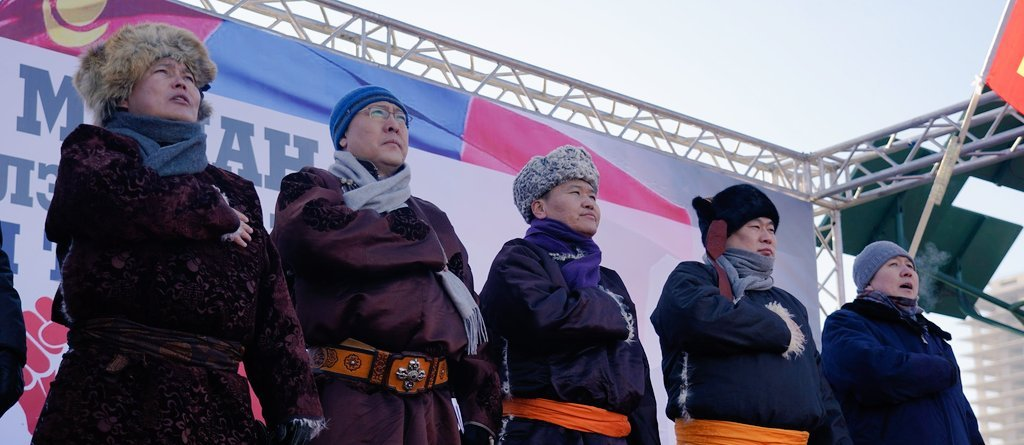
The cross-party group from left to right: Khishgeegiin Nyambaatar, Jalbasurengiin Batzandan, Tömörbaataryn Ayuursaikhan, Luvsannamsrain Oyun-Erdene, and Luvsanvandangiin Bold

After New Year's Eve, on 7 January 2019, the Fair Five announced a nationwide mass protest on 10 January in a press conference. During the press conference, MP Nyambaatar said they will work with the government, law, and police agencies to keep the protest peaceful and safe for all citizens. He later on called on every citzen and civic groups to join to keep government transparent.

The second mass protest occurred at Sükhbaatar Square on 10 January 2019. Similar to the previous one, tens of thousands people were present protesting against corruption, Enkhbold, and cabalism. Demonstrators were allowed into the square after breathalysed and frisked by police. During the protest, MP Oyun-Erdene told the crowd that the protest is estimated to last around an hour and 30 minutes after which a sit-in will be declared. He added that around "250 people are ready to hunger strike" but "hopes such fierce methods wouldn't be necessary if Enkhbold resigns." After the demonstration, the protest organizers met speaker Enkhbold, whom later refused to resign from his post. Consequently, protestors declared a sit-in, building 35 yurts in front of the square. The Civil Will–Green Party, a minor party, and several other civic groups joined the sit-in to collect signatures. Notably, diaspora Mongolians in the United States, Germany, Sweden, Switzerland and Austria also joined the cause, holding minor demonstrations in front of the embassy.

In response, the representatives appealled to meet with the National Security Council (NSC), which consist of the president, prime minister and speaker. The NSC convened the same day at 16:30 and ultimately advised parliament to discuss and decide on the matter within that day. However, the subcommittee on State Structure was unable to convene due to inefficient turnout. At the Government Palace, a signature board for the dissolution of the State Great Khural was put by DP lawmakers in front of the main conference room entrance. Within a day, 10 lawmakers signed the proposal.

== Aftermath ==
"Because the living conditions of citizens aren't easy, I understand the issues that are being discussed and criticized. However, I would like to address the young people who organized the demonstration today.

You have shown that all the bad things that have happened in the past 20 years can be blamed on one person. Perhaps it was necessary to blacken me in order to glorify someone and make them the beloved son of the people and show that they are solving all the problems that exist in today's society. A lot of black paint was sprayed on me. I hope that black paint will fade away in time, with the sun and wind. I hope that the time will come when the people will understand what I have truly done."

— Miyeegombyn Enkhbold, during a parliamentary address after his dismissal, ikon.mn

After a month-long parliamentary deadlock, on 18 January 2019, the draft law for dismissing the speaker, scheduled to take effect on 25 January, was approved by a 89% majority. On 29 January 2019, in the final parliamentary discussion regarding the law, speaker Miyeegombyn Enkhbold was dismissed by a majority vote due to alleged abuse of power. After his dismissal, in a speech, Enkhbold said that it is a "grey day in the history of the Mongolian parliament." He was succeeded by MPP legislator and former foreign minister Gombojavyn Zandanshatar on 1 February 2019.

The democratic reforms movement was dwindling while the 2019 constitutional crisis was taking place. In April and May 2019, a series of votes was held for a constitutional amendment survey.

In the lead up to the 2020 parliamentary election, on 30 May 2019, anti-government protests were organised by the parliamentary minority and opposition DP. The protests targetted prime minister Khurelsukh to resign for the government's failure to tackle corruption, pollution, economic stagnation and public health crisis.

Two DP lawmakers of the Fair Five, Luvsanvandangiin Bold and Jalbasurengiin Batzandan, established the Citizens' Coalition for Justice Party in June 2019. The party formed a big tent electoral coalition, the New Coalition, with several other extra-parliamentary parties prior the 2020 parliamentary election. However, the coalition won no seats and came in fourth place. The MPP under Khurelsukh's chairmanship won another landslide victory with 62 of the 76 seats. Khurelsukh was re-appointed as prime minister and served as until 2021, when he voluntarily resigned following the 2021 COVID-19 protests. He was succeeded by Luvsannamsrain Oyun-Erdene as prime minister in January; and later ran for the presidency, winning 80% of the vote in June 2021.

== See also ==
- Corruption in Mongolia
- 2008 riot in Mongolia
- Mongolian Revolution of 1990
