= 2019 Mongolian constitutional crisis =

Mongolian political crisis

- Part of aftermath of the 2018–2019 Mongolian protests
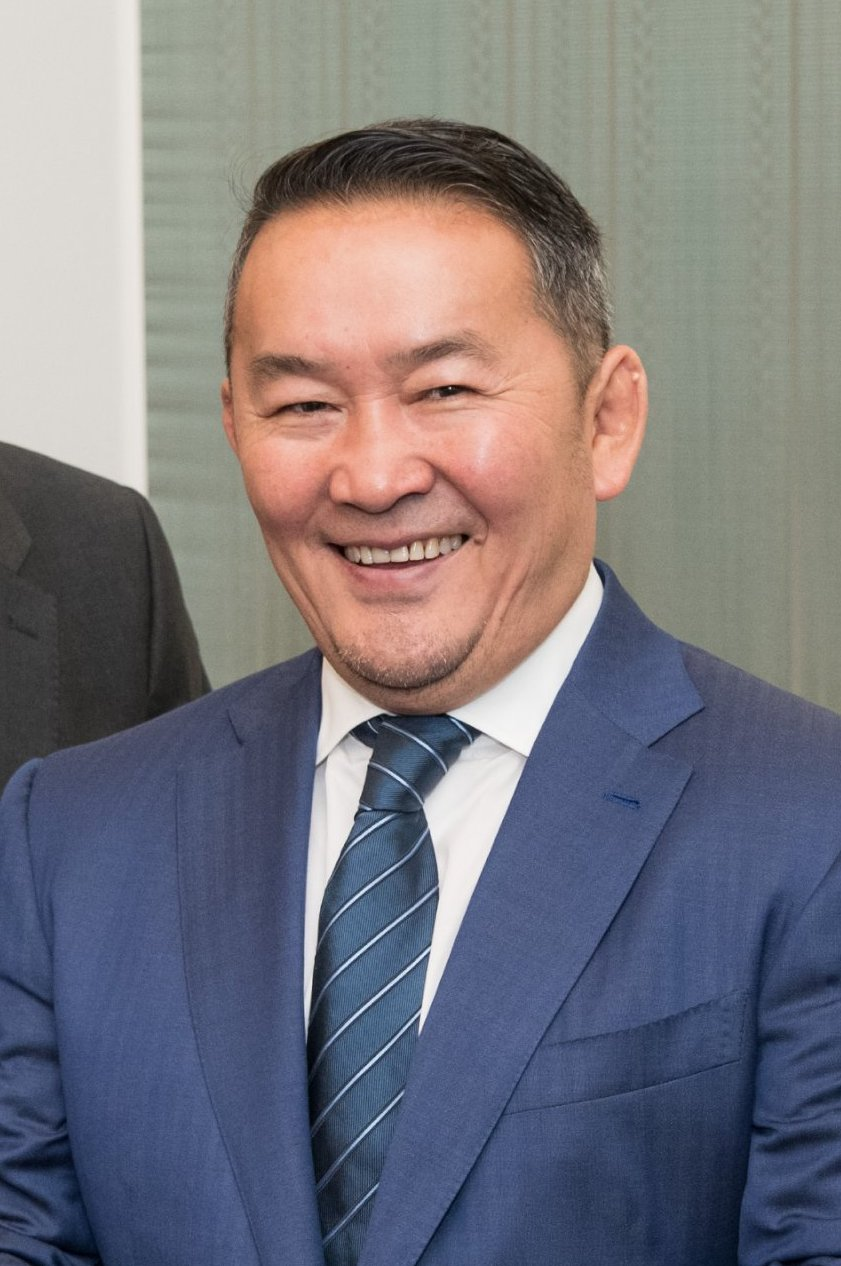
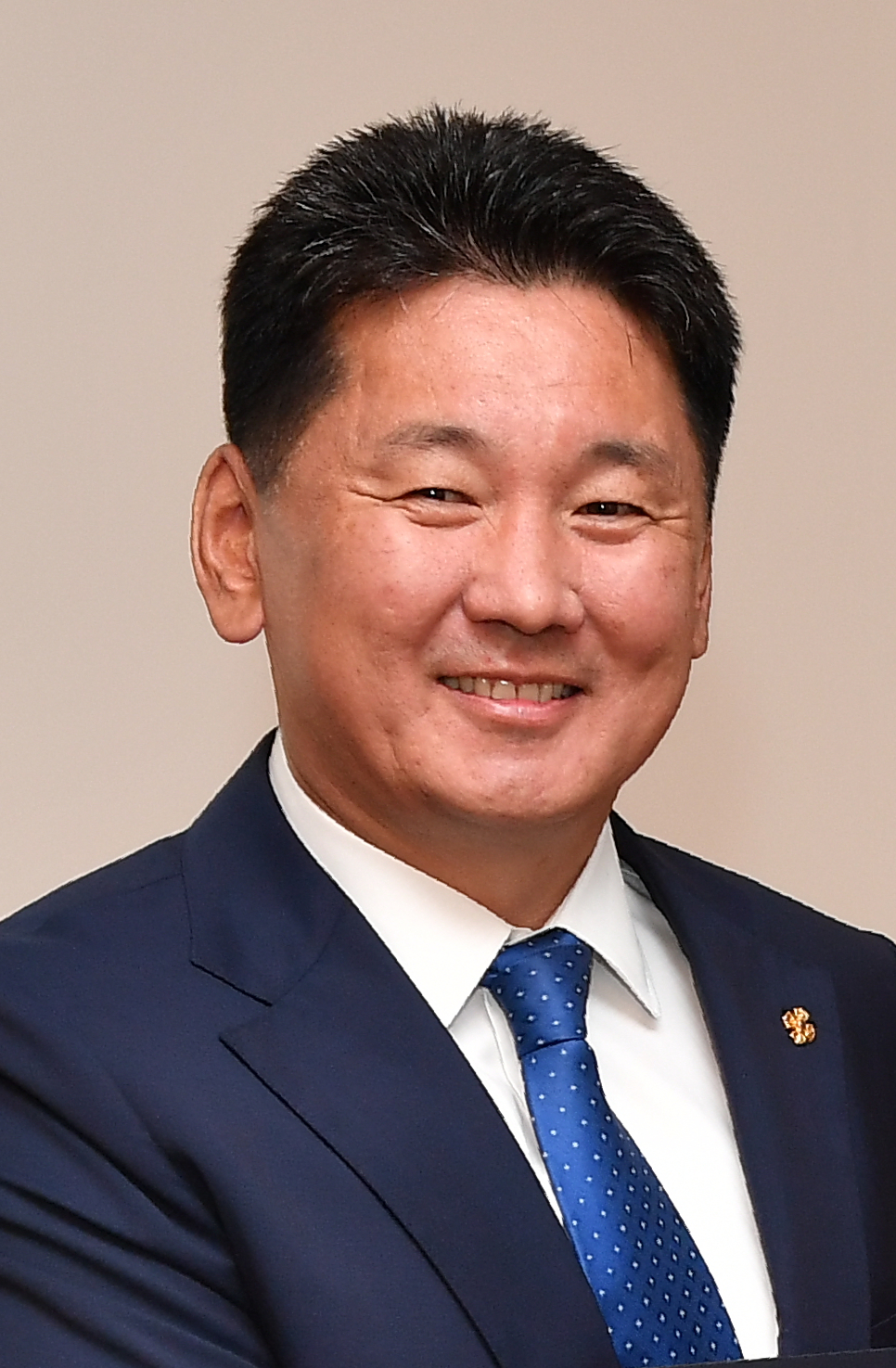
- Khaltmaagiin Battulga (left), Ukhnaagiin Khurelsukh (right)
- Date: 27 March 2019 – 14 November 2019 (33 weeks and 1 day)
- Location: Mongolia
- Caused by: 2018 major corruption scandal and subsequent popular protests; Anti-corruption initiatives by Battulga and Khurelsukh
- Result: Constitutional amendments, strengthening the powers of the Prime Minister, were passed; Presidential term shortened to a single 6-year term

Parties
Political parties: Democratic Party; National Labour Party	President of Mongolia; National Security Council of Mongolia; Political parties: Mongolian People's Party (Khurelsukh supporters)

The 2019 Mongolian constitutional crisis refers to legislation that has been criticized as threatening Mongolia's democracy by undermining its constitutional separation of powers. Though there is no consensus on the exact date the crisis began, many point to 27 March 2019, when the State Great Khural adopted an unprecedented law empowering the National Security Council of Mongolia, a non-constitutional body to the President of Mongolia, to recommend the dismissal of judges, prosecutors, and the head of the Anti-Corruption agency.

== Background ==
The Mongolian People's Party (MPP) won the 2016 parliamentary elections with a supermajority, claiming 65 of the 76 total seats. Effectively securing both the office of the Prime Minister of Mongolia, and the Chairman of the State Great Khural. The next year, in the 2017 presidential election, Khaltmaagiin Battulga, running from the opposition Democratic Party (DP), won the second round with around 55% of the vote. In mid-2018, Speaker Miyeegombyn Enkhbold was alleged to be heading a group conspiring to raise 60 billion MNT (approximately US$23 million) by selling off government positions. This major scandal would kickstart a series of popular anti-corruption and anti-government protests calling for the resignation of various government officials in October 2018.

In November 2018, Prime Minister Ukhnaagiin Khürelsükh survived a vote of no confidence in the wake of another 2018 scandal involving the fraudulent allocation of the Small and Medium Enterprises Development Fund. Speaker Enkhbold was dismissed from his post by the State Great Khural in January 2019 and replaced with MPP lawmaker Gombojavyn Zandanshatar in February 2019. Khürelsükh promised to dissolve the cabalistic MANAN (a play on words between the Mongolian word for fog манан, and the acronyms used by the two political parties involved: the MPP and the DP) as part of a larger initiative to address corruption and restore justice. Khürelsükh received widespread public support for this on social media and from the general public. At this point, the judiciary was widely seen as the only remaining branch of government that posed a threat to Khürelsükh and President Battulga. Prosecutor General M.Enkh-Amgalan was a vocal critic of parliamentarians involved with the SME loan scandal.

== Events ==
Shortly after the public apology in late March 2019 by Minister of Justice Tsendiin Nyamdorj for the torture of suspects indicted for the 1998 murder of Sanjaasürengiin Zorig, the National Security Council of Mongolia (NSC) sent an urgent order dated 25 March 2019, to President Battulga. The NSC included the President, Prime Minister, and Speaker of Parliament.

President Battulga proposed the law to Parliament on 26 March. Despite Battulga being a DP member, the Democratic Party criticized the law as an attempt to seize state authority by force. Many opposition politicians, law professors, lawyers, and former members of parliament protested that the NSC is not a constitutional body and warned of the dangers of putting the judiciary in the hands of the legislative and executive branches, particularly the long-term consequences of depreciating the checks and balances that underlie the 1992 Mongolian constitution. Former President of Mongolia Tsakhiagiin Elbegdorj held a press conference criticizing the law.

On 27 March, the parliament convened to ratify the law, where they first viewed and discussed the classified footage of the torture of Sanjaasürengiin Zorig's alleged murderers before voting. Despite members of the Democratic Party leaving the parliament hall and refusing to vote, the law was ratified by a significant majority. The following day, both the Chief Justice of the Supreme Court, Ts.Zorig, and Prosecutor General of Mongolia, M.Enkh-Amgalan, were dismissed by Presidential order. B.Amgalanbaatar, alleged to be involved with the SME loan scandal, took charge as Acting Prosecutor General.

The torture video was shown to journalists on 29 March 2019, who were then allowed to convey its contents to the general public through written descriptions and drawings.

== Reactions ==
Amnesty International of Mongolia published an announcement on 28 March 2019, stating that the recently ratified law posed a serious threat to the independence of the judiciary branch and increased the risk of further illegal torture.

Prominent lawyers said they would appeal to the Constitutional Court of Mongolia. Foreign language news did not report on the events. Mongolian media reported heavily on the events, and social media platforms were active with discussion. The only English-language article related to the constitutional crisis was posted in The UB Post.

The National Human Rights Commission of Mongolia complained that Parliament had only now taken note of torture despite previously being notified 13 times by the Commission regarding torture.
