= Khaltmaagiin Battulga =

President of Mongolia from 2017 to 2021

- Халтмаагийн Баттулга
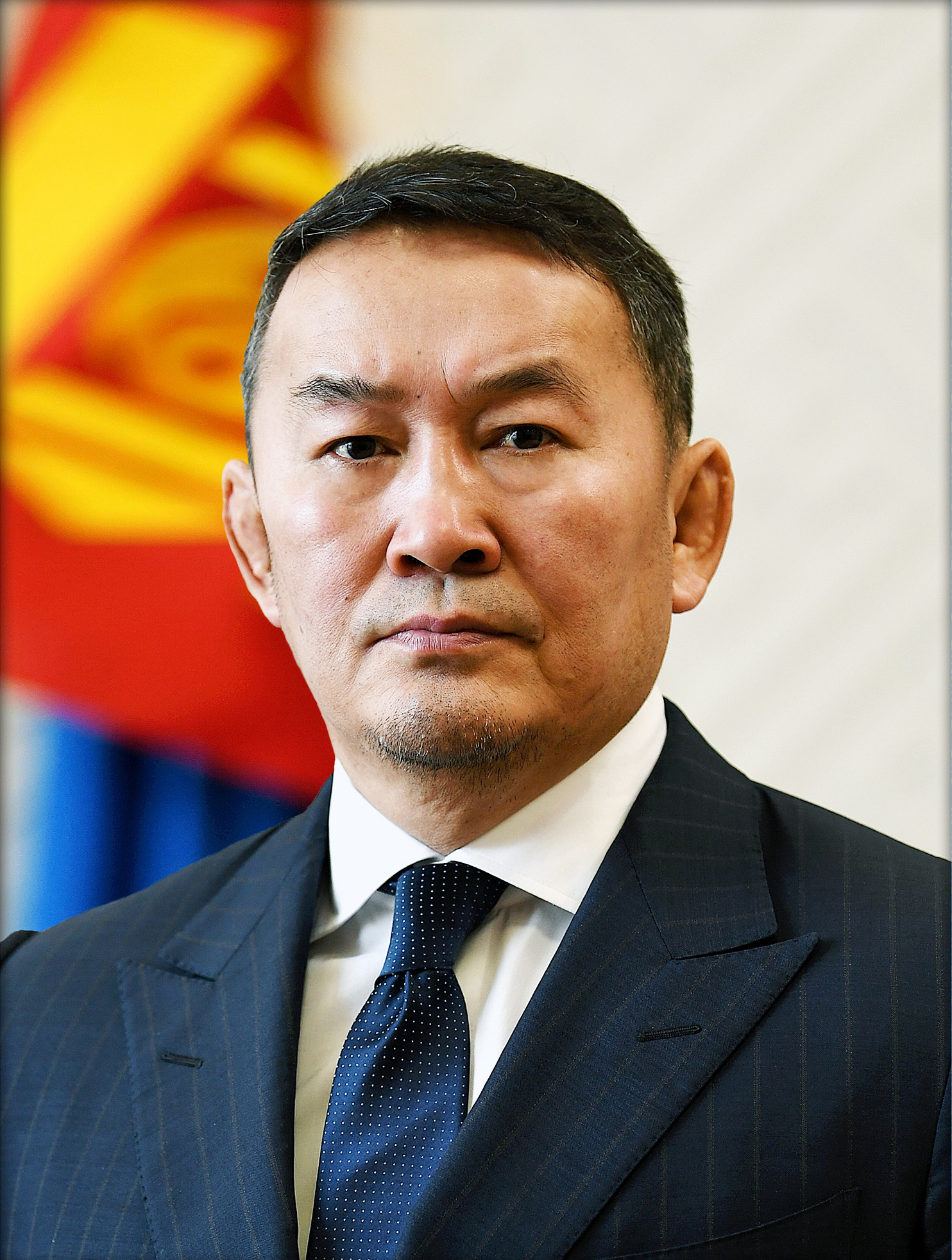
- Official portrait, 2017

President of Mongolia
- In office 10 July 2017 – 25 June 2021
- Prime Minister: Jargaltulgyn Erdenebat; Ukhnaagiin Khürelsükh; Luvsannamsrain Oyun-Erdene
- Preceded by: Tsakhiagiin Elbegdorj
- Succeeded by: Ukhnaagiin Khürelsükh

Member of the State Great Khural
- Incumbent
- Assumed office 2 July 2024
- Constituency: 4th, Bulgan, Khövsgöl, Orkhon Provinces
- In office August 2004 – 5 July 2016
- Constituency: Bayankhongor Province (2012–2016); Bayankhongor Province (2008–2012); Bayankhongor Province (2004–2008)

Minister of Industry and Agriculture
- In office 2012–2014
- Prime Minister: Norovyn Altankhuyag
- Preceded by: Post established
- Succeeded by: Sharavdorjiin Tüvdendorj

Minister of Road, Transport, Construction and Urban development
- In office 2008–2012
- Prime Minister: Sanjiin Bayar; Sükhbaataryn Batbold
- Preceded by: Tserendashiin Tsolmon
- Succeeded by: Tsedeviin Dashdorj

Chairman of Steering committee of the Mongolian Democratic Union
- In office 2006–2017

President of the Mongolian Judo Association
- Incumbent
- Assumed office 2006

Personal details
- Born: 3 March 1963 (age 63) Ulaanbaatar, Mongolia
- Party: Democratic Party (since 2004)
- Education: School of Fine Arts of Mongolia
- Sports career
Medal record
Representing Mongolia
Men's Sambo
World Championships
Gold medal – first place	1983 Kiev	–52 kg
Silver medal – second place	1986 Saint-Jean-de-Luz	–52 kg
Bronze medal – third place	1988 Montreal	–57 kg
Silver medal – second place	1990 Moscow	–57 kg
Friendship Games
Silver medal – second place	1984 Ulaanbaatar	–57 kg
World Cup
Silver medal – second place	1987 Rabat	–52 kg
Silver medal – second place	1988 Tokyo	–52 kg
Gold medal – first place	1989 Ulaanbaatar	–52 kg

Khaltmaagiin Battulga (Mongolian: Халтмаагийн Баттулга [χaɬtʰˈmaːɟiɴ ˈpat̚tʰʊɬq]; born 3 March 1963), also referred to as Battulga Khaltmaa (/ˈbætʊlɡə kæltˈmɑː/), is a Mongolian politician and sambo wrestler who served as the fifth president of Mongolia from 2017 to 2021. A member of the Democratic Party, he served as a member of the State Great Khural (parliament) from 2004 to 2016 and Minister of Roads, Transportation, Construction, and Urban Development from 2008 to 2012.

Before his career in politics, Battulga was a sambo wrestling champion. He was the Democratic Party's candidate in the 2017 presidential election and was elected president with 50.6% in the run-off, the first-ever run-off election in modern Mongolian history. Mongolians are divided about his role in the 2019 Mongolian constitutional crisis. After the constitutional amendments of 2019, which limited the presidential term to a non-renewable six year term, Battulga was barred from running a second term. He was subsequently succeeded by president-elect Ukhnaagiin Khürelsükh in 2021. After leaving office, Battulga was elected as a member of parliament for the fourth time in the 2024 parliamentary election.

== Background ==
Battulga was born on 3 March 1963 in Ulaanbaatar. Battulga is the second child of three children. His father and mother are both from Bayankhongor Province. The family was allocated a traditional ger in the Yarmag district in Ulaanbaatar after they lost everything in the flood of the Tuul River in 1966. In 1978, he graduated from the 10-year 34th secondary school in Ulaanbaatar. In 1982, he graduated from the School of Fine Arts of Mongolia with a degree in painting. While studying at the arts school, Battulga sold his paintings to tourists around the Bayangol Hotel area.

=== Business ===
In 1990, Battulga started sewing and selling jeans locally and in Hungary. He saved $600 to buy a video camera and start an export-import business trading electronics from Singapore to Mongolia, Russia, and Eastern Europe.

Battulga was fascinated with The Godfather and named his first company Genco, the name of the olive oil importing company in the film. Genco acquired controlling interests during the privatization of state-owned assets such as Bayangol Hotel and meat-processing factory Makh-Impex in 1997 and 1999, respectively.

=== Wrestling ===
Battulga grew up practicing Mongolian traditional wrestling, as his father, Khaltmaa, was a coach. He later transitioned to sambo wrestling and represented the Mongolian People's Republic in international competition from 1983 to 1990. He won gold at the 1983 World Championships and 1989 World Cup, along with several other medals at the World Championships, World Cup, and Friendship Games. Battulga was awarded a Merited Sportsman of Mongolia in 1995 and became Chairman of the Mongolian Judo Federation in 2006. Under Battulga's leadership at the Judo Federation, Mongolian judokas became Olympic champions for the first time in history.

== Political activity ==
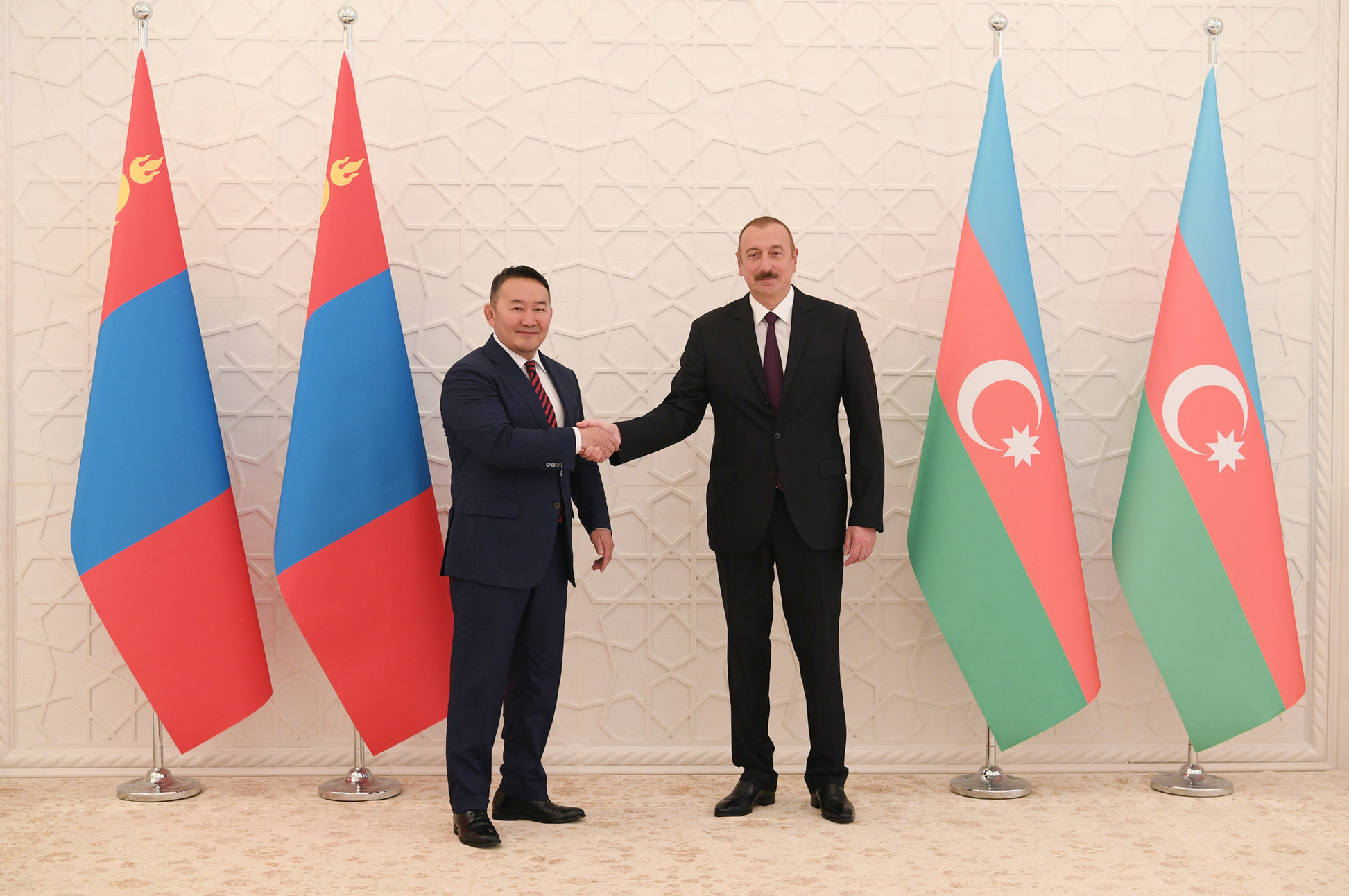
Battulga with Azerbaijani President Ilham Aliyev in Baku.

In 2004, Battulga became a member of the State Great Khural for Bayankhongor province for the first time. He was re-elected to parliament in 2008, 2012, and 2024. From 2008 to 2012, he was the Minister of Roads and Transport of Mongolia. In 2012, he was appointed Minister of Industry and Agriculture of Mongolia, serving until 2014 when Prime Minister Norovyn Altankhuyag resigned.

=== Election ===
Presidential elections were held on 26 June 2017. Incumbent President Tsakhiagiin Elbegdorj was constitutionally barred from running for a third term. Battulga ran in the election representing the Democratic Party. He ran against former Prime Minister and then-Speaker Miyeegombyn Enkhbold of the Mongolian People's Party. For the first time, no candidate received a majority of the vote in the first round, forcing a run-off between Battulga and Enkhbold on 7 July, brought forward from 9 July. In the second round, Battulga was narrowly elected with 50.61% of the popular vote.

The "Mongolia Will Win" (Mongolian: Монгол Ялна), or simply "Moya" (Mongolian: Мояа), grassroots movement emerged from President Battulga's 2017 election slogan, "Mongolia Will Win". The term "Moya" is derived from this slogan, similar to MAGA by Donald Trump in the United States. Moya activists are a diverse, impassioned group bound by a shared sense of Mongolian nationalism and a deep distrust of the political establishment.

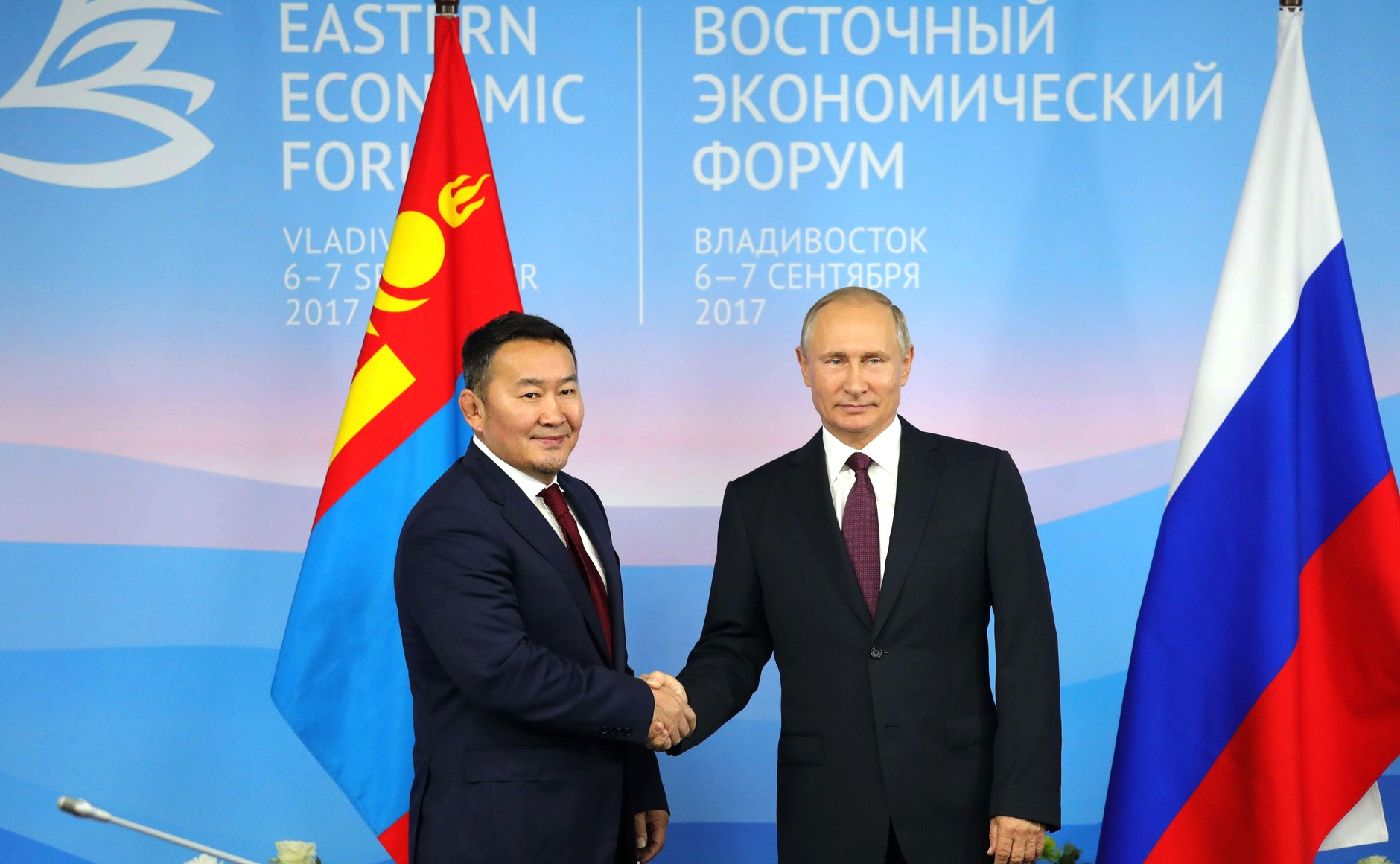
Vladimir Putin and Battulga Khaltmaa in Vladivostok.

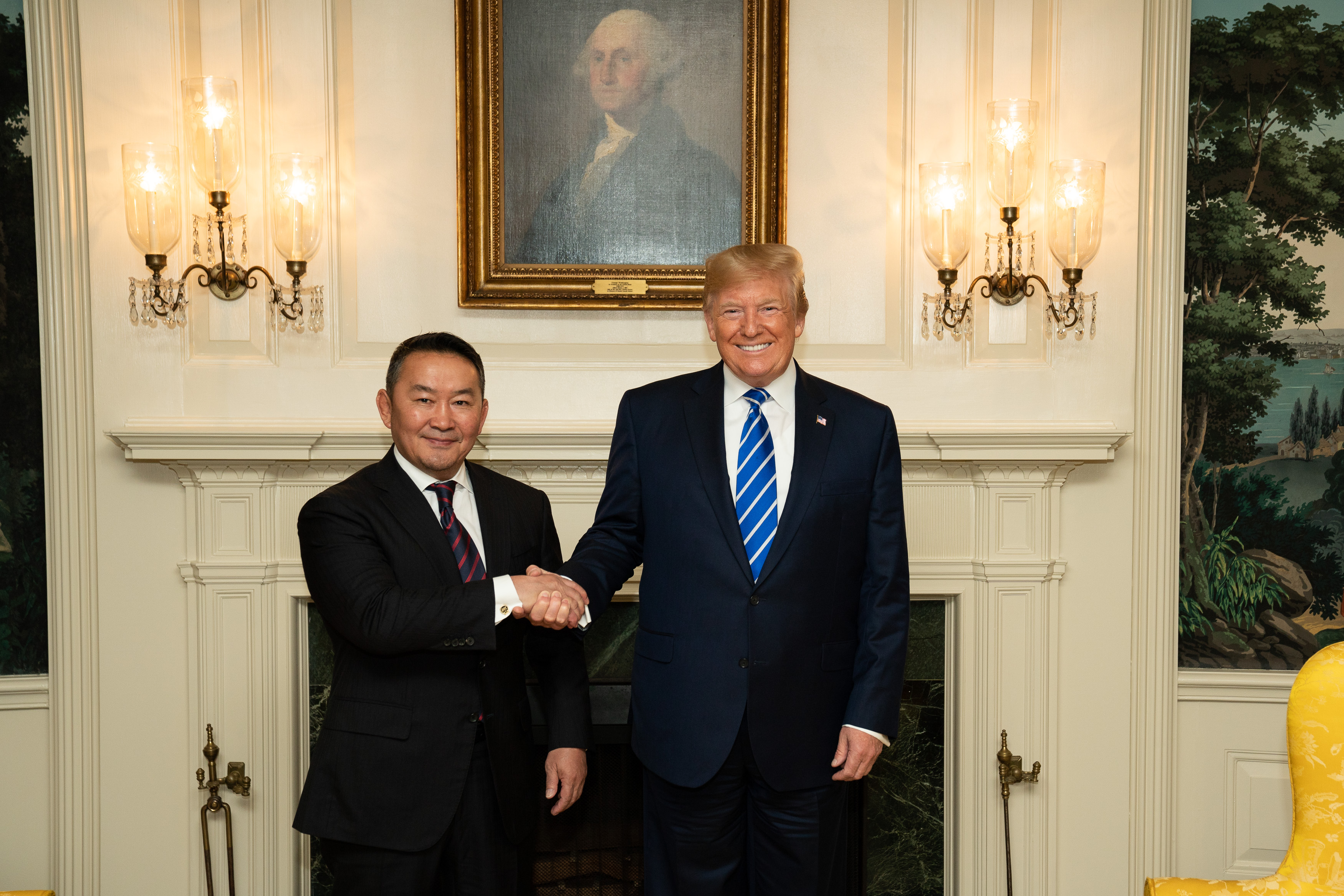
Battulga with U.S. President Donald Trump in Washington, D.C.

== Presidency (2017–2021) ==
=== Inauguration ===
Battulga's inauguration took place at the Government Palace on 10 July 2017 in the presence of Prime Minister Jargaltulgyn Erdenebat and outgoing president Elbegdorj. In his presidential address, he laid out the principles for his term, including one for the industrialization of the country. He also said that he would work to maintain and expand the good-neighbor relations with Russia and China and would "pay utmost attention" to the third neighbor policy, referring to the United States. After the ceremony, he went outside to lay wreaths at the monuments to Damdin Sükhbaatar and Chinggis Khaan. He also received state heraldry, including the State seal of Mongolia and the presidential certificate.

Since he became president, Battulga has made it standard practice for people to put their hand on their heart during the performance of the national anthem of Mongolia by a concert or military band, as well as a vocal performance.

=== Domestic policy ===
==== Death penalty ====
Within days of his inauguration, he took measures to reinstate the death penalty for sexual offenders, which came days after the death penalty was completely abolished in the country. On 16 October, Battulga announced the formation of an expert group to look into the reinstatement of the death penalty for premeditated murder and rape. The following month, he submitted his proposal to the justice and interior ministry. In a speech to the during the opening of the autumn session of the State Great Khural, he claimed that a systemic social crisis is to blame for the national challenges that posed a threat to the country.

The problem lies within the system itself, rather than due to a single individual or political party. Regardless of how good the person or the political party is, they become victims of the irresponsible, poorly coordinated, and unaccountable system, and an adverse condition is set where problems keep piling up and stress levels in the society keep rising.

— Khaltmaagiin Battulga

==== Constitutional crisis ====
On 27 March 2019, the State Great Khural began a constitutional crisis when it adopted an unprecedented law that gave the National Security Council of Mongolia the power to recommend the dismissal of judges and prosecutors, as well as the head of the national anti-corruption service. Battulga's political party, the opposition's main minority faction in the parliament, claims that the law undermines the country's constitutional separation of powers and the larger Mongolian democratic system.

==== Disbandment of the MPP ====
In April 2021, Battulga issued an emergency directive to disband the MPP "in order to safeguard the sovereignty and democracy of the country" after the MPP passed amendments to the constitution. The constitutional amendments, which took effect in May 2020, limits one's presidency to one term, making Battulga ineligible to re-run in the 2021 presidential election. At the same time, he also condemned the formation of a “Mongolian Military Union” as 'a parallel military structure" that "threatens the country's democratic foundations" and "endangers the fundamental rights and interests of our citizens and constitution." Luvsanvandangiin Bold, former Minister of Defense and current Battulga's Advisor on National Security warned that the creation of the union "will lead to the creation of quasi-fascist regime.”

=== Foreign policy ===
==== East Asia ====
Battulga is largely seen as a pro-Russian politician and a Russophile due to his Russian ties and his knowledge of the Russian language. He is commonly compared to Russian President Vladimir Putin due to their shared love and experience in judo. When he spoke to Putin during a summit in eastern Russia in September 2017, Putin said that the shared sport will help "develop a good working and personal relationship".

Battulga has in recent years criticized the Mongolian economy's dependence on China.

On 14 June 2018, after the conclusion of the Singapore Summit between North Korean leader Kim Jong Un and U.S. President Donald Trump, Battulga congratulated both leaders, telling Kim that he considers the summit as a "landmark event not only for the North Korea–United States relations but for the Northeast Asian region and the Korean Peninsula". Battulga was widely expected to host the summit as the Mongolian head of state due to the fact that the country has sponsored many regional summits in recent years and is easily accessible by train from Pyongyang, North Korea. Days after the summit, Battulga invited Kim to Ulaanbaatar for a state visit in honor of the 70th anniversary of diplomatic relations.

==== Others ====
In mid-March 2018, Battulga appealed to U.S. President Trump via telegram to more trade relations, saying an economic downturn threatened to destabilize Mongolia, and that although Mongolia is an "oasis of democracy", this "does not contribute to economic development" in a region where authoritarianism (China and Russia) is on the rise. The United States is one of Mongolia's so-called Third Neighbors, which Battulga said that U.S. trade and investment could help prevent the return of authoritarian in Mongolia. During a visit to Kyrgyzstan in June 2019, Battulga opened the Mongolian Embassy in Bishkek.

==== International trips as president ====
List of foreign visits by Khaltmaagiin Battulga
Date	Country	City	Type of visit/Reason for visit
29 August–1 September 2017	Hungary	Budapest	2017 World Judo Championships
4–7 September 2017	Russia	Vladivostok	Eastern Economic Forum
9–10 June 2018	China	Qingdao	Shanghai Cooperation Organisation
11–13 September 2018	Russia	Vladivostok	Eastern Economic Forum
24 September 2018	Azerbaijan	Baku	Working visit
18–19 October 2018	Belgium	Brussels	12th Asia-Europe Meeting Summit
22–26 October 2018	Switzerland	Geneva	2018 World Investment Forum
24–28 April 2019	China	Beijing	State visit
12–14 June 2019	Kyrgyzstan	Bishkek	State visit
30 July–1 August 2019	United States	Washington, D.C.	State visit
4–5 September 2019	Russia	Vladivostok	Eastern Economic Forum
18–23 September 2019	India	New Delhi	State visit
19 January 2020	Switzerland	Davos	World Economic Forum
27 January 2020	Norway	Oslo	Working visit
27 February 2020	China	Beijing	State visit

== Private life ==
He lives with Angelique Davain, a Russian by nationality and native of the Khentii Province. His legal wife, Ts. Enkhtuya was the director of the Nüüdelchin Company. He is a father to two sets of twin sons and one daughter. Aside from Mongolian, Battulga speaks Russian and English.

John Bolton wrote in his book The Room Where It Happened that Battulga's son served in Afghanistan for a US-led multinational force.

=== Residence ===
In 2017, newly elected Battulga said that he intended to live in the "Winter Palace" in central Ulaanbaatar, also known as the Marshal's Residence, in a break from tradition. The two story-building was originally the residence of Marshal Khorloogiin Choibalsan. It is located between Peace Avenue and Seoul Street (next to the 1st School and the Russian Embassy). Being roughly 400 meters from the State House, he insisted to stay there so that he can walk to work.

=== Social contributions ===
Battulga sponsored the construction of the Chinggis Khaan Equestrian Statue near Ulaanbaatar to celebrate national pride. The statue became one of the main tourist attractions.

Battulga is also President of the Mongolian Judo Association. Under his guidance, Mongolian judoka Tuvshinbayar Naidan became an Olympic judo champion in Beijing 2008. As such, judo has become one of the most popular sports in Mongolia.

Political offices
Preceded by Tsakhiagiin Elbegdorj	President of Mongolia; 2017–2021	Succeeded by Ukhnaagiin Khürelsükh
