= Third neighbor policy =

Foreign relations policy of Mongolia

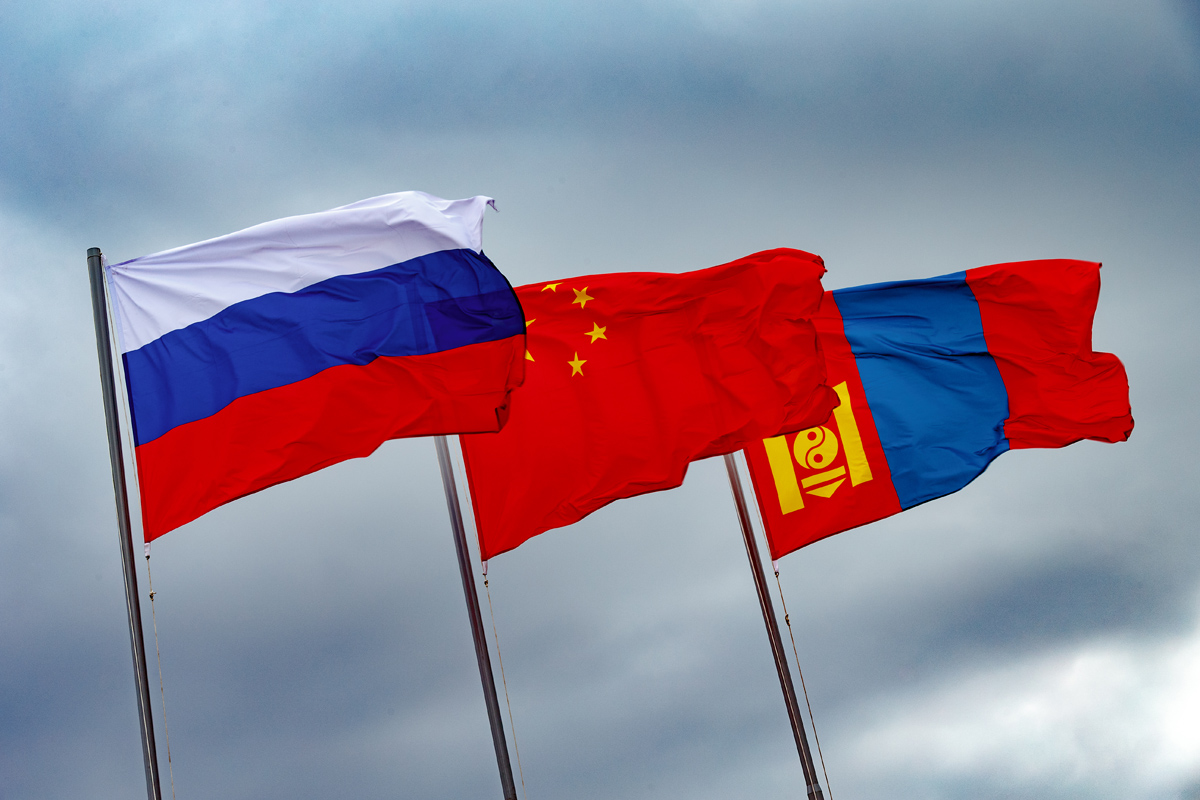
Flag of Mongolia alongside the flags of its two larger neighbours, Russia and China, during the Vostok 2018 military exercise

The Third Neighbor Policy is a facet of foreign relations of Mongolia referring to its building relationships with countries other than the Russian Federation and the People's Republic of China, two superpowers that historically had a sphere of influence extending to the country. The economy of Mongolia is dependent on exploitation of the country's mineral resources, which include copper, gold, uranium and coal, and thus the country is vulnerable to pressure from foreign countries and corporations involved in resource extraction. Countries that have been characterized as "third neighbors" include the United States, Japan, South Korea, France and other developed nations.

By establishing strong bilateral ties beyond its immediate neighbors, Mongolia aims to:

- Expand its partnerships with other countries, reducing economic reliance on China, which is the country's largest trading partner.
- Strengthen diplomatic ties with democratic nations to reinforce Mongolia's modern democratic values and institutions.
- Collaborate on defense with strategic "third neighbors" such as the United States and Japan, enhancing Mongolia's security capabilities in the process.

== Third neighbors of Mongolia ==
Country	Relations	Legal basis
United States	Strategic third neighbor partnership	In July 2019, a joint declaration of a strategic partnership was signed during President Khaltmaagiin Battulga's state visit to the United States of America.
Japan	Special Strategic Partnership for Peace and Prosperity	Joint statement made during President Ukhnaagiin Khürelsükh's state visit to Japan in November 2022. The talks elevated the bilateral ties from a strategic partnership established in 2010 to a 10-year-long "Special Strategic Partnership for Peace and Prosperity".
Germany	Strategic partnership	Joint declaration made during President Frank-Walter Steinmeier's visit to Mongolia in February 2024.
South Korea	Strategic partnership	In September 2021, a declaration was signed during a high-level online summit between President Ukhnaagiin Khürelsükh and President Moon Jae-in. Bilateral relations between the two countries advanced from a comprehensive partnership, declared in 2011, to a strategic partnership.
Kazakhstan	Strategic partnership	Joint declaration made during President Kassym-Jomart Tokayev's visit to Mongolia in October 2024.
Turkey	Strategic partnership	Joint declaration was signed by both presidents during President Ukhnaagiin Khürelsükh's state visit to Turkey in January 2025.
India	Strategic partnership	A joint statement was made during Prime Minister Narendra Modi's state visit to Mongolia in May 2015.
Italy	Strategic partnership	
France	Strategic partnership*	After a state visit by President Emmanuel Macron in May 2023, a cooperation agreement was signed by Mongolian Foreign Minister Batmunkhiin Battsetseg and French Foreign Minister Catherine Colonna in October 2023.
Vietnam	Comprehensive partnership	Joint statement made during President Tô Lâm's state visit to Mongolia in October 2024.
Czech Republic	Comprehensive partnership	
Uzbekistan	Comprehensive partnership	A joint declaration was signed during President Shavkat Mirziyoyev's visit to Mongolia in June 2025.
Kyrgyz Republic	Comprehensive partnership	Joint declaration was made during President Ukhnaagiin Khürelsükh's state visit to the Kyrgyz Republic in July 2025.
Poland	Comprehensive partnership*	
Canada	Expanded partnership	Joint statement made during President Natsagiin Bagabandi's 7-day visit to Canada in October 2004.
Australia	Expanded partnership	According to a statement made by the Australian Foreign Minister Alexander Downer during his 2007 state visit.
Source: Office of the President of Mongolia

== United States ==
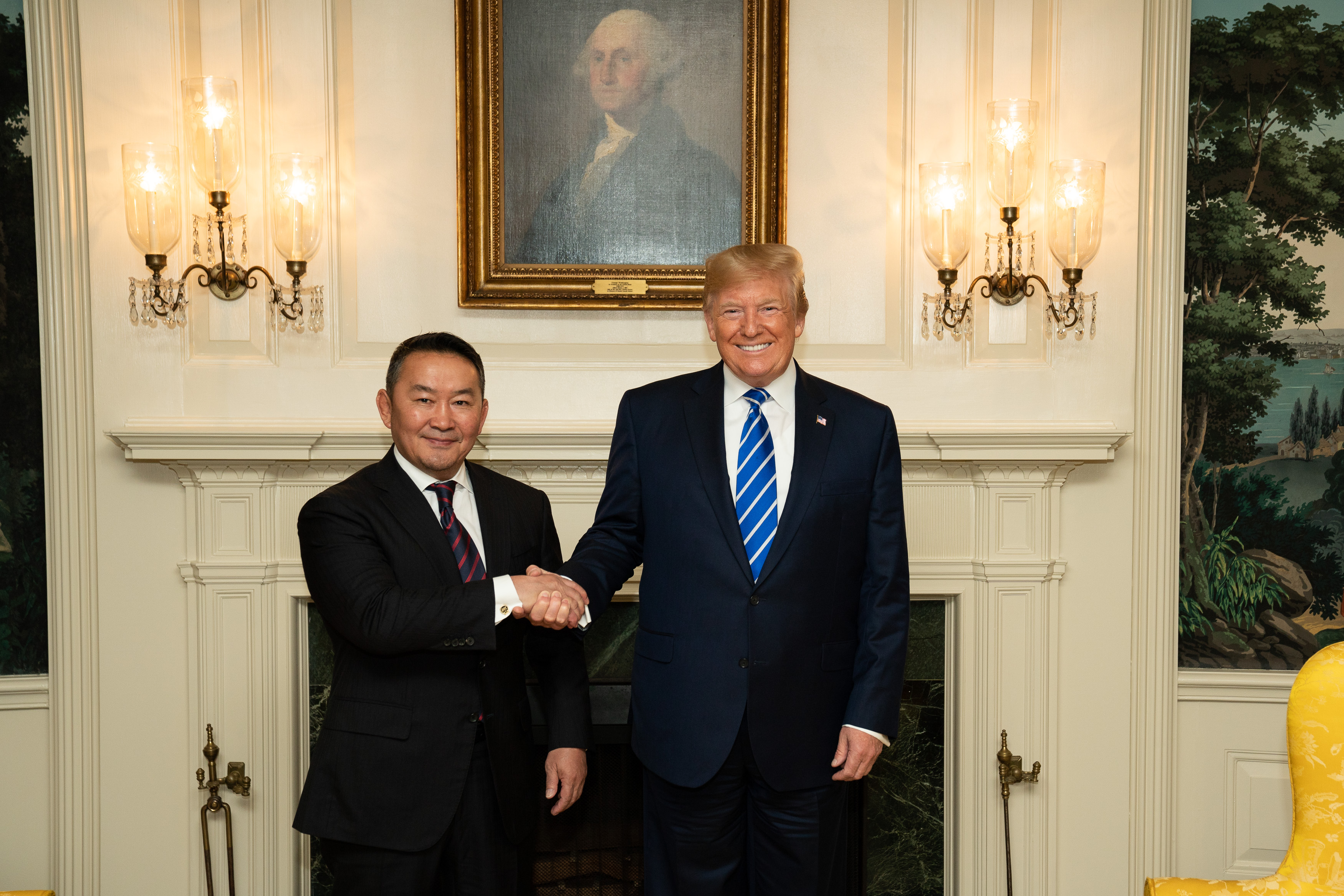
President Khaltmaagiin Battulga with Donald Trump during a 2019 visit to the White House

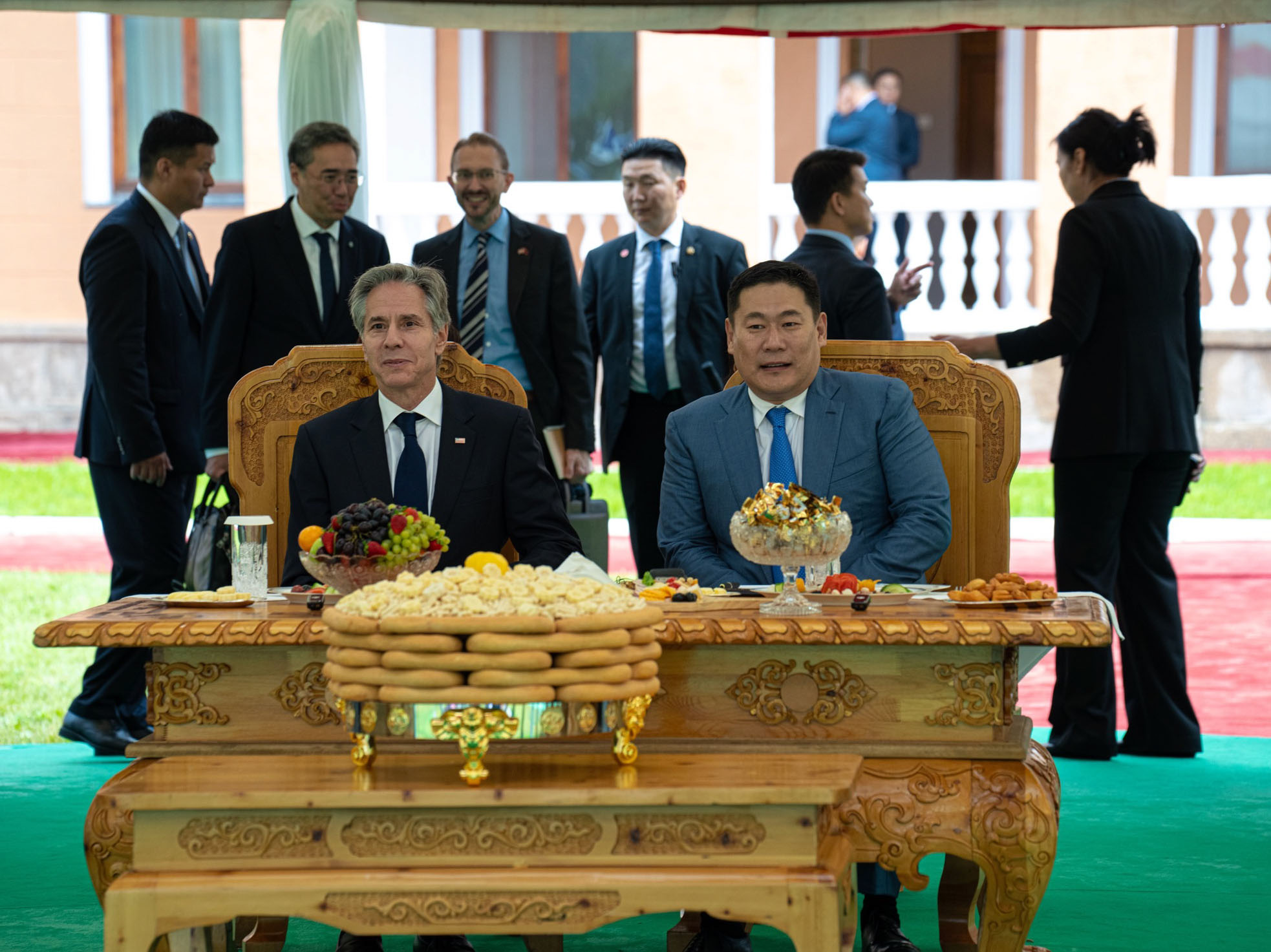
Secretary Antony Blinken with Prime Minister Luvsannamsrain Oyun-Erdene during his 2024 state-visit

In mid-March 2018, Mongolian President Khaltmaagiin Battulga appealed to US President Donald Trump via telegram to more trade relations, saying an economic downturn threatened to destabilize Mongolia, and that although Mongolia is an "oasis of democracy", this "does not contribute to economic development" in a region where authoritarianism (China and Russia) is on the rise. The United States is one of Mongolia's Third Neighbors, which Battulga said that U.S. trade and investment could help prevent the return of authoritarianism in Mongolia.

Another development occurred in 2023. Mongolian Prime Minister Luvsannamsrain Oyun-Erdene visited Washington D.C. on the invitation of US Vice President Kamala Harris in August 2023.

On 30 November 2023, the "Mongolia Third Neighbor Trade Act" was introduced in the U.S. Senate by Senator Dan Sullivan of Alaska. The bipartisan act was simultaneously introduced in the House of Representatives by Vern Buchanan of Florida and Dina Titus of Nevada. If approved, Mongolia’s high-quality cashmere and textiles could be exported to the United States duty-free.

== Japan ==
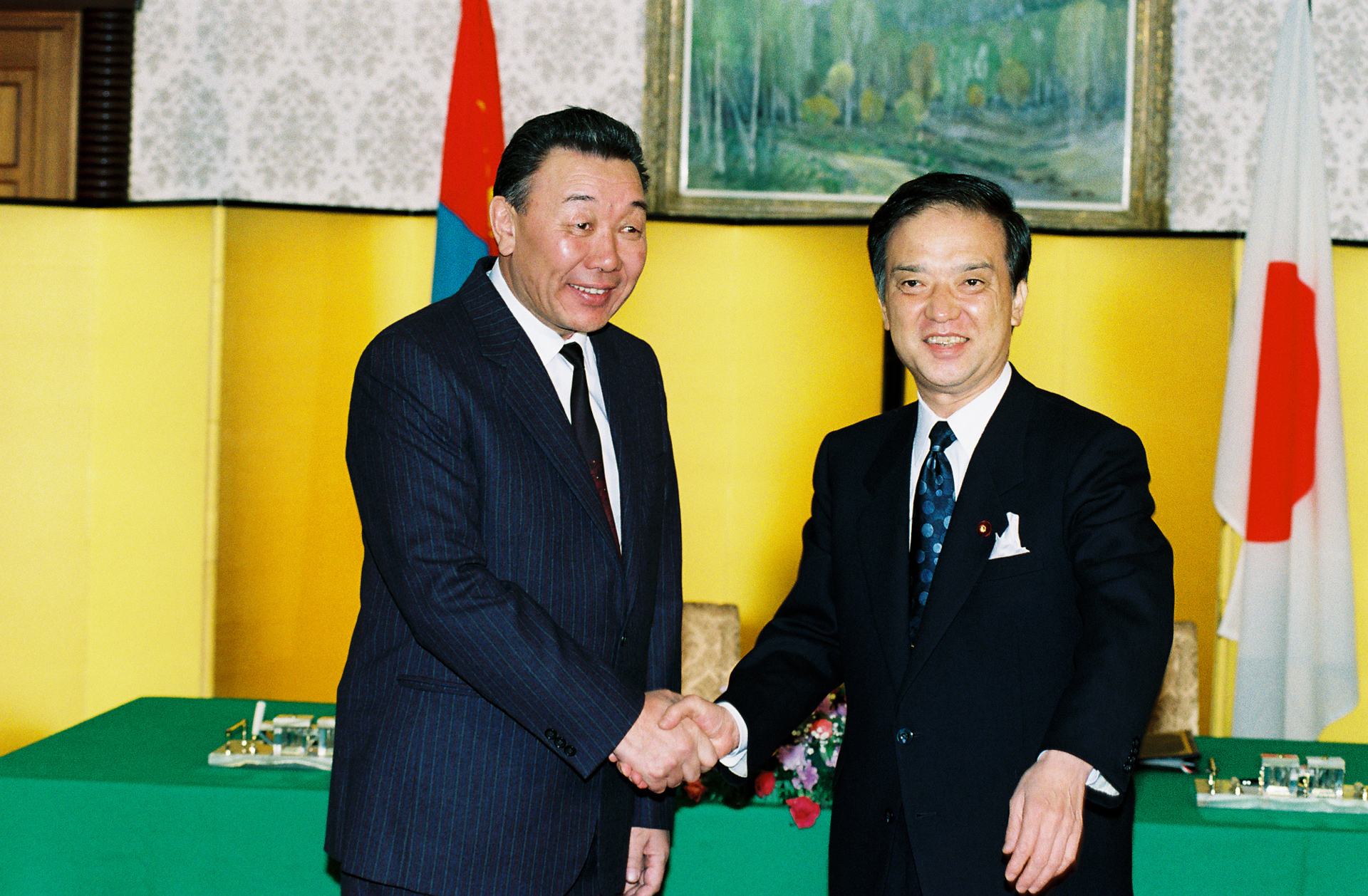
Toshiki Kaifu receiving Dumaagiin Sodnom in Tokyo, 1990; the first high-level exchange between the two countries.

After World War II, diplomatic ties between the Mongolian People's Republic and Japan were established in 1972. By 1988, trade between the two countries was worth US$30 million, equivalent to 43% of all Mongolian trade with capitalist nations.

Since Mongolia's democratization and transition to a market economy in the early 1990s, Japan played an important role in aiding Mongolia via economic and technical assistance. Japan made a series of diplomatic visits to Mongolia starting in 1989. Subsequently in 1990, prime minister Dumaagiin Sodnom made a historic visit to Japan, the first to be done by a Mongolian leader. During his visit, prime minister Sodnom stated that "Japan is our third neighbor." Prime minister Toshiki Kaifu visited Mongolia in 1991, which became the first visits to Mongolia by a non-Eastern Bloc minister and prime minister, respectively. Bilateral ties between the two countries improved drastically since 1972.

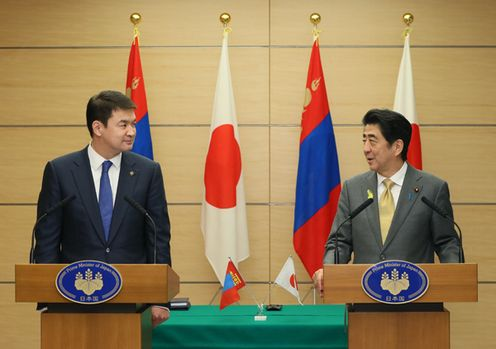
Shinzo Abe and Chimediin Saikhanbileg during a joint press conference after signing a milestone Economic Partnership Agreement in February 2015; Abe made three separate visits to Mongolia between 2013 and 2016.

In November 2022, Japan and Mongolia upgraded their bilateral relationship from "Comprehensive Partnership" (1996) through "Strategic Partnership" (2010) to a "Special Strategic Partnership for Peace and Prosperity" to strengthen cooperation and collaboration under the vision of a "Free and Open Indo-Pacific."

On 6-13 July 2025, Emperor Naruhito and Empress Masako of Japan paid a state visit to Mongolia at the invitation of President Ukhnaagiin Khürelsükh. The visit marked the first official visit to Mongolia by a reigning Japanese imperial couple. Naruhito previously visited Mongolia in 2007 as Crown Prince of Japan.

== France ==
On May 21, 2023, Emmanuel Macron visited Mongolia, the first ever visit to Mongolia by a French President.

As of 2019, bilateral trade between France and Mongolia remains limited. In 2017, bilateral trade stood at €26.1 million (€21.8 million of exports from France to Mongolia, against €4.3 million of import from Mongolia to France).

== See also ==
- Mongolia–Russia relations
- China–Mongolia relations
