= Mongolia–Turkey relations =

- Mongolia: Turkey

Diplomatic mission
- Embassy of Mongolia, Ankara: Embassy of Turkey, Ulaanbaatar

Mongolia-Turkey relations are the bilateral relations between Mongolia and the Republic of Türkiye. Mongolia has an embassy in Ankara and Turkey operates an embassy in Ulaanbaatar.

== History ==
The Mongols and Turks have developed a strong relationship. Both peoples were commonly nomadic peoples despite ethnic differences, and the cultural sprachbund evolved into a mixture of alliance and conflicts. The Hunnic Xiongnu people were thought to be the ancestors of modern Mongols and Turks. Both Turks and Mongols view themselves nomadic warriors, and, for a long time, developed a history of fostering alliance against various Chinese Empires in its attempts to preserve its culture and border.

The two peoples also shared a common Turco-Mongol tradition, which gradually developed into the common sense of reverence to Tengrism, with a strong pride based on freedom and honors. The belief managed to survive even when the Mongols and Turks adopted other religions, Buddhism and Islam, respectively.

When Genghis Khan established the Mongol Empire, the Turks were split between alliance and hostility. A number of Turkic tribes allied with the Mongol Empire, owing to cultural commonalities; while a number of Turkic tribes rose up and fought against the Mongol rulers (such as Jalal al-Din Mangburni), continuing the nomadic traditions. This had continued with various Turco-Mongol governments like Golden Horde, Timurid Empire, the Mughal Empire until the rise of Ottoman Empire, in yet another product of a Turco-Mongol dynasty.

Today, many Turkic peoples continue to share nearly identical cultural customs with their Mongolic counterparts, a result traced from history. According to V. Gordlevsky, and retrieved by Russian Turkologist and Mongologist Aleksandr Kadyrbaev, "In order to understand the history of Turkic peoples it is necessary to study the Mongols".

== Modern relations ==
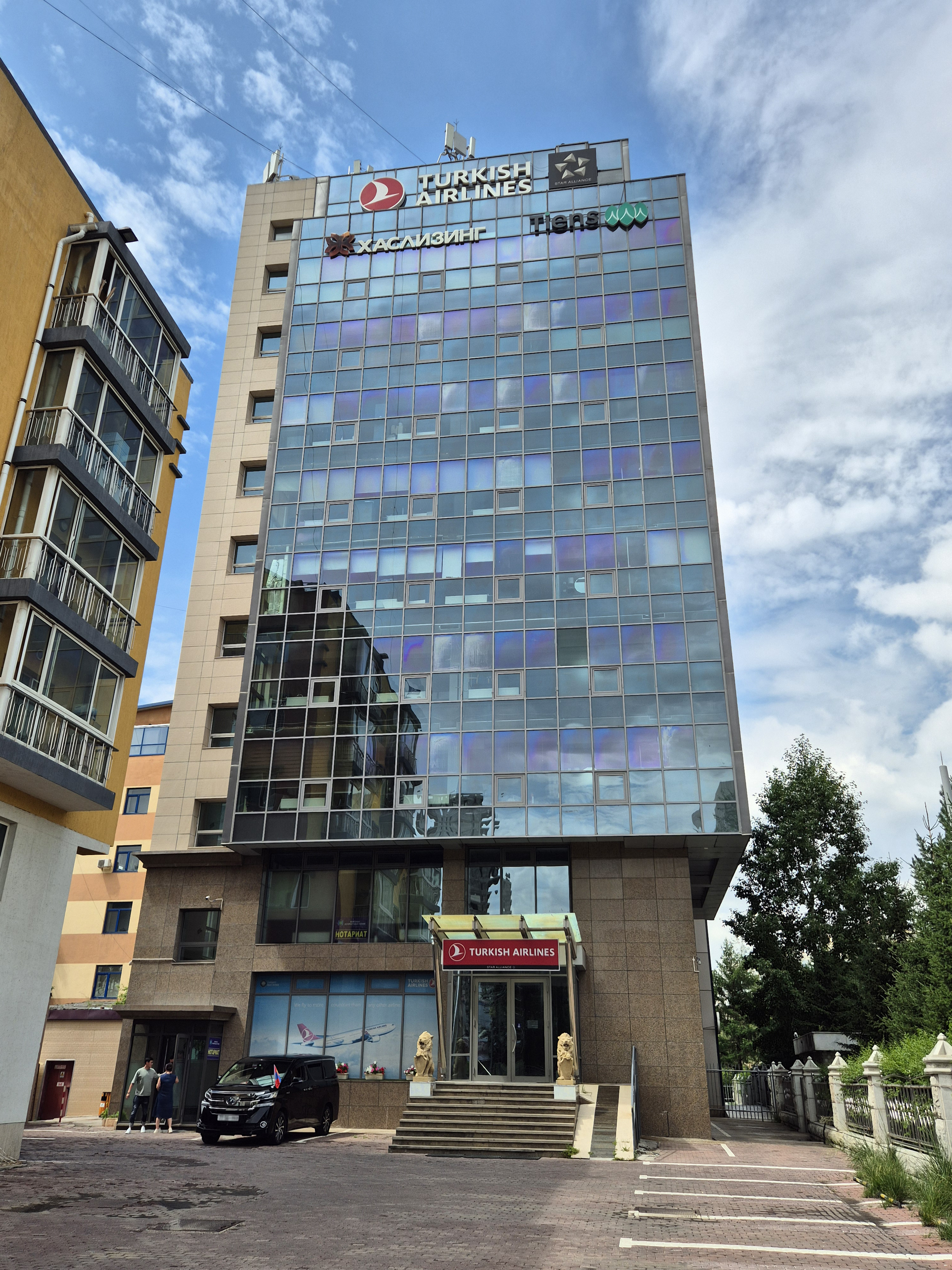
Turkish Airlines office in Ulaanbaatar, Mongolia

Turkey and Mongolia established relations in 1969 when Mongolia was a communist state. The friendly relationship between two countries was reflected in a ceremony back in 2019, when Turkish ambassador to Mongolia Ahmet Yazal declared "We have historical, cultural and social relations that date back to 2000 years ago. We can do many things to ensure that this friendship will take us further", adding that Turkey will always be a Third Neighbor of Mongolia.

Also, Turkey and Mongolia have deepened their cooperation, ranged from education to economic assistance, as well as historical commitment to understand the ancient relations of the two nations.
