= Mongolian National University of Arts and Culture =

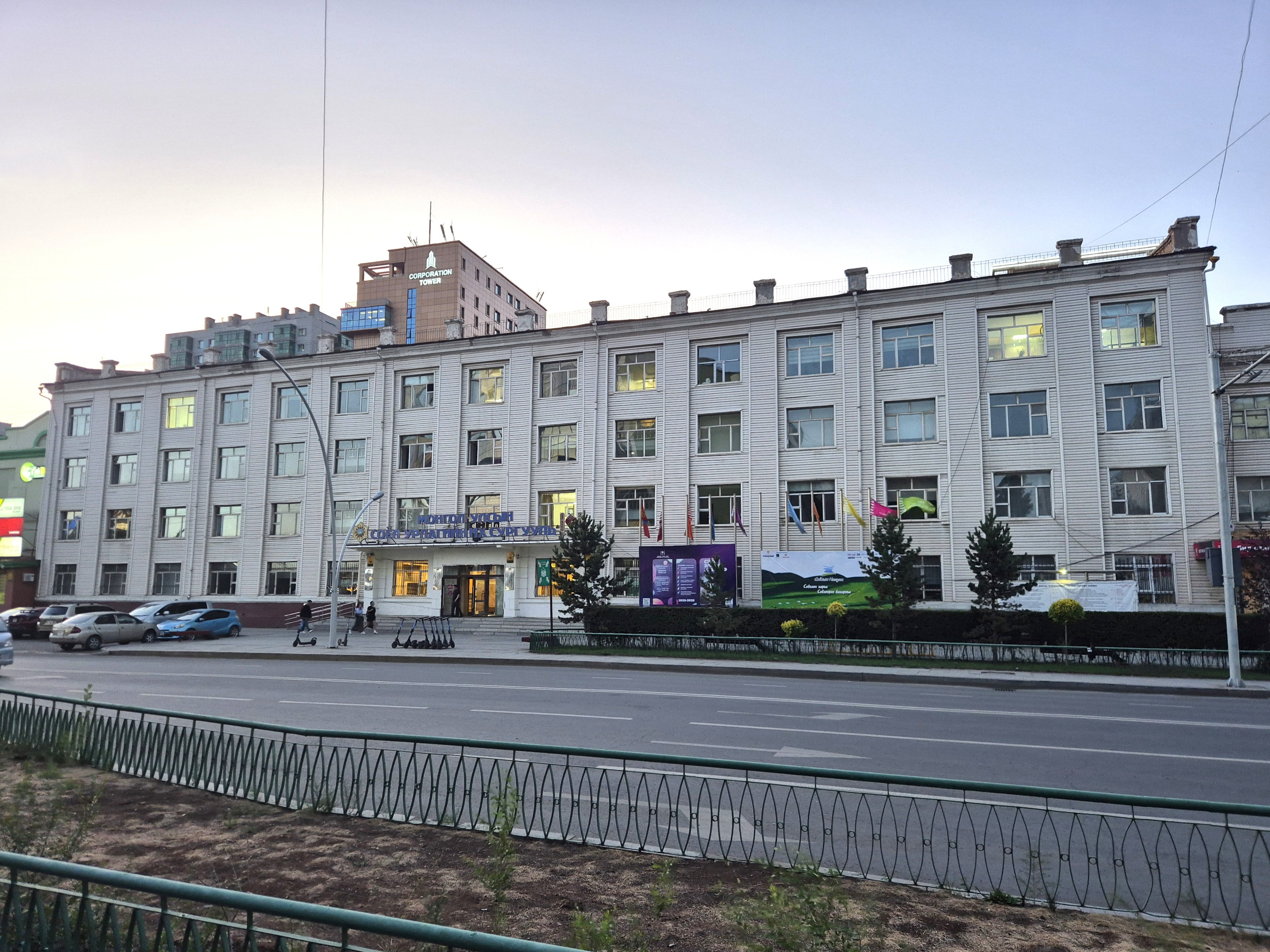
The building in 2025.

The Mongolian National University of Arts and Culture (MNUAC) (Mongolian: Монгол Улсын Соёл Урлагийн Их Сургууль) a Mongolian university based in Ulaanbaatar specializing in the field of the arts and culture, accredited by the Mongolian National Council for Education Accreditation.

== History ==
It was originally founded on 1 June 1945 by the Council of People's Ministers and the Central Committee of the Mongolian People's Revolutionary Party. In 1949, the specialized secondary schools under the Arts Affairs Committee were merged and expanded into the Theater and Music School, which began training professional artists. In 1951, a singing class was opened at the Music and Dance High School. The National University of Arts and Sciences began training theater directors in 1957, film and drama actors in 1959, singers in 1967, and folk musicians in 1989. The Higher School of Culture and Arts was established independently by the Council of Ministers of the Mongolian People's Republic on June 8, 1990. On February 18, 1992, by joint order of the Minister of Education of Mongolia, the Minister of National Development, and the Chairman of the Culture and Arts Development Committee under the Government, the Higher School of Culture and Arts and the Research Institute of Culture and Arts of the Culture and Arts Development Committee were merged and reorganized into the National University of Arts.

On January 6, 2003, by order of the Minister of Science, Culture and Education Ayurzanyn Tsanjid, the affiliation of the School of Design and Art was changed and it was placed under the “Construction and Architecture” Corporation. In May 2005, the College of Culture was reorganized into the School of Culture.

== Organization ==
The university has six subsidiary schools:

- School of Music Arts
- School of Theatre Arts
- School of Fine Arts and Design
- School of Broadcasting and Media Arts
- School of Culture
- School of Dance Arts

The university oversees the following supporting institutions:

- Music and Dance College, Zavkhan Province
- Foreign Language Institute
- Culture and Art Research Institute
- Badmaarag High School
- 3 centres
- 25 academic departments
- 6 administrative departments
- Student Theatre
- Library
- Student Development Centre
- Information Centre
- Harztai Eco-Camp
- Voice recording studio

== Alumni ==
- Khaltmaagiin Battulga, President of Mongolia from 2017 to 2021

== See also ==
- List of universities in Mongolia
