= Dondogdorjiin Erdenebat =

Mongolian politician (born 1959)

Dondogdorjyn Erdenebat Дондогдоржийн Эрдэнэбат

Secretary General of the Democratic Party of Mongolia
- In office 2009–2012
- Preceded by: Dambiin Dorligjav
- Succeeded by: Tsagaany Oyundari

Personal details
- Born: 26 October 1959 (age 66) Selenge, Mongolian People's Republic
- Party: Democratic Party of Mongolia
- Education: Irkutsk State University
- Profession: Entrepreneur

Dondogdorjyn Erdenebat (Mongolian: Дондогдоржийн Эрдэнэбат; born 26 October 1959) is a Mongolian politician, who was the Governor of Baganuur district of Ulaanbaatar. He served as Secretary General for Democratic Party of Mongolia. Currently he is a State Great Khural member.

== Early life and education ==
He was born in Zuunkharaa, Selenge province of Mongolia in 1959. He studied at 1st secondary school in Zuunkharaa between 1967 and 1977. After graduating from secondary school, he went to Irkutsk, Russia for higher education. There, he studied at Engineering Department of Irkutsk State University.

== Career in politics ==
Between 1996 and 2000, he was member of Representatives for Ulaanbaatar. Meanwhile, he was also leading member of Representatives for Baganuur district. In 1998, he was elected as vice-president of Mongolian Volleyball Association in 1998.

Since 2000, he has been member of National Consultative Committee and executive committee of Democratic Party of Mongolia. Between 1998 and 2006, he was chairman of Baganuur provincial party association of Democratic Party of Mongolia.

== Secretary General of Democratic Party of Mongolia ==
Since 2009, he served as Secretary General for Democratic Party of Mongolia. He led 2012 election campaign of his party as Secretary General and Democratic Party won that election. He elected for State Great Khural member.
