= NEW Party (Mongolia) =

Political party in Mongolia

NEW Party ШИНЭ Нам
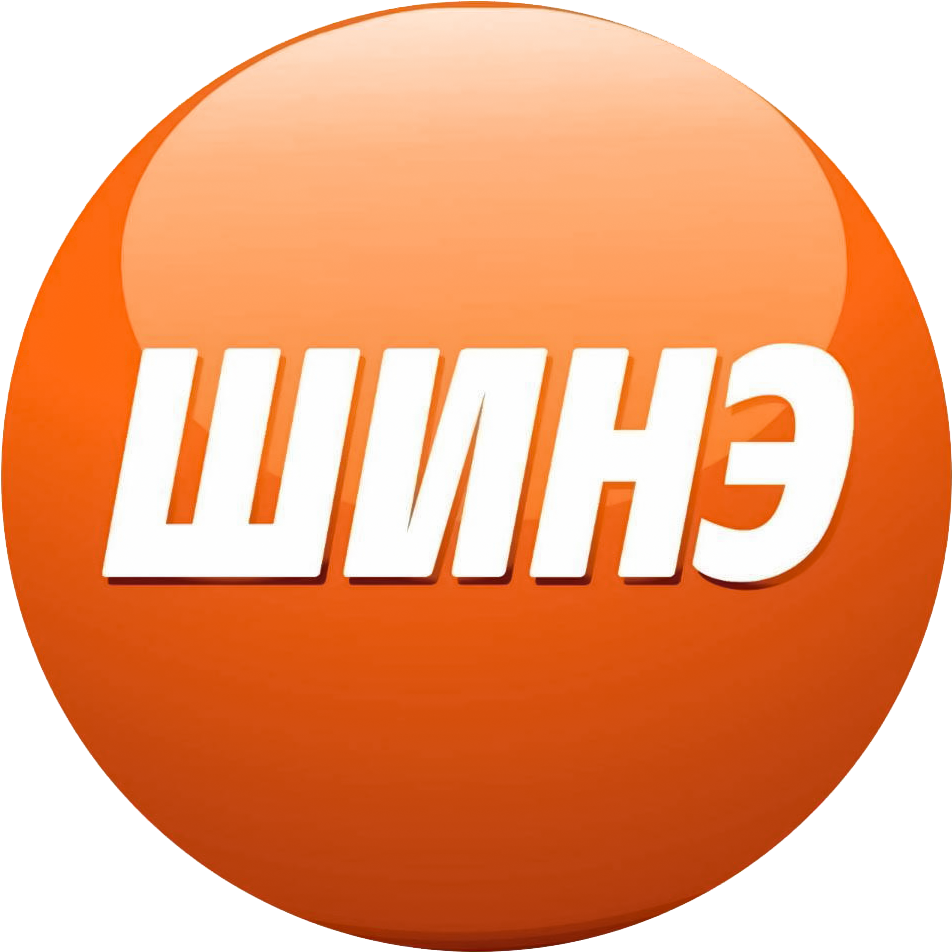
- Abbreviation: NP (English); ШН (Mongolian)
- Chairman: Tsendsürengiin Gantulga
- Founder: Jalbasürengiin Batzandan; Luvsanvandangiin Bold
- Founded: 6 June 2019
- Registered: 12 September 2019
- Dissolved: 22 June 2026
- Headquarters: Ulaanbaatar
- Ideology: Big tent Populism; Civic nationalism
- Political position: Centre-right
- National affiliation: New Coalition (2020); New United Coalition (2024)
- Colors: Orange
- Politics of Mongolia; Political parties; Elections; Formerly: Citizens’ Coalition for Justice Party; Шударга Иргэдийн Нэгдсэн Эвсэл Нам (2019–2024)

NEW Party (Mongolian: ШИНЭ Нам, romanized: SHINE Nam, abbr. ШН), formerly the Citizens' Coalition for Justice Party (Mongolian: Шударга Иргэдийн Нэгдсэн Эвсэл Нам, romanized: Shudarga Irgediin Negdsen Evsel Nam, abbr. ШИНЭН) was a political party in Mongolia between 2019 and 2026. The party was founded on 6 June 2019, in the aftermath of the 2018 anti-government protests, and was officially registered by the Supreme Court in September. However, after unsuccessfully running in two parliamentary elections, the party became defunct in June 2026 when it was deregistered for not following up with relevant laws.

The NEW Party emerged as a big-tent political organization, comprising many social movements, non-governmental organizations, and opposition forces against the political establishment dominated by the Mongolian People's Party (MPP) and Democratic Party (DP).

== History ==
In 2004, a group of young activists organized demonstrations against government policies. The movement led to the creation of the "Healthy Society, Civil Movement", a non-governmental organization, and later the Civil Movement Party led by Jalbasürengiin Batzandan in 2007.

During the 2018–2019 Mongolian protests against an alleged corruption scandal by high-ranking government officials, anti-government sentiment soared, and the two major parties, the MPP and the DP, were accused of working together. Five cross-party members of parliament, informally known as the "Fair Five", took part in the popular demonstrations and called for the resignation of Chairman of the State Great Khural Miyeegombyn Enkhbold, who resigned in February 2019.

On 6 June 2019, the Citizens' Coalition for Justice Party was founded by then-lawmakers Jalbasürengiin Batzandan and Luvsanvandangiin Bold, both of whom were part of the Fair Five and members of the Democratic Party.

In the 2020 parliamentary election, the party formed the New Coalition, an electoral coalition with the Republican Party, Truth and Right Party, and Mongolian National Democratic Party, all minor extra-parliamentary parties. The coalition comprised 11 political parties and 109 non-governmental organizations but failed to win any seats in the State Great Khural, winning 5.35% of the vote.

Following their defeat, the party adopted the "New Revolution" as its party manifesto and replaced founder and chairman Batzandan with Tsendsürengiin Gantulga. Ahead of the 2024 parliamentary election, the party changed its name to the NEW Party in January 2024 and formed an electoral coalition with the Mongolian Traditional United Party, called the New United Coalition. The coalition didn't secure any seats in the expanded State Great Khural and won 4.79% of the vote in the 2024 election.

On 22 June 2026, the party was deregistered as a legal political party by the Supreme Court for not following up with relevant laws.

== Ideology ==
The NEW Party was a big-tent, catch-all party that leans socially to the right while adopting left-leaning economic policies. It positioned itself as a popular third-party alternative for Mongolia, with a focus on tackling corruption and the MPP-DP political establishment. The party was largely seen by the public as a populist party, as Batzandan, party founder, was a prominent populist figure in Mongolia.

The party manifesto, "New Revolution" was made up of 18 key ideas, called the 18 revolutions. Out of the 18 revolutions, 9 were focused on economic reforms and the other 9 on political reforms. The 5 major "revolutions" proposed by the party were: the Revolution of Justice, the Revolution of Wealth Equality, the Revolution of Industry, the Revolution of Technology, the Revolution of Economy and Finance.

According to then-party chairman Gantulga, Mongolia's decline stemmed from the 1992 Constitution, which enabled a de facto two-party system, inefficient governance, political corruption, and environmental decline to take root. He stated that "parties without any proper ideology, philosophy, manifesto or principle lead to authoritarianism" and "all of Mongolia's 36 political parties having no manifesto, despite the fall of communism, is a tragedy". The party promoted the idea of drafting a new constitution, named the Ikh Zasag, to implement a strong constitutionalist framework and rename the country to "State of Great Mongolia", referencing Mongolia's historic past.

Party officials compared Mongolia's current state to an old UAZ-469 racing against a Japanese Land Cruiser and an American Hummer.

== Election results ==
=== State Great Khural elections ===
Election	Party leader	Votes	%	Seats	+/–	Position	Government
2020 (Note: Run as part of the New Coalition.)	Jalbasürengiin Batzandan	213,812	5.35%	0 / 76	New	4th	Extra-parliamentary
2024 (Note: Run as part of the New United Coalition.)	Tsendsürengiin Gantulga	69,682	4.79%	0 / 126	0	▼5th	Extra-parliamentary
