= Luvsanvandangiin Bold =

Mongolian politician

- Лувсанвандангийн Болд
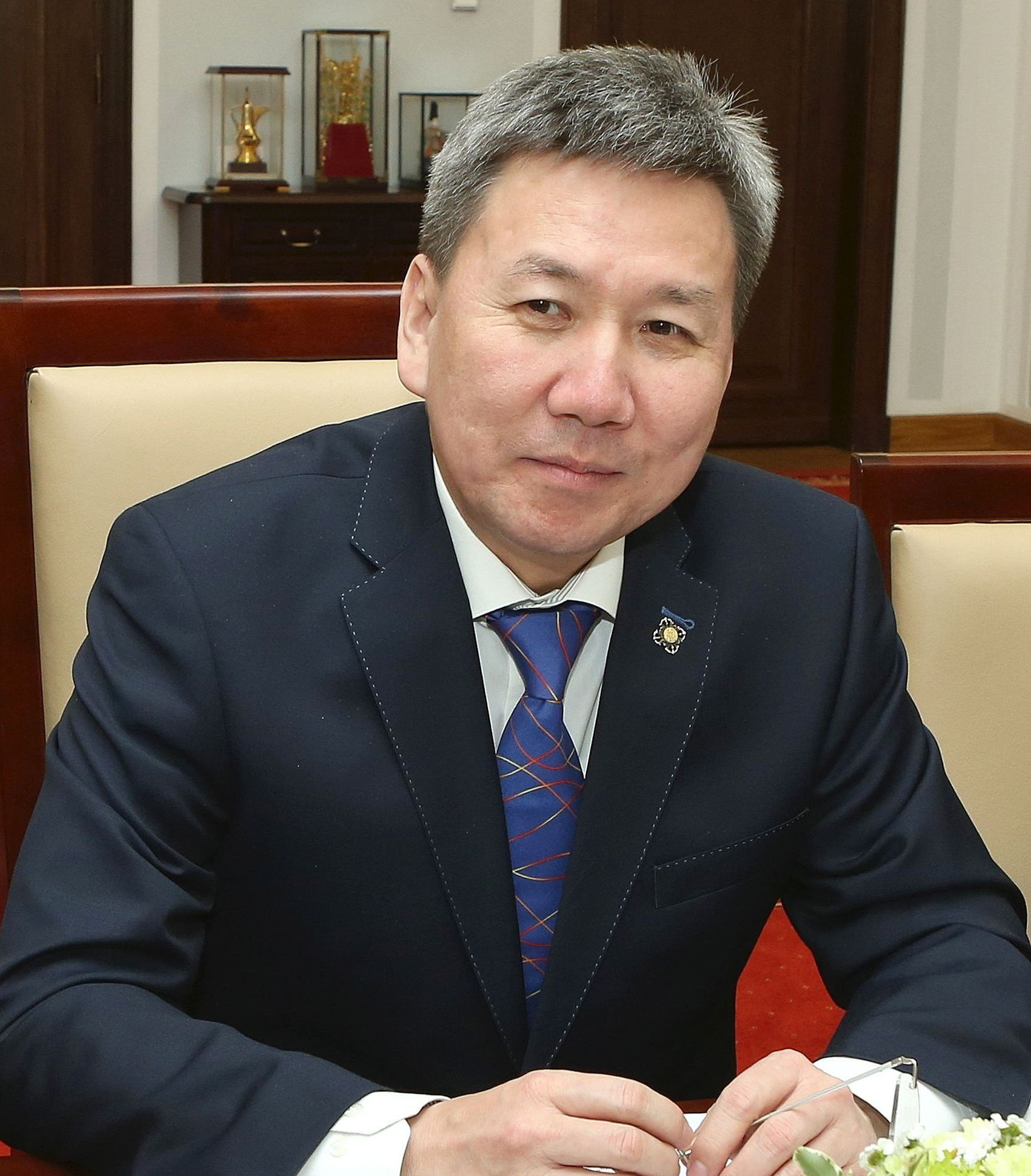
- Bold in 2014

Member of the State Great Khural
- In office July 2008 – 30 June 2020

Minister of Foreign Affairs of Mongolia
- In office 18 August 2012 – 10 December 2014
- President: Tsakhiagiin Elbegdorj
- Prime Minister: Norovyn Altankhuyag
- Preceded by: Gombojavyn Zandanshatar
- Succeeded by: Lundegiin Purevsuren

Minister of Defense of Mongolia
- In office September 2008 – January 2012
- President: Nambaryn Enkhbayar Tsakhiagiin Elbegdorj
- Prime Minister: Sanjiin Bayar; Sükhbaataryn Batbold
- Preceded by: Jamyandorjiin Batkhuyag
- Succeeded by: Jadambyn Enkhbayar

Personal details
- Born: 4 October 1961 (age 64) Ulaanbaatar, Mongolia
- Party: Democratic Party; NEW Party
- Education: Fritz Heckert Trade Union College

Luvsanvandangiin Bold (Mongolian: Лувсанвандангийн Болд; born 4 October 1961) is a Mongolian diplomat who currently serves as Mongolian ambassador to the Kingdom of Belgium.

== Career ==
Bold served as Minister of Defence from 2008 to 2012 and member of State Great Khural (Parliament) from 2008 to 2020 for three consecutive terms, where he served as the head of the Mongolian-German Parliamentary Group in 2012. Bold previously served as Minister of Foreign Affairs of Mongolia from 2012 to 2014, before being appointed ambassador extraordinary and plenipotentiary of Mongolia to the Grand Duchy of Luxembourg with concurrent accreditation to the European Union as head of the Mongolian mission from April 2022.
