= History of Mongolia =

Various nomadic empires, including the Xiongnu (3rd century BC–1st century AD), the Xianbei state (c. AD 156–234), the Rouran Khaganate (330–555), the First (552–603) and Second Turkic Khaganates (682–744) and others, ruled the area of present-day Mongolia. The Khitan people, who used a para-Mongolic language, founded an empire under the Liao dynasty (916–1125), and ruled Mongolia and portions of North China, northern Korea, and the present-day Russian Far East.

In 1206, Genghis Khan was able to unite the Mongol tribes, forging them into a fighting force which went on to establish the largest contiguous empire in world history, the Mongol Empire (1206–1368). After the fragmentation of the Mongol Empire, Mongolia came to be ruled by the Yuan dynasty (1271–1368) based in Khanbaliq (modern Beijing) and administered as part of the Lingbei Province. Buddhism in Mongolia began with the Yuan emperors' conversion to and dissemination of Tibetan Buddhism.

After collapse of the Mongol-led Yuan dynasty in 1368, the Yuan court retreated to the Mongolian Plateau, marking the start of the Northern Yuan dynasty (1368–1635), and the Mongols returned to their earlier patterns of internal strife and their old shamanist ways. However, Buddhism would reemerge in the 16th century.

At the end of the 17th century, Mongolia became part of the Manchu-led Qing dynasty. During the Xinhai Revolution, Mongolia declared independence from Qing but had to struggle until 1921 to firmly establish de facto independence and until 1945 to gain international recognition. As a consequence, Mongolia came under strong Soviet influence. In 1924, the Mongolian People's Republic was declared, and Mongolian politics began to follow the same patterns as Soviet politics of the time. The revolutions of 1989 and the protests of the year that followed led to a multi-party system, a transition to a market economy, and the creation of a new constitution in 1992.

== Prehistory ==
The climate of Central Asia became dry after the large tectonic collision between the Indian plate and the Eurasian plate. This impact threw up the massive chain of mountains known as the Himalayas. The Himalayas, Greater Khingan and Lesser Khingan mountains act like a high wall, blocking the warm and wet climate from penetrating into Central Asia. Many of the mountains of Mongolia were formed during the Late Neogene and Early Quaternary periods. The Mongolian climate was more humid hundreds of thousands of years ago. Mongolia is known to be a source of paleontological discoveries. The first scientifically confirmed dinosaur eggs were found in Mongolia during the 1923 expedition of the American Museum of Natural History, led by Roy Chapman Andrews.

During the middle to late Eocene Epoch, Mongolia was the home of many Paleogene mammals including the Sarkastodon and Andrewsarchus.

Homo erectus possibly inhabited Mongolia up to 800,000 years ago but fossils of Homo erectus have not yet been found in Mongolia. Stone tools have been found in the Gobi Desert, perhaps dating back as much as 800,000 years. Important prehistoric sites are the Paleolithic cave drawings of the Khoid Tsenkheriin Agui (Northern Cave of Blue) in Khovd province, and the Tsagaan Agui (White Cave) in Bayankhongor Province. A Neolithic farming settlement has been found in Dornod Province. Contemporary findings from western Mongolia include only temporary encampments of hunters and fishers. Horse-riding nomadism has been documented by archeological evidence in Mongolia during the Copper and Bronze Age Afanasievo culture (3500–2500 BC).

The Slab-grave culture of the late Bronze and early Iron Age, related to the proto-Mongols, spread over northern, central and eastern Mongolia, Inner Mongolia, Northwest China (Xinjiang, Qilian Mountains etc.), Manchuria, Lesser Khingan, Buryatia, Irkutsk Oblast and Zabaykalsky Krai. This culture is the main archaeological find of Bronze Age Mongolia.

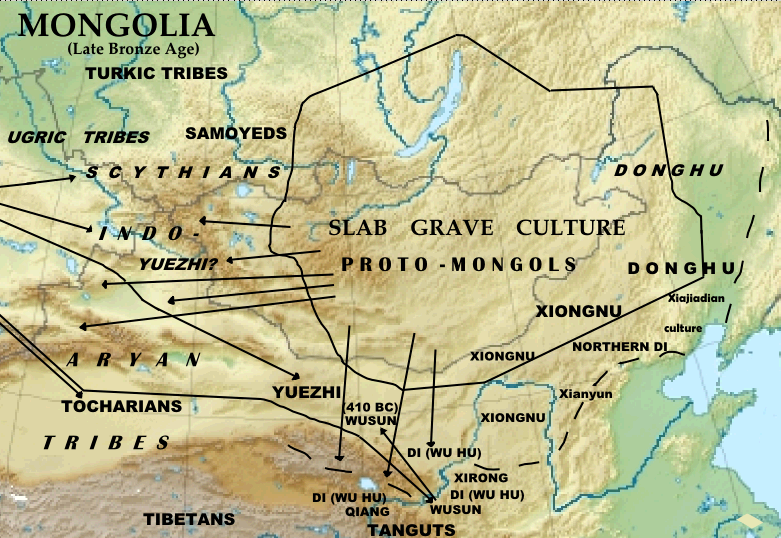
The geographic area the Slab Grave culture covered

Deer stones (also known as reindeer stones) and Khirigsüürs (small kurgans) are probably from this era; other theories date the deer stones as 7th or 8th centuries BC. Deer stones are ancient megaliths carved with symbols that can be found all over central and eastern Eurasia but are concentrated largely in Mongolia and Siberia. Most deer stones occur in association with ancient graves; it is believed that stones are the guardians of the dead. There are around 700 deer stones known in Mongolia of a total of 900 deer stones that have been found in Central Eurasia and South Siberia. Their true purpose and creators are still unknown. Some researchers claim that deer stones are rooted in shamanism and are thought to have been set up during the Bronze Age around 1000 BC, and may mark the graves of important people. Later inhabitants of the area likely reused them to mark their own burial mounds, and perhaps for other purposes. In Mongolia, the Lake Baikal area, and the Sayan and Altai Mountains, there are 550, 20, 20, and 60 known deer stones respectively. Moreover, there are another 20 deer stones in Kazakhstan and the Middle East (Samashyev 1992) and 10 further west, specifically in Ukraine and parts of the Russian Federation, including the provinces of Oren burg and the Caucasus, and near the Elbe River (Mongolian History 2003). According to H.L. Chlyenova, the artistic deer image originated from the Sak tribe and its branches (Chlyenova 1962). Volkov believes that some of the methods of crafting deer stone art are closely related to Scythians (Volkov 1967), whereas Mongolian archaeologist D. Tseveendorj regards deer stone art as having originated in Mongolia during the Bronze Age and spread thereafter to Tuva and the Baikal area (Tseveendorj 1979).

A vast Iron Age burial complex from the 5th to 3rd centuries BC, later also used by the Xiongnu, has been unearthed near Ulaangom.

Before the 20th century, some scholars assumed that the Scythians descended from the Mongolic people. The Scythian community inhabited western Mongolia in the 5th to 6th centuries BC. In 2006, the mummy of a Scythian warrior, which is believed to be about 2,500 years old was a 30-to-40-year-old man with blond hair, was found in the Altai Mountains, Mongolia.

In historical times Eurasian nomads were concentrated on the steppe lands of Central Asia.

By the 8th century BC, the inhabitants of the western part of Mongolia evidently were nomadic Indo-European migrants, either Scythians or Yuezhi. In central and eastern parts of Mongolia were many other tribes that were primarily Northeast Asian in their ethnologic characteristics.

With the appearance of iron weapons by the 3rd century BC, the inhabitants of Mongolia had begun to form clan alliances and lived a hunter and herder lifestyle. The origins of more modern inhabitants are found among the forest hunters and nomadic tribes of Inner Asia. They inhabited a great arc of land extending generally from the Korean Peninsula in the east, across the northern tier of China to present-day Kazakhstan and to the Pamir Mountains and Lake Balkash in the west. During most of recorded history, this has been an area of constant ferment from which emerged numerous migrations and invasions to the southeast (into China), to the southwest (into Transoxiana—modern Uzbekistan, Iran, and India), and to the west (across Scythia toward Europe).

== Ancient period ==
The area of modern Mongolia has been inhabited by groups of nomads since ancient times. The ancient population had a nomadic and hunter lifestyle and lived fairly undisturbed. While most of Central Eurasia had a fairly similar nomadic lifestyle where moving in and around national boundaries and mixing with different settlements was common, the Mongolian steppes were a unique environment because migration was limited by natural barriers such as the Altai Mountains in the west, the Gobi Desert in the south and the freezing wastelands of Siberia in the north, all unsuitable for nomads. These greatly limited migrations, although they also kept out invaders. The clans in Mongolia only allied with other Mongolian clans, with which they shared the same language, religion, and way of life. This would later be a huge advantage in uniting the people in Mongolia against the threat of the expanding Chinese empires. There were repeated conflicts with the Chinese dynasties of Shang and especially Zhou, which had begun conquering and enslaving the Mongolic people in an expansive drift. During the Warring States period (475–221 BC) in China, the northern states of Zhao, Yan, and Qin had begun to encroach into and conquer parts of southern Mongolia. By the time the Qin dynasty had united all of China's kingdoms into one empire in the 3rd century BC, the Xiongnu confederacy had formed in the Mongolian plains, transforming all of the independent clans into one single state that reassured their safety and independence from an expanding Qin.

=== Xiongnu (209 BC – 93 AD) ===
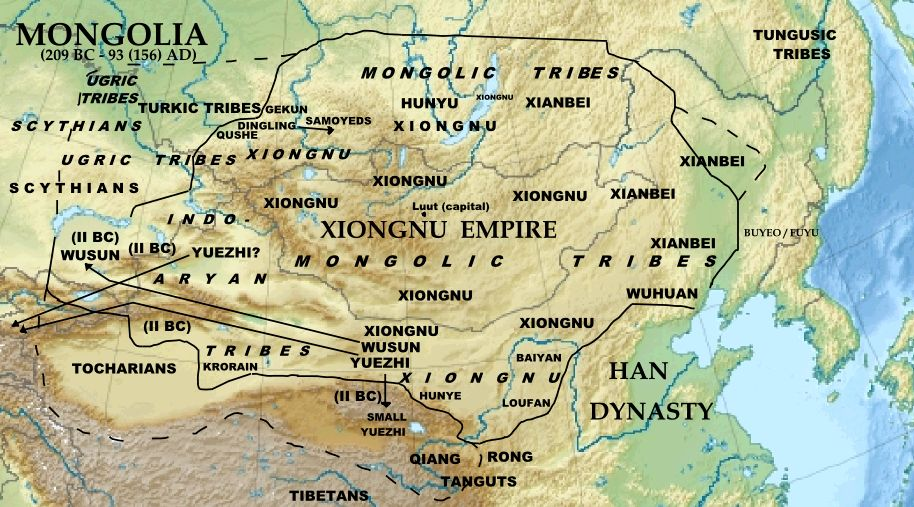
Xiongnu Empire

The establishment of the Xiongnu empire in Mongolia in the 3rd century BC marks the beginning of statehood in the territory of Mongolia.

The identity of the ethnic core of Xiongnu has been a subject of varied hypotheses and some scholars, including Alexey Okladnikov, Paul Pelliot and Byambyn Rinchen, who insisted on a Mongolic origin.

There are many cultural similarities between the Xiongnu and Mongols such as yurt on cart, composite bow, board games, horn bow and long song. Mongolian long song is believed to date back at least 2,000 years. Mythical origin of the long song mentioned in "Book of Wei" (Volume 113).

The first significant appearance of nomads came late in the 3rd century BC, when the Chinese repelled an invasion of the Xiongnu across the Yellow River from the Gobi.

The founder of the Xiongnu empire was Toumen. He was violently succeeded by his son Modu Shanyu, who then conquered and unified various tribes. At the peak of its power, the Xiongnu confederacy stretched from Lake Baikal in the north to the Great Wall in the south and from the Tian Shan mountains in the west to the Greater Khingan ranges in the east. In the 2nd century BC the Xiongnu turned their attention westward to the region of the Altai Mountains and Lake Balkhash, inhabited by Indo-European-speaking nomadic peoples, including Yuezhi (Yüeh-chih in Wade–Giles), who had relocated from China's present-day Gansu Province as a result of their earlier defeat by the Xiongnu. Endemic warfare between these two nomadic peoples reached a climax in the latter part of the 3rd century and the early decades of the 2nd century BC; the Xiongnu were triumphant. The Yuezhi then migrated to the southwest where, early in the 2nd century, they began to appear in the Oxus (the modern Amu Darya) Valley, to change the course of history in Bactria, Iran, and eventually India.

In 200 BC, the Han dynasty of China launched a military campaign into the territory, attempting to subjugate the Xiongnu. However the Xiongnu forces ambushed and encircled the Han Emperor Gaozu at Baideng for seven days. Emperor Gao was forced to submit to the Xiongnu, and a treaty was signed in 198 BC recognising all the territories to the north from the Great Wall should belong to the Xiongnu, while the territory to the south of the Great Wall should belong to the Han. In addition, China was obliged to marry princesses and pay annual tribute to the Xiongnu. This "marriage alliance" was far from peaceful, as Xiongnu raids into the fertile southern land never ceased.

The Xiongnu again raided northern China around 200 BC, finding that the inadequately defended Great Wall was not a serious obstacle. By the middle of the 2nd century BC, they controlled all of northern and western China north of the Yellow River. This renewed threat led the Chinese to improve their defences in the north, while building up and improving the army, particularly the cavalry, and while preparing long-range plans for an invasion of Mongolia.

By 176 BC, domain of the Xiongnu covered 4,030,000 km^{2} (1,560,000 sq mi). Xiongnu's capital was located on the beach of the Orkhon River in central Mongolia.

A Chinese army, which had adopted Xiongnu military technology—wearing trousers and using mounted archers with stirrups—pursued the Xiongnu across the Gobi Desert in a ruthless punitive expedition. Fortified walls built by various Chinese warring states were connected to make a 2,300 km (1,400 mi) Great Wall along the northern border, as a barrier to further nomadic inroads. Between 130 and 121 BC, Chinese armies drove the Xiongnu back across the Great Wall, weakened their hold on Gansu Province as well as on what is now Inner Mongolia, and finally pushed them north of the Gobi into central Mongolia. The Xiongnu, once more turning their attention to the west and the southwest, raided deep into the Oxus Valley between 73 and 44 BC. The descendants of the Yuezhi and their Chinese rulers, however, formed a common front against the Xiongnu and repelled them.

During the next century, as Chinese strength waned, border warfare between the Chinese and the Xiongnu was almost constant. Gradually the nomads forced their way back into Gansu and the northern part of what is now China's Xinjiang. In about the middle of the 1st century AD, a revitalized Eastern Han dynasty (25–220 AD) slowly recovered these territories, driving the Xiongnu back into the Altai Mountains and the steppes north of the Gobi. During the late 1st century AD, having reestablished administrative control over southern China and northern Vietnam that had been lost briefly at beginning of this same century, the Eastern Han made a concerted effort to reassert dominance over Inner Asia.

In 48 AD, the Xiongnu empire was weakened as it was divided into the southern and northern Xiongnu. The northern Xiongnu migrated to the west. They established Üeban state (160–490) in modern Kazakhstan and the Hunnic Empire (370s–469) in Europe. The Xianbei that were under the Xiongnu rebelled in 93 AD, ending the Xiongnu domination in Mongolia.

Recent excavations of Xiongnu graves at the site Gol Mod in the Khairkhan of Arkhangai province, discovered bronze decorations with images of a creature resembling the unicorn and images of deities resembling the Greco-Roman deities. These discoveries lead to a hypothesis that the Xiongnu had relations with the Greco-Roman world 2,000 years ago.

=== Xianbei (147–234) ===
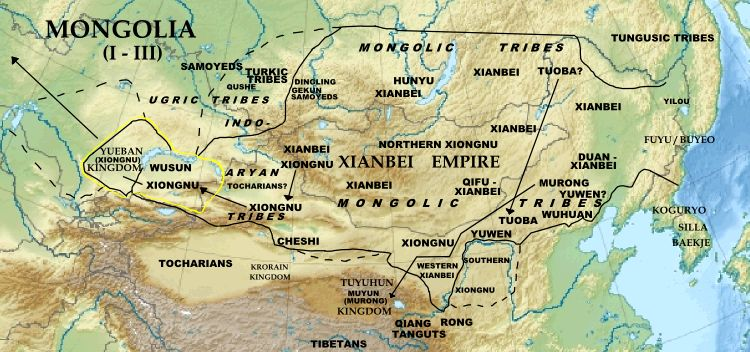
Map showing the location of the Xianbei

The Xianbei (or Hsien-pei in Wade–Giles) were the northern branch of the Donghu (or Tung Hu, the Eastern Hu), a proto-Mongol group mentioned in Chinese histories as existing as early as the 4th century BC. The language of the Donghu is believed to be proto-Mongolic by modern scholars. The Donghu were among the first peoples conquered by the Xiongnu. Once the Xiongnu state weakened, however, the Donghu rebelled. By the 1st century AD, two major subdivisions of the Donghu had developed: the proto-Mongolic Xianbei in the north and the Wuhuan in the south. When the Xiongnu split into two parts in AD 48, the Xianbei moved (apparently from the east) into the region vacated by the Xiongnu.

The Xianbei gained strength beginning from the 1st century AD and were consolidated into a state under Tanshihuai in 147. He expelled the Xiongnu from Jungaria, and pushed the Dingling to the north of the Sayans, thus securing domination of the Mongolic elements in what is now Khalkha and Chaharia. The Xianbei successfully repelled an invasion of the Han dynasty in 167 and conquered areas of northern China in 180.

There are various hypotheses about the language and ethnic links of the Xianbei and the most widely accepted version suggests that the Xianbei were a Mongolic ethnic group and their branches are the ancestors of many Mongolic peoples such as the Rouran, Khitan and Menggu Xibei, who are suggested to be proto-Mongols. The ruler of the Xianbei state was elected by a congress of nobility. The Xianbei used woodcut tallies called Kemu as a form of non-verbal communication. Besides extensive livestock husbandry, the Xianbei were also engaged on a limited scale in farming and handicraft. The Xianbei fractured in the 3rd century.

The Xianbei established an empire, which, although short-lived, gave rise to numerous tribal states along the Chinese frontier. Among these states was that of the Toba (T'o-pa in Wade–Giles), a subgroup of the Xianbei, in modern China's Shanxi Province.

The Wuhuan also were prominent in the 2nd century, but they disappeared thereafter; possibly they were absorbed in the Xianbei western expansion. The Xianbei and the Wuhuan used mounted archers in warfare, and they had temporary war leaders instead of hereditary chiefs. Agriculture, rather than full-scale nomadism, was the basis of their economy. In the 6th century, the Wuhuan were driven out of Inner Asia into the Russian steppe.

Chinese control of parts of Inner Asia did not last beyond the opening years of the 2nd century AD, and, as the Eastern Han dynasty ended early in the 3rd century AD, suzerainty was limited primarily to the Gansu corridor. The Xianbei were able to make forays into a China beset with internal unrest and political disintegration. By 317 all of China north of the Yangtze River had been overrun by nomadic peoples: the Xianbei from the north; some remnants of the Xiongnu from the northwest; and the Chiang people of Gansu and Tibet from the west and the southwest. Chaos prevailed as these groups warred with each other and repulsed the efforts of the fragmented Chinese kingdoms south of the Yangtze River to reconquer the region.

Tuoba, a faction of the Xianbei, established the Tuoba Wei empire in northern China in 386. By the end of the 4th century, the region between the Yangtze and the Gobi, including much of modern Xinjiang, was dominated by the Tuoba. Emerging as the partially sinicized state of Dai between AD 338 and 376 in the Shanxi area, the Tuoba established control over the region as the Northern Wei (AD 386–533). Northern Wei armies drove back the Rouran, a newly arising nomadic Mongol people in the steppes north of the Altai Mountains, and reconstructed the Great Wall. During the 4th century also, the Huns left the steppes north of the Aral Sea to invade Europe. By the middle of the 5th century, Northern Wei had penetrated into the Tarim Basin in Inner Asia, as the Chinese had in the 2nd century. As the empire grew, however, Tuoba tribal customs were supplanted by those of the Chinese, an evolution not accepted by all Tuoba. Tuoba Wei existed until 581.

=== Rouran Khaganate (330–555) ===
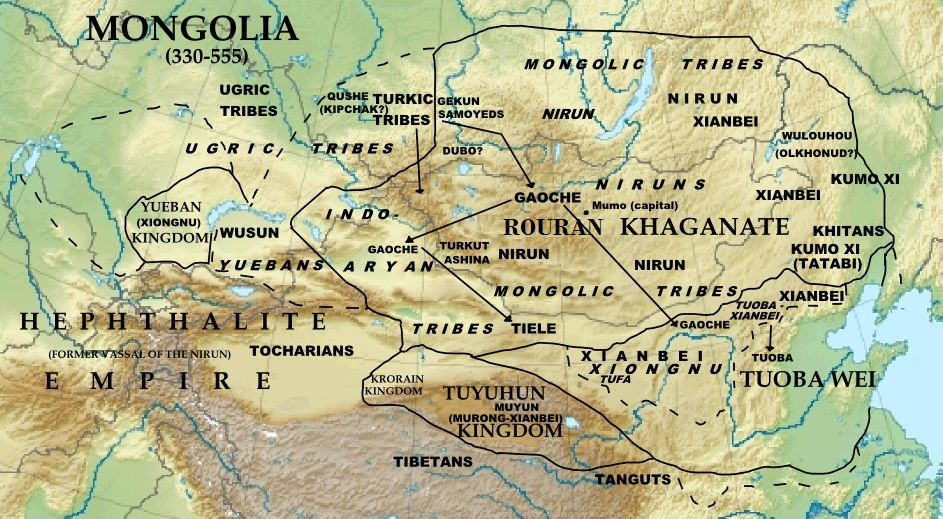
Rouran Khaganate

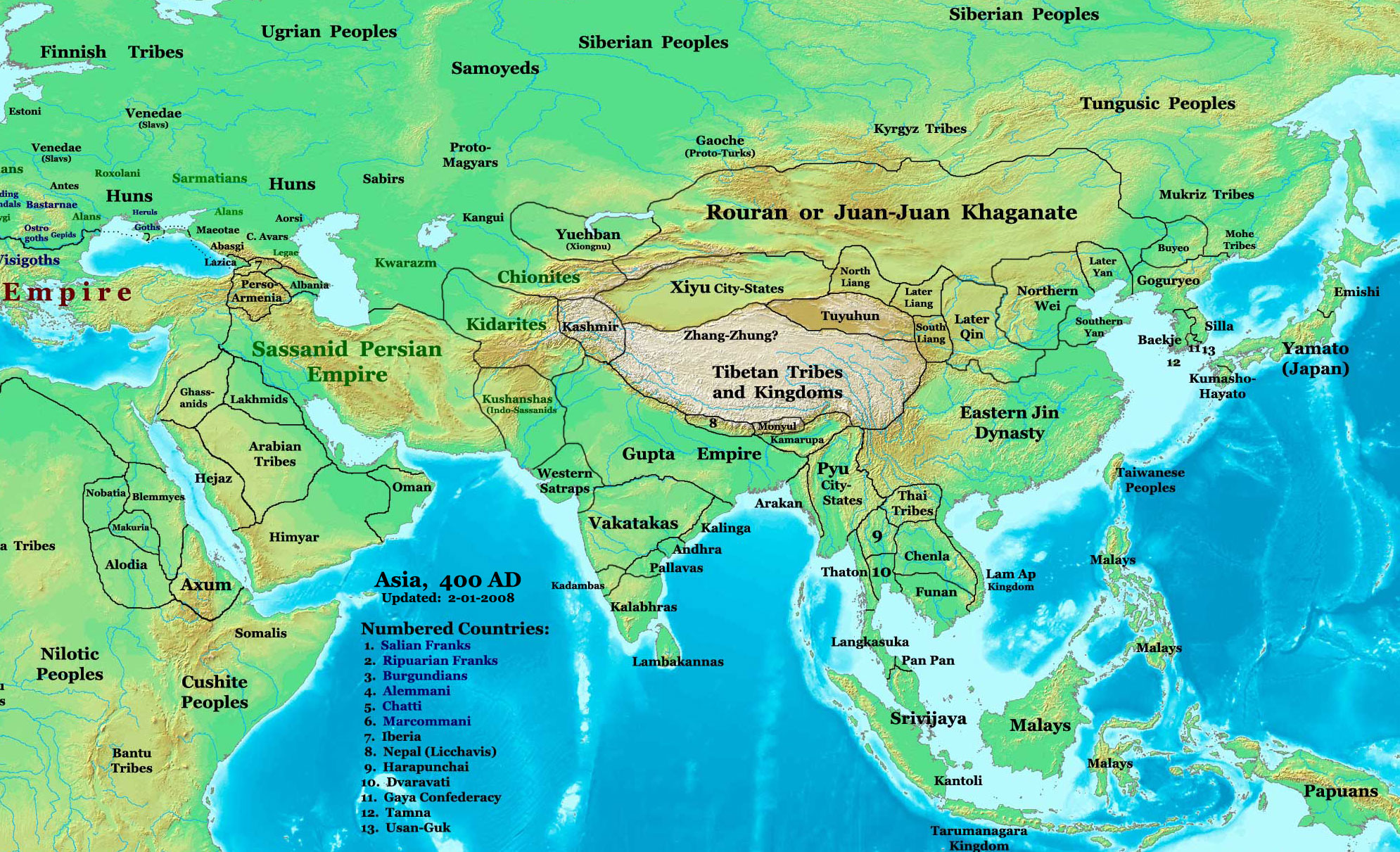
Asia in AD 400, showing the Rouran Khaganate, Tuoba's Northern Wei, Xianbei's Tuyuhun Kingdom, Southern Liang, Later Yan and Xiongnu's Üeban and Northern Liang states

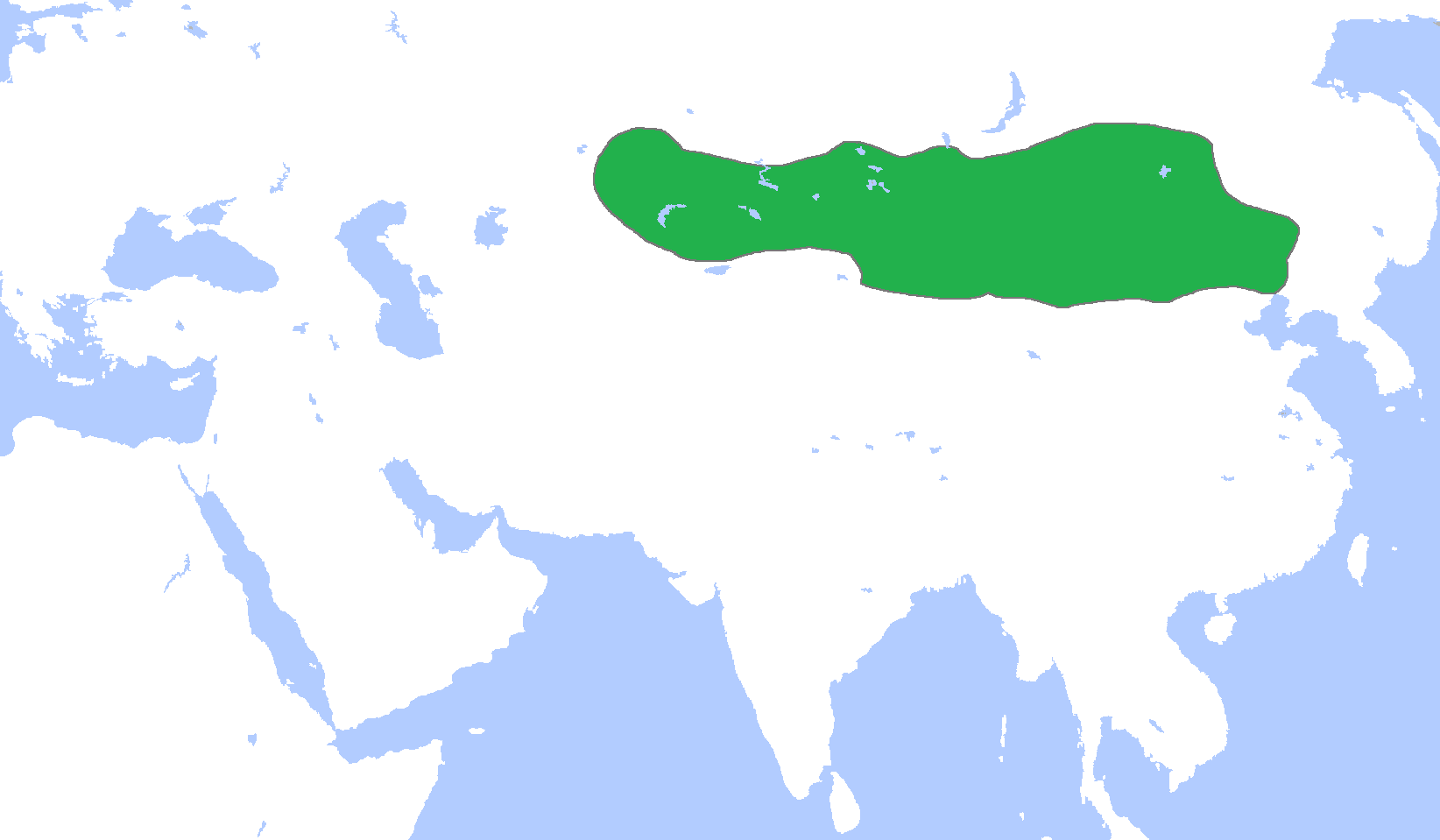
Rouran Khaganate circa 500 AD

A branch of the Xianbei, the Rouran (also known as Nirun) were consolidated under Mugulü. In the late 5th century, the Rouran established a powerful nomadic empire spreading north of the Northern Wei. It was probably the Rouran who first used the title khan for their supreme rulers. The Rouran ruled Mongolia, eastern Kazakhstan, part of Gansu, northern Xinjiang, Inner Mongolia, parts of Northeastern China and southern Siberia. The Hephthalites was a vassal state to the Rouran for 100 years. Shelun assumed the title of khagan in 402 landmarking the establishment of the Rouran Khaganate. The Tuoba waged long wars against the Rouran Khaganate. The Göktürks that were subjects of the Rouran revolted in 552 establishing the Turkic Khaganate. The Rouran Khaganate was finally defeated by the Göktürks in 555. Some of the Rouran left the present territory of Mongolia. A number of historians maintain that they established the Avarian Khaganate between the river Danube and the Carpathian Mountains. The Rourans that stayed in Mongolia became the ancestors of the Tatar tribes. The Tatars and other Mongol tribes lived in the eastern part Mongolia during the Turkic period. Other Mongols that migrated east returned in the 8th century.

=== Turkic period (555–840) ===
==== Turkic Khaganates (552–630, 682–744), Tang rule (646–682) ====
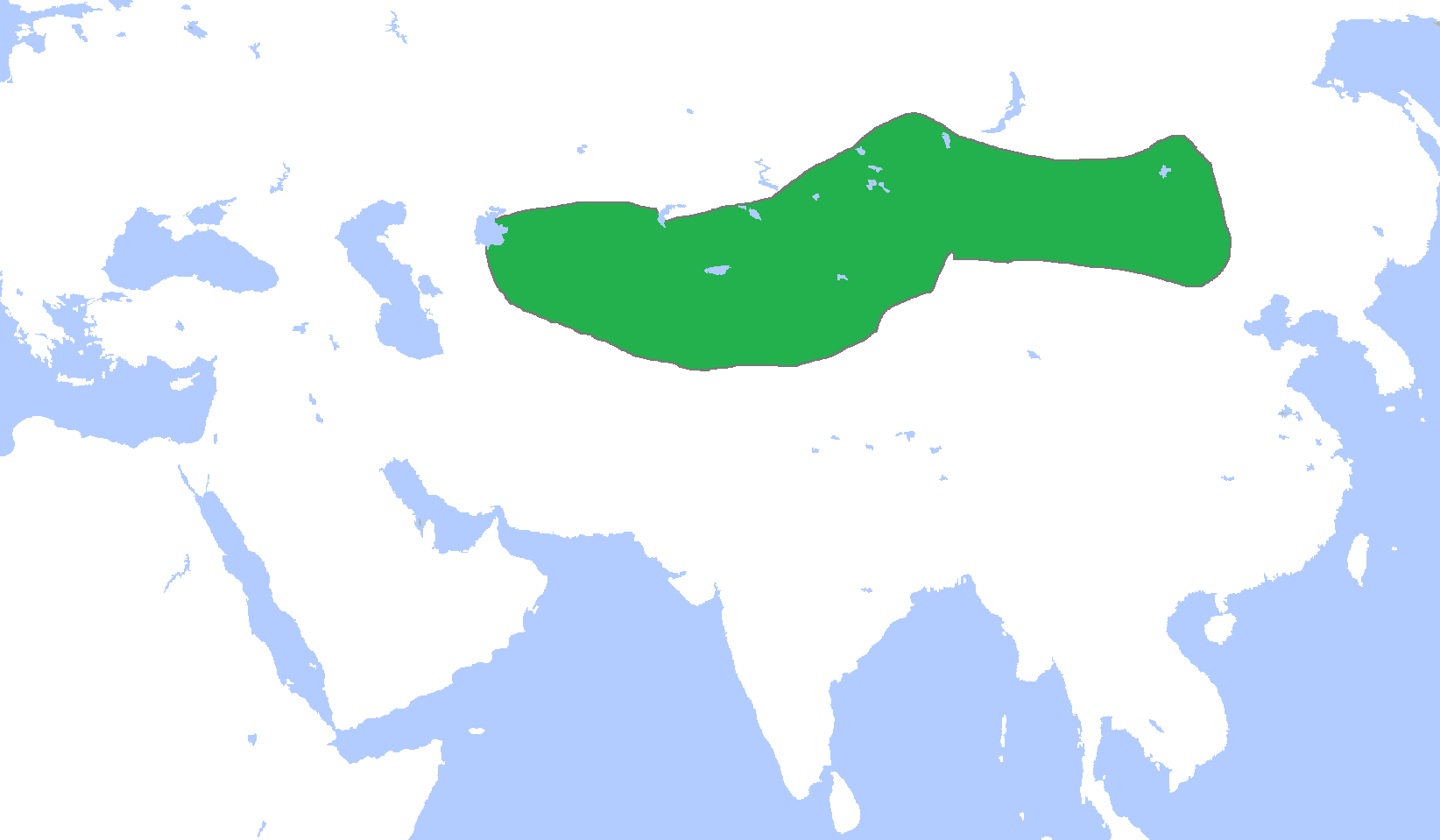
Gökturk Khaganate, 551–572 AD

The Northern Wei in northern China was disintegrating rapidly because of revolts of semi-tribal Tuoba military forces that were opposed to being sinicized, when disaster struck the flourishing Rouran Khaganate. In 552 AD the Göktürks –who were subjects to the Rouran and served as blacksmiths– revolted against their Rouran rulers. The uprising began in the Altai Mountains, where many were serfs working the iron mines. Therefore, the Göktürks revolt of 552 is often called the "Blacksmiths' rebellion". The uprising was headed by Bumin Qaghan, who became the founder of the First Turkic Khaganate. Thus, from the outset of their revolt, they had the advantage of controlling what had been one of the major bases of Rouran power. Between 546 and 553, the Göktürks overthrew the Rouran and established themselves as the most powerful force in Central Asia.

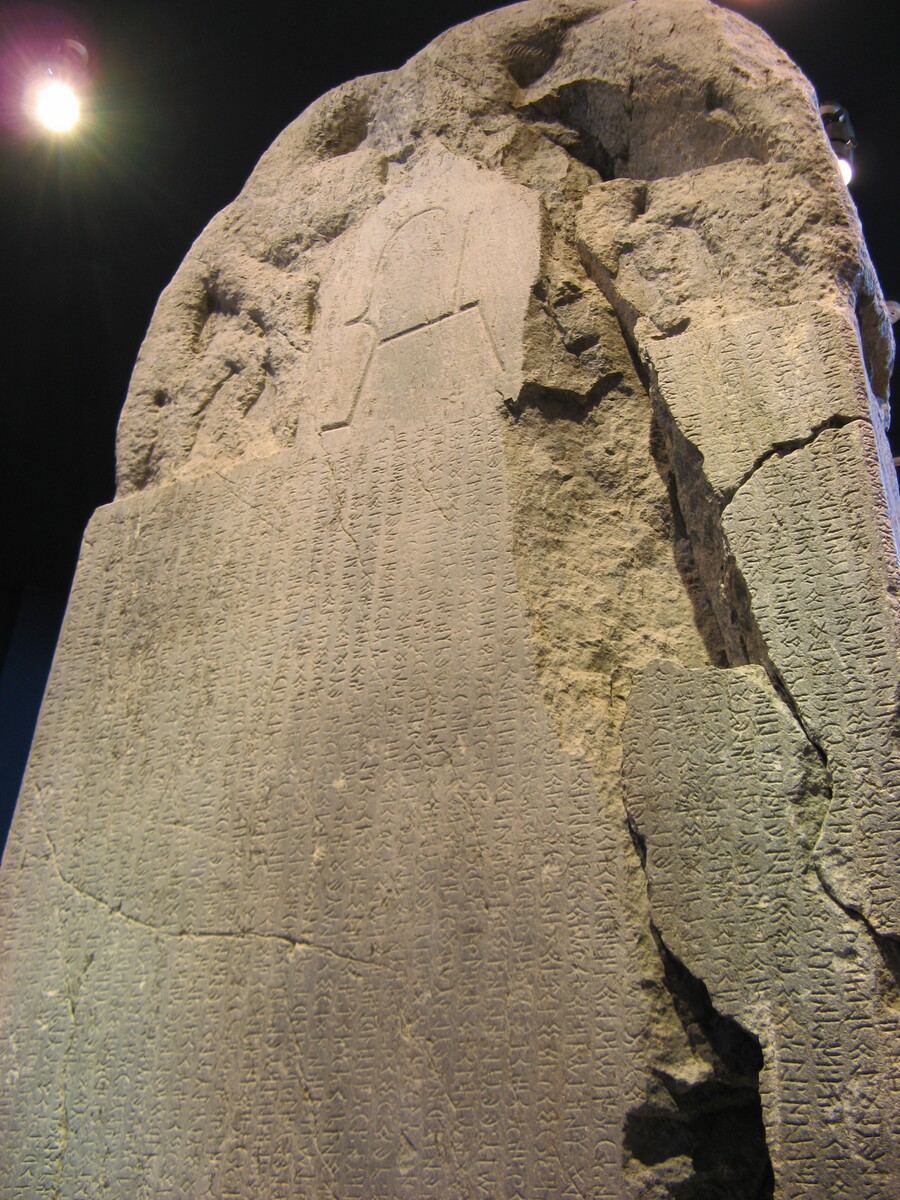
Kul Tigin Monument inscribed in Old Turkic alphabet

The Northern Qi and Northern Zhou dynasties of China surrendered in 570 and began paying tribute to the Göktürks. However, the newly established Sui dynasty stopped sending tribute to the Göktürks and constant war between the Sui and Turkic Khaganate began. The Turkic Khaganate was partitioned in 583 into an Eastern Turkic Khaganate and Western Turkic Khaganate through a plot made by the Sui. Finally in 584, the Eastern Turks recognised Sui suzerainty. The Turkic Khaganate began to revolt and hasten the border in 615 after Emperor Yang of Sui's failed expedition in Goguryeo. The internal struggle between the Turkic nobles lead to their defeat by the Tang dynasty of China in 630. From 629 to 648, a reunited China–under the Tang dynasty–destroyed the power of the Eastern Turks north of the Gobi; established suzerainty over the Khitan, a semi-nomadic Para-Mongolic people who lived in areas that became the modern Chinese provinces of Heilongjiang and Jilin; and established the Anbei Protectorate in the Mongolian Steppes. The Uyghur khagan was installed as Anbei protector, who inhabited the region between the Altai Mountains and Khitan's land. Between 641 and 648, the Tang conquered the Western Turks, re-establishing Chinese sovereignty over Xinjiang and exacting tribute from west of the Pamir Mountains. The Göktürks continuously struggled against the subjugation by the Tang dynasty started in 679. An uprising of 682 under the leadership of Kutuluk and Tonyukuk led to restoration of the Turkic Khaganate, known as the Second Turkic Khaganate.

For a brief period at the beginning of the 7th century, a new consolidation of Göktürks, under the Western Turk ruler Tardu, again threatened China. In 701, Tardu's army besieged Chang'an (modern Xi'an), then the capital of China. Tardu was turned back, however, and, upon his death two years later, the Turkic state again fragmented. The Eastern Turks nonetheless continued their depredations, occasionally threatening Chang'an. In the early 8th century, an invading army of 450,000 soldiers headed by the Wu Zhou empress regnant Wu Zetian was defeated and chased back by Mojo Khagan. The Turkic empire finally ended in 744 by the combined forces of Chinese, Uyghurs and other nomads.

==== Uyghur Khaganate (744–840) ====
The Uyghurs, who were subjects to the Göktürks, revolted in 744 and founded the Uyghur Khaganate which replaced the Eastern Turkic Khaganate. The Uyghur kagan Bayanchur established the city of Ordu-Baliq on the Orkhon river in 751. Tang China invited the Uyghurs to subdue the An Lushan rebellion in 755. Successful campaigns of the Uyghur Khaganate led to a peace with the Tang dynasty which paid compensation for the suppression of An Lushan in silk and grain for 12 years after 766. Though a faction of the Uyghurs were Buddhists, Manichaeism became the official religion of the Khaganate in the 8th century. Nevertheless, the majority of the Uyghurs remained shamanists. The culture and economy of the Uyghur Khaganate were more advanced than those of its predecessors. The Uyghurs used a 12-month calendar and calculated the dates of solar and lunar eclipses. The Uyghurs developed their own writing system based on Sogdian script. The Tang dynasty secretly encouraged the Yenisei Kyrgyz and Karluks to attack the Uyghurs and the Uyghur Khaganate fell under an invasion of the Yenisei Kyrgyz in 840.

The destruction of Uyghur Khaganate by the Yenisei Kyrgyz resulted in the end of Turkic dominance in Mongolia. According to historians, the Yenisei Kyrgyz were not interested in assimilating newly acquired lands. The Kyrgyz state was centered on Khakassia.

=== Liao dynasty (916–1125) ===
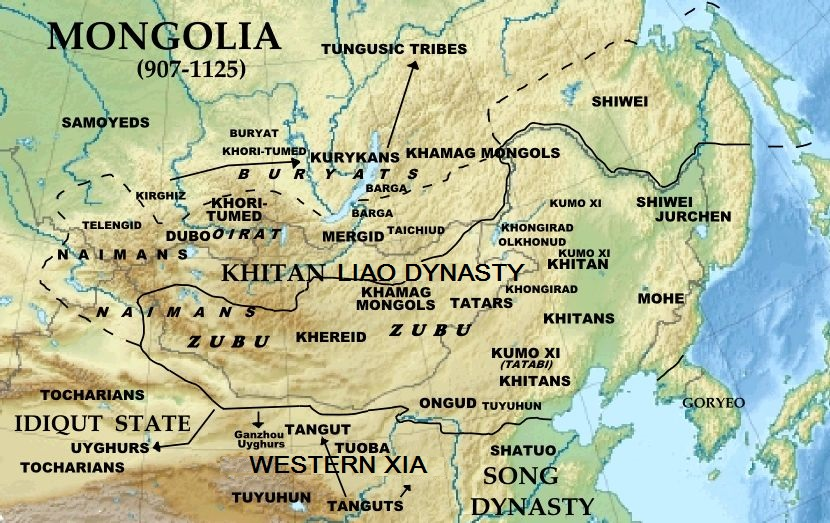
Liao dynasty in 1100

The Khitans were an ethnic group whose language was related to the Mongolic languages. Its khagan Yelü Abaoji claimed imperial title in 916 and established the Liao dynasty. The Liao dynasty covered a significant portion of what is now Mongolia including the basins of the three rivers Kherlen, Tuul and Orkhon. The Khitans occupied the areas vacated by the Turkic Uyghurs bringing them under their control.

The Liao dynasty soon grew strong and occupied parts of Northern China, including modern-day Beijing. By 925, the Khitans ruled eastern Mongolia, most of Manchuria, and much of China proper north of the Yellow River. By the middle of the 10th century, Khitan chieftains had established themselves as emperors of northern China, and the Liao dynasty is considered a dynasty of China. The Khitans built cities and exerted dominion over their agricultural subjects as a means of consolidating their empire.

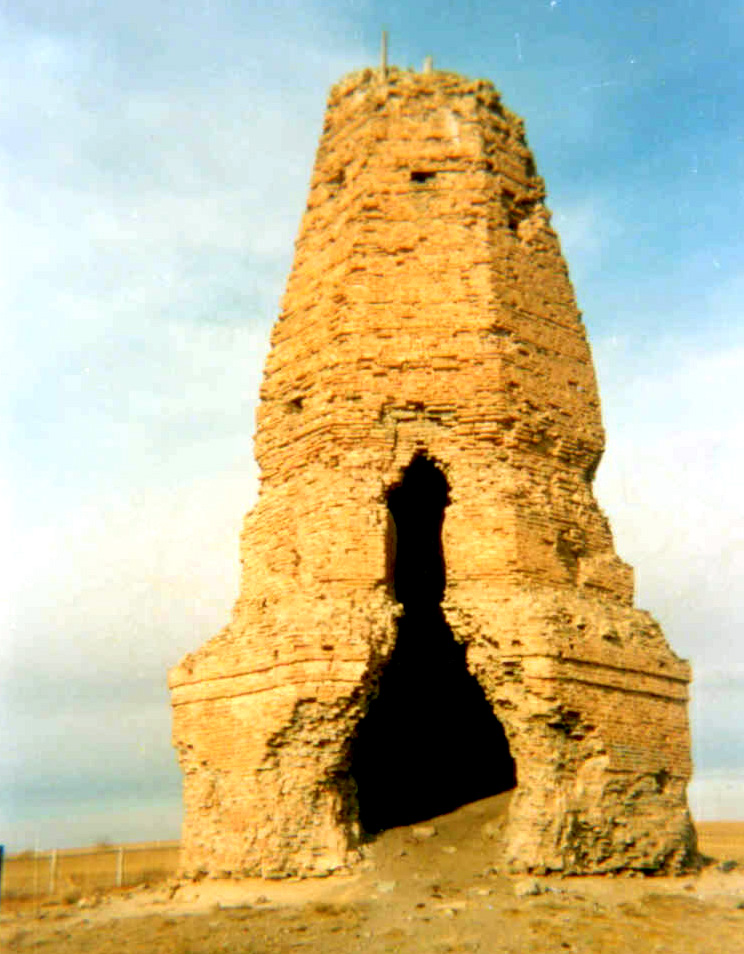
Stupa in the Khitan city Bars-Hot in Dornod, Mongolia

The territory of the empire consisted of two parts: one populated by pastoral herders in the north and the other populated by croppers in the south. The two parts of the empire actively traded with each other. Lubugu, a grandson of Ambagyan, and a scholar named Tulyubu developed a Grand Alphabet based on the Chinese hieroglyphics in 920. Later, Tela, a son of Ambagyan, developed a Minor Alphabet based on the Uyghur script. A printing technology developed in the Liao territory. The Khitan language was widely studied abroad.

A Tungusic people, the Jurchens, ancestors of the Manchus, formed an alliance with the Song dynasty and reduced the Liao dynasty to vassal status in a seven-year war (1115–1122). The Jurchen leader Wanyan Aguda proclaimed himself the founder of a new empire, the Jin dynasty. Scarcely pausing in their conquests, the Jurchens subdued neighboring Goryeo in 1226 and invaded the territory of their former allies, the Song dynasty, to precipitate a series of wars with the Song that continued through the remainder of the century.

The Liao dynasty fell in 1125. Some Khitans fled west under the leadership of Yelü Dashi after their defeat by the Jurchens and founded the Western Liao dynasty (1124–1218) in present-day Xinjiang and eastern Kazakhstan with capital in Balasagun, modern Kyrgyzstan. In addition, the Western Liao also controlled some highly autonomous vassalized states, such as Khwarezm, the Eastern and the Western Kara-Khanids, etc. In 1218, Genghis Khan destroyed the Western Liao, after which the Khitans passed into obscurity. The modern-day minority of Mongolic-speaking Daurs in China are their direct descendants based on DNA evidence and other Khitans assimilated into the Mongols (Southern Mongols), Turkic peoples and Han Chinese.

== Medieval period ==
=== Confederations and khanates in the 12th century ===
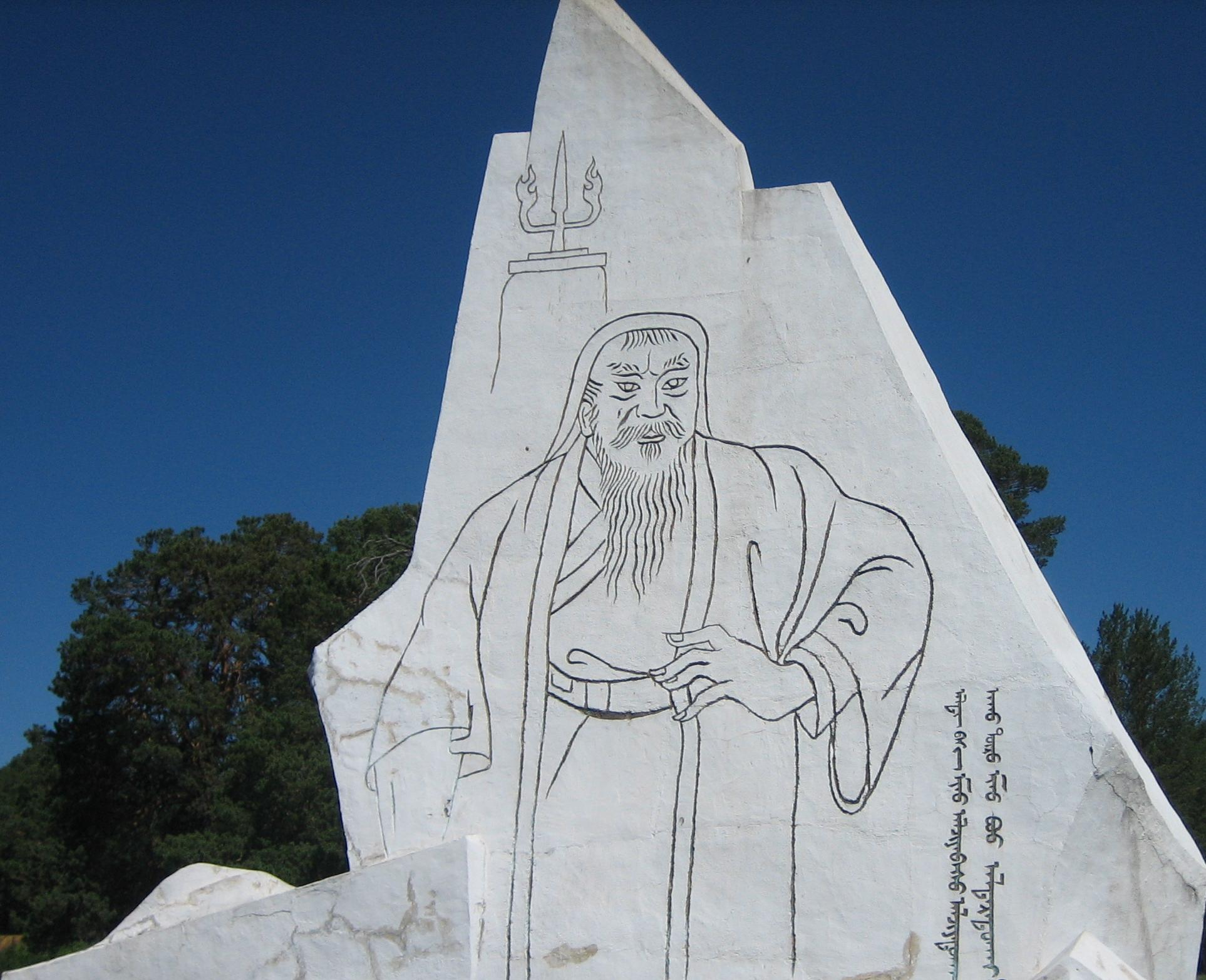
Statue of Temujin in Dadal sum, Khentii, the region of his birth

12th-century Mongolia was characterized by rivalry between many tribes and confederations (khanligs or khanate). A confederation of tribes under the name Mongol was known from the 8th century. Some Shiwei tribes, though little is known, have been considered the ancestors of the Mongols according to ancient Chinese records. Term "Shiwei" was an umbrella term of the Mongolic and Tungusic peoples in the 6th to 12th centuries. During the 5th century, they occupied the area east of the Greater Khingan Range, what is the Hulunbuir, Argun (Ergune), Nen (Noon), Middle Amur, and the Zeya Watersheds. They may have been divided into five to twenty tribes. They were said to be dressed in fish skins. They may have been nomadic, staying in the marshy lowlands in the winter and the mountains during the summer. The burial was by exposure in trees. Their language is described as being similar to Manchu-Tungusic languages and Khitan. The Turkic Khaganate installed tuduns, or governors over the Shiwei and collected tribute. Other Shiwei may have stayed and become the Evenks. The Kitans conquered the Shiwei during the late 9th century. One Shiwei tribe, living near the Amur and Ergune rivers, was called the "Menggu" (Mongol).

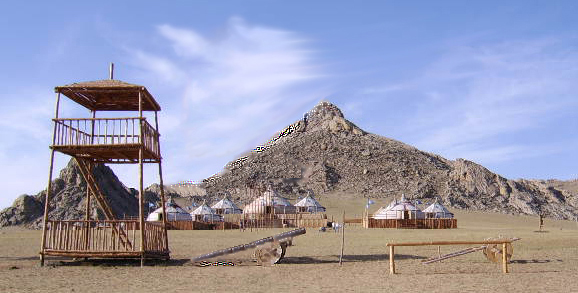
A camp of a Mongolian tribe

The confederations of core Mongol tribes were transforming into a statehood in the early 12th century and came to be known as the Khamag Mongol confederacy. The people of Mongolia at this time were predominantly spirit worshipers, with shamans providing spiritual and religious guidance to the people and tribal leaders.

The Khamag Mongols occupied one of the most fertile areas of the country—the basins of the rivers Onon, Kherlen and Tuul in the Khentii mountains. The first known khan of Khamag Mongol is Khabul Khan from Khiyad tribe. Khabul Khan successfully repelled the invasions of Jin dynasty. He was succeeded by Ambaghai Khan from Taichuud tribe. Ambagai was captured by the Tatars while he came to deliver his daughter as a bride to the Tatar confederacy and was given to the Jurchens of Jin dynasty who cruelly executed him, nailing to a "wooden donkey". Ambagai was succeeded by Hotula Khan, son of Khabul Khan. Hotula Khan engaged in 13 battles with the Tatars endeavouring to avenge Ambagai Khan. Khamag Mongol was unable to elect a khan after Hotula died. However, Khabul's grandson Yesukhei baghatur was a major chief of Khamag Mongol.

Yesukhei was poisoned by the Tatars in 1171 when his eldest son Temujin was 9 years old. Shortly after Yesukhei died, Targudai Kiriltug of Taichuud moved away with the subjects of Yesukhei, leaving young Temujin, his mother and his younger siblings without support. Hence, Khamag Mongol remained in political crisis until 1189.

In the 12th century the Khamag Mongol Khanate, Tatar confederation, Keraite Khanate, Merkit confederation, Naiman Khanate were five major Mongolic tribal confederations and khanates in the Mongolian plateau.

The Tatar confederacy first appeared in recorded history in 732. The Tatars became subjects of the Khitan in the 10th century. After the fall of the Khitan empire, the Tatars experienced pressure from the Jin dynasty and were urged to fight against the other Mongol tribes. The Tatars lived on the fertile pastures around the lakes Hulun and Buir and occupied a trade route to China.

The Keraites between the mountain ranges of Khangai and Khentii were centered on the site of today's city Ulaanbaatar in the willow groves of the Tuul river. Markus Buyruk Khan was khan of the Keraites in the 12th century. Markus was succeeded by Tooril khan. In his feud with his brothers for the throne of the Keraites, he was repeatedly aided by Yesukhei Bagatur of Khamag Mongol.

The Mergid confederacy was located in the basin of the river Selenge. The Hori Tümeds and Buryats lived around the lake Baikal.

The Naiman confederacy was situated between the mountain ranges of Altai and Khangai. The Ongut tribes lived at the north of Gobi. Other tribes were Olkhunut, Bayud, Khongirad, Oirats and so forth. While most of the Mongolian tribes were Shamanists, Nestorian Christianity was practiced in a number of confederations such as Keraites and Ongut.

=== Consolidation of the Mongol state ===
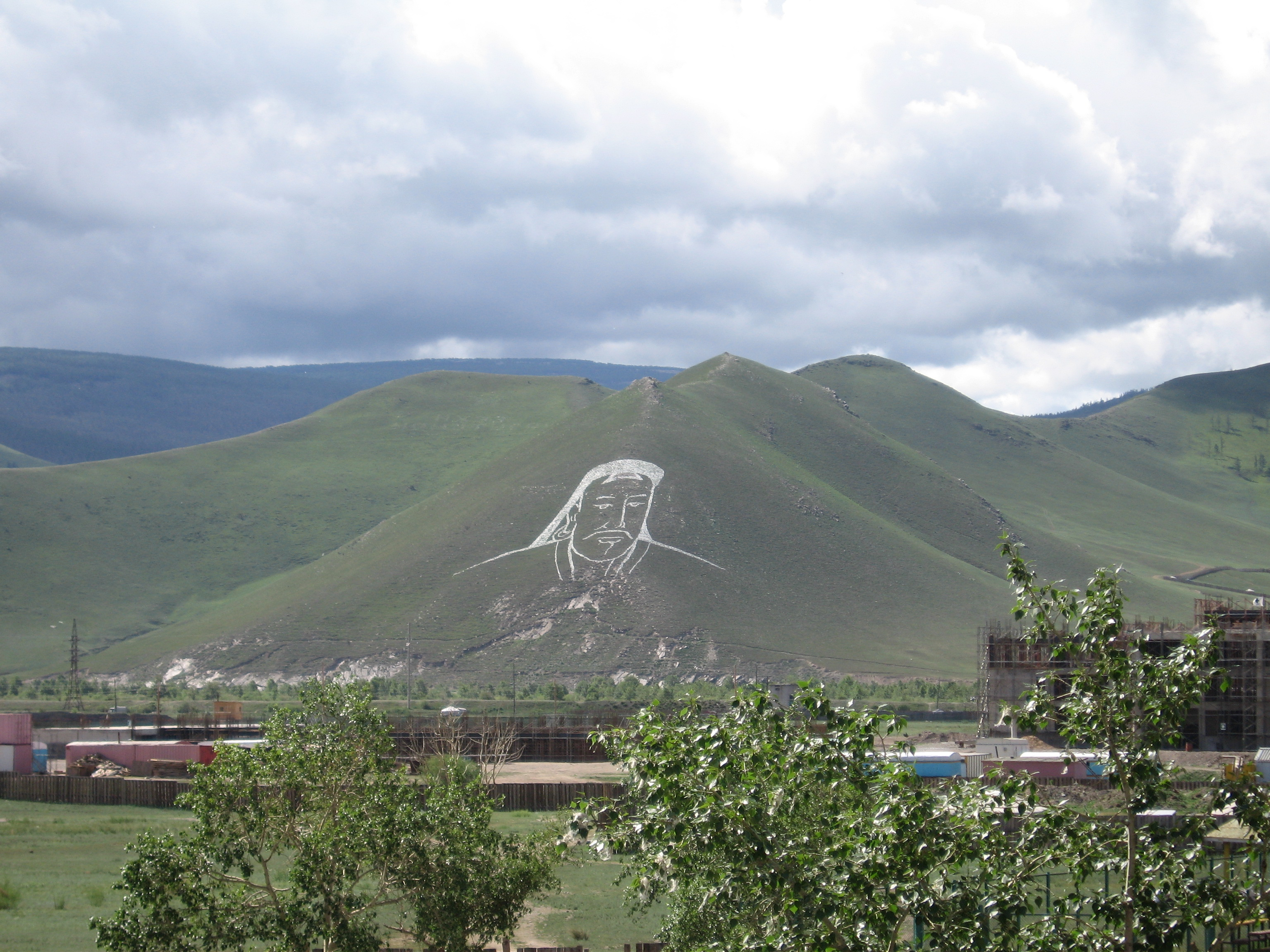
Geoglyph portrait of Chinggis Khaan on Mt. Bogd Khan

Temujin (1162–1227) defeated and subjugated the "Three Mergids" in 1189 with the support of Tooril Khan of Kereit, the blood brother of his father. Another ally who helped Temujin in this venture was his own blood brother Jamukha of Jadaran clan. The Mergids had attacked the home of Temujin and captured his wife Börte of Hongirad tribe revenging for a much earlier event in which Temujin's father Yesukhei deprived a Mergid chief Chiledu his bride Hoelun of Olkhunut tribe, who became the mother of Temujin. The striving of Temujin to free his wife became a reason for the campaign against the Mergids. After the defeat of the Mergid, the reputation of Temujin rose rapidly and the leading members of the Khamag Mongol aristocracy enthroned him with title Chinggis Khan (Genghis Khan), as the ruler of Khamag Mongol. It is speculated to be an ancient form of the word "Tenggis"—ocean, sea.

A conflict of the Tatars with the Jin dynasty became a favorable opportunity for Temujin and Tooril Khan to defeat them in alliance with the Jurchens. At this point, Tooril Khan was granted the title Wang (王, Chinese for "king") by the Jin court and since then became known as Wang Khan. By the year 1201, the Taichuud and Jurkhin tribes were defeated and subjugated. Influential aristocrats of many other tribes and confederations were joining Temujin.

In 1201, a crisis ignited in the Keraite khanlig, in which the siblings of Tooril Wang Khan allied with Inancha Khan of Naiman and defeated Tooril. Wang Khan regained power in his kingdom with the support of Temujin. Temujin finally defeated and subjugated the Tatars in 1202. Nilha (childish) Sengum, son of Wang Khan, envied Temujin as his power was growing and persuaded his father to battle against Temujin. This venture led to a victory of Temujin and conquest of the Kereit Khanlyk. Wang Khan escaped alone into the southern deserts of the Naiman khanlig, where he was caught by the Naiman patrols, who killed him irritated as he claimed himself as Wang Khan.

Tayan khan of Naiman and his son Kuchlug initiated a campaign against Temujin in 1204. They allied with Jamukha, who competed with Temujin for the power over the Mongolic tribes. The Naiman troops outnumbered the Temujin's troops. At night at the eve of the battle, Temujin ordered each of his warrior to light ten bonfires, thus deceiving and demoralising Tayan khan, who was a weak warlord. Temujin won the battle. Tayan khan was captured but died of his wound, Kuchlug retreated to the river Irtysh where he was overtaken by Temujin and defeated. After this battle, Kuchlug escaped to Gur-Khan of Kara-Kitai.

As the Khanlyk of Naiman was conquered, Khasar, brother of Temujin, found a dignitary named Tatar-Tonga/Tata Tunga, who spread the Uighur alphabet among the Mongols. This alphabet became the basis of the Classical Mongol script.

By 1206, all the tribes and confederations of Mongolian steppe had come under the leadership of Temujin. The success of Temujin in consolidation of the Mongols was due to his flexibility, his cherishing of his friends and his elaborated tactics. A congress of the Mongol aristocrats on the river Onon in 1206 enthroned Temujin as Chingis Khaan (Genghis Khan) as Emperor of all Mongols.

=== Formation of the Mongol Empire ===
Genghis Khan's conquest

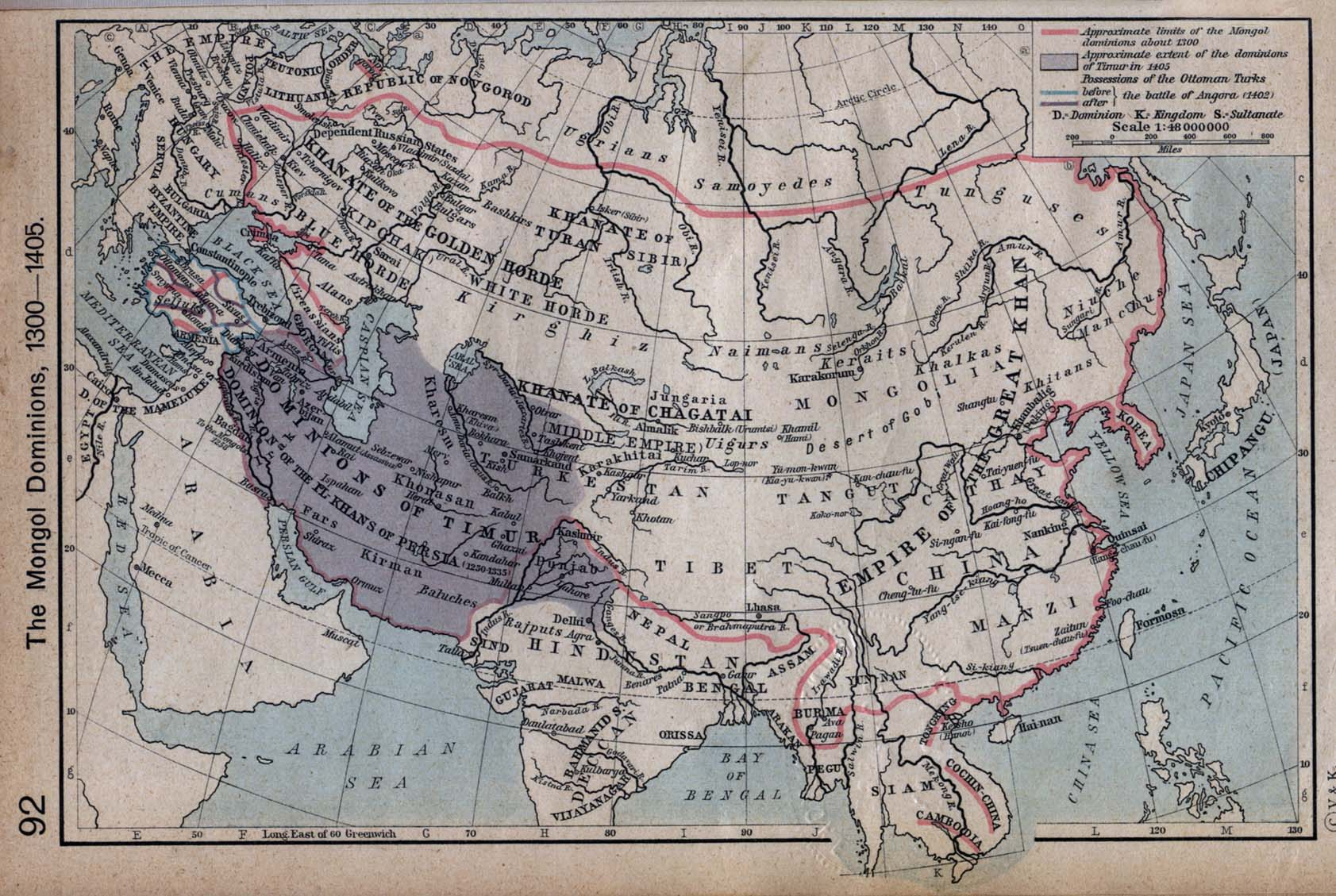
Mongol Empire

The Mongol Empire and the states that emerged from it played a major role in the history of the 13th and 14th centuries. Genghis Khan and his immediate successors conquered nearly all of Asia and European Russia and sent armies as far as central Europe and Southeast Asia.

Genghis Khan abolished the organization of the former tribes and confederations and reformed the country into 95 mingats. In this system, a group of households large enough to mobilize ten warriors was organized into an arbatu, 10 arbatus were organized into a zagutu (100 warriors), 10 zagutus constituted a mingat (1,000 warriors) and 10 mingats constituted a tumetu or tumen (10,000 warriors). This decimal system was a long-tested system that had been inherited from the period of the Xiongnu. With an assumption that each household consisted of four persons and every adult male was a warrior, it can be estimated that the entire population of Mongolia was at least 750,000 people and the nation possessed 95,000 cavalrymen.

The newly unified Great Mongol State became an attractive force for many neighbouring peoples and kingdoms. Beginning from 1207, the Uighur state, Taiga people of the river Yenisey and the Karluk kingdom joined Mongolia. The urgent task of Genghis Khan was strengthening the independence of his young nation. For a century, the southeastern neighbour Jin dynasty had been provoking the Mongolic tribes against one another in order to eventually subjugate them. With a purpose of testing the military strength of his state and preparing for a struggle against the Jin dynasty, Genghis Khan conquered the Tangut-led Western Xia, which pledged vassalage.

In the year, the Mongols, with over 90,000 cavalrymen, started a war with the Jin dynasty which had a multi-million population. At this stage, the Mongols passed over the Great Wall, invaded Shanxi and Shandong provinces, and approached the river Yellow River. The "Altan (Golden) Khaan" (Jin Emperor) surrendered in 1214 and gave Genghis Khan his princess and tribute of gold and silver to his warlords. Genghis Khan gave out to his warriors the tribute of the Jin Emperor loaded on 3000 horses. However, the Jin dynasty continued hostility against Mongolia, hence Genghis Khan ordered his warlord Guo Wang Mukhulai of the Jalair clan to complete the conquest of the Jin dynasty and returned to Mongolia.

Later, the warlord Jebe of Besud clan defeated Kuchulug who had become the Gur-Khan of Qara Khitai. His power was weak as he, a Buddhist, persecuted the indigenous Muslim population.

Genghis Khan intended to develop friendly relations with the Khwarezm Empire, which was on a junction of the trade routes connecting the East and the West and dominated Central Asia, Iran and Afghanistan. Genghis Khan considered himself a supreme ruler of the East and Khwarezm Shah a supreme ruler of the West. Khwarezm Shah had an opposite view that there should be only one ruler on earth as there is only one sun in the sky.

The execution of 450 envoys and tradesmen of Genghis Khan by Khwarezm Shah 1218 was an announcement of war. The Mongol troops invaded Khwarezm Empire in 1219. Although Khwarezm Shah possessed an army outnumbering the Mongol troops dozen of times, he lacked the courage and initiatives to unite his forces and fight back. The Mongol troops sacked cities Otrar, Buhara, Merv and Samarkand. Shah's warlord Temur-Melik led a daring resistance when the Mongol troops besieged city of Khujand. Shah's son Jalal al-Din Mangburni courageously battled with the Mongol army in 1221, but was defeated and escaped to the river Indus.

Pursuing Khwarezm Shah in 1220, the scout groups of warlords Jebe and Subedei bagathur of Uriankhai clan conquered northern Iran. They invaded Iraq, Azerbaijan, Armenia and Georgia in 1221 and entered the territories of the Kipchak Khanate in Crimea and grasslands of the northern Black Sea. The Kipchaks allied with the troops of the principalities of Rus gave battle to the 30,000 cavalrymen of Jebe and Subedei on the river Kalka in May 1223, but were defeated and were chased up to the river Dnieper.

The Western Xia denied its obligation as a vassal state to take part in the western campaign of Genghis Khan. Shortly after returning to Mongolia, the Mongol army invaded the Western Xia in 1226 and conquered the capital Zhongxing (中兴府), located in modern Yinchuan. The Western Xia completely surrendered in March 1227.

Mongolic Khitans and Tuyuhuns or Monguor people (1227) came under rule of the Mongol Empire after its conquest of the Western Xia and Jin dynasties. The Qara Khitai (Western Liao) was conquered by the Mongols under Genghis Khan in 1218.

The 16-year conquests of Genghis Khan resulted in the formation of the Mongol Empire. He died on 16 August 1227 and was buried at site Ihe Ötög on the southern slopes of the Khentii mountain range.

=== Mongol Empire and Pax Mongolica ===
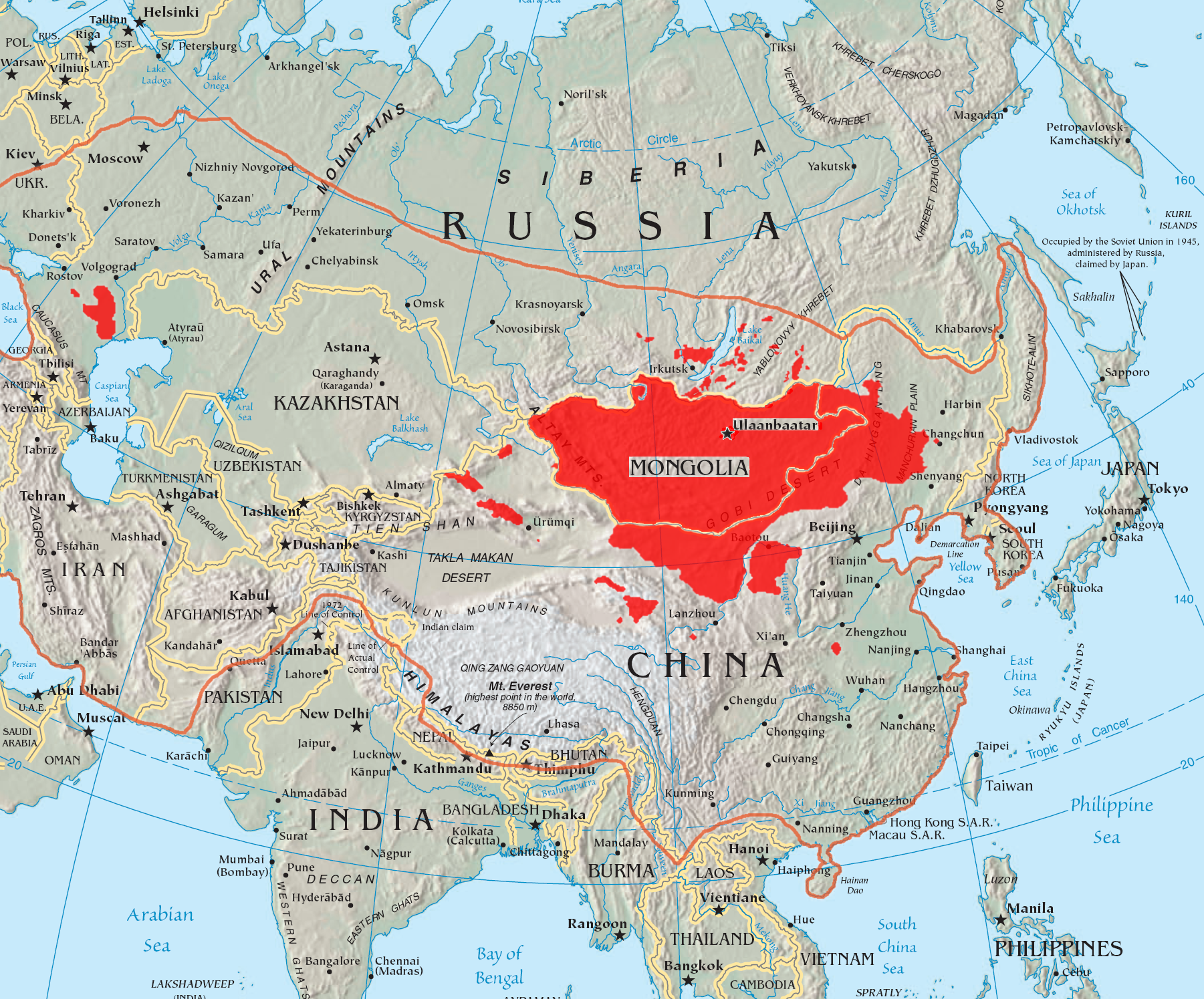
The frontiers of the Mongol Empire on the background of the modern political map and the territories presently populated by Mongols

The 1228 Congress of nobility known as Kurultai enthroned Ogedei, who had been nominated by Genghis Khan. Ogedei Khan made Karakorum on the river Orkhon the capital of the Mongol Empire. Karakorum had been a military garrison of Genghis Khan since 1220. The existence of 12 Buddhist temples, two Muslim mosques and one Christian church in city Karakorum indicates the tolerance of the Mongols to all religions. The construction of the city was supervised by Otchigin, the youngest brother of Genghis Khan. Ogedei Khan established an effective postal yam system with well-organized posts (‘’örtege’’). The system connected the various regions of the whole Empire. Ogedei Khan settled down the rebellions in the countries conquered during his father and led an army himself to put down a revolt in Korea.

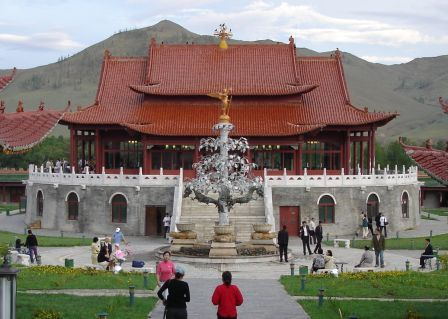
Silver Tree of Karakorum (modern time imitation)

Ogedei Khan completed the conquest of the Jin dynasty in 1231–1234. He sent princes headed by Batu, son of Zuchi, to the west, and they conquered 14 principalities of Rus in 1236–1240, invaded the principalities of Poland, the Kingdom of Hungary, Moravia (then part of the Holy Roman Empire), and the area of Moldavia in 1241–1242 and approached the Adriatic sea.

After his 16-year reign, Ogedei Khan died in 1241 under suspicious circumstances. A rivalry for the throne began between the faction of the houses of Zuchi and Tului on one side and the faction of the houses of Chagatai and Ogedei on the other side. The Kuriltai of 1246 elected Guyug, son of Ogedei, as Great Khan. Guyug Khan died in 1248.

The traveller from Italy Giovanni da Pian del Carpine arrived in 1246 and later he wrote the book Historia Mongolorum quos nos Tartaros appellamus. The faction of Zuchi-Tului houses won the Kuriltai of 1251 electing Mönghe, son of Tului, as Great Khan. Mönghe Khan sent his second younger brother Hulagu to conquer Iran. Hulagu completed the conquest of Iran in 1256 and conquered Baghdad, Caucasus and Syria in 1257–1259. Willem van Ruysbroeck of Flanders arrived in 1254 and later wrote his account Itinerarium fratris Willielmi de Rubruquis de ordine fratrum Minorum, Galli, Anno gratia 1253 ad partes Orientales.

Mönghe Khan died in 1259, without leaving behind a son. The Kuriltai of 1260 elected Ariq Böke, the youngest brother of Mönghe Khan, as Great Khan. The same year, Mönghe Khan's first younger brother Kublai, who was warring in China to conquer the Song dynasty, elevated himself into Great Khan in city Shangdu (or known as Kaiping). The Toluid Civil War was fought between the two brothers from 1261 to 1264 until Ariq Böke surrendered.

The Mongol Empire had an establishing effect on the social, cultural and economic life of the inhabitants of the vast Eurasian territory in the 13th and 14th centuries. It enabled exchange of knowledge, inventions and culture between the West and East. This epoch is called Pax Mongolica.

In Mongolia, the legacy of Genghis Khan was a superior law code, a written language, and a historical pride.

=== Fragmentation of the Mongol Empire and Yuan dynasty ===
Mongol Empire and its fragmentation

The establishment of the Yuan dynasty (1271–1368) by Kublai Khan accelerated the fragmentation of the Mongol Empire. The Mongol Empire fractured into four khanates including the Yuan dynasty based in China, and the three western khanates, i.e. the Golden Horde, the Chagatai Khanate and the Ilkhanate, although later Yuan emperors were seen as the nominal suzerains of the western khanates.

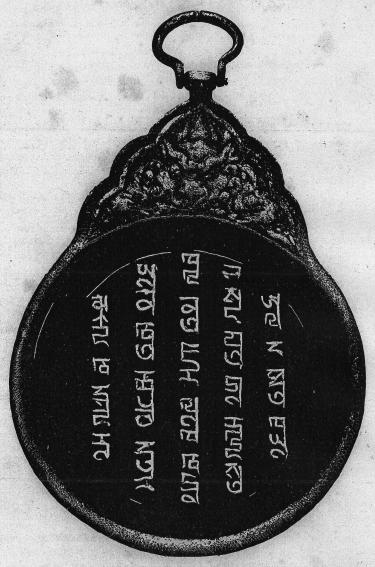
Official pass with 'Phags-pa script

The transition of the capital of the Mongol Empire from Karakorum to Khanbaliq (Dadu, modern-day Beijing) by Kublai Khan in 1264 was opposed by many Mongols. Thus, Ariq Böke's struggle was for keeping the center of the Empire in Mongolia homeland. After Ariq Böke's death, the struggle was continued by Kaidu, a grandson of Ogedei Khan and de facto ruler of the Chagatai Khanate until 1301 as well as lord Nayan in 1287, although the Mongolian steppe was controlled by Kublai Khan and his successors after the Toluid Civil War.

Kublai invited lama Drogön Chögyal Phagpa of Sakya school of Tibetan Buddhism to spread Buddhism throughout his realm (the second introduction of Buddhism among the Mongols). Buddhism became the de facto state religion of the Mongol Yuan state. In 1269, Kublai Khan commissioned Phagpa lama to design a new writing system to unify the writing systems of the multilingual empire. The 'Phags-pa script, also known as the "Square script", was based on the Tibetan script and written vertically from top was designed to write in Mongolian, Tibetan, Chinese, Uighur and Sanskrit languages and served as the official script of the empire.

Kublai Khan announced the establishment of the Yuan dynasty in 1271. The Yuan dynasty included modern-day Mongolia, the territories of the former Jin and Song dynasties and some adjacent territories such as a major part of southern Siberia. Kublai established a government with institutions resembling the ones in earlier Chinese dynasties such as the Zhongshu Sheng to lead the civil administration in the Yuan realm, yet at the same time introduced a hierarchy of reliability by dividing the subjects of the Yuan dynasty into four ranks. The highest rank included the Mongols, the second rank included the peoples to the west of Mongolia, the third rank included the subjects of the former Jin dynasty such as Northern Chinese, the Khitans and Jurchens, and the lowest rank comprised the subjects of the former Song dynasty such as the Han ethnic group in South China.

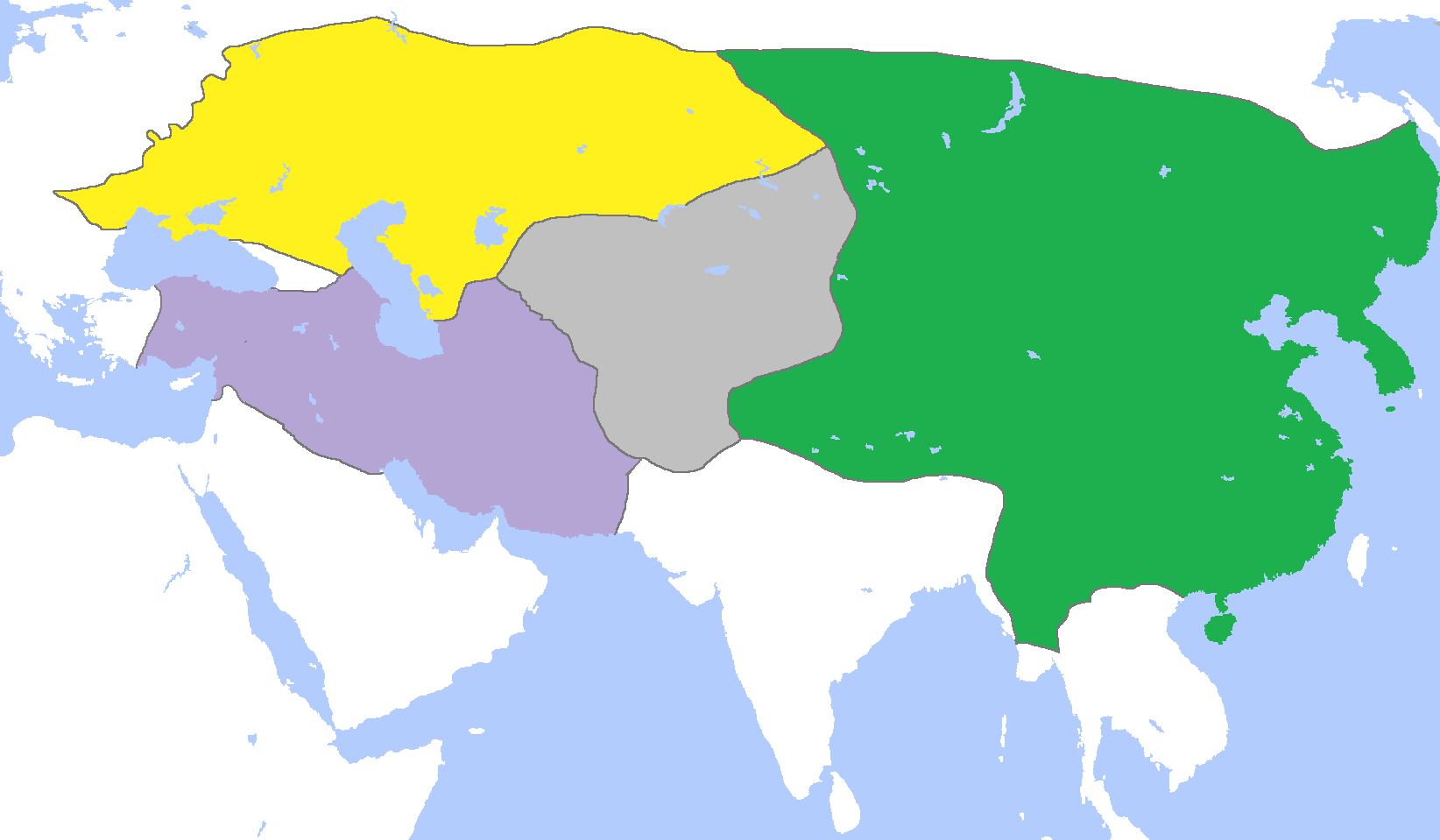
The division of the Mongol Empire, c. 1300, showing the khanates of the Golden Horde (yellow), the Chagatai Khanate (gray), the Yuan dynasty (green) and the Ilkhanate (purple)

As for Mongolia itself, since the Mongolian Plateau is where the ruling Mongols of the Yuan dynasty came from, it enjoyed a somewhat special status during the Mongol-led Yuan dynasty, although the capital of the dynasty had been moved from Karakorum to Khanbaliq (modern Beijing) since the beginning of Kublai Khan's reign, and Mongolia had been turned into a province known as the Lingbei Branch Secretariat by the early 14th century. After the capture of the Yuan capital by the Ming dynasty founded by Han Chinese in 1368, the last Yuan emperor Toghon Temür fled north to Shangdu, then to Yingchang and died there in 1370. The Mongols under his son and successor Biligtü Khan Ayushiridara retreated to the Mongolian steppe and fought against the Ming. The Mongolian steppe became the ruling center of the Northern Yuan dynasty which would last till the 17th century.

=== Northern Yuan and Four Oirat ===
By 1368, the Mongols who established the Yuan dynasty a century ago had been expelled from China proper to the Mongolian Plateau. The Dongxiangs, Bonans, Yugur and Monguor people came under rule of Han-led Ming dynasty. The rump state of the Yuan dynasty after this time until the 17th century is often referred to as the Northern Yuan dynasty, or the Forty and the Four (Дөчин дөрвөн хоёр), meaning the forty Tumens of the Mongols and the four Tumens of the Oirats.

Biligtü Khan Ayushiridara was enthroned in 1370 after the death of the last Yuan emperor. The Ming dynasty founded by ethnic Han began aggressions against the Northern Yuan from the year 1372. Mongol warlord Köke Temür defeated a 150,000 Ming force on the river Orkhon in 1373. Ming army invaded the Northern Yuan again in 1380 and looted Karakorum and other cities, but the invasions of the Northern Yuan by Ming armies in 1381 and 1392 were expelled. Nevertheless, Yuan royalists in Yunnan had surrendered to the Ming dynasty by the early 1380s.

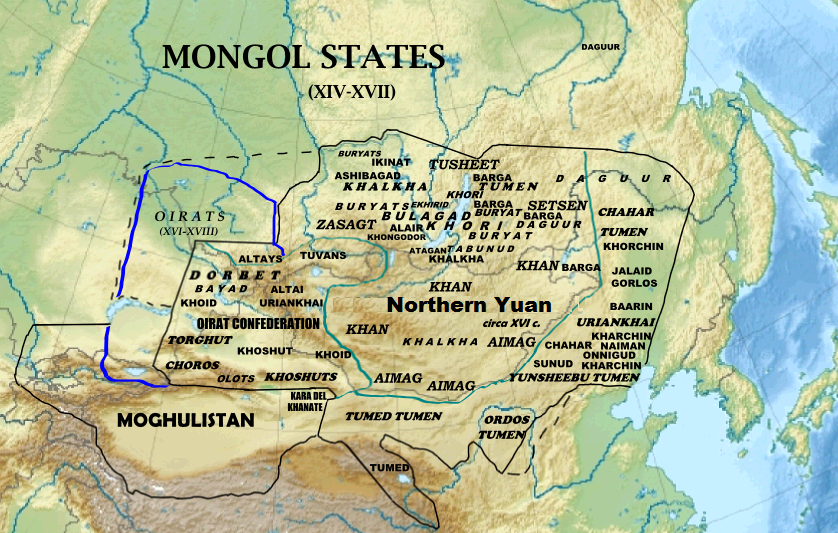
The Northern Yuan at its greatest extent

Naghachu, a Mongol commander of Ayushiridara in Liaoyang province, invaded Liaodong with aims of restoring the Yuan dynasty. However, he, along with his troops (sized about 200,000) finally surrendered to the Ming dynasty in 1387–88 after a successful diplomacy of the latter. In 1388, the Ming dynasty achieved a decisive victory around Buir Lake against Uskhal Khan Tögüs Temür. The defeat of Uskhal Khan effectively shattered Yuan power in the steppes and allowed the Western Oirat Mongols to rise and become the kingmakers of the Northern Yuan realm. In 1388, the Mongol throne was taken over by Jorightu Khan Yesüder, a descendant of Ariq Böke, with the support of the Oirats. He abolished the Han-style title of the former Northern Yuan dynasty.

The Ming dynasty sent Qui Fu's cavalry into Mongolia, but was chased out by Buyanshri Khan (1405–1412). In response, the Yongle Emperor of the Ming dynasty personally invaded the Northern Yuan in 1409, 1414, 1422, 1423, and 1424. Mongols remained powerful even after the fall of the Yuan dynasty but the number of the Mongols decreased due to the fall of the Mongol Empire, wars and assimilation (turkization). As the Ming dynasty understood its own disability of conquering the Mongolian Plateau by military force, it started a policy of provoking the groups of Mongols to quarrel with one another, as well as economic blockade.

A long period of feudal separatism and rivalry for the Khan's throne started in Mongolia by the early 15th century. The military strength of the Mongols during the Yuan dynasty was that they were able to mobilize an army of 400,000 warriors (40 tumens). Assuming that an average household consisted of 4 people and every adult man was a warrior, it can be estimated that the Mongol population in the Yuan dynasty counted at least 1,600,000 people. However, the amount of 40 tumens remained only in the name of the Mongols after the fall of the Yuan dynasty as only 6 tumens were able to retreat to Mongolia and the remaining 34 tumens were lost to the Ming dynasty. These 6 tumens were grouped into the 3 tumens of the left wing ruled by the Mongol Khan and the 3 tumens of the right wing ruled by Jinong, vassal of the Khan. There were about 250,000 Mongols staying in South China and many of these Mongols who were unable to retreat to Mongolia were killed by the Chinese.

The Oirats constituted another 4 tumens. They stayed in Mongolia proper during the Yuan dynasty and sided Ariq Böke, Kaidu and Nayan in their anti-Kublai struggle. By the 15th century the Oirats occupied the Altai Mountains region. The Oirats were ruled by a Taishi who was a vassal of the Khan.

The first half of the 15th century saw a rivalry of Oirat Taishis for the throne of the Khan and the second half of the 15th century saw a separatist movement of the Taishis in the right wing tumens.

In the late 14th century Mongolia was divided into two parts: Western Mongolia (Oirats) and Eastern Mongolia (Khalkha, Southern Mongols, Barga, Buryats).

Western Mongolian Oirats and Eastern Mongolian Khalkhas vied for domination in Mongolia since the 14th century and this conflict weakened Mongolian strength.

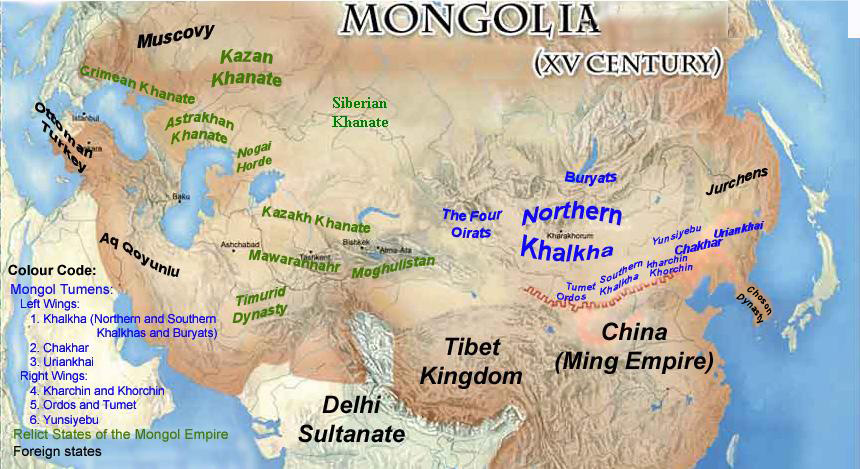
The Turco-Mongol residual states and domains by the 15th century

In 1434, Eastern Mongolian Taisun Khan's (1433–1452) prime minister Western Mongolian Togoon Taish reunited the Mongols after killing Eastern Mongolian another king Adai (Khorchin). Togoon died in 1439 and his son Esen Taish became prime minister. Togoon Taishi of Oirat eventually increased his power in the Northern Yuan court and these achievements were tightened under his successor Esen Taishi. Mongolia was effectively unified under the power of the Oirat Taishi. Esen Taishi led active diplomatic exchanges with the Ming dynasty to achieve favorable trading conditions. When diplomacy failed to reach the goal, he led a military campaign in 1449, in which a 500,000 Ming army was defeated by a 20,000 Oirat army, the Zhengtong Emperor was captured and Beijing was besieged. However, soon after, Esen Taishi was defeated by the Ming dynasty in the Battle of Beijing. Following his defeat, Esen Taishi was expelled beyond the Great Wall and released the Zhengtong Emperor. Shortly after this event Esen Taishi defeated the nominal Khan Togtobuh in their conflict and became a self-declared Khan. During his retreat, Togtobuh was caught and assassinated by his ex-father-in-law for an earlier humiliation of his daughter as she was divorced and returned to her parents. The reign of Esen Taishi was short, less than a year—his rivals rebelled and overthrew him in 1454.

The Khalkha emerged during the reign of Dayan Khan (1479–1543) as one of the six tumens of the Eastern Mongolic peoples. They quickly became the dominant Mongolic clan in Mongolia proper.

Mongolia was once again unified under queen Mandukhai the Wise and Batmönkh Dayan Khan, who subdued the Taishis. Queen Manduhai defeated the Oirats when Batmönkh was still a child. Later Batmönkh subdued the Taishis of the right wings as they refused to accept a suzereign over them—son of Dayan Khan sent there as a Jinong. After this event, Batmönkh moved his residence from Khalkha to Chaharia, to a proxime neighbourhood to the right wings for tighter control over them. Since then, the Mongol Khans resided in Chaharia up to 1634. The left-wing tumens under Dayan Khan were Khalkha, Chaharia and Urianhai, and the right-wing tumens were Ordos/Tümed, Yunshiyebu and Kharchin/Khorchin.

Dayan Khan was succeeded by Bodi Alagh Khan whose power was however assumed by his uncle Bars Bolud Jinong as a regent due to the Khan's young age. As he grew up, Bodi Alagh claimed back his throne and the Jinong yielded.

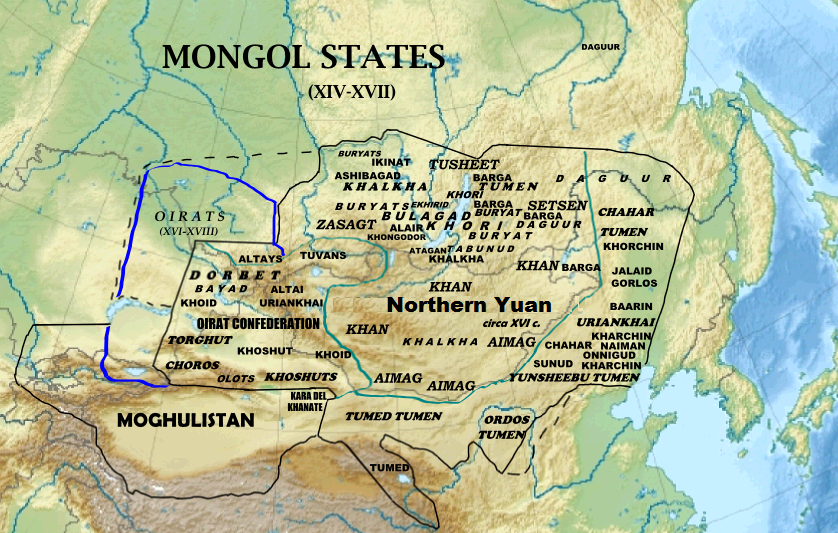
Location of the Four Oirats (Oirat confederation)

The Mongols voluntarily reunified during Eastern Mongolian Tümen Zasagt Khan rule (1558–1592) for last time after the Mongol Empire. During the reign of Darayisung Gödeng Khan and his successor Tümen Jasagtu Khan, the right wings rose in the 16th century under a local lord Altan (son of Bars Bolad Jinong) who assumed the title of khan. In order to maintain the unity of the country by peaceful means, Tümen Jasagtu Khan initiated a representative government with equal participation of the representatives of the left and right wings. The right wings rivaled with the Oirats for possession of Upper Mongolia (Qinghai) and Altan Khan, who appointed his son as a ruler of Upper Mongolia (Kukunor), defeated the Oirats in 1552. Altan Khan attacked the Ming dynasty, but he stopped the raids in 1571, and signed a peace treaty with the Ming court. To achieve favorable conditions in the peace treaty with the Ming dynasty, Altan Khan occasionally threatened that he may ally with Tümen Khan to attack the Ming dynasty. Altan Khan established the city of Hohhot in 1557. Hutuhtai Secen Hongtaiji of Ordos defeated the Torghuts at the river Irtysh around the 1560s.

Abtai Sain Khan, the ruler of Khalkha, conquered the Oirats in the 1570s, but the latter rebelled in 1588. The Oirats, in turn, were busy in struggle with Moghulistan for trade routes.

Tümen Jasagtu Khan was succeeded by Buyan Sechen Khan who claimed having possessed the "seal of the ancient Taizong Khan". Buyan's grandson Ligden ascended the throne in 1603. He initiated translation of major Buddhist scriptures into the Mongolian language. By his time, the authority of the Northern Yuan khan had declined to such a degree that Legdan Hutuhtu Khan came to be known as "Khan of Chaharia". The failure of his attempts of unification of Mongolia by peaceful means led him to shift to forceful methods. However, this in turn alienated the local lords of Inner Mongolia from him even farther.

The striving of the Mongols to improve their life led naturally to an increase in the number of their livestock. In the extensive livestock husbandry, on which the medieval Mongolian economy was based, an excess number of livestock required either expansion of the pastures, which may imply conquest of new territories, or exchange of the excess animals and livestock products for products of settled civilizations unavailable in the unsophisticated Mongolian economy. For example, they would be able to wear clothes made of hides and wool in cold seasons, but would certainly need clothes from silk or light fabric in summer. However, the ban on trade with the Mongols by the Ming administration was a reason for armed conflicts. Moreover, there were frequent attempts to offer low prices for the livestock products or to supply low quality reject goods to the Mongols. Thus in protest, there were cases that Mongol traders burned their reject Chinese purchases in front of the Ming officials during the rule of Esen. Also the Ming administration often issued extremely low import quotas for trade. They banned selling metal products to the Mongols in suspicion that metal would be remoulded into weapons; however, metal products such as kettles were vitally important in the everyday life of the herders.

Cities in Mongolia were completely destroyed during Chinese raids in the late 14th and early 15th centuries. The Ming Empire attempted to invade Mongolia in the 14-16th centuries, however, the Ming Empire was defeated by the Oirat, Southern Mongol, Eastern Mongol and united Mongolian armies. Thus there was no division of labor between urban and rural economies that was characteristic in other cultures. Some attempts of diversification of the economy were undertaken in the 16th and 17th centuries in peripheral Mongol domains but not in Northern Khalkha. Thus Altan Khan made Chinese grow grain around the city of Hohhot. Erdeni Batur Hongtaiji attempted to develop cereal and horticulture production in Dzungaria using imported Kazakhs, Kyrgyz, Chinese and Taranchis. However, these initiatives mainly or exclusively served the ruling classes and the mass of the Mongol commoners received little or no benefit from them.

Mongolia in the first half of the 17th century

By the end of the 16th century, several Khanlig dynasties developed in Khalkha. As Dayan Khan divided Mongolia among his eleven sons, Northern Khalkha (approximately the territory of modern Mongolia) was given to his youngest son Gersenz Hongtaiji and Southern Khalkha was given to Alchibolad. Northern Khalkha was further divided among Gersenz's seven sons and their sons. Abtai, the most powerful of Gersenz's grandchildren, received the title of Khan from the Dalai Lama, and his son Eriyehii Mergen Khan founded the dynasty of the Tushiyetu Khans, who ruled the central heartland of Northern Khalkha. Gersenz's great-grandson Sholoi solicited the title of Khan from Dalai Lama during his visit to Tibet and initiated the dynasty of Secen Khans in the east of Khalkha. Another great-grandson of Gersenz Laihur assumed the title of Khan, and his son Sumbadai founded the dynasty of the Zasagtu Khans, ruling the west of Northern Khalkha. Laihur's cousin Ubashi Hongtaiji separated from the Zasagtu Khan and initiated the dynasty of Altan Khans of Khotgoid. The title Altan Khan was given to him by the Russian authorities.

In the beginning of the 17th century, the Khoshut tribe of Oirat migrated to Kukunor, and Torghuts migrated to the basin of the river Volga, becoming the Kalmyk people. Khara Khula of the Choros clan unified the Oirats by the 1630s, and his son Erdeni Batur Hongtaiji established the Dzungar Khanate in 1634. The title of Hongtaiji was given to him by the Dalai Lama.

==== The third introduction of Buddhism ====
Hutuhtai Secen Hongtaiji of Ordos and his two brothers invaded Tibet in 1566. He sent an ultimatum to some of the ruling clergy of Tibet demanding their submission. The Tibetan supreme monks decided to surrender and Hutuhtai Secen Hongtaiji returned to Ordos with three high ranking monks. Tumen Jasaghtu Khan invited a monk of the Kagyu school in 1576.

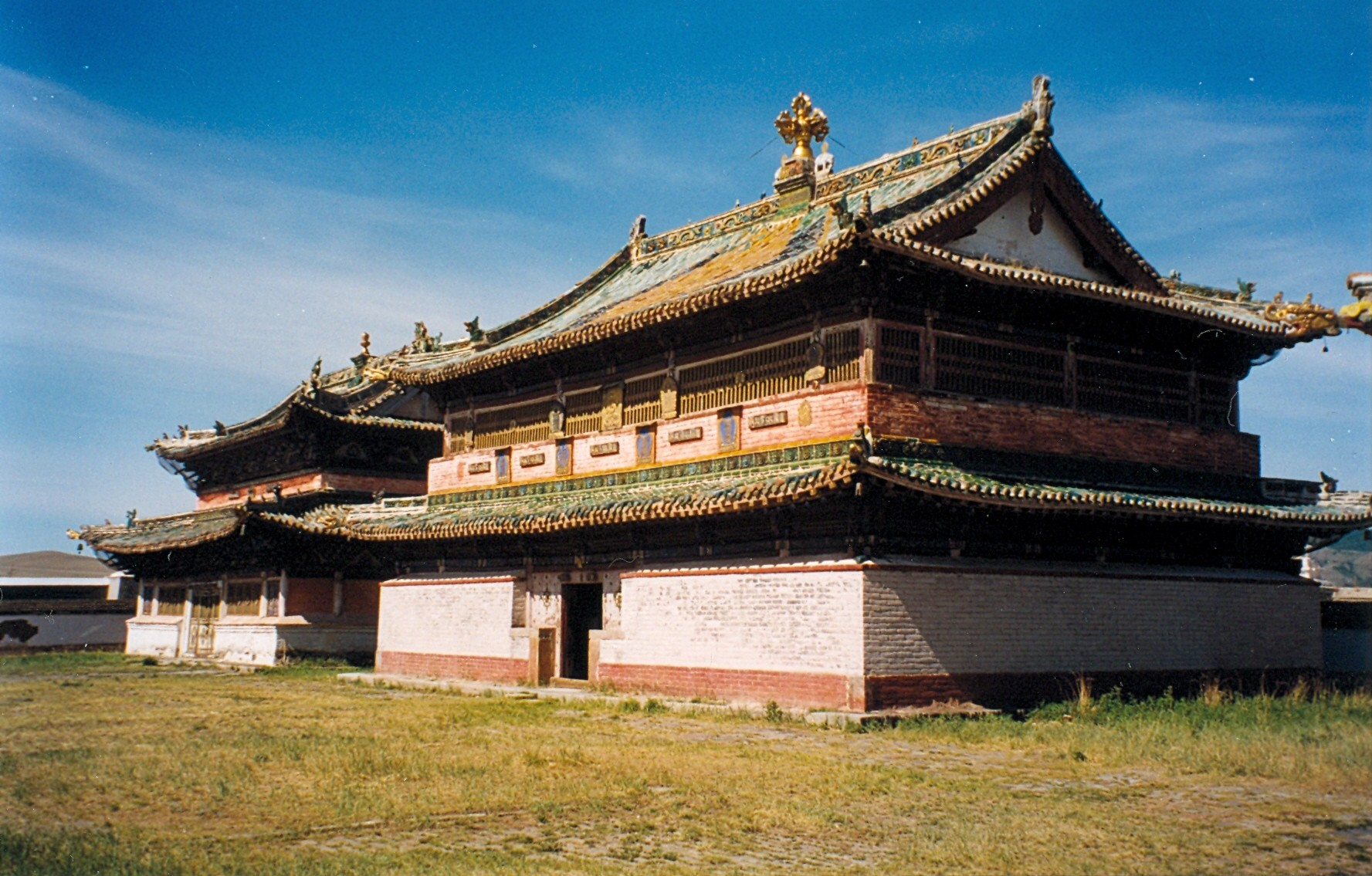
Temple at Erdene Zuu monastery established, by Abtai Khan, in the Khalkha heartland in the 16th century

Following the advice of his nephew Hutuhtai Secen Hongtaiji, Altan Khan of Tumet invited the head of the Gelug school Sonam Gyatso to his domain. Upon their meeting in 1577, Altan Khan recognized Sonam Gyatso lama as a reincarnation of Phagpa lama. Sonam Gyatso, in turn, recognized Altan as a reincarnation of Kublai Khan. Thus, Altan added legitimacy to the title "khan" that he had assumed, while Sonam Gyatso received support for the supremacy he sought over the Tibetan sangha. Since this meeting, the heads of the Gelugpa school became known as Dalai Lamas. Altan Khan also bestowed the title Ochirdara (Очирдар, from Sanskr. Vajradhara) to Sonam Gyatso.

At the same time the ruler of Khalkha Abtai rushed to Tumet to meet the new Dalai Lama. He requested the title Khan from him. Although the new Dalai Lama had already recognized Altan as a Khan in addition to the extant Mongolian Khan Tumen Jasaghtu, the Dalai Lama in Abtai's case rejected the request with the excuse that "there cannot be two Khans at the same time." After some hesitation however, he did give Abtai the title Khan. Abtai Khan established the Erdene Zuu monastery in 1585 at the site of the former city of Karakorum. Thus, eventually most Mongolian rulers became Buddhists.

==== Cultural renaissance ====
The second half of the 15th and the 16th centuries saw the revival and flourishing of Mongolian culture. This period is characterized by development of architecture, fine arts including silk applique, thangka, martang and nagtang painting, and sculpture.
An adopted son of Oirat aristocrat Baibagas, Zaya Pandita Namhaijamtso (1599–1662), reformed the Mongolian script, adapting it to the Oirat dialect. This new script is called Todo bichig.

Zanabazar (1635–1723), head of Buddhism in Khalkha, was a great master of the Buddhist art. Along with the sculptures of the Twenty One Taras, he created the famous sculptures of Sita Tara and Siyama Tara, inspired by lively images of beautiful Mongolian women. The lotus flower over the left shoulder of Sita Tara is about to blossom and Sita Tara herself is in her mid-teens. The lotus flowers over the shoulders of Siyama Tara have already blossomed and Siyama Tara herself is a woman in the bloom of her beauty. She is aware and proud of her perfect beauty. She has awakened from her meditation, put down her right leg in the moment of standing up to descend from her lotus seat to breastfeed her child; and her children are the sentient beings. Many temples and monasteries were built under Zanabazar's projects. He designed the Soyombo script for the Mongolian, Tibetan, and Sanskrit languages in 1686.

Mathematician and astronomer Minggatu of Sharaid discovered nine trigonometric equations and wrote 42 volumes of "The Roots of Regularites" (Зvй тогтлын бvрэн эх сурвалж), 5 volumes in linguistics (дуун ухаан), and 53 volumes of work on mathematics.

In the area of historiography and literature, the Shira Tuuji was written in the 16th century, the Altan Tobchi of Lubsandanzan was written in the first half of the 17th century, and the Erdeniin Tobchi of Sagan Secen Hongtaiji (a descendant of Hutuhtai Secen Hongtaiji), was written in 1662. In the 1620s, Tsogtu Hongtaiji of Khalkha wrote his famous philosophic poems and Legdan Hutuhtu Khan had the 108 volumes of Kangyur and 225 volumes of Tengyur translated into the Mongolian language. A translation theory work, The Source of Wisdom (Мэргэд гарахын орон) was written under leadership of Rolbiidorji, Janjaa Hutuhtu II.

== Qing dynasty ==
=== Qing conquests of Mongolia ===
Territories controlled by independent Mongol polities

In the early 17th century the Northern Yuan dynasty was divided into three parts: the Khalkha, Inner Mongols and Buryats. By the end of the 17th century, the power of the all-Mongolian Khan had greatly weakened and the decentralized Mongols had to face the rising new Jurchen statehood on the east. The last Mongol khagan was Ligdan Khan in the early 17th century. He got into conflicts with the Manchus over the looting of Chinese cities, and managed to alienate most Mongol tribes. In 1618, Ligden signed a treaty with the Ming dynasty to protect their northern border from the Manchus attack in exchange for thousands of taels of silver. Nurhaci Bagatur (Тэнгэрийн сүлдэт) who reunified the Jurchen tribes sent a letter to Ligdan Khan seeking alliance in fighting against the Ming dynasty. Ligdan denied the proposal mentioning that Nurhaci rules only three tumens of the Jurchens while Ligdan himself is a Genghisid ruling the 40 tumens of the Mongols, and that Nurhaci had better refrain from disturbing the Chinese cities-tributaries of him-of Ligdan Khan. In response, Nurhaci held it necessary to remind him that the 40 tumens are long gone and there are perhaps some six tumens of which only Chaharia recognizes Ligdan's power as Khan. Later Nurhaci managed to ally with the vassals of Ligdan Khan, the taijis or princes of Southern Khalkha, Horchin, Horlos, etc., who pledged to support Nurhaci in his wars against the Ming dynasty. However their first allied actions were against their own suzerain Ligdan Khan, who they defeated in 1622.

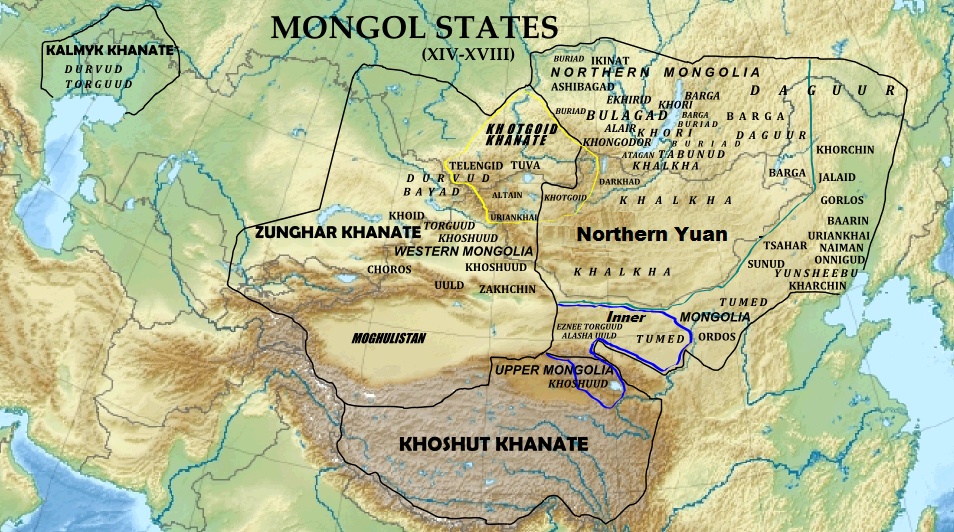
Map of the Dzungar Khanate in Central Asia and Khoshut Khanate in Tibet

By the 1620s, only the Chahars remained under Ligdan's rule. The Chahar army was defeated in 1625 and 1628 by the Inner Mongol and Manchu armies due to Ligdan's faulty tactics.

Ligdan Khan occupied Tumet and Ordos in 1623 to forestall their absorption by the Manchu and advanced into the Manchurian lands in 1631. Nevertheless, Manchu ruler Hong Taiji, successor of Nurhaci, allied with the Inner Mongolian taijis defeated him again in 1634 and sacked Hohhot. The Manchus secured control over Inner Mongolia in 1632 and Ligdan's army moved to fight Tibetan Gelugpa sect (Yellow Hat sect) forces. The Gelugpa forces supported the Manchus, while Ligdan supported the Kagyu sect (Red Hat sect) of Tibetan Buddhism. Ligdan Khan died in 1634 on his way to Tibet when his troops were swept by an epidemic.

Hong Taiji assumed the title of Khan of the Mongols in 1636, marking the conquest of Inner Mongolia. The Qing dynasty, supported by the troops of the Inner Mongolian taijis, conquered Ming dynasty in 1644.

Erdeni Batur Hongtaiji of the Dzungar Khanate convened a congress of Western Mongolian Dzungars and Khalkas in 1640 to ally their forces in struggle against increasing foreign aggression. The congress issued a Khalkha-Oirat Law called the "Great Code of the Forty and the Four" or "Mongol-Oirat Code" (Döchin Dörben Hoyar un Ike Tsagaza). The Congress was attended by 28 rulers from Dzungaria, Khalkha, Kukunor, and Kalmykia. Tushiyetu Khan Gombodorji and Secen Khan Sholoi were engaged in a conflict with the Manchu Qing dynasty siding with Tenggis Taiji of Inner Mongolia who revolted against Qing rule in 1646.

Chahundorji succeeded to Tushiyetu Khan's (Tusheet Khan) throne in 1665. Zasagtu Khan Norbo (Norvo) died in 1661 and rivalry started between his successors. This feud eventually involved Altan Khan, Tushiyetu Khan, and the Dzungar Khanate. The crisis continued for decades and evolved into a war between Khalkha and Dzungaria in 1688, leading to the conquest of Khalkha by Galdan Boshugtu Khan, king of the Dzungar Khanate, in the course of several battles in the Hangai mountains.

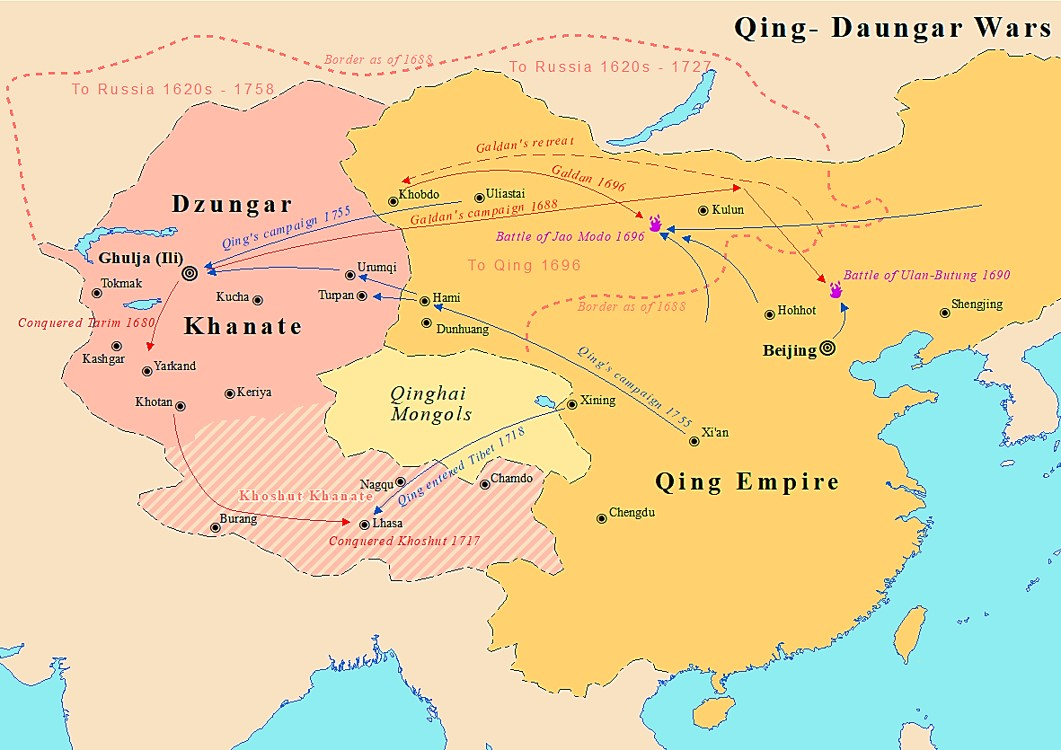
Map showing wars between Qing dynasty and Dzungar Khanate

In 1688, Galdan attacked Khalkha following the murder of his younger brother by Tusheet Khan Chakhundorj (the main or Central Khalkha leader) and the Khalkha-Oirat War began.

The head of the Khalkha Buddhism Boghda Zanabazar, the Khalkha khans and nobles with thousands of their subjects moved in panic to Inner Mongolia, which had been integrated into the Qing dynasty. A few Khalkhas fled north of Outer Mongolia where Russia threatened to exterminate them if they failed to submit, but many submitted to Galdan Boshugtu. The Khalkha leaders sought Manchu aid in their feud with Galdan Boshugtu Khan while the Kangxi Emperor of the Qing dynasty cunningly demanded that they become his vassals as a condition for his support. Galdan demanded that the Kangxi Emperor cede him Önder Gegeen Zanagazar and Tushiyetu Khan Chahundorji. The Kangxi Emperor refused and decisive battle took place near UlaanBudan where Galdan was defeated and fled back deeper into Khalkha territory.

The Dzungar throne was then seized by Galdan's brother, Tsewang Rabtan in 1689 while the latter was engaged in the war in Khalkha and this event made it impossible for Galdan to fight the Qing Empire. Galdan sent his army to "liberate" Inner Mongolia after defeating the Khalkha army and called Inner Mongolian nobles to fight for Mongolian independence. Some Inner Mongolian nobles, Tibetans, Kumul Khanate and some Moghulistan's nobles supported his war against the Qing Empire, however, Inner Mongolian nobles did not join the battle against the Manchus.

The Kangxi Emperor organized a congress of the rulers of Khalkha and Inner Mongolia in Dolnuur in 1691 at which the Khalkha feudatories (the Khalkha Khanate or Eastern Mongolia) by Zanabazar's decision formally declared allegiance to the emperor. However, Khalkha de facto remained under the rule of Galdan Boshugtu Khan. Chakhundorj fought against the Russian invasion of northern Mongolia until 1688. Zanabazar struggled to bring together the Oirats and Khalkhas before the war. Qing forces invaded Khalkha in 1696 and the Oirats were defeated by the outnumbering enemy in a battle at Zuun Mod at the river Terelj. Galdan Boshugtu Khan died in 1697 in the region of Kovd.

There were three khans in Khalkha of which Zasagt Khan Shar (Western Khalkha leader) was Galdan's ally. Tsetsen Khan (Eastern Khalkha leader) did not engage in this conflict. The Mongols who fled to Outer and Inner Mongolia returned after the war. Some Khalkhas mixed with the Buryats. Tsewang Rabtan continued the war against the Manchus to liberate Eastern, Upper and Inner Mongolia after Galdan Boshugtu, however, his action against Galdan made northern Mongols fight against Russia without the help of other Mongols. The Russian and Qing Empires supported his actions because this coup weakened Western Mongolian strength.

Mongolia encountered Russian expansion on her northern border in the 17th century. The Buryats had fought against Russian invasion since the 1620s. The well-armed Russian Cossacks cruelly subdued the resistance of the Buryats and conquered the Baikal region in 1640-1650s. The uprisings of the Buryats were brutally crushed in 1658 and 1696. The Russians attempted to build ostrogs in Khövsgöl area, but they were quickly destroyed by the local population. The Buryat region was formally annexed to Russia by treaties in 1689 and 1727, when the territories on both the sides of Lake Baikal were separated from Mongolia. In 1689 the Treaty of Nerchinsk established the northern border of Manchuria north of the present line. The Russians retained Trans-Baikalia between Lake Baikal and the Argun River north of Mongolia. The Treaty of Kyakhta (1727), along with the Treaty of Nerchinsk, regulated the relations between Imperial Russia and the Qing Empire until the mid nineteenth century. It established the northern border of Mongolia. Oka Buryats revolted in 1767 and Russia completely conquered the Buryat region in the late 18th century.

Teswang Rabtan stopped the eastern expansion of the Kazakh khans, and also sent his general Ihe Tserendondov to conquer Tibet in 1716. His force was driven out by Qing troops in 1720, who then occupied Tibet. However, several attempts by the Qing dynasty to subjugate the Dzungar Khanate failed in the early 18th century. In 1723, the Qing troops subdued the uprising of Luvsandanzan taiji in Kukunor. Tsewang Rabtan was succeeded by his son Galdan Tseren in 1727.

Galdan Tseren took a series of actions to develop of crop production, gardening, and cannon manufacture in Dzungaria. He successfully repelled the aggression of the Qing dynasty in 1729–31. Moreover, his general Baga Tserendondov advanced into Khalkha and reached the River Kerulen in 1732, but had to retreat after battles with Khalkha and Qing troops. Galdan Tseren died in 1745 and a crisis arose among his heirs. After a series of bloody clashes among them, Dawachi, supported by Khoi-Oirat prince Amursana became the new Dzungar Khan in 1753. The feud was a sign to the Qing dynasty to prepare for the invasion of the Dzungar Khanate.

As soon as he became Khan, Dawachi deprived his friend Amursana of his wife and then defeated him in a battle in 1754. Amursana sought an alliance with the Qing dynasty, hoping to defeat Dawachi and elevate himself to the position of Khan of the Dzungar Khanate. The Qing administration mobilized horses and other livestock of the Khalkha population for the Dzungar invasion. A 200,000 strong army consisting of Khalkha, Inner Mongolian, Manchu and Chinese troops invaded Dzungaria in 1755. The vanguard of the Qing army was led by Amursana, king Chingünjav and King Renchindorji of the Khalkhas. The Dzungar Khanate was conquered by the Manchus in 1755–1758 due to conflicts between their leaders and military commanders.

While this horde entered the Ili River Basin, Amursana captured Davaachi and handed him to the Manchu. This event marked the fall of the Dzungar Khanate, which had impeded Qing expansion into Central Asia for over a century. The Qianlong Emperor demobilized the army and envisaged a congress of Dzungar and other Mongol aristocrats to celebrate the incorporation of Dzungaria into the Qing Empire.

Soon after the conquest of the Dzungar Khanate, Amursana, Chingünjav of Khotogoid and Inner Mongolian Khorchin Wang Sevdenbaljir rose up against Qing domination. Some Inner Mongol and Khalkha nobles supported this uprising but the second Jebtsundamba Khutughtu and Tushiyetu Khan Yampildorji mysteriously died shortly afterwards.

The Qing Empire in 1820; Inner and Outer Mongolia became a part of the empire between 1636 and 1697.

Chingünjav rose against Qing rule in 1756 abandoning his post and appealed to the other nobles of Khalkha to rise for independence. Around the same period, an uprising of Sevdenbaljir in Inner Mongolia was subdued. Sevdenbaljir was arrested before this uprising to prevent the Inner Mongols uniting their force. He planned to organize a congress of the Khalkha nobility to elect a future Khan of Mongolia. Chingunjav was supported by Boghda Gegeen II, the Khans of the four Khalkha aimags and other members of the nobility. However, the Qing court was able to capture Chingunjav before the uprising took its full swing. Chingunjav and his whole family were cruelly executed in 1757, and the Qing court decided that future Jebtsundamba Khutughtus would be only found in Tibet, not in Mongolia. Renchindorj Wang who allowed Amursanaa to abandon his post in the Qing army was cruelly executed in Beijing.

Amursanaa returned to Dzungaria with his 500 warriors as he was deceived in his hope to take the Dzungar throne with the support of the Qing Empire. A faction of the Oirat aristocrats elevated him as Khan of the Oirats in 1756. However, Amursana's followers lacked unity. The decisive battle took place at Sharbal in 1757 when 3,000 Oirat troops fought against a four times outnumbering enemy. After the 17-day battle, Amursana was defeated and fled to Tobolsk in Russia where he died but the Dzungars continued their war against Manchu invasion until 1758. Brutally revenging the Oirat people for their love for freedom, the Qing army carried out the Dzungar genocide, killing every Oirat they met on their way in the territory of the Dzungar Khanate. Of the 600,000 Dzungar population, only 30 thousand survived. Some scholars estimate that about 80% of the Dzungar population were destroyed by a combination of warfare and disease during the Qing conquest of the Dzungar Khanate in 1755–1758. Mark Levene, a historian whose recent research interests focus on genocide, has stated that the extermination of the Dzungars was "arguably the eighteenth century genocide par excellence." The territory of the Dzungar Khanate was then incorporated into the Qing Empire as Xinjiang, which later became a province.

=== Mongolia under Qing rule ===
Mongolia in 1911

After seizing control of Outer Mongolia, the Qing government grouped Khalkha khoshuns into 4 aimags (province): Tusiyetu Khan aimag, Zasaghtu Khan aimag, Secen Khan aimag and Sain Noyan Khan aimag. In addition, the territories populated by Oirats in the Kobdo region were grouped into Togs Huleg Dalai Khan aimag and Unen Zorigtu Khan aimag. Aimags were governed by aimag congress chigulgan comprising the lords of the khoshuns. The chigulgan daruga (чуулган дарга - official presiding the congress) was appointed from the khoshun lords by the Qing government.

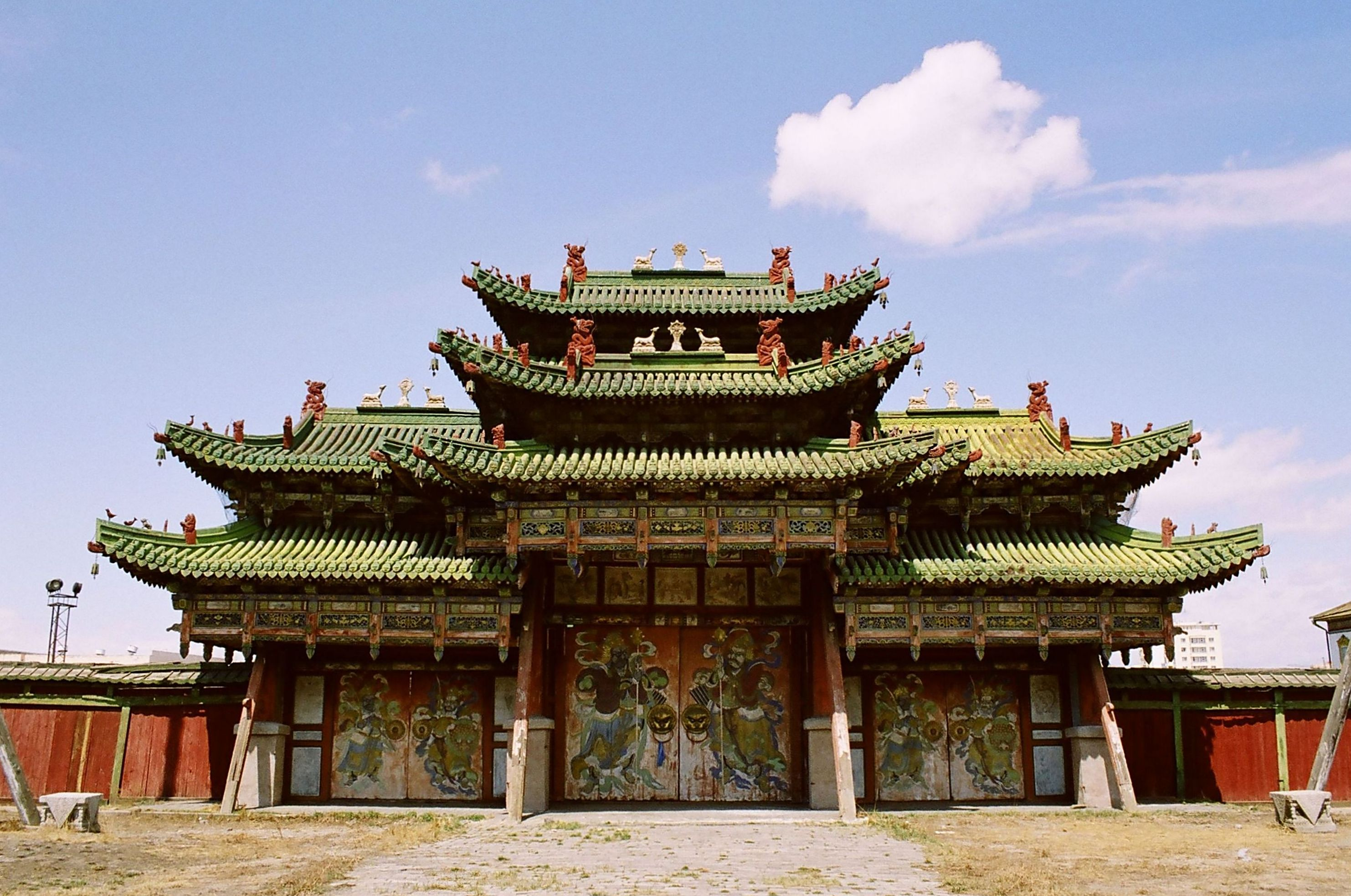
Winter Palace of 8th Jebtsundamba Khutuktu

As vassals of Qing Emperors, the Mongolian nobles—rulers of the khoshuns were expected to carry out military services commanding their troops in warfare, to personally attend the Emperor in his hunting processions, mobilize resources from the khoshun population and subdue local riots. Their services were generously awarded by the Emperor, and those who performed exceptionally outstanding feats before the Qing Emperor would occasionally be honoured to marry a princess. Disobedience or failure to provide adequate service was severely punished.

The most heavy burden of the foreign exploitation was laid on the spine of the ordinary Mongolian laborers. They were impoverished during mobilization of horses and livestock products during preparation of the military campaign against the Dzungar Khanate besides they had to serve as warriors themselves. Although the military feudal system of Mongolia of the pre-Qing epoch is considered to have been a class society in which an ordinary Mongol was expected to obey his feudal lord as a soldier obeys a commander, it was during the Qing rule when serfdom was effectively introduced to the Mongolian society for the first time. There were 3 forms of serfdom: albatu—state serfs, khamjilga—personal serfs of khoshun rulers and of taijis, and shabi—serfs of Khutuhtus, supreme clergy. To prevent assimilation of the Mongols, the Qing government tried to restrict travels of Han Chinese to Khalkha and to forbid cross-ethnic marriages between the Mongols and Han Chinese. In the later Qing period however, the Qing policy changed with the "New Policies" (Xin zheng) in the early 20th century, which called for the sinification of Mongolia through Han Chinese colonisation.

== Modern period ==
=== Bogd Khanate (1911–1919) ===
The official name of the state was "Ikh Mongol Uls", meaning the "Great Mongolian State". Yuan Shikai, the President of the newly formed Republic of China considered the new republic to be the successor of the Qing and claimed Outer Mongolia as part of its territory. This claim was legally provided for in the Imperial Edict of the Abdication of the Qing Emperor signed by the Empress Dowager Longyu on behalf of the six-year-old Xuantong Emperor: "[...] the continued territorial integrity of the lands of the five races, Manchu, Han, Mongol, Hui, and Tibetan into one great Republic of China" ([...] 仍合滿、漢、蒙、回、藏五族完全領土，為一大中華民國). The Provisional Constitution of the Republic of China adopted in 1912 specifically established frontier regions of the new republic, including Outer Mongolia, as integral parts of the state. While the Qing referred to their state as Zhongguo (the term for "China" in modern Chinese) in official documents such as treaties, it implemented different ways of legitimization for different peoples in the Qing Empire, such as acting as Khan to the Mongols. As a result, the Mongols considered themselves as subjects of the Qing state outside China or Khitad, and the position of Mongols was that their allegiance had been to the Qing monarch, not the Chinese state. When declaring its independence the Mongolian government led by the Bogd Khan posited to Yuan Shikai that both Mongolia and China had been administered by the Manchus, but after the fall of the Manchu-led Qing dynasty in 1911 it was simply that the contract about their submission to the Manchus had become invalid.

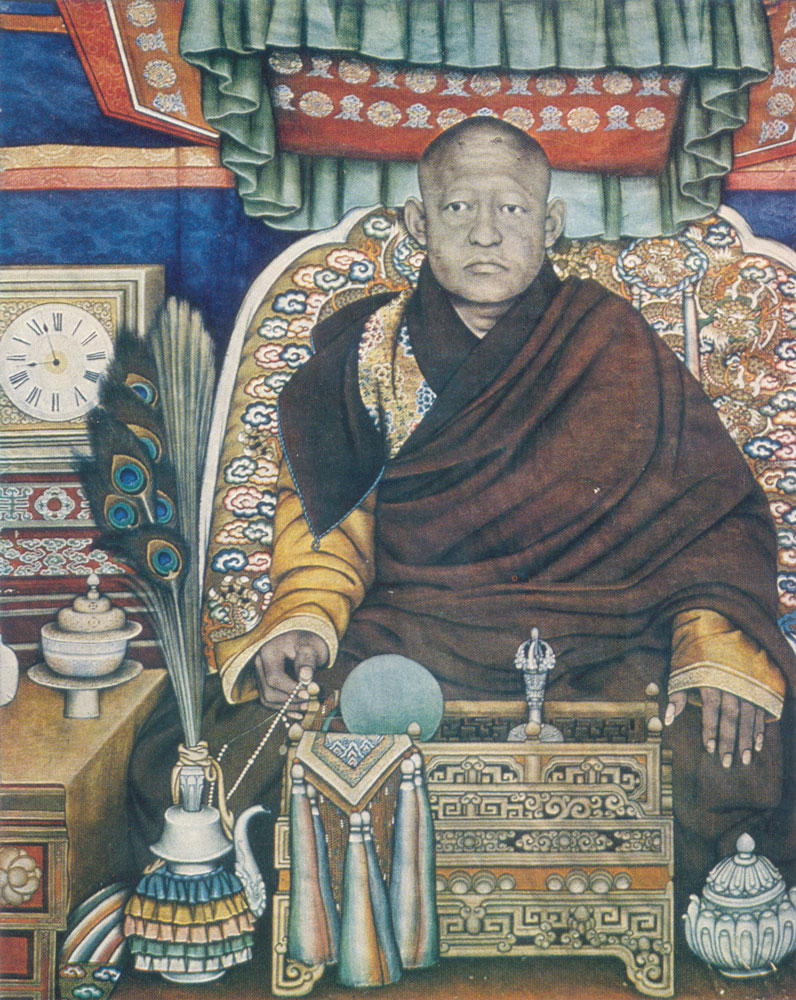
Portrait of the Bogd Khan by B.Sharav (1924)

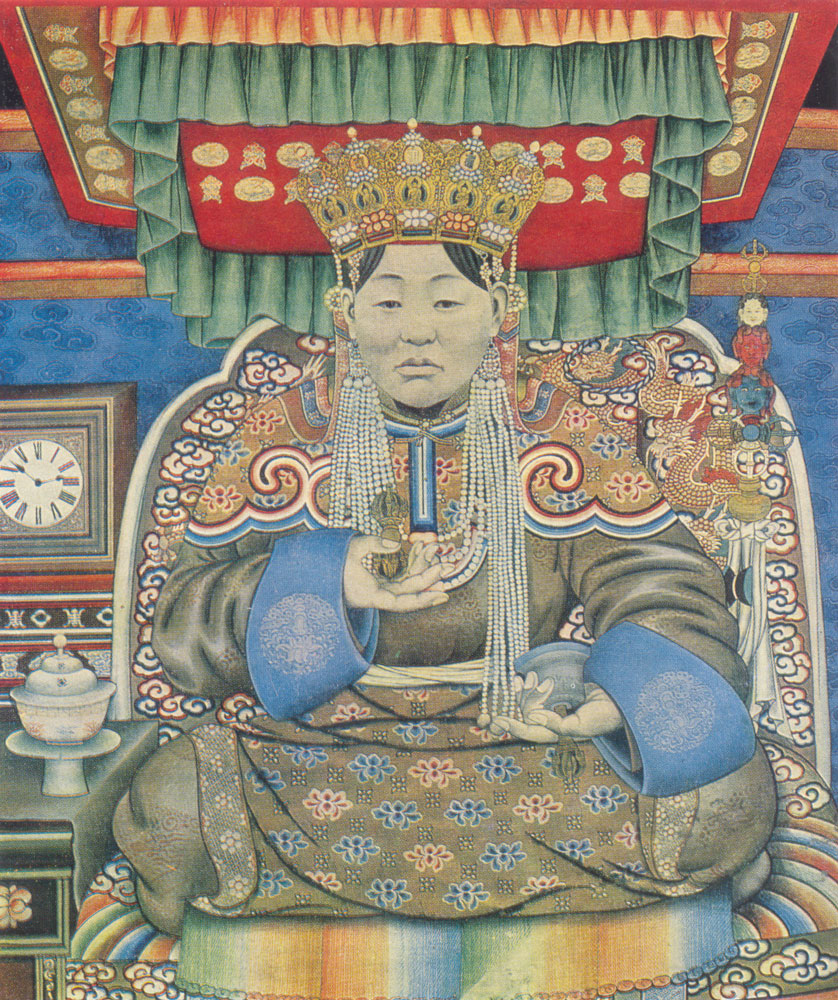
Portrait of Tsendiin Dondogdulam, the queen consort of the Bogd Khan, by B.Sharav (1924)

Bogd Gegeen was enthroned as Bogd Khaan (Holy King) of Mongolia on 29 December 1911 and a new era name, Olan-a Örgugdegsen (共戴; Gòngdài; lit. "Elevated by Many"), was declared. The Qing high official in Uliastai was deported on 12 January 1912 in the presence of 700 Mongolian warriors mobilized from Sain Noyan Khan aimag. Mongolian troops led by Danbijantsan (Ja Lama), Magsarjav, and the Manlaibaatar Damdinsüren arrived in the Khovd region in August 1912. After an intense attack supported by the local people, they captured the city of Kobdo during the night of 20 August 1912. At the same time, while many Mongol leaders outside Outer Mongolia sent statements to support Bogd Khan's call of Mongolian reunification, in reality however, most of them were too prudent or irresolute to attempt joining the Bogd Khan regime.

The Mongolian army took control of Khalkha and the Khovd region (modern Uvs Province, Khovd Province, and Bayan-Ölgii Province) but Northern Xinjiang (the Altai and Ili regions of the Qing Empire), Upper Mongolia, Barga, and Inner Mongolia came under control of the Republic of China. On 2 February 1913 the Bogd sent Mongolian cavalrymen to "liberate" Inner Mongolia from China. The Russian Empire refused to sell weapons to the Bogd Khanate, and Tsar Nicholas II called it "Mongolian imperialism". The United Kingdom urged Russia to abolish Mongolian independence because it was concerned that "if Mongolians gain independence then Central Asians will revolt".

The Barga Mongols fought against Chinese forces in August 1912, captured the city of Hailar, and announced their willingness to unify with the Bogd Khaanate.

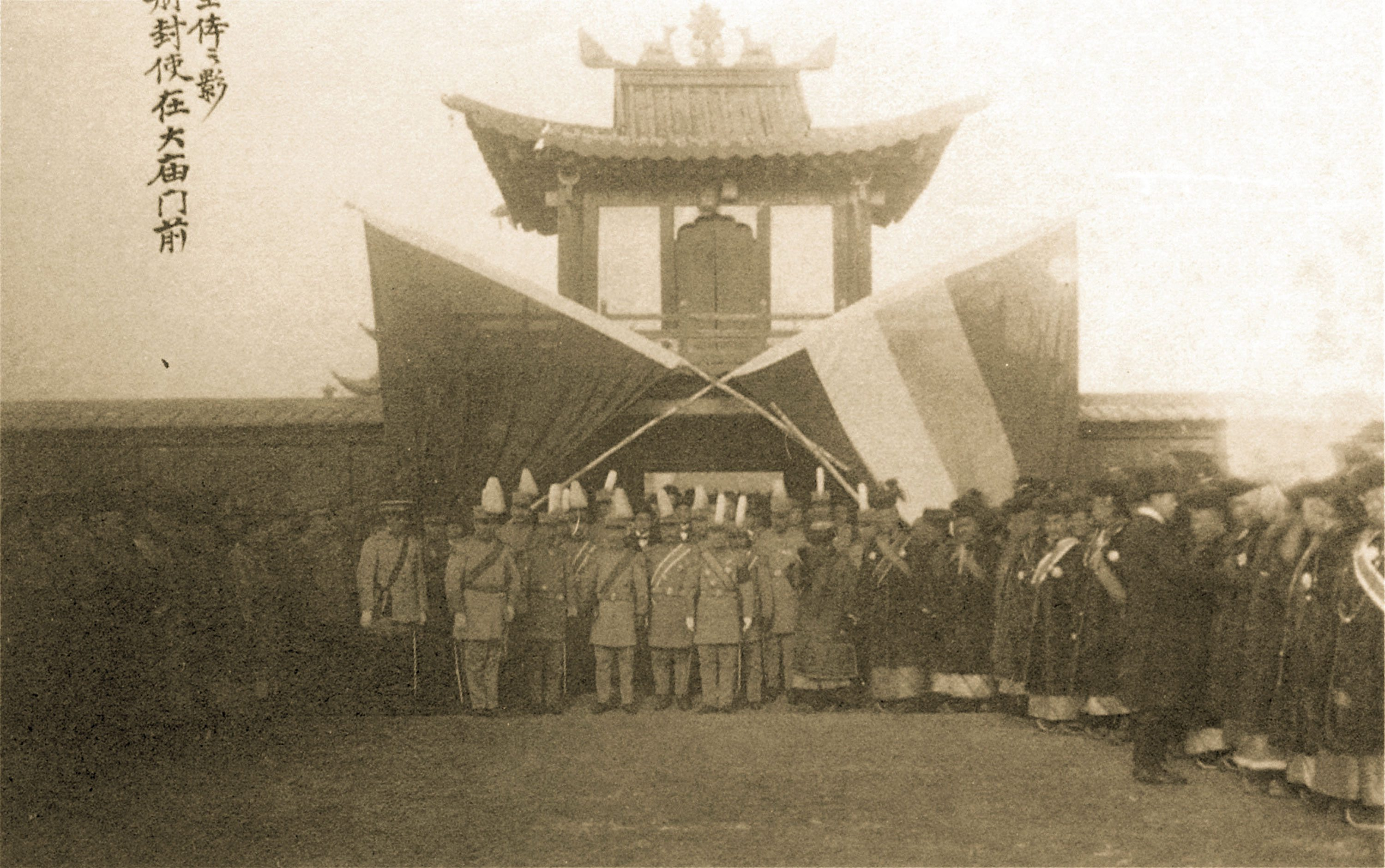
Chinese warlords and Mongolian Noyans in the ceremony celebrating the canonization of 8th Jebtsundamba

With national independence, Mongolia entered the path of modernization. A parliamentary structure consisting of two chambers, the Upper Hural and the Lower Hural, was formed in 1914. A legal code, Jarlig yar togtughaghsan Mongol Ulus un hauli zuil-un bichig (or Zarligaar togtooson Mongol Ulsyn khuuli zuiliin bichig), was adopted in 1915.

On 3 November 1912, the Russian Empire and Mongolia signed a bilateral treaty without the participation of China. This treaty meant recognition of the Bogd Khaan as the monarch of the sovereign "State of Mongolia" by Russia. Nevertheless, under strong pressure from the Russian and Chinese governments, the Treaty of Kyakhta (1915) between Russia, Mongolia, and the Republic of China "downgraded" the independence of Outer Mongolia to autonomy within China. The government of Mongolia maintained a position of preserving Mongolia's independence including Khalkha Mongolia, the Khovd region, Western Mongolia, Tuva, Inner Mongolia, Barga, and Upper Mongolia. The position of the Republic of China was that all of Mongolia was territories of China. The position of Russia was to reduce Mongolian independence to an autonomy limited to Outer Mongolia only. Negotiations continued for eight months as the Mongolian representatives firmly defended the independence of the country, but finally the government of Mongolia had to accept Russia's position. However, Outer Mongolia remained effectively outside the control of the Chinese, who on the other hand controlled Barga, Dzungaria, Tuva, Upper Mongolia, and Inner Mongolia in 1915.

On 2 February 1913, Mongolia and Tibet signed a treaty of friendship and alliance.

=== Chinese territory (1919–1921) ===
Following the Russian Revolution of October 1917, China revived its claims to Outer Mongolia, aiming at its conversion into a common Chinese province. In late 1919, the Chinese general Xu Shuzheng occupied Urga after suspicious deaths of Mongolian patriotic nobles and forced the Bogd Khaan and the leading nobles to sign a document renouncing Mongolia's independence. Leaders of Mongolia's national independence movement, such as Magsarjav and Damdinsüren, were arrested, imprisoned, and even tortured to death. The Chinese had tightened their control of Mongolia by this time.

Russian White Guard troops led by Baron von Ungern-Sternberg, who had been defeated in the Civil War in Transbaikalian Siberia, invaded Mongolia in October 1920. Baron Ungern sought allies to defeat the Bolsheviks. In October–November 1920, Ungern's troops assaulted the capital, Niislel Khuree, known to Europeans under the name Urga (now Ulaanbaatar), several times but were repelled with heavy losses. Ungern entered contacts with Mongolian nobles and lamas and received Bogd Khaan's edict to regain independence. On 2–5 February 1921, after fighting a huge battle, Ungern's force drove the Chinese forces out of the Mongolian capital.

One part of the Chinese forces fled to the south to China, and another to the north of Mongolia to enter negotiations with the Far Eastern Republic. The Bogd Khaan's monarchic power and his government were briefly restored.

=== Mongolian People's Republic (1921–1992) ===
Bogd Khan failed in his efforts to get aid from Japan and the United States for regaining the independence of Mongolia from China. Later the Chinese forces were defeated by Baron Ungern, but at the same time the Mongolian People's Party (MPP) had been established. The Soviet government saw this party as instrumental for driving Ungern's troops from Mongolia.

The MPP was established in early 1921 as a merger of two underground revolutionary groups who had their own views on the future of Mongolia. One of these groups was headed by Soliin Danzan, and the other group was headed by Dogsomyn Bodoo. They sought aid from the Soviet Union, which was unacceptable to Bogd Khan. However, for the sake of the country's independence, Bogd Khan endorsed the MPP's letter to the Soviet government. However, the Soviet Union chose not to respond to Bogd Khan's government, instead looking to the MPP to become the rulers of Mongolia.

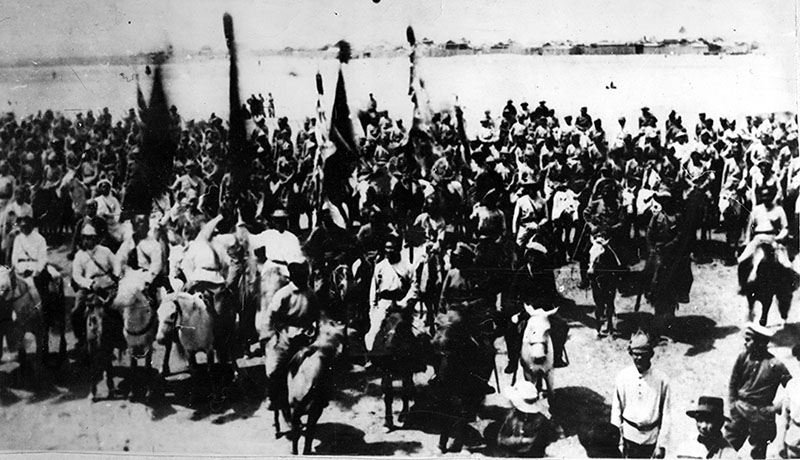
The Mongolian People's Militia entering Niislel Khüree in July 1921

The Mongolian Revolution of 1921 began on 18 March, when 400 volunteer troops led by commander Damdin Sükhbaatar attacked the 2,000-man Chinese garrison in Kyakhta at the northern frontier of Mongolia. The Mongolian volunteer troops (People's Militia) and units of the Soviet Red Army advanced to the south, annihilating the remainder of the defeated Chinese troops and Ungern's forces. The main battles undertaken by the Mongolian troops took place at Tujiin Nars against the Chinese and at Zelter and Bulnai against the White troops. Simultaneously, Khatanbaatar Magsarjav, who had been sent by Baron Ungern to the Western provinces, revolted and allied himself with the MPP. He defeated the White troops led by Kazantsev, Vandanov, and Bakich. Mongolian and Soviet troops led by Khasbaatar and Baikalov withstood a long encirclement by the Whites at Tolbo Lake (in present-day Bayan-Ölgii). Baron Ungern, after a conspiracy, was deserted by his troops and captured by a detachment of the Red Army.

Mongolian and Soviet forces entered Urga in July 1921. The victory of the revolution and a people's government was proclaimed with the adoption of the Statement of Reunification of Mongolia on 11 July 1921. By 1922, Chinese and White Russian military presence were fully expelled from the country.

On the eve of the 1921 revolution, Mongolia had an underdeveloped and stagnant economy based on a nomadic form and an interest in animal husbandry. Agriculture and industry were almost non-existent; transport and communications were primitive; banking, services and trade were almost exclusively in the hands of Chinese or other foreigners. Most people were nomadic herders illiterate, and much of the male labour force lived in the monasteries, with little economic contribution. Property in the form of livestock belonged mainly to aristocrats and monasteries; ownership of the remaining sectors of the economy was dominated by Chinese or other foreigners.

In 1924, during secret meetings with the Republic of China, the Soviet Union agreed to China's claim to Mongolia. The Soviet Union officially recognized Mongolian independence in 1945.

The revolutionary government kept Bogd Khan as nominal head of state, but the actual power was in the hands of the MPP and its Soviet counselors. After the mysterious death of Bogd Khan in 1924, the MPP moved quickly to promulgate a Soviet-style constitution, abolishing the monarchy and declaring the Mongolian People's Republic (MPR) on 26 November 1924. The same year, the MPP was renamed to the Mongolian People's Revolutionary Party (MPRP).

With the emergence of leftist leaders in 1928, waves of Soviet-inspired anti-religious campaigns, collectivization efforts, nationalization and confiscation of estates were implemented between 1928 and 1932. The new policies and campaign coincided with Soviet leader Joseph Stalin's collectivization and anti-religious campaign. However, the Soviet-backed policies led to an economic breakdown and a widespread unrest and armed uprisings in 1932. The rebels were defeated by Mongolian and Soviet troops in October 1932.

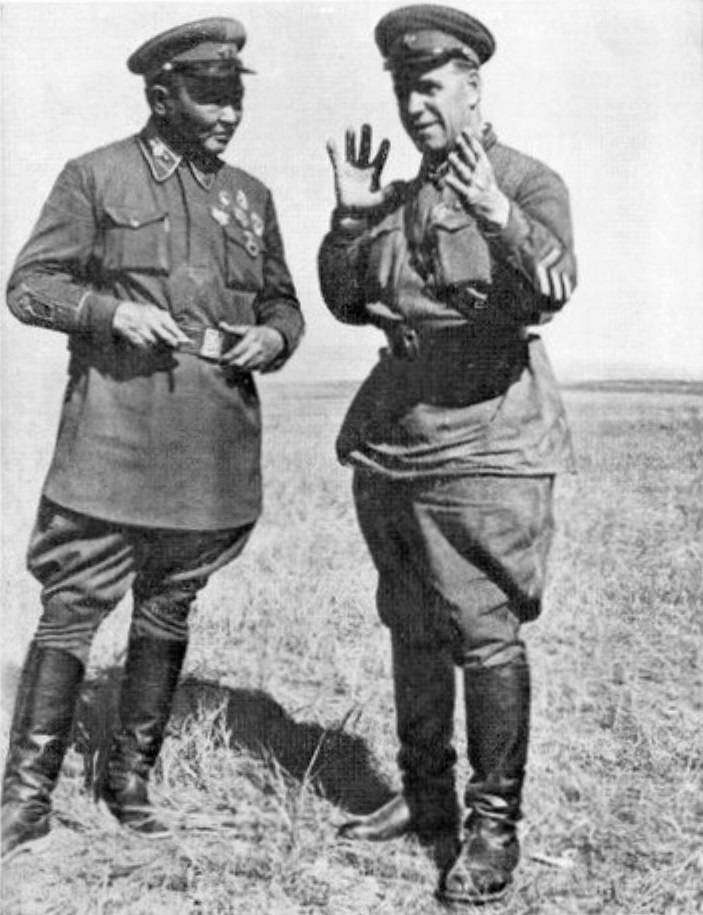
Khorloogiin Choibalsan, leader of the Mongolian People's Republic (left), and Georgy Zhukov consult during the Battle of Khalkhin Gol against Japanese troops, 1939.

As a result, the MPRP withdrew its aggressive socialist policies, as advised by the Comintern, instead adopting the Шинэ эргэлтийн бодлого (Shine ergeltiin boglogo, lit. "New Turn Policy"). The New Turn included the purging of the most leftist members of the leadership under the pretext of нугалаа (nugalaa "bending") and liberalized development of the economy, and was favored by new leaders such as prime minister Peljidiin Genden. However, the policy was effectively a temporary tactical retreat by Stalin and the Comintern. Another wave of repressions began in 1937, presided over by Khorloogiin Choibalsan, and resulted in the almost complete elimination of the Buddhist clergy. Buryat Mongols started to migrate to Mongolia in the 1900s due to Soviet oppression. Stalin stopped the migration in 1930 and initiated repressions in Mongolia against both immigrants and native Mongolians. During the Great Repression, orchestrated by Choibalsan, many Buryat men and 22,000–33,000 Mongols were killed by NKVD orders. The victims were 3%–5% of the total population, and included monks, nationalists, patriots, military officers, nobles, intellectuals, and common citizens. Some authors also offer much higher estimates, up to 100,000 victims. At this time, Mongolia had an overall population of about 700,000 to 900,000 people. The proportion of victims to the total population was much higher than during the Great Purge in the Soviet Union. With the end of the purge in 1939, Marshal Choibalsan emerged as the premier and undisputed leader of the MPR.

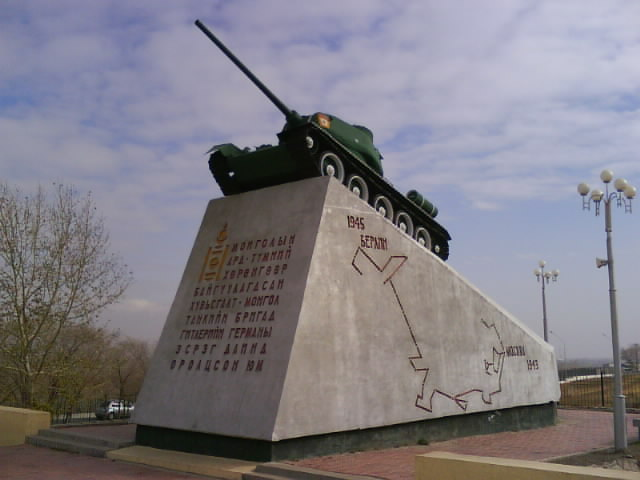
During the Great Patriotic War, the Mongolian people paid for a Soviet tank brigade and an air squadron.

In 1939, Soviet and Mongolian troops fought against Japan in the Battle of Khalkhyn Gol, the largest ever border conflict with Japan, in Eastern Mongolia. In August 1945, at the end of World War II, Mongolian troops took part in the Soviet operations against Japan in Inner Mongolia. Russian historian Viktor Suvorov wrote that in the Soviet war with Germany, Mongolian aid was as important as American aid, because warm clothes decided victory or defeat in the battles.

Also in August 1945, the Republic of China had finally agreed to recognize Mongolia's independence if a vote was held. The vote took place in the presence of Chinese observers on 20 October. The official result was 100% for independence.

After the 1949 Communist victory in China, Mongolia had good relations with both of its neighbors. The Cultural Revolution wreaked much havoc on minority cultures and ethnicities in China. In Inner Mongolia, some 790,000 people were persecuted. Of these, 22,900 were beaten to death and 120,000 were maimed, When the Sino-Soviet split developed in the late 1960s, the MPR, led by Yumjaagiin Tsedenbal, aligned itself firmly with the Soviet Union. Soviet troops were brought in 1967 to repel a possible military aggression from China. In 1961, Mongolia gained a seat in the UN, after earlier attempts had failed due to U.S. and Republic of China vetoes.

The post-war years also saw the acceleration of the drive towards creating a socialist society. In the 1950s, livestock was collectivized again. At the same time, state farms were established, and, with extensive aid from the USSR and China, infrastructure projects like the Trans-Mongolian Railway were completed. In the 1960s, Darkhan was built with aid from Soviet Union and other COMECON countries, and in the 1970s the Erdenet kombinat was created.

Despite denouncing Choibalsan's cult of personality, Tsedenbal opposed rehabilitation and orchestrated removals of political opponents and intelligentsia via internal exile. On 23 August 1984, Yumjaagiin Tsedenbal, at the age of 67, was ousted from party and government roles by party cadres with support from the USSR. Premier Jambyn Batmönkh succeeded Tsedenbal as party leader. Following the reforms of Mikhail Gorbachev, similar efforts for political and economic restructuring were implemented in the 1980s to combat economic stagnation.

==== Democracy ====
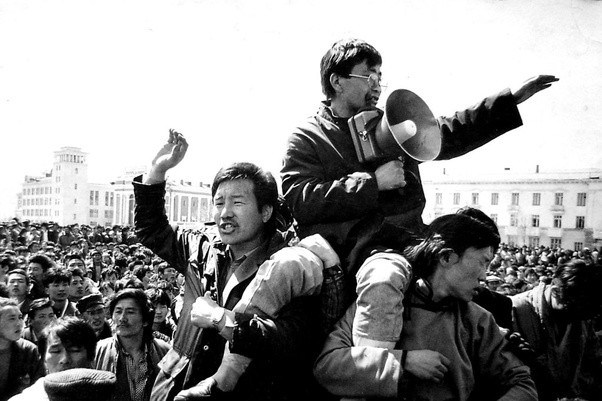
Sanjaasürengiin Zorig calming down the crowd in Sükhbaatar Square, March 1990

A modest meeting organized by the Mongolian Democratic Union (MDU) on 10 December 1989 landmarks the commencement of the Democratic Revolution of 1990 in Mongolia. The subsequent meetings involved ever-increasing numbers of supporters. A meeting with participation of 100,000 people took place on 4 March 1990 on the square at cinema Yalalt, now known as the Square of Liberty. The meeting turned into a demonstration at the Government Palace, which hosted the main state organs. The demonstrators demanded the resignations of the Political Bureau of the MPRP, a formation of a Provisional People's Khural during the month of March, and the separation of MPRP from the government; they handed their petition to a representative of the government.

Denial of these demands led to a hunger strike on 7 March 1990. Round table talks were subsequently held between 8-9 March 1990 by MDU leader Sanjaasürengiin Zorig and head of government Dumaagiin Sodnom. Following the agreement between the government and opposition, then leader of the MPRP, Jambyn Batmönkh, announced the resignation of the entire politburo via radio broadcast. He was relieved from his party duties and the politburo was reshuffled on 12 March 1990 during the party's emergency plenum. Constitutional amendments to the 1960 Constitution were introduced by the People's Great Khural in March and May 1990. The constitutional leading role of the MPRP was removed on 23 March 1990, officially ending the almost 70-year-long one party rule. The organization of the country's first free and fair elections were agreed upon in May 1990.

The first democratic elections were held in July 1990. The MPRP retained a majority in the Great Khural and also in the newly formed standing legislature, the State Little Khural. During the plenary session, Punsalmaagiin Ochirbat was elected the inaugural president of the MPR and Dashiin Byambasüren was appointed the prime minister in September 1990. Despite parliamentary majority, Byambasüren formed a unity government with the opposition. Talks for a new constitution began in 1991. The Constitution of Mongolia was ratified by president Ochirbat in January 1992.

=== Mongolia (1992–present) ===
Consequently, the Mongolian People's Republic officially ceased to exist on 12 February 1992, the day the constitution took effect. The new constitution renamed the country to Mongolia and established the country as a unitary, sovereign, and parliamentary republic with a president. The new unicameral legislature, the State Great Khural, was first elected with a MPRP majority in July 1992.

Incumbent president Punsalmaagiin Ochirbat was elected as the first president of Mongolia in the 1993 election. The Mongolian opposition formed the first non-MPRP government in 1996, when they achieved parliamentary majority.

On 3 October 2002, the Ministry of Foreign Affairs announced that Taiwan recognizes Mongolia as an independent country, although no legislative actions were taken to address concerns over its constitutional claims to Mongolia. Offices established to support Taipei's claims over Outer Mongolia, such as the Mongolian and Tibetan Affairs Commission, lie dormant and was eventually disbanded in September 2017.

In June 2021, former Prime Minister Ukhnaagiin Khurelsukh, the candidate of the ruling Mongolian People's Party (MPP), became the country's sixth democratically elected president after winning the presidential election.

== See also ==
- Architecture of Mongolia
- Central Asian studies
- Culture of Mongolia
- Geography of Mongolia
- History of Central Asia
- History of East Asia
- List of sovereign states by date of formation
- List of country-name etymologies § M
- Mongolian nobility
- Mongolian plateau
- Outline of Mongolia
- Politics of Mongolia
- Timeline of Mongolian history
