= 2021 Mongolian presidential election =

- 9 June 2021

Majority of the popular vote needed to prevent a run-off
- Turnout: 59.29% (▼1.38pp)
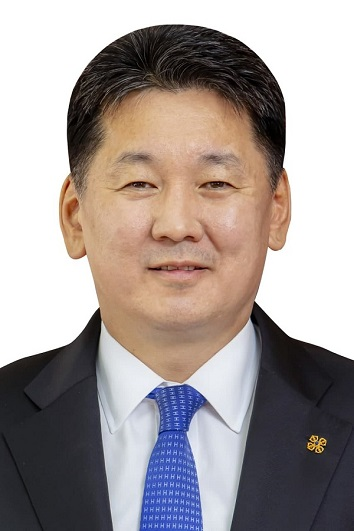

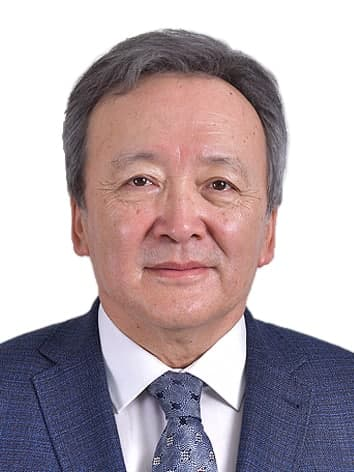

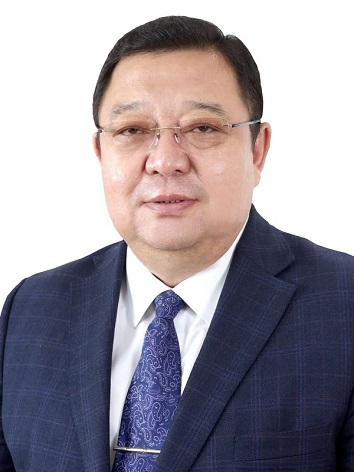
Nominee	Ukhnaagiin Khürelsükh	Dangaasürengiin Enkhbat	Sodnomzunduin Erdene
Party	MPP	RPEC	Democratic
Popular vote	823,326	246,968	72,832
Percentage	67.76%	20.33%	5.99%
President before election
Khaltmaagiin Battulga
Democratic
Elected President
Ukhnaagiin Khürelsükh
MPP

Presidential elections were held in Mongolia on 9 June 2021. The result was a victory for former prime minister Ukhnaagiin Khürelsükh of the Mongolian People's Party (MPP), who received 67.7% of the valid vote. Khürelsükh defeated Dangaasürengiin Enkhbat, who received a vote share of 20.33% for a third-party candidate, nominated from the Right Person Electorate Coalition; and Sodnomzunduin Erdene, who came in last with 5.99% of the popular vote, nominated from a fractured Democratic Party (DP). The victory by the governing MPP concluded the three-time consecutive presidential victory of the DP, which underperformed with only a thousand vote higher than the protest vote (5.92%).

Turnout was at 59.29%, lower by 1.38 percentage points than the previous election, its historic lowest in Mongolia. The elections were considered free and fair by OSCE. However, there was controversy as several opposition candidates were disqualified and former president Khaltmaagiin Battulga was barred from running for a second term.

The election commission registered three candidates—Khürelsükh (MPP), Enkhbat (RPEC), and Erdene (DP). Due to party disunity, the main opposition DP couldn't agree upon a single candidate, forcing the commission to controversially register the party's former chair Sodnomzunduin Erdene. Elections were held during a resurgence of COVID-19 cases in Mongolia, becoming the second election to be held during the pandemic. Prior to the last day of campaign, candidate Enkhbat tested positive for COVID-19 which led to the cancellation of a planned presidential debate.

== Background ==
=== 2017 presidential election ===
In the 2017 presidential election, Mongolia's first presidential run-off was held after no candidates received the majority vote. The nominee of the Mongolian People's Revolutionary Party, Sainkhüügiin Ganbaatar came in third with only a thousand-vote difference. Despite record high protest votes, the opposition DP presidential candidate, Khaltmaagiin Battulga, defeated the Mongolian People's Party (MPP) candidate and speaker, Miyeegombyn Enkhbold, with a close 9.4% margin.

Following the MPP's defeat, infighting between the factions led by chairman Enkhbold and rising figure Ukhnaagiin Khürelsükh occurred in the subsequent months. In late 2017, prime minister Jargaltulgyn Erdenebat was succeeded by Khürelsükh, who later became party chair. A series of mass demonstrations happened in December 2018, after the unravelling of a major corruption scandal. The protests coincited with the MPP's party politics and subsequent political gridlock since November 2018. Ultimately, a generational turnover in the MPP led to the dismissal of several MPP officials in December 2018 and ousting of speaker Enkhbold in January 2019. He was succeeded by Gombojavyn Zandanshatar on 1 February 2019.

A legislation allowing president Battulga to dismiss corrupt judges based on the suggestions of the National Security Council, a body chaired by the president, was passed in March 2019. The dismissal of justices, prosecutors and anti-corruption chiefs by the president in March and June caused a constitutional crisis in 2019. The crisis was followed by major constitutional amendments, which were in discussion since 2015. The amendments, empowering the parliamentary framework, were passed by two-thirds of parliament in November 2019.

=== 2020 parliamentary election ===
In the 2020 parliamentary election, the MPP won another landslide victory, this time winning a supermajority of 62 seats in the State Great Khural. The main opposition party, the Democratic Party (DP), won 11 seats, while the Mongolian People's Revolutionary Party (MPRP) and the newcomer National Labour Party each won a single seat. As a result, four political parties with parliamentary seats were eligible to compete in the upcoming 2021 presidential elections.

Despite gaining additional 2 seats, the DP faced a heavy defeat, as all of its incumbent lawmakers except Bökhchuluuny Pürevdorj lost re-election. Party chairman Sodnomzunduin Erdene also lost his seat in the 4th Bayangol district to the MPP. Following the wipeout, Erdene resigned as party chairman and transferred interim roles to MP-elect Tsevegdorjyn Tuvaan. The party was left weakened by the electoral defeat and internally fractured between various factions against and in support of then sitting DP president Khaltmaagiin Battulga.

=== Resignation of Khürelsükh ===
In late January 2021, MPP leader and premier Ukhnaagiin Khürelsükh resigned during his second term after two days of protest against government handling of the COVID-19 pandemic. Khürelsükh blamed incumbent president Battulga for inciting protests. This ultimately ended the close relationship between Khürelsükh and Battulga, and kicked off a showdown between Mongolia's two most powerful figures.

Khürelsükh's shock resignation led to the collapse of his second cabinet and the appointment of MPP lawmaker Luvsannamsrain Oyun-Erdene as the next prime minister. Khürelsükh remained as chairman of the MPP, leaving many political analysts to speculate that his resignation was an excuse for him to leave the office of prime minister and bid for the presidency.

On 16 April 2021, the Constitutional Court officially countered president Battulga's claims that he should be able to run for a second term. Two days later, Battulga issued an emergency decree to disband the MPP "in order to safeguard the sovereignty and democracy of the country" after the MPP passed amendments to the constitution. The constitutional amendments, which took effect in May 2020, stipulated that the Mongolian president could hold office only for a single term of six years, making Battulga ineligible to re-run in the 2021 presidential election. The State Great Khural did not accept his decree.

== Electoral system ==
Following the 2019 constitutional amendments, the president is elected using the two-round system for a six-year term and may only serve one term. Previously, the term was four years, renewable once. Political parties with representation in the State Great Khural are allowed to nominate candidates. The elected president must resign from any political party before their inauguration. Presidents can be removed through a two-thirds majority vote by the State Great Khural if found guilty of abusing their powers or violating the presidential oath.

Articles 97.9 and 99.2 of the electoral law determine how votes are counted, with blank ballots taken into account when determining whether a candidate has crossed the 50% threshold. If no candidate receives a majority of all votes cast in the second round (including blank votes), article 8.6.2 of the electoral law requires fresh elections to be held.

== Nominations ==
Political parties with representation in the State Great Khural were to nominate their candidates for the election on 2 May 2021. Consequently, four political parties and coalition with parliamentary seats were eligible to nominate presidential candidates.

=== Mongolian People's Party ===
According to a December 2020 survey conducted by MEC barometer, Ukhnaagiin Khürelsükh was the only MPP politician who was more popular than sitting president Battulga. Since his resignation as prime minister, it was widely believed by the public that he intended to run for the presidency.

The year 2021 marked the 100th anniversary of the MPP and the 1921 People's Revolution. In 29 April 2021, just six days before the nomination deadline, the MPRP agreed to merge back into the MPP after nearly a decade of separation. Following the merger of the MPRP and MPP in April 2021, Sainkhüügiin Ganbaatar, the only legislator of the Our Coalition, opposed the merger and defected to the opposition Democratic Party. The merger narrowed the maximum amount of presidential candidates from four to three following the dissolution of the Our Coalition in parliament. Former president and MPRP chairman Nambaryn Enkhbayar backed Khürelsükh for the presidency.

On 2 May 2021, former prime minister and MPP leader Ukhnaagiin Khürelsükh was nominated with 100% approval by the Executive Council of the MPP. The decision was further re-affirmed with 100% support by the General Assembly later that day.

_{1}

Mongolian People's Party Nominee
Ukhnaagiin Khürelsükh
for President
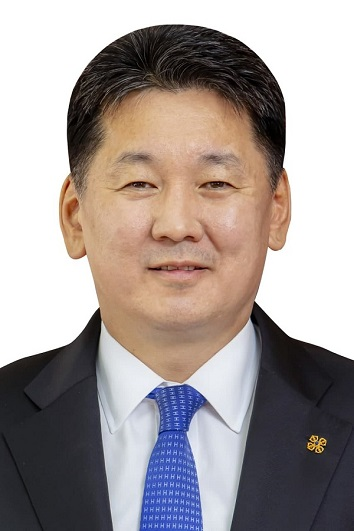
Chairman of the Mongolian People's Party
(2017–2021)

The X Mongolian People's Party General Assembly Vote on 2 May 2021
Candidate	Results	Votes	%
Ukhnaagiin Khürelsükh	Nominated	261	100

=== Democratic Party ===
Despite giving up his post to interim leader Tuvaan, Erdene re-entered the political scene in December 2020 and caused a leadership dispute in a "move against Battulga's presidential nomination." He appealled the registration authority to nullify Tuvaan's stamp and create a new party stamp for himself, "the legally registered party chair." In January 2021, a complex legal dispute arose when the Supreme Court refused to register Erdene as party chair, while also declining to approve DP charter changes necessary for choosing the next leader, citing conflicts with the party's existing charter. Both stamps weren't recognized by the courts. In the coming months, the factionalized party divided on the matter of re-nominating incumbent president Battulga for the upcoming presidential election in 2021. On 1 February 2021, political infightings within the DP reached a new point when both Erdene and Tuvaan discharged each other from their respective posts. Few prominent figures including Tsedevdambyn Oyungerel, Erdeniin Bat-Üül, and Rinchinnyamyn Amarjargal backed Erdene.

In mid March 2021, campaign for the next party chair began between four candidates from Tuvaan-led DP. However, due to public demand for a united primary, the total candidates for the primary was expanded to nine, including DP members allied to Erdene. Approximately 200,000 DP members and supporters were eligible to vote. On 27 March 2021, Odongiin Tsogtgerel was voted with 21% support while no other candidates tested above 20%. He was further confirmed as party chair at an extraordinary Party Congress on 3 April 2021. Meanwhile, on 7 April 2021, Erdene's camp held an online Party Congress, electing not-well known Mainbayaryn Tulgat as their chairman. Neither of the two leaders was officially recognized by the Supreme Court, which stated that its an "internal party matter that the Supreme Court should not be involved with".

Without party unity and consensus, two separate presidential primaries were held by both factions on 1 May 2021. Former prime minister Norovyn Altankhuyag was nominated by the Tsogtgerel-led faction, whilst Erdene was nominated by the Tulgat-led faction. Tsedevdambyn Oyungerel had been considered a potential candidate, but she lost her bid to Erdene. Erdene's self-nomination caused nearly all other candidates, the entire DP parliamentary caucus, and local chapters to distance themselves from him. Altankhuyag's nomination was further backed with 97.6% approval from the party's governing body, the National Policy Committee, on 2 May 2021.

_{2}
Democratic Party Nominees
Sodnomzunduin Erdene	Norovyn Altangerel
for President	for President
Chairman of the Democratic Party (2017–2020)	Member of the State Great Khural (2020–present)

==== Nominations from Tulgat-led DP ====
Potential candidates from Tulgat-led DP
Sodnomzunduin Erdene	Rinchinnyamyn Amarjargal	Tsedevdambyn Oyungerel	Lamjavyn Gündalai	Dashdondogiin Ganbat
Chairman of the Democratic Party (2017–2020)	Prime Minister of Mongolia (1999–2000)	Member of the State Great Khural (2012–2016)	Member of the State Great Khural (2000–2012)	Member of the State Great Khural (2012–2016, 2020–present)
Nominated: May 1; 1,953.05 score	Eliminated: May 1; 1,826.03 score	Eliminated: May 1; 1,719.03 score	Eliminated: May 1; 1,463.92 score	Eliminated: May 1; 637.28 score

The Democratic Party Primary on 1 May 2021
Candidate	Results	Points
Sodnomzunduin Erdene	Nominated	1,953.05
Rinchinnyamyn Amarjargal	Eliminated	1,826.03
Tsedevdambyn Oyungerel	Eliminated	1,719.03
Lamjavyn Gündalai	Eliminated	1,463.92
Dashdondogiin Ganbat	Eliminated	637.28

==== Nominations from Tsogtgerel-led DP ====
Potential candidates from Tsogtgerel-led DP
Norovyn Altankhuyag	Sainkhuugiin Ganbaatar	Dashdondogiin Ganbat	Khishigdembereliin Temuujin
Member of the State Great Khural (1996–2000, 2008–2016, 2020–present); Prime Minister of Mongolia (2012–2014); Chairman of the Democratic Party (2008–2014)	Member of the State Great Khural (2012–2016, 2020–present) (Note: Joined the DP after leaving the MPRP in April 2021)	Member of the State Great Khural (2012–2016, 2020–present)	Minister of Justice and Home Affairs (2012–2014)
Nominated: May 1-2; 43,994 votes (81.06%)	Eliminated: May 1 Unknown votes (%)	Eliminated: May 1 Unknown votes (%)	Withdrew: May 1 Did not participate in primary

On 2 May 2021, Altankhuyag's nomination was confirmed with 97.6% support from the 286-member party's governing body, the National Policy Committee. The vote was conducted in a secret ballot.

The Democratic Party Primary on 1 May 2021
Candidate	Results	Votes	%
Norovyn Altankhuyag	Nominated	43,994	81.06
Sainkhüügiin Ganbaatar	Eliminated	–	18.94
Dashdondogiin Ganbat	Eliminated	–	18.94

=== Right Person Electorate Coalition ===
The Right Person Electorate Coalition (RPEC), with a single parliamentary seat, announced on 5 February 2021 that the coalition would organize a 45-day online public vote campaign to select its candidate. Chairman of the National Labour Party, Togmidyn Dorjkhand, stated that Mongolian citizens could vote anyone they like for presidential nomination. By May 2021, 141 people from all sectors were nominated by 17,861 Mongolians. The RPEC officially asked for the approval of nomination from five individuals, with political commentator Jargalsaikhan Dambadarjaa rejecting his candidacy. On 2 May 2021, the highest decision-making body of the coalition chose internet entrepenuer and former member of parliament Dangaasürengiin Enkhbat as its nomination with 66.7% in favour. Enkhbat accepted the nomination as an independent.

_{3}
Right Person Electorate Coalition Nominee
Dangaasürengiin Enkhbat
for President
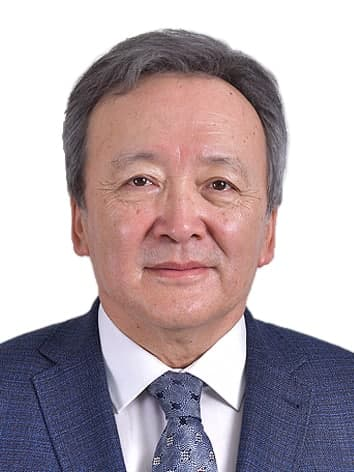
Member of the State Great Khural
(2008–2012)

The Right Person Electorate Coalition Primary on 2 May 2021
Candidate	Results	Votes	%
Dangaasürengiin Enkhbat	Nominated	–	66.7
Tsedevdambyn Oyungerel	Eliminated	–	33.3
Bat-Erdeniin Batbayar	Eliminated	–	33.3
Bundangiin Boldsaikhan	Eliminated	–	33.3

== Registered candidates ==
The General Election Commission (GEC) registered two candidates on 5 May 2021. Four registration materials (two from the DP) were received by the GEC. According to the electoral law, the commission required the DP to submit only one candidate until 6 pm on 5 May 2021. Although the deadline was extended until midnight, neither Altankhuyag (supported by all DP lawmakers) nor Erdene withdrew their documents. Ultimately, the GEC controversially accepted the registration materials of Erdene on 6 May 2021, formally confirming him as the DP's candidate. The decision was made on the basis of his legal status as party leader in 2017. The refusal of Altankhuyag's candidacy immediately caused five DP lawmakers and supporters to protest and launch a hunger strike at Sükhbaatar Square.

Names	Born	Last position	Party
Ukhnaagiin Khürelsükh	14 June 1968 (52); Ulaanbaatar, Mongolia	Prime Minister of Mongolia (2017–2021); Chairman of the MPP (2017–2021); Member of the State Great Khural (2020–2021)	Mongolian People's Party
Sodnomzunduin Erdene	28 July 1963 (57); Ulaanbaatar, Mongolia	Chairman of the Democratic Party (2017–2020); Member of the State Great Khural (2016–2020)	Democratic Party of Mongolia
Dangaasürengiin Enkhbat	19 January 1959 (62); Ulaanbaatar, Mongolia	Member of the State Great Khural (2008–2012)	Right Person Electorate Coalition

== Opinion polls ==
Former Prime Minister Ukhnaagiin Khürelsükh led the opinion polls according to an MEC survey in April 2021.

Polling firm	Fieldwork date	Sample size	Khürelsükh MPP	Erdene DP	Enkhbat RPEC	PS	Blank ballot	NV	Und./NA/ DK
Strategy Academy	12 May 2021	4,000	33.8	6.7	14.8	6.2	–	–	38.6
MEC	17–20 May 2021	2,000	44.0	3.0	10.0	–	8.0	–	35.0
Strategy Academy	18 May 2021	4,000	38.4	5.6	12.8	4.3	–	–	38.8
Strategy Academy	30 May 2021	4,000	40.6	4.1	10.3	5.9	–	7.1	32.0
Pro Capital	2 Jun 2021	5,000	47.4	31.1	21.5	–	–	–	–
Strategy Academy	5 Jun 2021	4,000	34.8	2.6	10.3	8.8	3.3	7.0	33.3

== Results ==
Second place by administrative divisions: Khürelsükh Enkhbat Erdene Blank

Polls opened at 07:00 in 2,087 polling stations across the country for the 2 million registered voters, with special measures in place due to the COVID-19 pandemic in Mongolia. Voting ended at 22:00. Khürelsükh and Erdene voted in Ulaanbaatar, while Enkhbat tested positive for COVID-19 and voted in the hospital.

Candidate	Party	Votes	%
Ukhnaagiin Khürelsükh	Mongolian People's Party	823,326	67.76
Dangaasürengiin Enkhbat	Right Person Electorate Coalition	246,968	20.33
Sodnomzunduin Erdene	Democratic Party	72,832	5.99
Blank votes		71,937	5.92
Total		1,215,063	100.00
Total votes		1,215,063	–
Registered voters/turnout		2,049,379	59.29
Source: General Election Commission

Vote share
Khürelsükh	67.76%
Enkhbat	20.33%
Erdene	5.99%
Blank votes	5.92%

Results of Khürelsükh by administrative divisions

Results of Enkhbat by administrative divisions

Results of Erdene by administrative divisions

=== By area ===
Subdivision	Ukhnaagiin Khürelsükh MPP		Dangaasürengiin Enkhbat RPEC		Sodnomzunduin Erdene DP	
Subdivision	Votes	%	Votes	%	Votes	%
Aimags of Mongolia
Arkhangai	23,870	69.85%	3,046	8.91%	6,186	18.10%
Bayan-Ölgii	29,474	81.53%	1,616	4.47%	2,636	7.29%
Bayankhongor	23,522	74.60%	2,507	7.95%	1,898	6.02%
Bulgan	17,825	78.34%	2,290	10.06%	1,401	6.16%
Govi-Altai	18,336	84.60%	1,640	7.57%	1,099	5.07%
Govisümber	5,032	76.87%	846	12.92%	414	6.32%
Dornogovi	20,434	74.62%	4,336	15.83%	1,476	5.39%
Dornod	21,291	73.98%	4,292	14.91%	1,433	4.98%
Dundgovi	12,786	79.06%	1,726	10.67%	856	5.29%
Zavkhan	22,058	76.21%	3,220	11.12%	1,915	6.62%
Övörkhangai	32,879	79.32%	4,284	10.33%	1,915	4.62%
Ömnögovi	17,870	74.16%	3,170	13.16	1,625	6.74%
Sükhbaatar	23,215	87.28%	1,356	5.10%	880	3.31%
Selenge	25,149	69.93%	5,901	16.41%	2,401	6.68%
Töv	26,481	78.38%	4,073	12.05%	1,560	4.62%
Uvs	23,642	77.49%	2,689	8.81%	1,063	3.48%
Khovd	24,366	73.96%	4,176	12.68%	3,349	10.17%
Khövsgöl	32,931	68.11%	7,937	16.42%	4,901	10.14%
Khentii	26,356	82.52%	2,393	7.49%	2,361	7.39%
Darkhan-Uul	24,714	67.46%	7,764	21.19%	1,628	4.44%
Orkhon	27,408	68.94%	7,962	20.03%	1,530	3.85%
Düüregs of Ulaanbaatar
Khan-Uul	43,237	53.80%	27,890	34.70%	4,063	5.06%
Baganuur	7,940	72.43%	1,920	17.52%	670	6.11%
Bagakhangai	1,492	84.53%	155	8.78%	65	3.68%
Bayanzürkh	82,796	59.32%	42,414	30.39%	5,627	4.03%
Nalaikh	10,309	72.51%	2,570	18.08%	667	4.69%
Sükhbaatar	32,710	56.74%	18,090	31.38%	3,193	5.54%
Chingeltei	35,830	61.69%	15,680	27.00%	2,757	4.75%
Bayangol	48,954	52.61%	30,249	32.51%	8,361	8.99%
Songino Khairkhan	79,244	67.34%	26,692	22.68%	4,742	4.03%
Overseas	1,175	21.10%	4,084	73.35%	160	2.87%
Total	823,326	67.76%	246,968	20.33%	72,832	5.99%

== Voter turnout ==
Region	Time							
Region	9:00	10:00	11:00	12:00	13:00	14:00	17:00	22:00
Arkhangai	0.93%	1.60%	8.98%	11.35%	12.28%	13.24%	31.03%	55.80%
Bayan-Ölgii	1.30%	2.21%	5.66%	8.86%	10.32%	11.53%	30.75%	58.70%
Bayankhongor	2.10%	2.85%	13.00%	15.45%	16.78%	18.04%	34.51%	55.90%
Bulgan	1.29%	1.83%	9.43%	12.45%	13.45%	14.27%	32.33%	56.10%
Govi-Altai	2.57%	3.35%	15.84%	19.54%	20.98%	22.18%	41.22%	57.80%
Govisümber	0.00%	0.00%	16.30%	16.30%	16.30%	16.30%	35.86%	61.10%
Dornogovi	3.35%	4.38%	14.63%	18.73%	20.47%	22.15%	39.13%	61.00%
Dornod	2.31%	2.49%	10.48%	14.38%	16.42%	18.41%	32.48%	55.70%
Dundgovi	2.51%	3.34%	15.32%	17.64%	18.81%	20.02%	34.63%	53.30%
Zavkhan	1.43%	1.73%	14.20%	15.24%	16.23%	17.17%	37.87%	61.10%
Övörkhangai	2.12%	2.74%	12.60%	16.60%	17.95%	19.15%	35.63%	55.80%
Ömnögovi	2.62%	3.58%	14.30%	18.24%	19.58%	20.72%	33.75%	52.70%
Sükhbaatar	2.74%	3.70%	15.30%	17.77%	19.28%	20.98%	41.76%	64.80%
Selenge	1.05%	1.42%	9.03%	12.12%	12.80%	13.79%	27.26%	51.20%
Töv	1.25%	1.76%	12.75%	15.21%	15.99%	16.72%	33.39%	54.50%
Uvs	1.58%	2.75%	9.72%	13.31%	15.17%	16.97%	35.43%	58.80%
Khovd	1.33%	1.86%	11.32%	12.90%	14.72%	16.32%	37.41%	60.70%
Khövsgöl	1.98%	2.50%	12.49%	14.48%	15.57%	16.73%	33.66%	55.90%
Khentii	2.03%	3.06%	14.64%	18.74%	20.19%	21.43%	41.48%	63.70%
Darkhan-Uul	6.28%	8.36%	14.28%	18.25%	22.02%	25.72%	36.26%	56.00%
Orkhon	7.20%	10.22%	15.57%	20.08%	24.46%	28.46%	38.44%	58.90%
Ulaanbaatar	6.25%	10.07%	18.82%	19.63%	24.09%	28.90%	40.60%	61.69%
Mongolia	–	–	13.45%	–	–	23.46%	37.73%	59.29%
