= 2021 Mongolian protests =

2021 COVID-19 protests in Mongolia

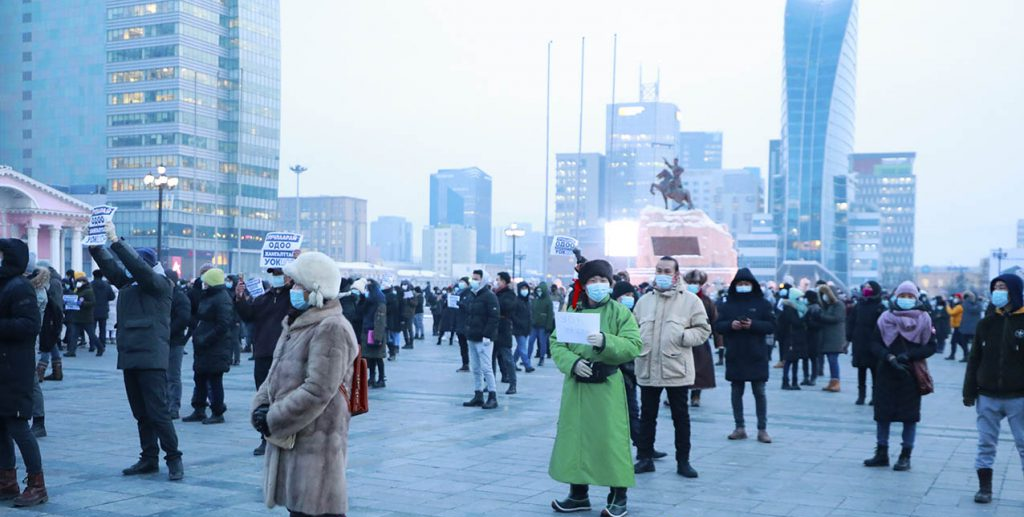
- Protestors gathering at Sukhbaatar Square in Ulaanbaatar on 20 January 2021
- Date: 20 January 2021 – 22 January 2021 (2 days)
- Location: Ulaanbaatar, Mongolia
- Caused by: Mistreatment of Covid-19 patients; Poor government handling of the pandemic; Economic hardship; Dissatisfaction with the MPP
- Goals: Accountability for hospital workers; Resignation of the Khurelsukh cabinet, the NEC and the NCCD; Demands for press freedom and freedom of speech; Relaxation of Covid-19 lockdown measurements
- Methods: Peaceful demonstrations; Online activism
- Result: Protests successful: Resignation of Khurelsukh and his cabinet; Appointment of Oyun-Erdene as the country's next prime minister

Parties
(Mongolia) Protestors (no central leadership) Supported by: Democratic Party	Government of Mongolia: Mongolian People's Party; National Emergency Commission; National Center for Communicable Diseases

The 2021 Mongolian protests were mass demonstrations in the Mongolian capital of Ulaanbaatar that led to the resignation of Prime Minister Ukhnaagiin Khürelsükh.

Thousands protested on the streets between 20 and 22 January 2021 against the government's response to the COVID-19 pandemic in Mongolia. The protests were sparked by public outrage over widely circulated footage showing a new mother and her newborn being transferred to a quarantine facility in freezing conditions.

Protesters demanded the removal of various government officials, eventually leading to the resignation of the Prime Minister and his cabinet on 21 January. The protests took place against a backdrop of wider frustration over economic hardship and rising unemployment, despite earlier praise from the World Health Organization for Mongolia’s initial handling of the pandemic.

== Background ==
During the COVID-19 pandemic in Mongolia, restrictions on movement between provinces had been imposed since November 2020, leaving about 80,000 people stranded in the capital as of January 2021. Many complained of waiting weeks for virus tests to allow them to return to their homes or of having to sleep in their cars with hotels closed due to lockdowns. From March 2020, Mongolia only allowed citizens to enter the country on chartered flights and required 21 days of quarantine in centralised facilities, followed by two weeks of further isolation at home. As of the time of the protests, there were 1,584 coronavirus cases in the country and three deaths.

To prevent the steady rise in coronavirus cases across the country, a 14-day long strict lockdowns were put in place in Ulaanbaatar on 23 December 2020. The lockdowns were further extended on January 4th by the government for 4 more days. Residents of Ulaanbaatar were ultimately met with a 50 day strict lockdown in the first half of 2021. On 20 January 2021, footage circulated on television and social media showing a woman and her newborn being transferred to a COVID-19 quarantine facility in freezing weather, with the mother dressed only in a hospital gown. The footage sparked widespread outrage over the perceived mistreatment of the patient, especially given that Mongolian tradition holds new mothers should be protected from cold weather and avoid cold food during the first month after childbirth.

== Protests ==
Public outrage over the footage of a mother and her newborn sparked a peaceful protest at Sukhbaatar Square in Ulaanbaatar. Around 5,000 mostly young protesters gathered in front of government buildings, with some holding bundled cloths symbolizing infants. Initially focused on holding hospital staff accountable, the protests quickly expanded in scope. Public anger grew to include broader demands for press freedom, freedom of assembly, and criticism of the government’s overall handling of the pandemic, particularly its lockdown measures. The demonstrations soon reflected deeper frustrations with governance in Mongolia and led to calls for the removal of officials at the National Emergency Commission, the National Center for Communicable Diseases, the National First Responders, and ultimately, the cabinet and the prime minister.

On the first day of the protests, Deputy Prime Minister Yangugiin Sodbaatar and Health Minister Togtmol Munkhsaikhan submitted their resignations to the Prime Minister Ukhnaagiin Khürelsükh in response to the public outrage. The directors of both the hospital and the National Center for Communicable Diseases, at the center of the controversy, also stepped down. The following day, the Prime Minister announced his own resignation, stating "Two of my cabinet members have decided to resign from their positions. When I first formed this cabinet, I planned to work with the whole team of the cabinet together. Therefore, the Prime Minister should assume the responsibility upon himself and accept the demand from the public." He also emphasized that he would not be withdrawing from politics and that he would remain committed to upholding justice and strengthening Mongolian statehood.

Khurelsukh accused President Khaltmaagiin Battulga, a member of the opposition Democratic Party whose term was set to end later that year, of orchestrating the protests. Battulga responded with surprise, stating "I wonder and wonder why the prime minister of Mongolia did such an act that undermined the trust of the Mongolian people, undermined national unity and openly slandered the president of Mongolia."

On January 22, the parliament, which was controlled by Khurelsukh’s Mongolian People’s Party, voted overwhelmingly to accept his resignation. He was succeeded by Luvsannamsrain Oyun-Erdene, then chief cabinet secretary. At the time of his resignation, Mongolia had recorded 1,584 confirmed COVID-19 cases and three deaths, according to the health ministry, although Khurelsukh stated in his resignation speech that the country had not yet reported any fatalities from the virus.

== Aftermath ==
Khurelsukh's resignation was seen as a surprise both domestically and internationally and did little to quell public dissatisfaction. According to Turboldyn Bat-Orgil, an independent 2020 parliamentary candidate and government critic, many Mongolians remained skeptical of the prime minister’s motives, describing the resignation as abrupt and puzzling. Many saw the resignation as an excuse for Khurelsukh to leave the office of Prime Minister and run for the presidency in the upcoming presidential election.

After his resignation, Khurelsukh still remained as the chairman of the MPP until June 2021, when he became the MPP presidential candidate for the 2021 election and subsequently won by a landslide victory. He was elected the 6th President of Mongolia, succeeding Battulga. Oyun-Erdene was nominated as the MPP's next party chairman on June 25.

== See also ==
- 2008 riot in Mongolia
- 2018-2019 Mongolian protests
- 2022 Mongolian protests
- 2025 Mongolian protests
