= Ukhnaagiin Khürelsükh =

President of Mongolia from 2021 to 2026

His Excellency Ukhnaagiin Khürelsükh
- Ухнаагийн Хүрэлсүх
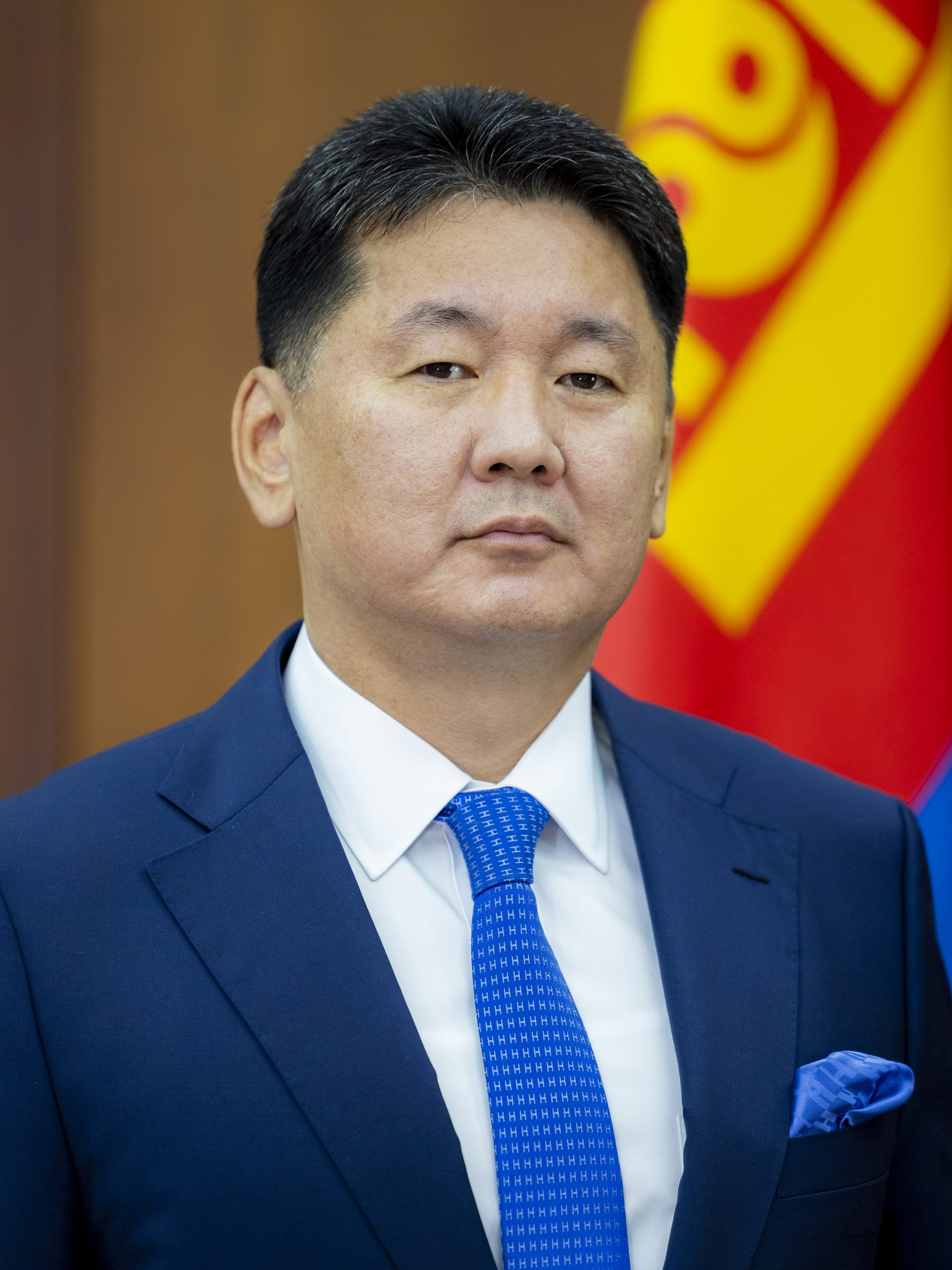
- Official portrait, 2022

President of Mongolia
- In office 25 June 2021 – 19 November 2026
- Prime Minister: Luvsannamsrain Oyun-Erdene; Gombojavyn Zandanshatar; Nyam-Osoryn Uchral
- Preceded by: Khaltmaagiin Battulga
- Succeeded by: Sandagiin Byambatsogt (acting)

Prime Minister of Mongolia
- In office 4 October 2017 – 27 January 2021
- President: Khaltmaagiin Battulga
- Deputy: Ölziisaikhany Enkhtüvshin; Yangugiin Sodbaatar
- Preceded by: Jargaltulgyn Erdenebat
- Succeeded by: Luvsannamsrain Oyun-Erdene

Deputy Prime Minister of Mongolia
- In office 23 July 2016 – 4 October 2017
- Prime Minister: Jargaltulgyn Erdenebat
- Preceded by: Tserendashiin Oyunbaatar
- Succeeded by: Ölziisaikhany Enkhtüvshin
- In office 10 December 2014 – 6 August 2015
- Prime Minister: Chimediin Saikhanbileg
- Preceded by: Dendeviin Terbishdagva
- Succeeded by: Tserendashiin Oyunbaatar

Chairman of the Mongolian People's Party
- In office 21 November 2017 – 25 June 2021
- Preceded by: Miyeegombyn Enkhbold
- Succeeded by: Luvsannamsrain Oyun-Erdene

Member of the State Great Khural
- In office 30 June 2020 – 25 June 2021
- Constituency: 18th, Khentii Province
- In office 6 July 2012 – November 2012
- Constituency: Closed list
- In office 2000–2008
- Constituency: 51st, Khentii Province (2000–2004; 2004–2008)
Ministerial offices
Minister for Professional Inspection
In office 28 January 2006 – 29 November 2007
Prime Minister	Miyeegombyn Enkhbold; Sanjiin Bayar
Preceded by	Dambiin Dorligjav
Succeeded by	Position abolished
Minister for Emergency Situations
In office 28 September 2004 – 28 January 2006
Prime Minister	Tsakhiagiin Elbegdorj
Preceded by	Position established
Succeeded by	Sainbuyangiin Otgonbayar

Personal details
- Born: 14 June 1968 (age 58) Ulaanbaatar, Mongolia
- Party: Mongolian People's Party
- Spouse: Luvsandorjiin Bolortsetseg
- Children: 2 daughters
- Education: Defense University of Mongolia; National University of Mongolia
- Website: Official website

Military service
- Allegiance: Mongolian People's Republic
- Branch/service: Mongolian People's Army
- Years of service: 1985–1990
- Rank: Colonel

Ukhnaagiin Khürelsükh (Note: Mongolian: Ухнаагийн Хүрэлсүх, pronounced [ʊχˈnaɣʲiɴ ˈxurĕɮsux]) (born 14 June 1968) is a Mongolian politician who served as the country's sixth president from 2021 to 2026. He previously served as the 30th and 31st prime minister from 2017 to 2021 and was elected to the Parliament of Mongolia four times – in 2000, 2004, 2012, and 2020.

Before his premiership, Khürelsükh served in the Mongolian government as Minister for Emergency Situations from 2004 to 2006, Minister for Professional Inspection from 2006 to 2008, and two stints as deputy prime minister between 2014 and 2017. He was the secretary-general of the Mongolian People's Party from 2008 to 2012 and its chairman from 2017 to 2021.

On 19 November 2026, President Khürelsükh was relieved of his duties, two days after he announced his resignation to refute corruption allegations and "defend his reputation" on 17 November 2026. He was succeeded by Sandagiin Byambatsogt, the Chairman of the State Great Khural, as acting officeholder until a new president is elected within four months.

== Background ==
Khürelsükh was born to a driver's family on 14 June 1968 in Ulaanbaatar, Mongolia. His father, Ukhnaa, was born in Khentii-Sükhbaatar Province, prompting Khürelsükh to take up his father's birthplace as his constituency. In an interview he gave for TV25, Khürelsükh stated that his father met his mother in Govi-Altai Province while he was making wells. The couple then moved to the capital, Ulaanbaatar, where Khürelsükh was born.

Prior to his birth, his father and older sister found a small bronze axe next to a hot spring well, thus prompting the family to name the newborn Khürelsükh, which literally means "bronze axe". Khürelsükh has one older brother, one older sister, and two younger brothers, most of whom are also drivers. According to an April 2024 article in JICA magazine, Khürelsükh stated on a 2022 visit to Japan that he "fondly remembers the warm hospitality of his host family when he came to Japan for a JICA training program as a young man."

=== Education ===
Khürelsükh graduated from the Secondary School No. 2 in 1985. He graduated from the University of Defense in 1989, with a major in political studies. He studied public administration at the Institute of State Administration and Management Development and Law at the National University of Mongolia, from which he graduated in 1994 and 2000, respectively.

=== Military career ===
From 1989 to 1990, Khürelsükh served as a political deputy in the 1152nd Unit of the Mongolian People's Army. He was the first Mongolian military officer to resign from duty to maintain his party membership in 1990 when the government sought to separate party membership from various (public) offices. Khürelsükh's highest rank was colonel.

== Political career ==
=== Beginnings (1989–2000) ===
Khürelsükh worked as a political officer at the Central Committee of the Mongolian People's Revolutionary Party (former communist party which ruled the country from 1921 to 1990) in the early 90s, making him one of the youngest officers in the Central Committee. Khürelsükh was appointed as adviser at the MPRP parliamentary group secretariat in 1994. Having worked there until 1996, he further rose through the ranks to become the general director of the Youth Development Center of the MPRP. This stint led him to found the Mongolian Democratic Socialist Youth Federation (MDSYF), the youth wing of the party, in 1997. He held the position until 2005, which led him to be called the leader of the party's so-called "youth faction". Khürelsükh caught the public's attention in the 1990s by organizing demonstrations and hunger strikes in opposition to the political situation at the time.

=== Political rise (2000–2016) ===
In 2000, Khürelsükh ran for a member of parliament, winning and serving two consecutive terms in the State Great Khural. While serving his second term as Member of Parliament, Khürelsükh was appointed Minister of Emergency Situations in 2004–2006 and Minister of Professional Inspection in 2006–2008. In 2007, he founded the Left-wing Association of Mongolia, an NGO that supports the Mongolian People's Party. The majority of the founding members were activists in the MDSYF, who had aged out of the party's youth wing.

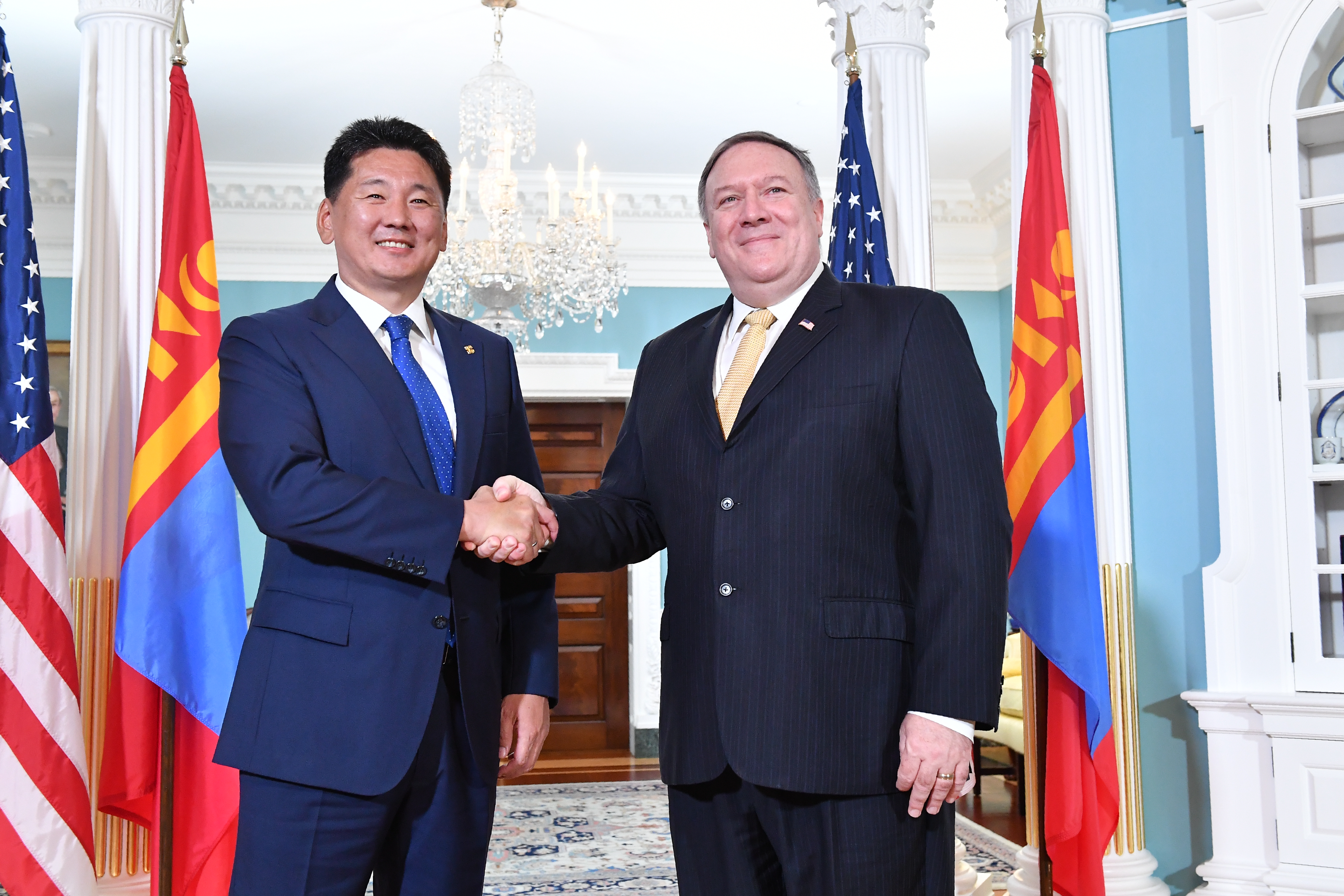
Khürelsükh with US Secretary of State Mike Pompeo in 2018

Khürelsükh was successful within his party, having been elected to the Governing Board of the Mongolian People's Revolutionary Party for eight years starting from 2000. In 2008, he was unanimously voted the Secretary-General of the Party. Khürelsükh served as the Secretary-General until 2012, when he resigned. In 2008, Khürelsükh was briefly interrogated after being accused of using funds from the bankrupt Savings Bank of Mongolia to purchase a car for personal use. In 2012, Khürelsükh was elected Member of Parliament for a third time. He was appointed the Deputy Prime Minister of Mongolia in 2013, serving in this role for four years until he was appointed Prime Minister of Mongolia in 2017. He was awarded the United Nations Champion for Disaster Risk Reduction in 2017.

=== Prime Minister of Mongolia (2017–2021) ===
Mongolia's parliament confirmed the nomination of Khürelsükh as the 30th Prime Minister of Mongolia in October 2017. Khürelsükh succeeded Jargaltulgyn Erdenebat, who was voted out of office in September 2017 amid allegations of corruption and incompetence. During his confirmation hearing, the new prime minister stated "My cabinet ... will declare justice again," and, added, "don't come to me with illegal acts as well as my cabinet members and don't pressure us to act illegally." One of Khürelsükh's largest projects was the oil refinery plant in Dornogovi Province. The oil refinery, established with support from India, will be capable of processing 1.5 million tonnes of crude oil per year, or 30,000 barrels per day, which will be enough to cover domestic needs.

==== Foreign policy ====
Khürelsükh has made significant contributions to Mongolia's foreign relations. In April 2018, during an official visit to China, Khürelsükh signed 11 bilateral agreements worth $450 million, including a pact for economic and technological cooperation worth 2 billion yuan ($315 million). The Prime Minister's visit to the United States of America in September 2018 elevated the cooperation levels between the two countries to an expanded comprehensive partnership. This paved the way for Mongolia and the US to become strategic partners a year later. During the historic visit, Khürelsükh met the Secretary of State Michael Pompeo to ink the $350 million Millennium Challenge Corporation Mongolia Water Compact.

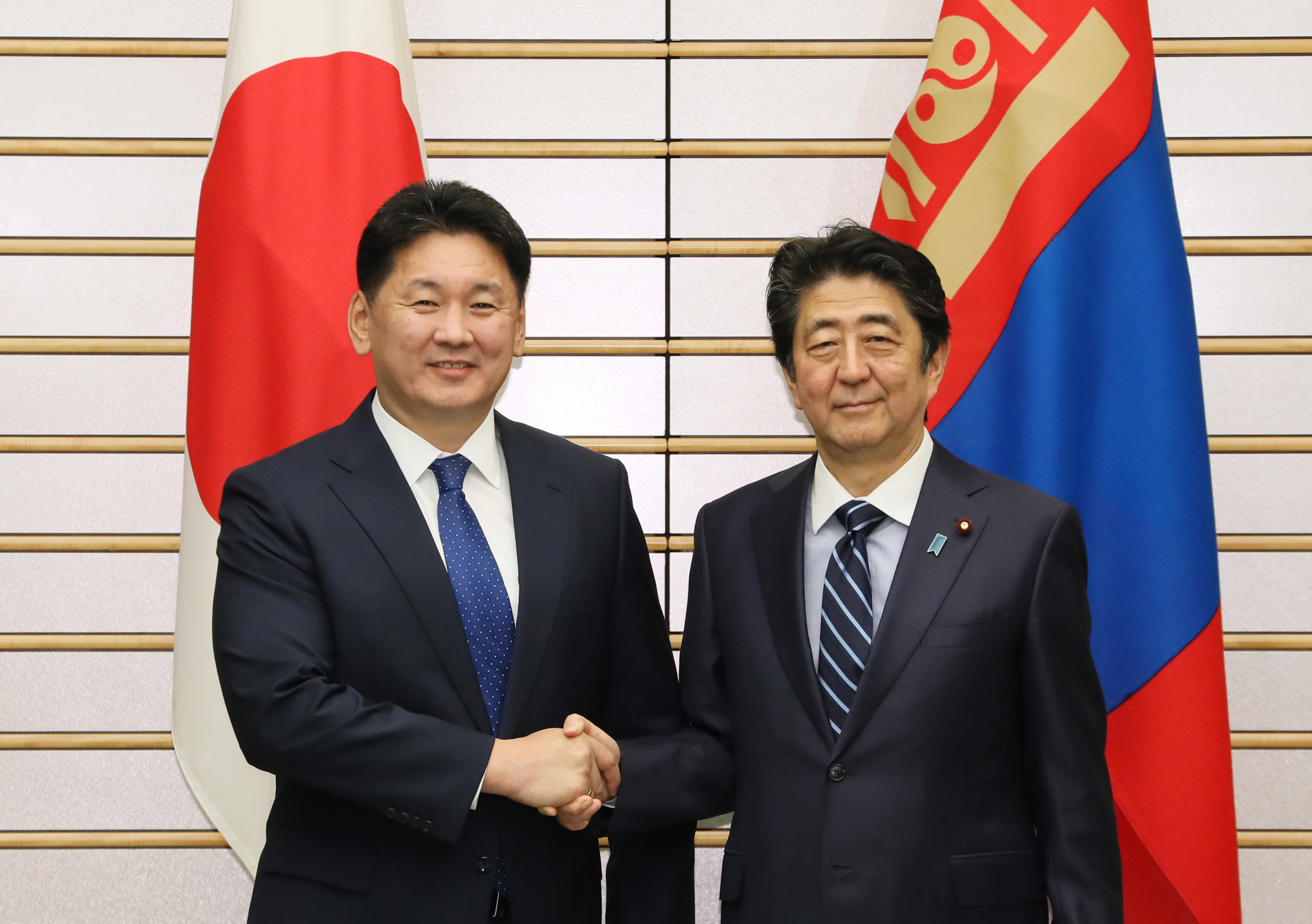
Khürelsükh and Japanese prime minister Shinzo Abe in Tokyo, Japan, 13 December 2018

Khürelsükh has served as a mediator between Japan and North Korea. Khürelsükh made an official visit to Japan in December 2018 and met Prime Minister Shinzo Abe to reiterate close bilateral cooperation as part of a Japan-Mongolia Summit Meeting. Following the summit meeting, the signing of the "Memorandum of Cooperation Between the Ministry of the Environment of Japan and the Ministry of Environment and Tourism of Mongolia on Environmental Cooperation" took place in the presence of the two leaders, and a Japan-Mongolia joint statement and fact sheet for the "Japan-Mongolia Mid-term Action Plan for a Strategic Partnership" were also issued. The two sides also discussed about the New Ulaanbaatar International Airport.

Khürelsükh has contributed to bilateral relations with South Korea, choosing South Korea as one of his first official trips abroad. In January 2018, Khürelsükh spent three days in South Korea, accompanied by 7 cabinet ministers, and met with the president of South Korea Moon Jae-in and the prime minister of South Korea Lee Nak-yon.

Khürelsükh represented the Mongolian Government at the 73rd session of the United Nations General Assembly, addressing the General debate to raise issues such as inequality, human rights, and climate change. A little over a year after he was appointed, Khürelsükh survived a no confidence vote amid a corruption scandal implicating high-level politicians. In a council meeting the previous month, Khürelsükh demanded that several high-ranking officials step down for various reasons, including incompetence, resulting in the vote to oust him from office.

Khürelsükh led his party to a landslide victory in the parliamentary election on 24 June 2020. In his election campaign, he noted that Mongolia would become an energy independent country from Russia. He and his party are credited for having successfully reduced air pollution in the country's capital, championing the Constitutional reform, and keeping the country relatively safe from the COVID-19 pandemic. However, he resigned from his post on 21 January 2021, citing street protests against public health service shortcomings. He was succeeded by MPP lawmaker Luvsannamsrain Oyun-Erdene on 27 January 2021. Khürelsükh continued to serve as a member of parliament, representing Khentii Province in the State Great Khural.

Khürelsükh with Narendra Modi in October 2025

== Party roles ==
Khürelsükh started his political career as a political officer at the Central Committee of the Mongolian People's Revolutionary Party (MPRP) in 1991. Between 1994 and 1996, he worked as an adviser to the secretariat of the MPRP's faction in parliament. He was one of the leading figures within the party to initiate and implement the institutional reforms of the youth organization of the Mongolian People's Revolutionary Party.

Khürelsükh established the Mongolian Democratic Socialist Youth Federation, the re-organized youth wing of the MPRP, and served as its president two times, between 1997–1999, and from 2000–2005. In 2000, he was elected to the Governing Board of MPRP, which is the core decision-making body of MPRP. In 2008, Khürelsükh was elected as Secretary General of MPRP. In 2010, under the leadership of Sükhbaataryn Batbold, Chairman of MPRP and in cooperation with similar-minded party colleagues, Khürelsükh championed the process of restoring the original name of the party – Mongolian People's Party, which was changed to "Mongolian People's Revolutionary Party" in 1924 by the recommendation of Comintern in order to demonstrate the solidarity with socialist parties at that time.

=== 2021 presidential campaign ===
Results of the 2021 presidential election. Red highlights areas where Khürelsükh won.

On May 2, the Mongolian People's Party nominated Khürelsükh as its candidate for the June 9 presidential election. Khürelsükh was unanimously chosen during the MPP's conference virtually held in Ulaanbaatar on Sunday. On May 24, Khürelsükh started his official campaign from his home province of Khentii. Ahead of the election, Khürelsükh was ranked as the most popular politician in the country in a MEC poll. On 9 June 2021, Khürelsükh won a landslide victory with 72% of the vote in the three-way race. Other than the diaspora vote, he won all the provinces and districts with a majority vote. In contrast, the candidate with the second-highest vote, Dangaasürengiin Enkhbat, received only 20%.

== Presidency (2021–2026) ==
=== Inauguration ===
Khürelsükh was inaugurated on 25 June 2021 at 11:40 am in the Great Hall of the State Palace. Preceding the ceremony, Khürelsükh, accompanied by his spouse, paid respects to the Statue of Chinggis Khaan in front of the palace.

=== Ceremonial public actions ===
On 4 July 2021, Khürelsükh attended the first flight during the opening ceremony of Chinggis Khaan International Airport.

=== Presidential appointees ===
Khürelsükh with Deputy prime minister Sainbuyangiin Amarsaikhan and presidential advisors on 20 June 2025

On 25 June, Khürelsükh issued a decree on appointing Yangugiin Sodbaatar as the Chief of Staff of the Office of the President and Jadambyn Enkhbayar as the Secretary of the National Security Council. Khürelsükh also issued an order on 28 June appointing the following advisor posts:

- A. Byambajargal – Advisor on Legal Policy
- B. Davaadalai – Advisor on Economic Policy
- E. Odbayar – Advisor on Foreign Policy
- D. Bum-Ochir – Advisor on Cultural and Religious Policy
- C. Lodoiravsal – Advisor on Technological Policy

=== Tenure ===
During Khürelsükh's tenure, it was speculated by several political analysts and local media that the president was seeking a second term despite constitutional restrictions. On 18 May 2025, during the unravelling of the 2025 anti-corruption protests against the prime minister, the Presidential Press Office announced that President Khürelsükh would not seek a second term in the 2027 presidential election.

On 2 June 2025, Khürelsükh, after receiving the Turkmen president, made a surprise late-night appearance during a vote of confidence on incumbent prime minister Luvsannamsrain Oyun-Erdene, who by then became the longest-serving prime minister in modern Mongolian history. In his address to parliament, Khürelsükh firmly stated that "not individuals, but laws must govern. I don't understand who is talking about Mongolia shifting to a presidential system." and vowed "not to lay a finger on the constitution" in pursuit of another term as President. He urged "As an elder brother, I advise: Do not deflect responsibility, mislead the public, or avoid accountability," in a remark widely interpreted as a warning to prime minister Oyun-Erdene. On 3 June 2025, Oyun-Erdene lost the motion of confidence with 44 MPs in support and 38 MPs against him, failing to meet the threshold of 64 MPs.

On 20 October 2025, Khürelsükh vetoed the dismissal of Gombojavyn Zandanshatar as prime minister by the State Great Khural, citing procedural errors. Zandanshatar, nominated as prime minister by Khürelsükh in June 2025, continued to serve as head of government until his resignation on 27 March 2026.

==== Resignation ====
On 17 November 2026, Khürelsükh announced his resignation in a press statement amid unravelling corruption allegations. The resignation came after a meeting of the minority caucus of the Democratic Party the prior day, during which he and other prominent MPP figures were accused of financially benefiting from the state railway. Three days prior to the resignation announcement on 14 November, he was accused by former Ulaanbaatar mayor Khishgeegiin Nyambaatar of taking US$25 million in bribes in connection with the construction of the Tavantolgoi–Gashuunsukhait railway. Khürelsükh stated in the statement that he agreed with the opposition demand for him to step down and be investigated. He added that he was prepared to "undergo an investigation and restore his reputation."

His resignation was accepted (96–8) by the State Great Khural on 19 November 2026, formally relieving him of his presidential duties. Under Mongolian law, the parliament's speaker, Sandagiin Byambatsogt (MPP), assumed the presidential duties as acting officeholder until a new president is elected and inaugurated within four months. Khürelsükh became the first Mongolian president to leave office voluntarily before completing his term. Consequently, the next presidential election, scheduled to be held in May-June 2027, must be now held in early 2027.

=== Foreign policy ===
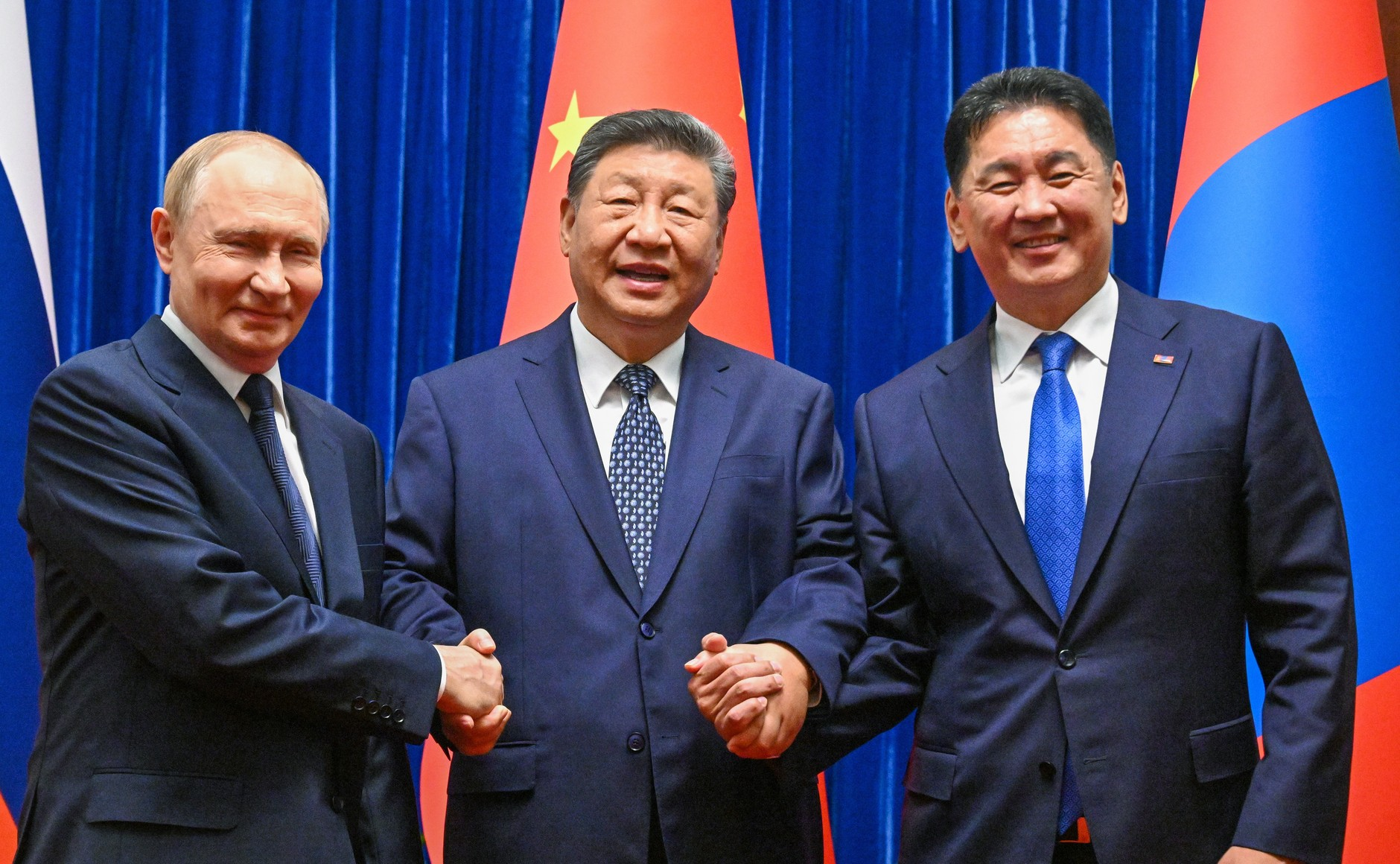
Khürelsükh with Russian president Vladimir Putin and Chinese president Xi Jinping during a trilateral meeting on 2 September 2025

In September 2022, Khürelsükh arrived in Samarkand, Uzbekistan, to attend the 22nd meeting of the Council of Heads of State of the Shanghai Cooperation Organisation (SCO). He took part in a trilateral meeting with Russian president Vladimir Putin and Chinese president Xi Jinping. At the 80th session of the United Nations General Assembly in 2025, he delivered a speech that mostly praised horses.

Khürelsükh with US Secretary of State Antony Blinken in Ulaanbaatar, August 2024

On 31 August 2026, Khürelsükh attended in the 26th meeting of the SCO Council of Heads of State and the opening ceremony of the 2026 World Nomad Games, held in Bishkek, Kyrgyzstan. Alongside the SCO summit, Khürelsükh separately met with Chinese president Xi Jinping and Kyrgyz president Sadyr Japarov on 31 August. Later on 1 September, president Khurelsukh met with Russian president Putin in Bishkek. During the meeting, the two sides discussed on the implementation of several energy and transport projects.

==== Central Asia ====
During his tenure, Khürelsükh has made several state visits to Central Asian countries since 2023. These trips were seen by both international and domestic analysts as a broader strategic bolstering of Mongolia's relations with Central Asia as part of the Third Neighbor Policy.

In July 2023, Khürelsükh welcomed the president of the Kyrgyz Republic, Sadyr Japarov, to Ulaanbaatar. Later in 2024, Khürelsükh toured the capitals of Kazakhstan, Uzbekistan, and Turkmenistan between June and October of 2024. After his state visit, Khürelsükh greeted the president of Kazakhstan, Kassym-Jomart Tokayev, in Mongolia and established a strategic partnership between the two countries. The next year, in June 2025, Mongolia welcomed Serdar Berdimuhamedow and Shavkat Mirziyoyev, the leaders of Turkmenistan and Uzbekistan; the first-ever visits by a Turkmen and Uzbek leader. Relations with Uzbekistan were elevated to a comprehensive partnership during president Mirziyoyev's visit. A month later, Khürelsükh visited Tajikistan and Kyrgyzstan, where he and Kyrgyz president Japarov jointly declared a comprehensive partnership in July 2025.

Within two years, Khürelsükh, as president, made state visits to all of the Central Asian countries and received four of the five leaders in Ulaanbaatar. He became the first Mongolian sitting president to visit Uzbekistan, Tajikistan and Turkmenistan.

==== International trips as president ====
List of foreign visits by Ukhnaagiin Khürelsükh
Date	Country	City	Type of visit/Reason for visit
19–23 September 2021	United States	New York	76th United Nations General Assembly
15–18 December 2021	Russia	Moscow	State visit
14–17 September 2022	Uzbekistan	Samarkand	22nd SCO summit
7–8 November 2022	Egypt	Sharm El Sheikh	COP27
27–28 November 2022	China	Beijing	State visit
29 November 2022	Japan	Tokyo	State visit
6 May 2023	United Kingdom	London	Coronation of Charles III and Camilla
15–17 September 2023	Cuba	Havana	Group of 77 summit
20–22 September 2023	United States	New York	78th United Nations General Assembly
10–14 October 2023	France	Paris	State visit
17–20 October 2023	China	Beijing	Belt and Road Forum
1–5 November 2023	Vietnam	Hanoi	State visit
5–7 November 2023	Laos	Vientiane	State visit
28 November–1 December 2023	United Arab Emirates	Dubai	COP28
23–26 June 2024	Uzbekistan	Tashkent	State visit
3–5 July 2024	Kazakhstan	Astana	24th SCO summit
26 July 2024	France	Paris	Opening ceremony of the 2024 Summer Olympics
10–13 October 2024	Turkmenistan	Ashgabat	State visit
11–13 November 2024	Azerbaijan	Baku	COP29
15–19 January 2025	Turkey	Ankara	State visit
9–12 March 2025	Czechia	Prague	State visit
13–14 March 2025	Poland	Warsaw	State visit
7–10 May 2025	Russia	Moscow	Victory Day Parade
20–23 July 2025	Kyrgyz Republic	Bishkek	State visit
23–26 July 2025	Tajikistan	Dushanbe	State visit
31 August–3 September 2025	China	Tianjin	25th SCO summit and 80th Victory Day Parade
22–24 September 2025	United States	New York	80th United Nations General Assembly
13–16 October 2025	India	New Delhi	State visit
1–3 December 2025	Italy	Rome	State visit
4–5 December 2025	Vatican City	Vatican City	State visit
20–23 April 2026	Kazakhstan	Astana	State visit
30 August–2 September 2026	Kyrgyz Republic	Bishkek, Cholpon-Ata	26th SCO summit and the opening ceremony of the VI World Nomad Games
21–24 September 2026	United States	New York, Chicago	81st United Nations General Assembly and meeting with the Mongolian diaspora in Chicago
19–22 October 2026	Germany	Berlin	State visit
22–24 October 2026	Finland	Helsinki	State visit
24–26 October 2026	Belarus	Minsk	State visit

== Summary list of high government/party positions ==
- President of Mongolia (2021–2026)
- Commander-in-Chief of the Mongolian Armed Forces (2021–2026)
- Prime Minister of Mongolia (2017–2021)
- Deputy Prime Minister of Mongolia (2016–2017)
- Chairman of the Mongolian People's Party (2017–2021)
- Secretary-General of the Mongolian People's Party (2008–2012)
- Minister for Professional Inspection (2006–2008)
- Minister for Emergency Situations (2004–2006)
- Head of the Social Democratic Mongolian Youth Union (1997–2004)

== Personal life ==
Khürelsükh is married and has two daughters. His wife is a kindergarten teacher, while his eldest daughter is a human rights lecturer at a university. Khürelsükh's younger sibling, Ukhnaagiin Otgonbayar, was elected a member of the expanded State Great Khural in 2024. After taking oath, Otganbayar greeted his brother, who took his presidential seat in the back of the assembly hall, during the plenary sesion. He enjoys playing guitar with his band called 'Pals', which was formed when he turned 50. The former prime minister is also an avid motorbike fan.

== Awards and honors ==
=== National awards ===
- Mongolia: Order of the Polar Star
- Mongolia: Order of the Red Banner of Labour

=== Foreign awards ===
- Kazakhstan: Order of the Golden Eagle (20 April 2026)

=== International honours ===
- United Nations: Asian Champion for Disaster Risk Reduction (26 May 2017)

== Electoral history ==
Khürelsükh served as member of parliament consecutively from 2000 to 2008, and briefly served as lawmaker without completing his full term in 2012 and from 2020 to 2021.

Election	Constituency	Party	Votes	Result
2000	51st, Khentii Province	MPRP	5,509	Elected
2004	51st, Khentii Province	MPRP	4,748	Elected
2012	Closed party list (#2)	MPP	—N/a	Elected
2020	18th, Khentii Province	MPP	25,356	Elected

=== Presidential election ===
Election	Party	Votes	%	Results
2021	Mongolian People's Party	823,326	67.76%	Elected

== See also ==
- Cabinet of Ukhnaagiin Khürelsükh

== Notes ==
Political offices
Preceded by Jargaltulgyn Erdenebat	Prime Minister of Mongolia; 2017–2021	Succeeded by Luvsannamsrain Oyun-Erdene
Preceded by Khaltmaagiin Battulga	President of Mongolia; 2021–2026	Succeeded by Sandagiin Byambatsogt (acting)
