= President of Mongolia =

Head of state

- Монгол Улсын Ерөнхийлөгч ᠮᠣᠩᠭᠣᠯ ᠤᠯᠤᠰ ‍ᠣ‍ᠨ ᠶᠡᠷᠦᠨᠭᠬᠡᠢᠯᠡᠭᠴᠢ
- State Emblem of Mongolia

- Incumbent; Sandagiin Byambatsogt; Acting since 19 November 2026
- Style: His Excellency
- Type: Head of state Commander-in-chief
- Status: Executive President
- Member of: National Security Council
- Residence: President's Residence at the Ikh Tenger Complex
- Seat: Government Palace
- Nominator: State Great Khural; Political parties with representation nominate candidates
- Appointer: Direct popular vote
- Term length: Six years, non renewable
- Constituting instrument: Constitution of Mongolia (1992)
- Precursor: President of the Mongolian People's Republic
- Inaugural holder: Punsalmaagiin Ochirbat
- Formation: Constitutional amendments: 10 May 1990; 36 years ago; First inauguration: 3 September 1990; 36 years ago; Modern status defined: 12 February 1992; 34 years ago
- Deputy: Vice President of Mongolia (1990–1992); Chairman of the State Great Khural (1992–present)
- Salary: ₮82,393,920 / US$24,304 annually (2024)
- Website: president.mn

The president of Mongolia (Note: Mongolian: Монгол Улсын Ерөнхийлөгч, romanized: Mongol Ulsiin Yörönkhiilögch, pronounced [ˌmɔɴɢɞ̆ɮ oɬˌsʲiŋ jɵɾɵ̆ɲˈçʲiɮɵk(ə)t͡ɕʰ]) is the executive head of state of Mongolia and commander-in-chief of the Mongolian Armed Forces. The president also chairs the National Security Council, a consultative body to the president on the matters of national security.

After the 1990 Democratic Revolution and the country's first free and fair elections, the office of the President of the Mongolian People's Republic (MPR) was established in September 1990 with Punsalmaagiin Ochirbat as its inaugural holder. Later on 12 February 1992, following the adoption of a new constitution, the post was superseded by its modern form. Ochirbat remained as inaugural president until he was democratically elected into the office in 1993, becoming the first democratic head of state of Mongolia.

According to the Constitution of Mongolia, the president is elected to a single six-year term by direct popular vote in a two-round system. Prior to the 2019 constitutional amendments, which took effect in May 2020, the presidential term was limited to a maximum of two four-year terms. The sixth president, Ukhnaagiin Khürelsükh, was elected in the June 2021 presidential election and was relieved of his duties by the State Great Khural (parliament) on 19 November 2026. The duties of the president are temporarily carried out by Sandagiin Byambatsogt, the Chairman of the State Great Khural, until a new president is elected within four months.

== Election and term ==
In order to be registered to contest the election, a candidate must be an indigenous Mongolian citizen, be at least 50 years old on the day of the election, and have permanently resided in Mongolia for at least five years. Candidates are nominated by political parties with representation in the State Great Khural (parliament), but the president-elect must suspend their position in any other office or employment before assuming the office.

The president was originally limited to two four-year terms, but this was changed to a non-renewable six-year term starting with the 2021 presidential election. Presidential elections are conducted by nationwide direct popular vote. If no candidate achieves an absolute majority of votes cast, a runoff is held between the top two candidates. If no candidate receives a majority of all votes cast in the second round, fresh elections will be held.

=== Latest election ===
Second place by administrative divisions: Khürelsükh Enkhbat Erdene Blank

Polls opened at 07:00 in 2,087 polling stations across the country for the 2 million registered voters, with special measures in place due to the COVID-19 pandemic in Mongolia. Voting ended at 22:00. Khürelsükh and Erdene voted in Ulaanbaatar, while Enkhbat tested positive for COVID-19 and voted in the hospital.

Candidate	Party	Votes	%
Ukhnaagiin Khürelsükh	Mongolian People's Party	823,326	67.76
Dangaasürengiin Enkhbat	Right Person Electorate Coalition	246,968	20.33
Sodnomzunduin Erdene	Democratic Party	72,832	5.99
Blank votes		71,937	5.92
Total		1,215,063	100.00
Total votes		1,215,063	–
Registered voters/turnout		2,049,379	59.29
Source: General Election Commission

Vote share
Khürelsükh	67.76%
Enkhbat	20.33%
Erdene	5.99%
Blank votes	5.92%

Results of Khürelsükh by administrative divisions

Results of Enkhbat by administrative divisions

Results of Erdene by administrative divisions

=== By area ===
Subdivision	Ukhnaagiin Khürelsükh MPP		Dangaasürengiin Enkhbat RPEC		Sodnomzunduin Erdene DP	
Subdivision	Votes	%	Votes	%	Votes	%
Aimags of Mongolia
Arkhangai	23,870	69.85%	3,046	8.91%	6,186	18.10%
Bayan-Ölgii	29,474	81.53%	1,616	4.47%	2,636	7.29%
Bayankhongor	23,522	74.60%	2,507	7.95%	1,898	6.02%
Bulgan	17,825	78.34%	2,290	10.06%	1,401	6.16%
Govi-Altai	18,336	84.60%	1,640	7.57%	1,099	5.07%
Govisümber	5,032	76.87%	846	12.92%	414	6.32%
Dornogovi	20,434	74.62%	4,336	15.83%	1,476	5.39%
Dornod	21,291	73.98%	4,292	14.91%	1,433	4.98%
Dundgovi	12,786	79.06%	1,726	10.67%	856	5.29%
Zavkhan	22,058	76.21%	3,220	11.12%	1,915	6.62%
Övörkhangai	32,879	79.32%	4,284	10.33%	1,915	4.62%
Ömnögovi	17,870	74.16%	3,170	13.16	1,625	6.74%
Sükhbaatar	23,215	87.28%	1,356	5.10%	880	3.31%
Selenge	25,149	69.93%	5,901	16.41%	2,401	6.68%
Töv	26,481	78.38%	4,073	12.05%	1,560	4.62%
Uvs	23,642	77.49%	2,689	8.81%	1,063	3.48%
Khovd	24,366	73.96%	4,176	12.68%	3,349	10.17%
Khövsgöl	32,931	68.11%	7,937	16.42%	4,901	10.14%
Khentii	26,356	82.52%	2,393	7.49%	2,361	7.39%
Darkhan-Uul	24,714	67.46%	7,764	21.19%	1,628	4.44%
Orkhon	27,408	68.94%	7,962	20.03%	1,530	3.85%
Düüregs of Ulaanbaatar
Khan-Uul	43,237	53.80%	27,890	34.70%	4,063	5.06%
Baganuur	7,940	72.43%	1,920	17.52%	670	6.11%
Bagakhangai	1,492	84.53%	155	8.78%	65	3.68%
Bayanzürkh	82,796	59.32%	42,414	30.39%	5,627	4.03%
Nalaikh	10,309	72.51%	2,570	18.08%	667	4.69%
Sükhbaatar	32,710	56.74%	18,090	31.38%	3,193	5.54%
Chingeltei	35,830	61.69%	15,680	27.00%	2,757	4.75%
Bayangol	48,954	52.61%	30,249	32.51%	8,361	8.99%
Songino Khairkhan	79,244	67.34%	26,692	22.68%	4,742	4.03%
Overseas	1,175	21.10%	4,084	73.35%	160	2.87%
Total	823,326	67.76%	246,968	20.33%	72,832	5.99%

== Powers of the president ==
The Constitution of Mongolia, adopted in 1992, states that the president is the "head of state and embodiment of the unity of the Mongolian people".

- Nominating a candidate for the office of Prime Minister, who is then approved or rejected by the State Great Khural (parliament). This is a ceremonial responsibility, as the Khural will most likely reject any nominee who is not its own choice – in effect, the prime minister is appointed by the Khural.
- Dissolving the State Great Khural if it fails to appoint the prime minister within 45 days after the president submitted a proposal on appointment to parliament, or if it fails to appoint within 30 days after the resignation of the previous prime minister.
- Vetoing the State Great Khural's legislation (can be overridden with a two-thirds majority)
- Approving judicial appointments
- Appointing the chief judge of the Supreme Court of Mongolia
- Chairing the National Security Council of Mongolia
- Represent the State with full authority in foreign relations, and, in concurrence with the State Great Khural, to conclude international treaties on behalf of Mongolia.
- Appoint and recall the heads of plenipotentiary missions of Mongolia to foreign countries, in concurrence with the State Great Khural.
- Acting as commander-in-chief of the armed forces.
- Nominates the prosecutor general, the official in charge of implementing the laws, who is then approved or rejected by the State Great Khural.
- Provides guidelines for the activities of the Government.

== Residences ==
Generally, Mongolian leaders have lived at the president's residence at the Ikh Tenger Complex (Mongolian: Их тэнгэр цогцолбор). The complex is a protected area in the Bogd Khan Mountain. The residence is located next to the mansions of the Speaker of Parliament and Prime Minister.

=== Winter Palace ===
In 2017, newly elected president Khaltmaagiin Battulga said that he intended to live in the "Winter Palace" in central Ulaanbaatar, also known as the marshal's residence, in a departure from tradition. It is located in the heart of the capital between Peace Avenue and Seoul Street (next to the 1st School and the Russian Embassy). The two-story building was built in 1947 as the residence of Marshal Khorloogiin Choibalsan. It has two luxury rooms and five other rooms as well as 52 to 80-person capacity banqueting hall.

== Removal ==
The president can be removed from office if two-thirds of the State Great Khural find them guilty of abusing their powers or violating their oath on the basis of the findings of the Constitutional Court of Mongolia.

== Succession ==
According to Article 37 of the Constitution of Mongolia, in the temporary absence of the president, his/her powers shall be exercised by the Chairman of the State Great Khural.

In the event of the resignation, death or voluntary retirement of the President, the presidential powers shall be exercised by the Chairman of the State Great Khural until the inauguration of a newly elected President. In such cases, the State Great Khural shall announce and hold presidential elections within four months.

The procedure of the exercising the presidential duties by the parliamentary speaker shall be determined by law.

== Symbols ==
The state emblem of Mongolia is the primary symbol of the Office of the President of Mongolia. Additionally, the state seal is held by the president and is used to authenticate official documents.

State emblem of Mongolia

State seal of Mongolia

== Timeline ==
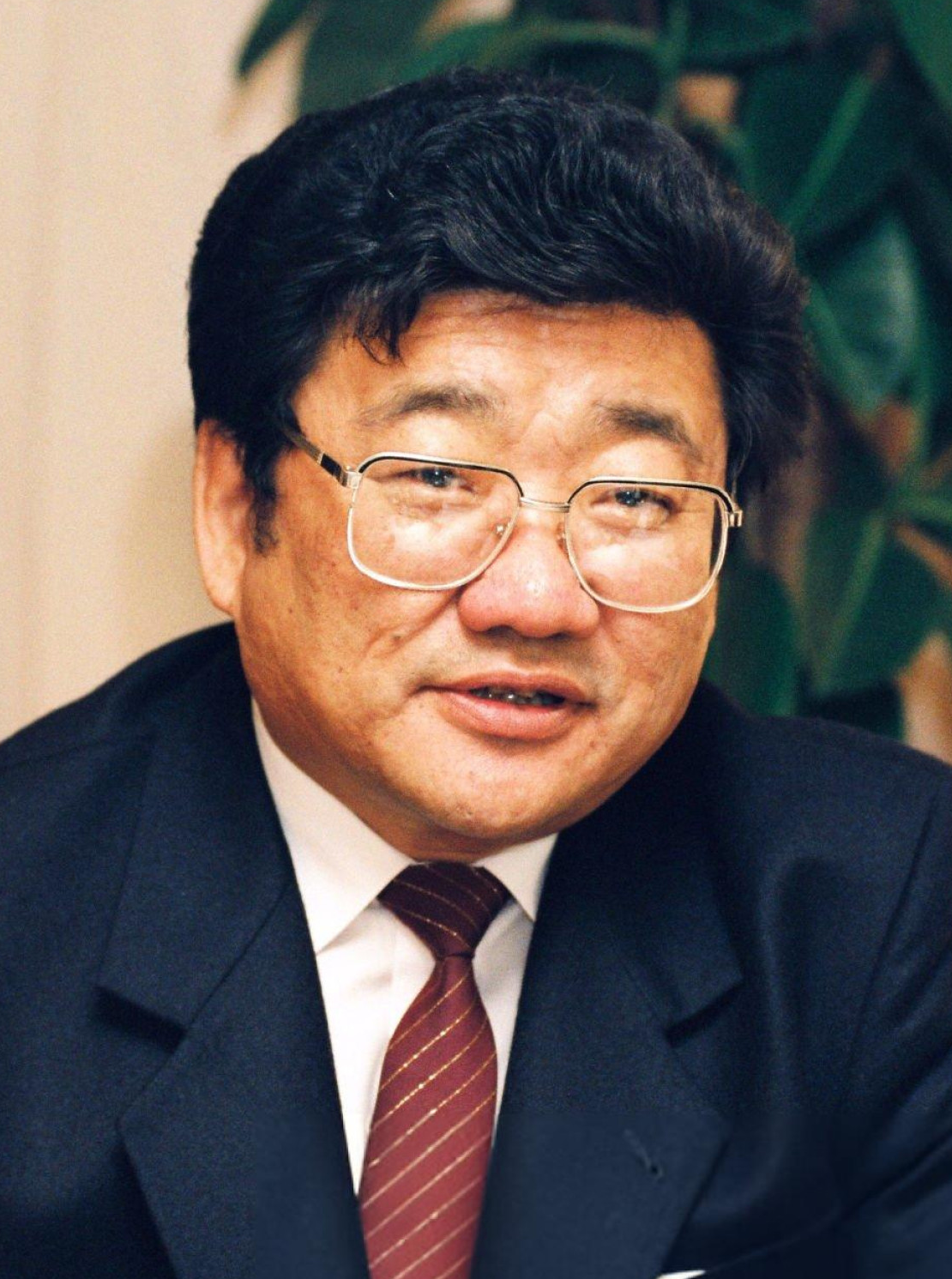
1st: Punsalmaagiin Ochirbat
1st term
(served: 1990–1997)

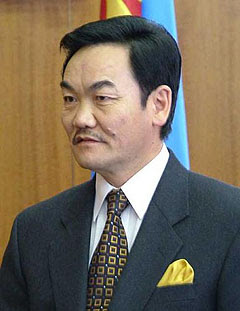
2nd: Natsagiin Bagabandi
2nd & 3rd terms
(served: 1997–2005)

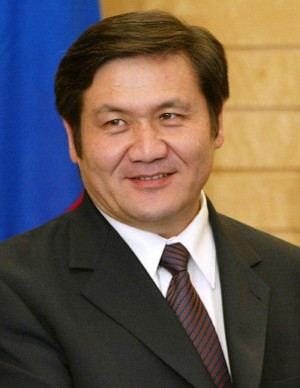
3rd: Nambaryn Enkhbayar
4th term
(served: 2005–2009)

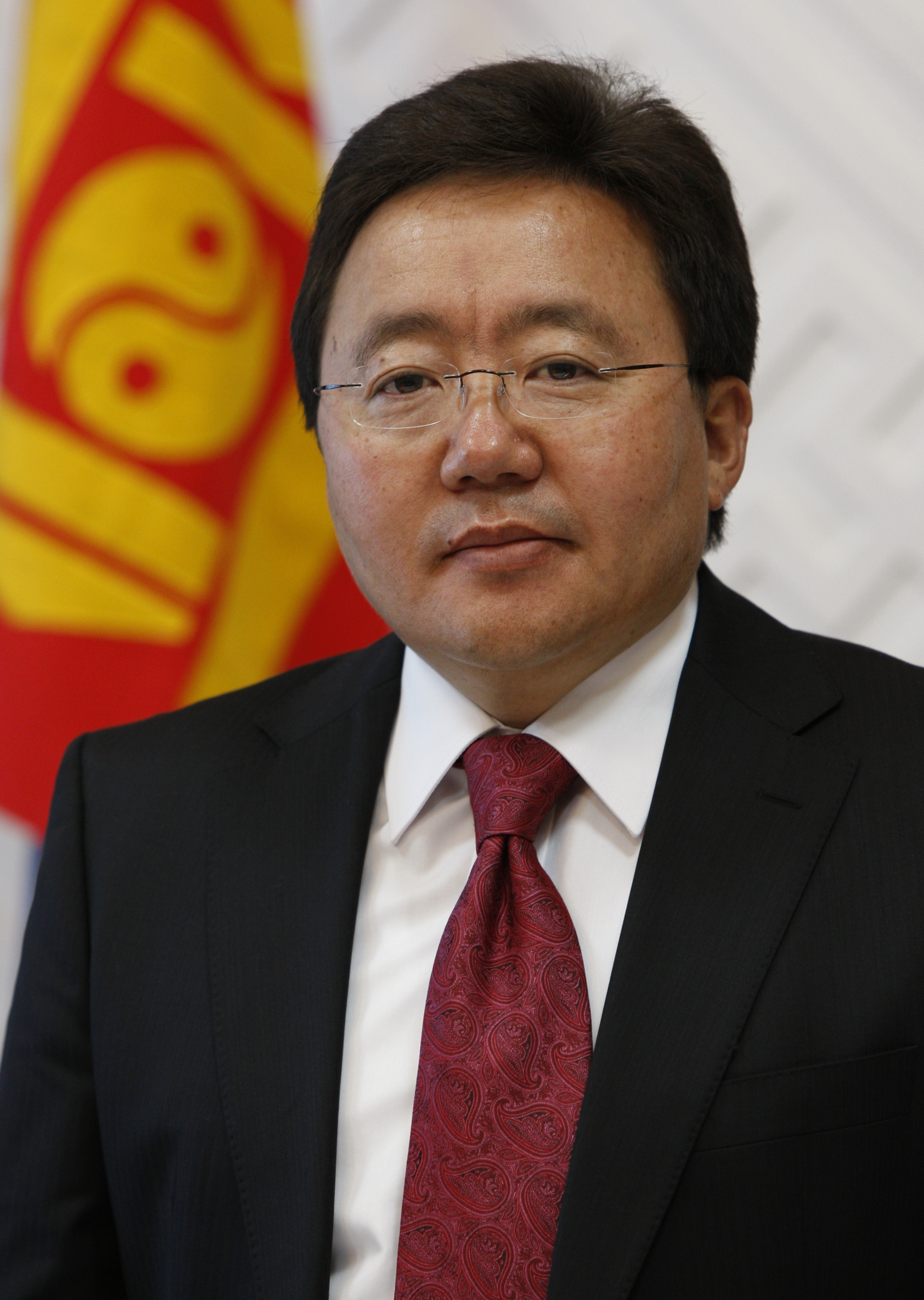
4th: Tsakhiagiin Elbegdorj
5th & 6th terms
(served: 2009–2017)

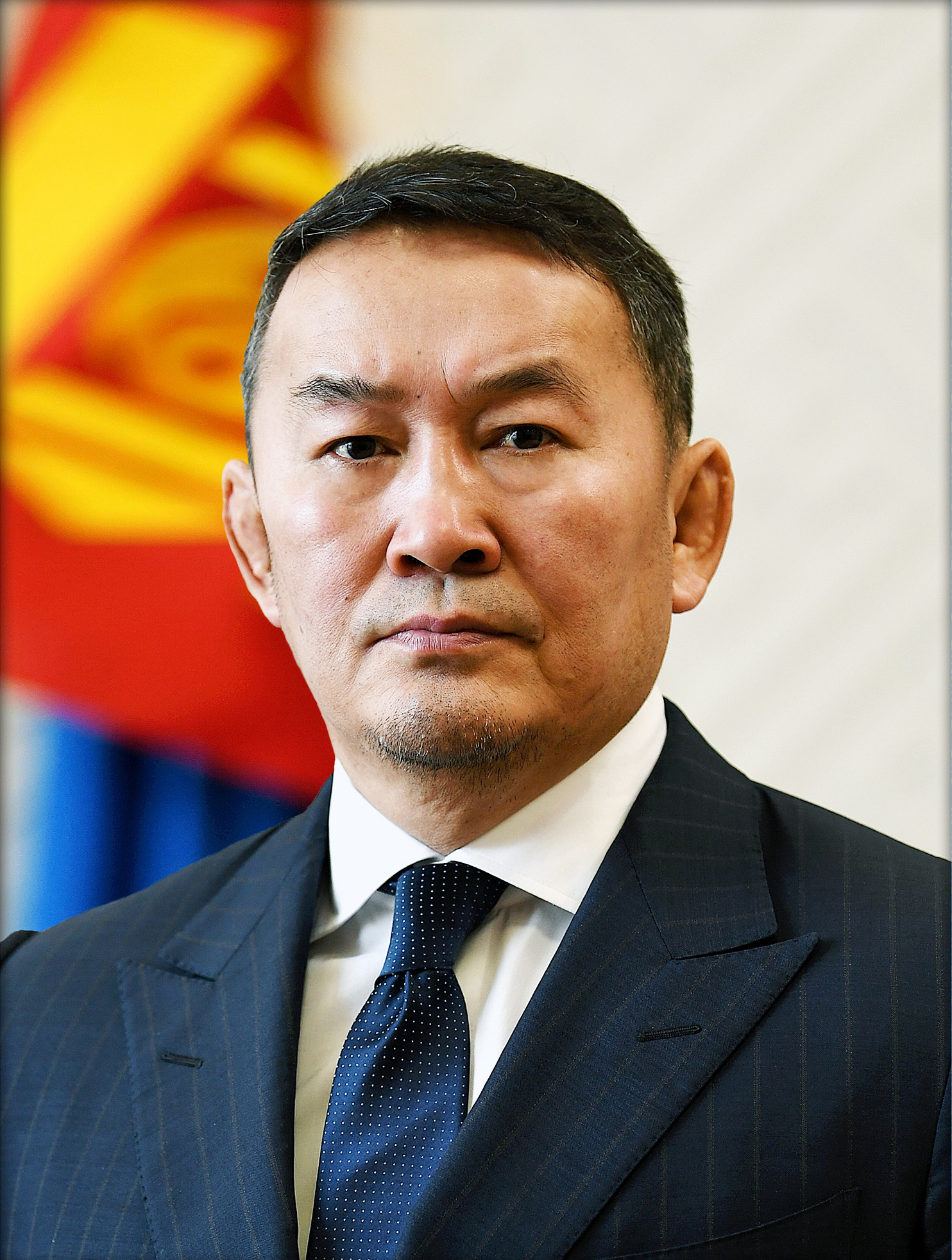
5th: Khaltmaagiin Battulga
7th term
(served: 2017–2021)

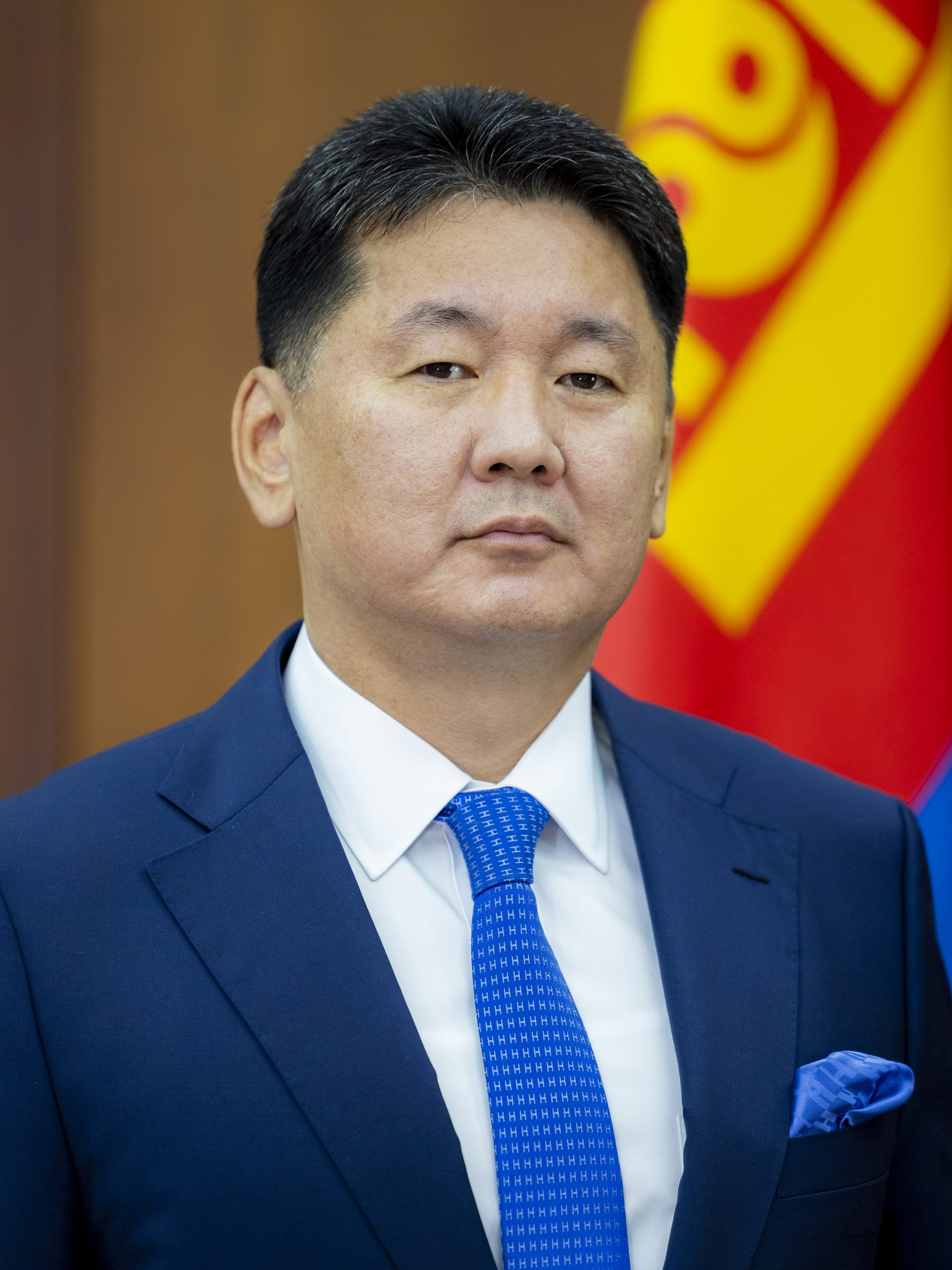
6th: Ukhnaagiin Khürelsükh
8th term
(served: 2021–2026)

Acting: Sandagiin Byambatsogt
(serving: 2026–present)

== See also ==
- List of heads of state of Mongolia
- Chairman of the State Great Khural
- Prime Minister of Mongolia
- First Lady of Mongolia

== Bibliography ==
- Mongolia. Ulaanbaatar, Mongolia: Montsame News Agency. 2006. ISBN 99929-0-627-8.
