= Oyungerel Tsedevdamba =

Mongolian politician

Oyungerel Tsedevdamba (Mongolian: Цэдэвдамбын Оюунгэрэл, romanized: Tsedevdambyn Oyuungerel; born 26 October 1966 in the Tarialan district of the Mongolian People's Republic) was an assistant to Tsakhiagiin Elbegdorj when he was the Deputy Speaker of the Parliament of Mongolia and later was promoted to a policy advisor for human rights and public participation to the President of Mongolia, Tsakhiagiin Elbegdorj. Oyungerel is a chairman of the Civic Unity Participation Party (Mongolia) and former minister of culture, tourism and sports, as well as a former member of the Mongolian Parliament and a Leader of the project "Let's change our toilets."

== Education ==
Oyungerel attended Stanford and Yale Universities, as well as the Moscow International Business School and Sverdlovsk State Academy of Sciences. She was Stanford's first Mongolian student, enrolling in 2003 at age 36 in the master's program in international policy studies.

== Career ==
Oyungerel's work has included helping pass laws addressing domestic violence and protecting cultural heritage sites, home to Mongolian indigenous people, as well as working to stop smugglers from illegally removing dinosaur fossils from Mongolia. Her interest in dinosaurs began in 2006 with a visit to the American Museum of Natural History, which displayed Mongolian dinosaur fossils the guide said would be returned to Mongolia if the country had a museum to display them.

In 2009, her book Shadow of the Red Star (later titled The Green Eyed Lama) was longlisted for the Man Asian Literary Prize. The sequel, Sixty White Sheep, was published in Mongolian in 2017.

== Personal life ==
Oyungerel has two children.
