= Jargalsaikhan Dambadarjaa =

Mongolian economist, television host, and political commentator

- Дамбадаржаагийн Жаргалсайхан
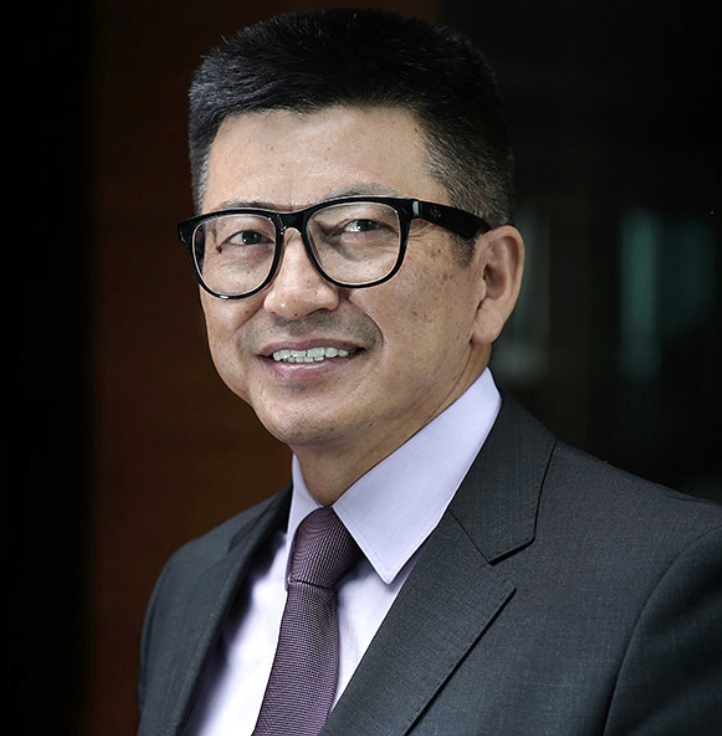
- Born: Ulaanbaatar, Mongolia
- Education: Moscow State University (Diplom); Daniels College of Business, University of Denver (MBA)
- Political party: Unaffiliated
- Awards: Transparency International-Mongolia 2017 Transparency Award

Jargalsaikhan Dambadarjaa (Mongolian: Дамбадаржаагийн Жаргалсайхан, Dambadarjaagiĭn Jargalsaĭkhan; also known as Jargal or Jargal Defacto) is a Mongolian economist, television host, writer, and political commentator. He is the founder of the Ulaanbaatar-based think tank the Defacto Institute.

== Education and early career ==
Jargalsaikhan attended the university of Tashkent as a Russian language student before transferring to Moscow State University where he graduated with a diploma in economics in 1984. He was part of the pro-democracy activist group during Mongolia's 1990 democratic revolution. In 2002, he completed his MBA from the Daniels College of Business at the University of Denver, and later served as president of the Economic Club of Ulaanbaatar.

== Defacto media ==
Jargalsaikhan operates the Defacto media organization which includes the media portal JargalDefacto.com. Since 2009 his commentaries have appeared weekly in both Mongolian and English-language news outlets.

He is the host of three nationally televised programs in Mongolia, including the Defacto Interview (Дэфакто Ярилцлага), the Defacto Review (Дефакто Тойм), and the Defacto Debates (Дефакто Мэтгэлцээн).

Jargalsaikhan also hosts the Mongolian-language “Defacto Radio” show on Business Radio 98.9FM in Ulaanbaatar.

== Publications ==
=== Books ===
- 2014: The Creation of New Wealth: Discussions on a Transitional Economy (ISBN 978-99973-955-1-1)
- 2014: Our Country Is in Our Hands: Discussions on Society and Role of Individuals (ISBN 978-99973-955-0-4)
- 2014: The Secret of Smart Government: Discussions on the Making of Good Public Governance (ISBN 978-99973-955-2-8)
- 2019: Economic Freedom: Articles on the Economy
- 2019: Individual Freedom: Articles on Society and the Individual
- 2019: Political Freedom: Articles on Public Governance
