= Cabinet of Ukhnaagiin Khürelsükh =

Second Cabinet of Ukhnaagiin Khurelsukh Cabinet Khurelsukh II
- 16th Cabinet of Mongolia
- 8 July 2020 – 21 January 2021 (until 29 January 2021 as caretaker government)
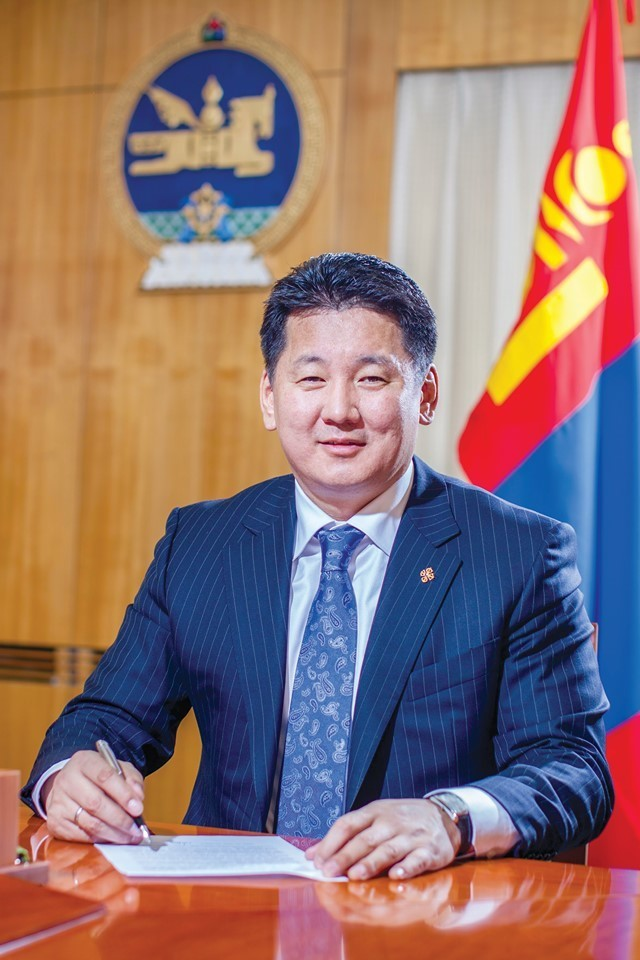
- Prime Minister Ukhnaagiin Khurelsukh in 2020
- Date formed: 8 July 2020
- Date dissolved: 21 January 2021

People and organisations
- Head of state: Khaltmaagiin Battulga
- Head of government: Ukhnaagiin Khürelsükh
- Deputy head of government: Yangugiin Sodbaatar
- No. of ministers: 17
- Ministers removed: 16
- Member party: Mongolian People's Party
- Status in legislature: Supermajority; 62 / 76 (81.6%)
- Opposition party: Democratic Party; Mongolian People's Revolutionary Party; National Labour Party

History
- Election: 2020 election
- Legislature terms: 8th State Great Khural
- Predecessor: Khurelsukh I (2017–2020)
- Successor: Oyun-Erdene I

The Cabinet of Ukhnaagiin Khürelsükh, was established following the 2017 Mongolian presidential election, and the election by the Mongolian parliament of Ukhnaagiin Khürelsükh to the office of the Prime Minister of Mongolia on 4 October 2017. The cabinet was submitted for approval on 13 October, and sworn in on 18 October

On June 24, 2020, Mongolian People's Party was re-elected to the parliament with a landslide victory.

On July 7, 2020, the Mongolian parliament approved Khürelsükh's cabinet structure of 14 ministries: six general and eight functional. The Ministry of Education, Culture, Science and Sports was split into Ministry of Education and Science and Ministry of Culture. The total ministers are 17: Prime Minister, Deputy Prime Minister, Cabinet Secretary, and the heads of the 14 ministries. Following the protests on January 20, U. Khurelsukh's government decided to resign at its own request. Parliamentary debates began on January 27 with the support of the President of Mongolia to elect L.Oyun-Erdene as the 32nd Prime Minister.

The new cabinet, composed largely of technocrats and non-politicians, was confirmed and sworn in this week, signaling a potential shift towards a more technocratic approach to governance. Notably, recent constitutional amendments barring lawmakers from holding cabinet positions have contributed to the influx of new faces.

== Cabinet officers ==
Per listing on Mongolia Weekly, Montsame and Mongolian Focus

- Deputy Prime Minister:
  - O Enkhtuvshin (2017–2020);
  - Yangugiin Sodbaatar (2020–present)
- Cabinet Secretary
  - Luvsannamsrain Oyun-Erdene (2017–present)
- Ministry of Finance
  - Ch. Khurelbaatar (2017–present)
- Ministry of Justice and Internal Affairs
  - Ts Nyamdorj (2017–2020)
  - Khishgeegiin Nyambaatar (2020–2023)
- Ministry of Defense
  - Nyamaagiin Enkhbold (2017–2020)
  - Gürsediin Saikhanbayar (2020–present)
- Ministry of Construction and Urban Development
  - Kh Badelkhan (2017–2020)
  - B. Munkhbaatar (2020–present)
- Ministry of Mining and Heavy Industry
  - D Sumiyabazar (2017–2020)
  - G. Yondon (2020–present)
- Ministry of Education and Science
  - Lkhagvyn Tsedevsuren (2020–present)
- Ministry of Environment and Tourism
  - N Tserenbat (2017–2020)
  - Davaajantsangiin Sarangerel (2020–present)
- Ministry of Culture
  - S. Chuluun (2020–present)
- Ministry of Foreign Affairs
  - D Tsogtbaatar (2017–2020)
  - N. Enkhtaivan (2020–present)
- Ministry of Road and Transport Development
  - J Bat-Erdene (2017–2018)
  - Ya Sodbaatar (2018–2019)
  - B Enkhamgalan (2019–2020)
  - L. Khaltar (2020–present)
- Ministry of Energy:
  - Ts Davaasuren (2017–2020)
  - N. Tavinbekh (2020–present)
- Ministry of Food, Agriculture and Light Industry
  - S Batzorig (2017–2019)
  - Ch Ulaan (2019–2020)
  - Z. Mendsaikhan (2020–present)
- Ministry of Health
  - D. Sarangerel (2017–2020)
  - T. Munkhsaikhan (2020–present)
- Ministry of Labor and Social Protection
  - S Chinzorig (2017–2020)
  - A. Ariunzaya (2020–present)

=== Former ministries ===
- Ministry of Culture, Education, and Sports (before 2020): Ts Tsogzolma (2017–2019); Yo Baatarbileg (2019–2020);
