= Ministry of Urban Development, Construction and Housing (Mongolia) =

Government ministry of Mongolia

Ministry of Construction and Urban Development
- Монгол Улсын Барилга, хот байгуулалтын яам

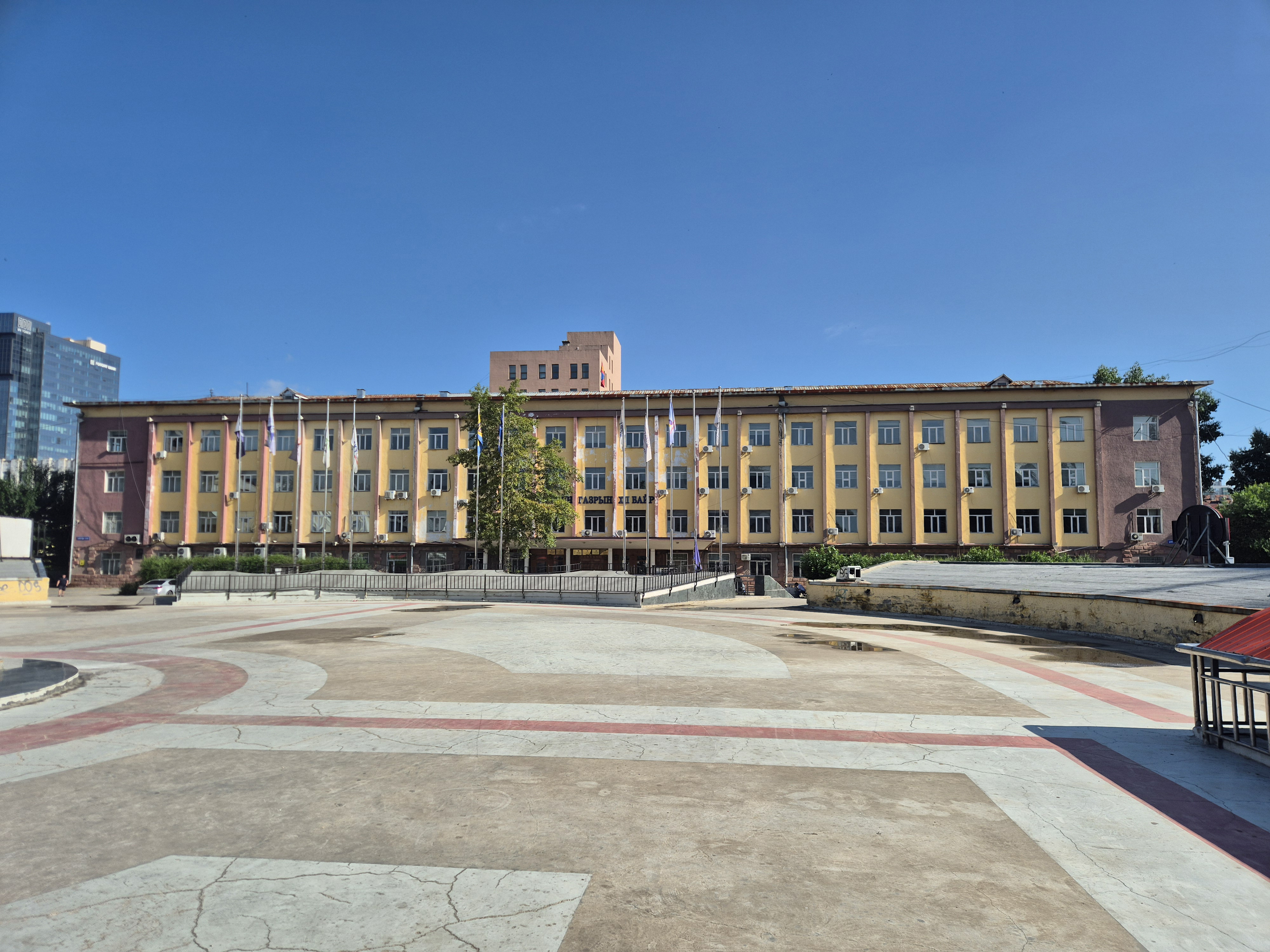
- Government Building 12 which houses the ministry

Agency overview
- Formed: 1937, as Ministry of Industry and Construction
- Preceding agency: Ministry of Road, Transport, Construction and Urban Development (2008-2012)
- Jurisdiction: Government of Mongolia
- Headquarters: Government Building XII, Barilgachdyn Sq, 4th Khoroo, Chingeltei, Ulaanbaatar 15170, Mongolia
- Employees: 93
- Minister responsible: Tserenpiliin Davaasüren
- Vice Minister responsible: Enkhtüvshingiin Zolboo
- Agency executive: Vacant, State Secretary of Ministry
- Website: mcud.gov.mn

The Ministry of Construction and Urban Development (Mongolian: Монгол Улсын Барилга, хот байгуулалтын яам) is a ministry of the Government of Mongolia. It was established in 1937. Ministry oversees urban development, housing, construction, and utility sectors in Mongolia. The ministry manages and directs operation of the State Housing Corporation and Center for Construction Development.

== Mission ==
The mission of the ministry is to create a healthy, safe, and comfortable living environment for the population by increasing the policy, planning, and effectiveness of urban development, construction, construction materials industry, housing, engineering infrastructure, and public utility sectors.

== Structure ==
The Ministry is organised into following departments and divisions:

- Department of Public Administration
  - Legal Division
  - Division of Statistics and IT
- Department of Development Policy, Planning and Urban Development
  - Division of Urban Development
- Department of Policy Implementation Coordination on Construction, Construction Materials Industry
  - Division of Construction Materials Industry
- Department of Policy Implementation Coordination on Public Utilities, Engineering Infrastructure
- Department of Finance, Investment and Cooperation
  - Division of Finance
  - Division of Foreign Cooperation
- Department of Monitoring, Evaluation and Internal Audit
- Department of Sectoral Inspection
  - Division of Engineering Infrastructure Inspection

== See also ==
- Government of Mongolia
- Administrative divisions of Mongolia
- List of cities in Mongolia
