= Mongolia–Uzbekistan relations =

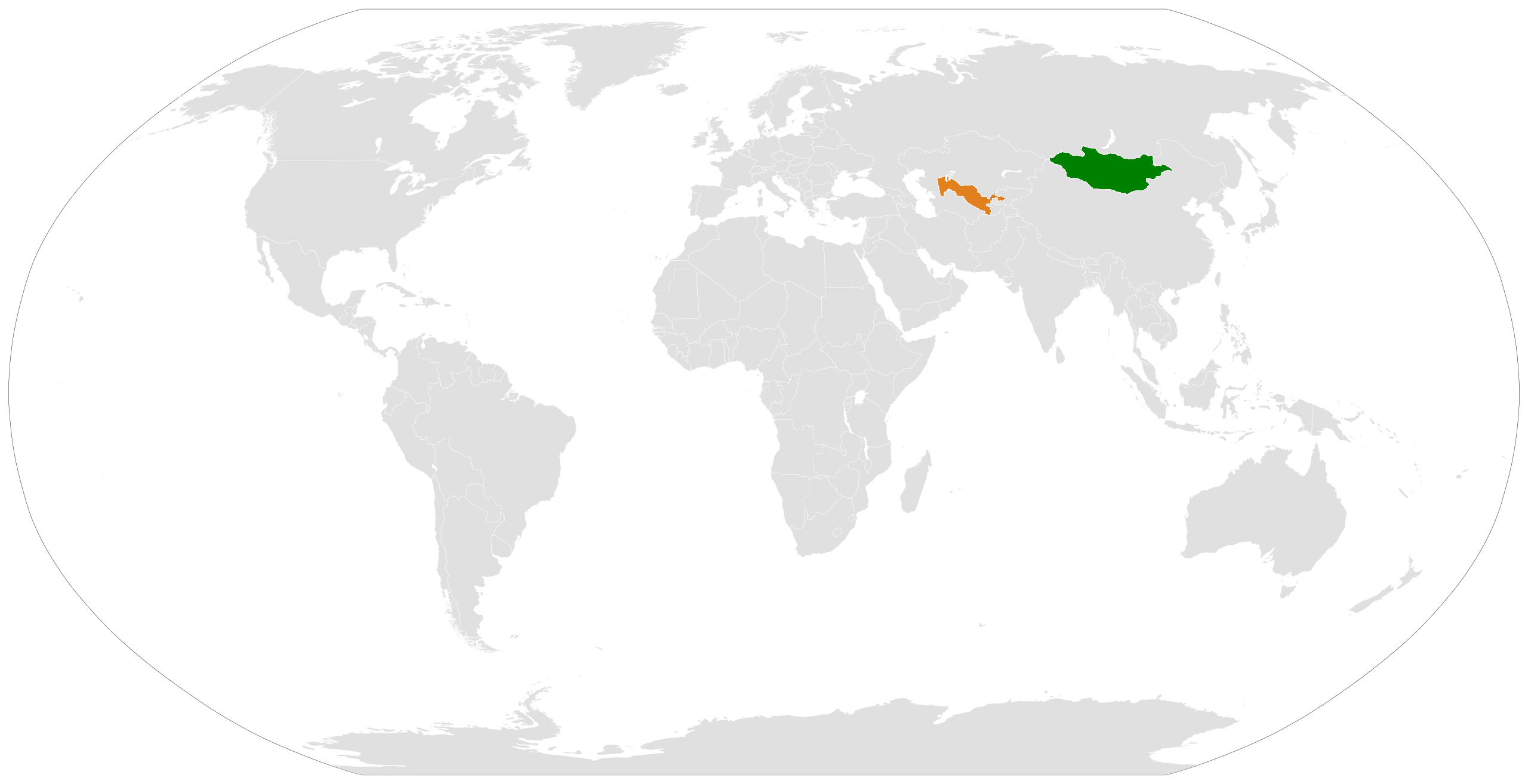

- Mongolia: Uzbekistan

Mongolia–Uzbekistan relations refer to bilateral relations between Mongolia and Uzbekistan. The two countries established diplomatic relations on 25 January 1992, after Uzbekistan gained independence from the Soviet Union. Uzbekistan does not have a representative embassy in Ulaanbaatar, while Mongolia has an embassy in Tashkent.

== History ==
Historically, both two peoples are parts of the wider Turkic and Mongolic peoples of the ancient time, sharing heritage via their ties with the Xiongnu and Yuezhi, which had caused the Han dynasty to try to take over Central Asia by attacking Fergana. The Tang dynasty later successfully took over Central Asia and modern Mongolia after a series of military campaigns to place both the lands of two countries under Chinese realm for a time being; these conquests did contribute to the dispersal of Turkic and Mongolic peoples, forging into the Karluks and the Siberian Turkic peoples, with the latter experienced stronger Mongolian influence later on. Later, the Karluks and Mongols also developed ties via the Kara-Khanid Khanate and Liao dynasty (and later the Qara Khitai) of the Khitans, a Sinicised Mongolic people, often with stiff competition but also with strong cultural exchange between the two entities.

Genghis Khan, founder of the Mongol Empire, launched a full scale invasion of the Khwarazmian Empire and decimated the entire state in process. Following the destruction of the Khwarazmian realm, the Chagatai Khanate was established by the second son of Genghis Khan, Chagatai Khan; it was during this time that the Persianate and Islamicate civilisation, already developed by the Kara-Khanids before the Mongol arrival, slowly managed to dominate the Mongol structure, creating a unique blend of both Turco-Mongol and Turco-Persian traditions that would ultimately turn the Chagatai Khanate into a combination of Turco-Persian-Mongol culture.

One of this very product of the Turco-Mongol-Persian tradition and combination was Timur, the Persianised Turco-Mongol conqueror and founder of the Timurid Empire, who ushered into a golden era of Turco-Mongol domination and cultural development, in which the Chagatai language, a Turkic language of the Karluks (and distinct from that of the Oghuz Ottoman Turkish) was spread throughout the empire. It is the only Turkic language named after a Mongol Khan. A descendant of Timur, Babur, would carry this to India under the form of the Mughal Empire, where the Turco-Mongol-Persian traditions fused with Indian culture and tradition to create a unique heritage of India, where a Muslim empire had been so influenced by Indian civilisation to become distinct on their own.

Outside the Timurid dynasty, a sub-branch of the Chagatai Khanate called Moghulistan controlled Xinjiang's Tarim Basin region, during which they Islamised the whole population to become Karluk-speaking people that is now known today as Uyghurs. Meanwhile, in 1507, the Shaybanids Uzbeks, originally Turco-Mongol Kipchaks, expelled the Timurids from Central Asia and established the Khanate of Bukhara, only to enter a reversed Karlukisation process and lost their Kipchak heritage to become heirs and protectors of the Timurid civilisation, and reconciled with the Mughal rulers of India; by the time the Janid dynasty replaced the Shaybanids, they were also Karlukised as well and their Uzbek identity moved away from a Kipchak tribal confederation into the modern Karluk form, continuing the Turco-Mongol-Persian traditions.

Both two nations were later dominated by the Russian Empire and Soviet Union, with Russian Turkestan and later Soviet Turkestan the heartland of Soviet governance in the region; while Mongolia was made a Soviet satellite state. Nonetheless, the Tsarist and Soviet rules had been more relaxed on both groups due to the need of the Tsarist and Soviet rulers to accommodate the reality of Uzbek domination in Central Asia, and Mongolia being a buffer against China, although there had been rebellions against Russian and Soviet rules like the Basmachi movement in 1916.

== Today ==
After the fall of the Soviet Union, Mongolia and Uzbekistan established relations in 1992.

Since the liberalisation of Uzbek economy under Shavkat Mirziyoyev in 2017, trades between the two nations have boomed dramatically. Between 2019 and 2024, Uzbekistan and Mongolia had rapidly expanded economic ties, with bilateral trade surging over 10.5-fold to $20.4 million; key cooperation focuses on agriculture, mining, and logistics, bolstered by 17 joint ventures (12 with 100% Mongolian capital) and newly established direct air service to boost trade. Both nations have been supportive of each other due to this shared heritage since ancient times, and, especially, the Chagatai links.

In 2025, Mongolia and Uzbekistan established “comprehensive partnership relations," boosting their relationship.

== Resident diplomatic missions ==
- Mongolia has an embassy in Tashkent.
- Uzbekistan is accredited to Mongolia from its embassy in Beijing, China.

== See also ==
- Foreign relations of Mongolia
- Foreign relations of Uzbekistan
