= Dangaasürengiin Enkhbat =

Mongolian internet entrepreneur and politician (born 1959)

- Дангаасүрэнгийн Энхбат
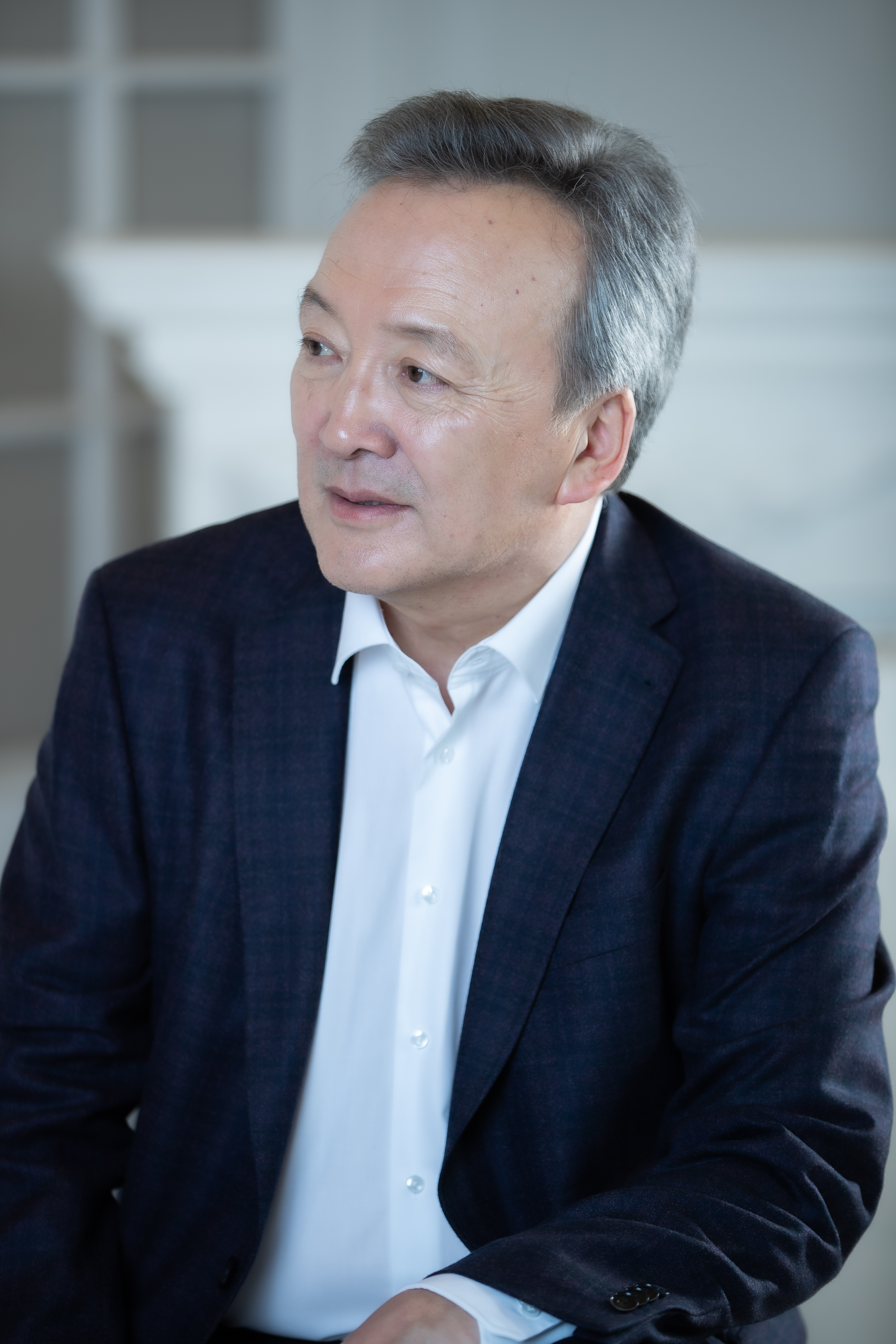
- Enkhbat in 2021

Member of the State Great Khural
- In office July 2008 – 6 July 2012
- Constituency: 25th, Bayangol District (2008–2012)

Chairman of the Civil Will–Green Party
- In office 12 March 2012 – 9 March 2015 Serving with Sanjaasürengiin Oyun and Sambuugiin Dembrel
- Preceded by: Post established
- Succeeded by: Tserendorjiin Gankhuyag

Chairman of the Mongolian Green Party
- In office 3 November 2007 – 3 November 2012 (Note: De facto ended on 12 March 2012, when Enkhbat founded the Civil Will–Green Party)
- Preceded by: Davaagiin Basandorj
- Succeeded by: Olzodyn Boum-Yalagch

Personal details
- Born: 19 January 1959 (age 67) Ulaanbaatar, Mongolia
- Party: Independent (since 2015)
- Other political affiliations: Civil Will–Green Party (2012–2015); Mongolian Green Party (2007–2012)
- Spouse: D.Oyuntsetseg
- Children: 2 sons, 1 daughter
- Education: Ural Polytechnic Institute; Moscow Institute of Steel and Alloys
- Occupation: Systems engineer
- Known for: Founder of Datacom LLC, which launched the internet in Mongolia

Dangaasürengiin Enkhbat (Mongolian: Дангаасүрэнгийн Энхбат; born on 19 January 1959) is a Mongolian politician, systems engineer, and internet entrepreneur best known for introducing the internet to Mongolia in 1996. Prior to the 1990s, he worked for the statistics and planning authorities during Mongolia's socialist era. Throughout his career, he has worked on strategic planning, mathematical modeling, human-machine systems, software systems, internet and space communications, and systems research in pursuit of progress and development.

Enkhbat has also been engaged in politics since 2006. As chairperson of the Mongolian Green Party from 2007 to 2012, he was elected to the State Great Khural in 2008, serving a full four-year term, and founded the Civil Will–Green Party with the Civil Will Party in 2010, which provoked a split within his own party. Enkhbat later ran in the 2021 presidential election as an independent candidate of the Right Person Electorate Coalition, coming in second with around 20% of the ballot.

== Early life and education ==
Enkhbat was born in Ulaanbaatar, the capital of the Mongolian People's Republic, on 19 January 1959. He was born to a family of eight. In 1975, he completed his 10-year secondary education at the 23rd secondary school in Ulaanbaatar. After studying for five years, he graduated from the Ural Polytechnic Institute in Sverdlovsk, Soviet Union, as a systems engineer in 1980.

Upon graduation, he worked as an operator from 1980 to 1981 and later as a programmer from 1981 to 1984 at the Computing Center of the National Statistical Authority. Enkhbat enrolled at the Moscow Institute of Steel and Alloys in 1984 and graduated with a doctoral degree in technical sciences in 1988.

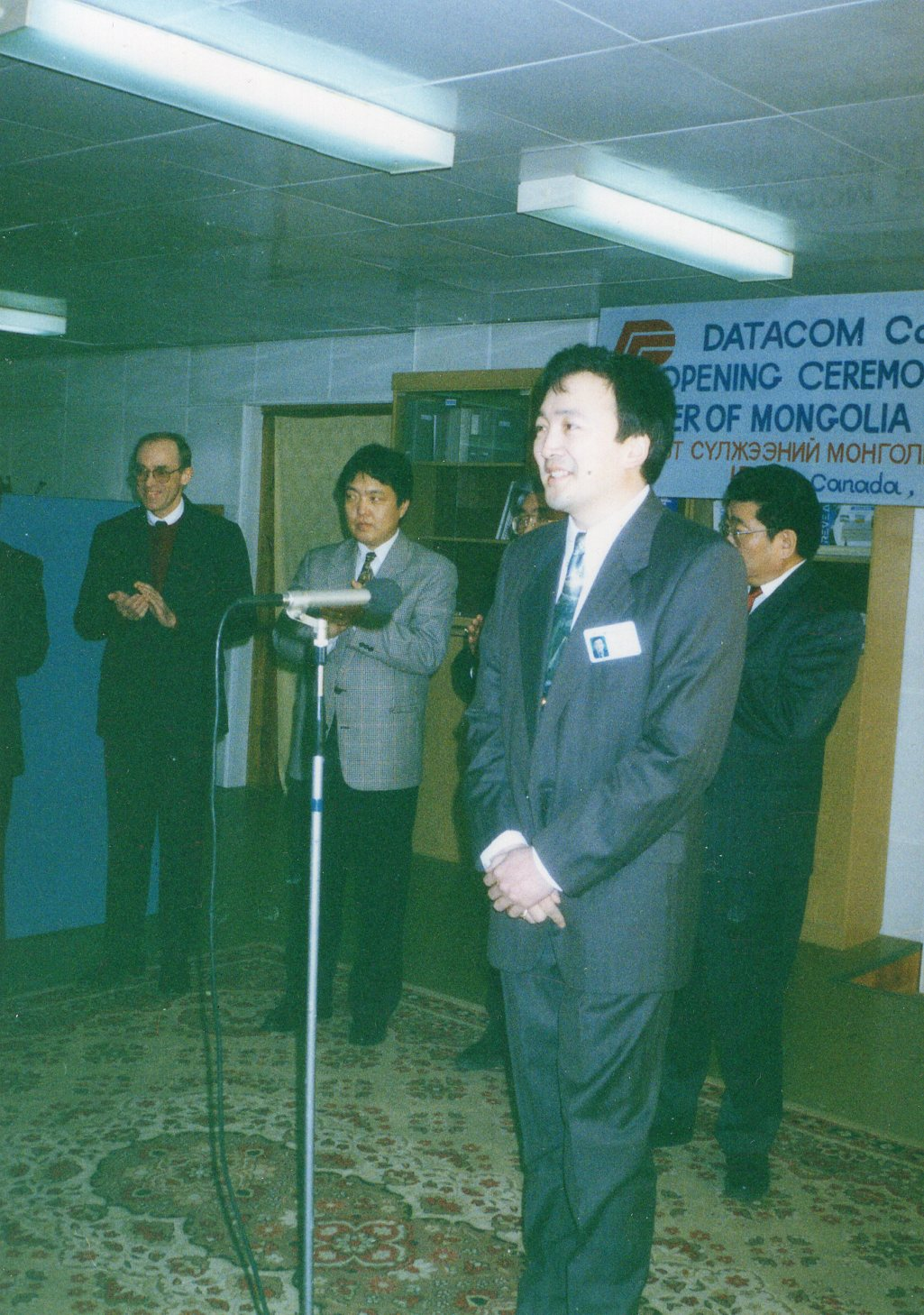
Enkhbat during the opening ceremony of Mongolia's first Internet node, 17 January 1996

== Career ==
- 1988-1990 Researcher at the National Training and Research Institute
- 1990.04-1990.10 Deputy chairman of the State Committee for Technical Progress and Standardization, director of the International Laboratory of Technological Microprocesses, Mongolian People's Republic
- 1990-1992 Deputy minister at the Ministry of National Development
- 1992-1993 Director general at "Mongolian Communications" LLC
- 1994-2008 Director general and founder of Datacom LLC
- 2008-2012 Member of Parliament
- 2017 Executive director, and founder of Business 2.0 academy
- 2018 Executive director, and founder of Karakorum Digital Academia, Business Media LLC

=== Public works ===
- 1996-2001 Member of the board of the Mongolian "Open Society" forum
- 2001-2004 Chairman of the board of the Mongolian Information Development Association (MIDAS)
- 2004-2006 Program director and presenter of "Forum"
- 2012-2018 Founder and chairman of the "Open Knowledge Foundation"

== Political career ==
- 2007-2008 President of Mongolian Civil Organizations Association
- 2007-2012 Leader of the Мongolian Green Party
- 2012-2015 Leader of the Civil Will–Green Party
- 2008-2012 Member of Parliament
- 2021 Presidential candidate for the 2021 presidential election from the Right Person Electorate Coalition

== Personal life ==
Enkhbat married D. Oyuntsetseg in 1982, who is a forest engineer and economist. Oyuntsetseg worked for the State Planning Commission during the socialist period, and later ran her own business in the tourism industry after Mongolia's transition to free market economy and democracy. They have two sons and a daughter. As of 2021, they have four grandchildren

He is fluent in Russian and English in addition to his mother tongue, Mongolian.
