= Mongolian diaspora =

Mongolians who live abroad

Гадаад дахь монголчууд
- Flag of Mongolia

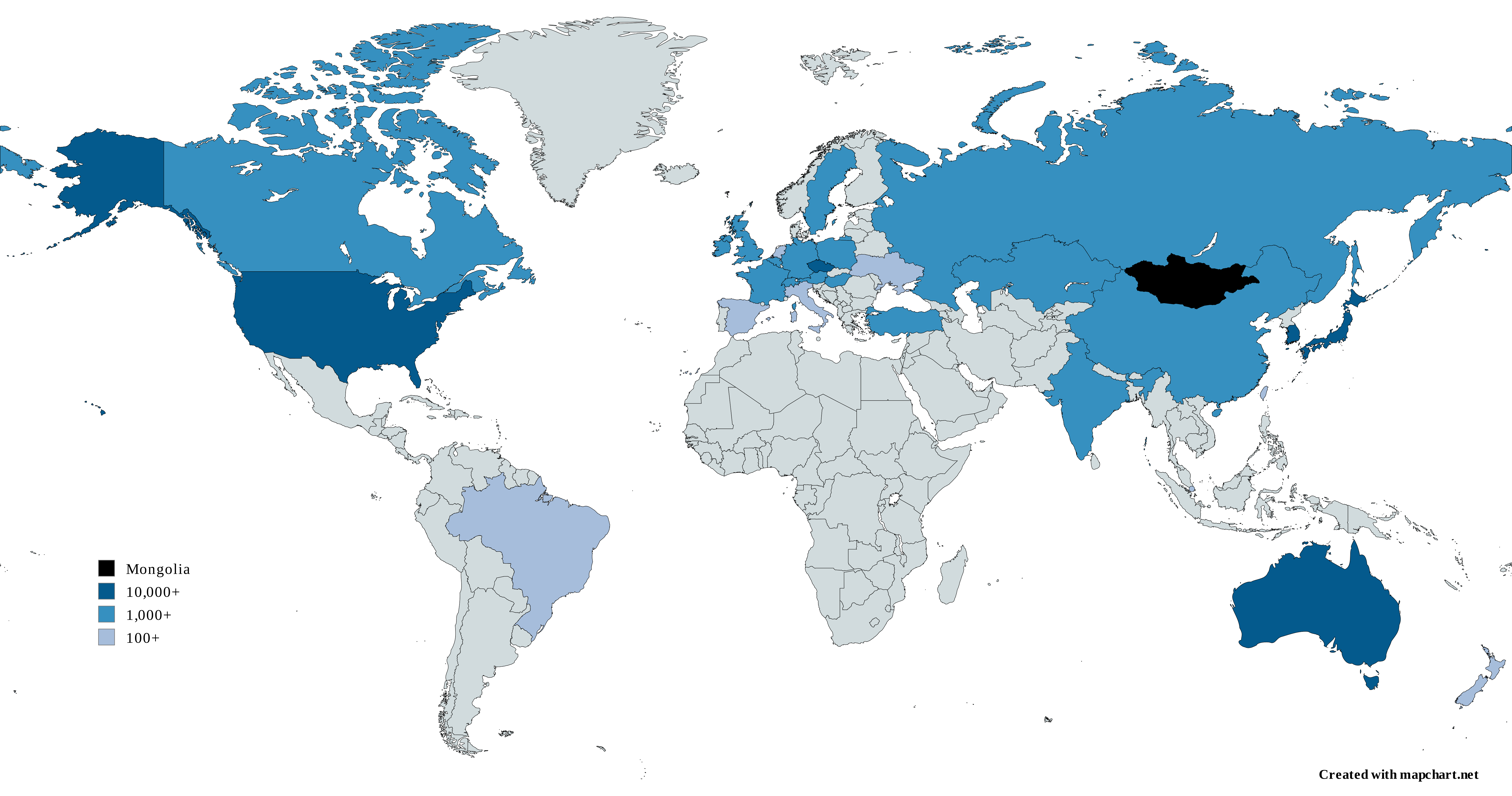
- Map of the Mongolian diaspora in 2024

Total population
- 211,611 (2023 Census)

Regions with significant populations
- South Korea: 54,549 (Jan. 2024)
- United States: 43,430 (2023)
- Japan: 21,359 (Dec. 2025)
- Czech Republic: 15,355 (Sep. 2026)
- Sweden: 12,800 (2023)
- Australia: 15,290 (June.2024)
- Germany: 7,265 (2023)
- Kazakhstan: 7,218 (2020)
- France: 7,000 (2023)
- China (excluding ethnic Mongols living in Inner Mongolia): 6,428 (2023)
- Ireland: 5,340 (2024)
- Russia (excluding Kalmyks, Buryats, and Tuvans): 5,071 (2023)
- United Kingdom: 3,701 (2010)
- India: 1,116 (2010)
- Taiwan: 684 (2021)
- Ukraine: 200 (2024)
- Brazil: 102 (2025)

Languages
- Mongolian

Related ethnic groups
- Mongols

The Mongolian diaspora refers to people from the modern country of Mongolia who live outside Mongolia. According to the Mongolian census of 2020, 122,550 Mongolian nationals were reported to be living abroad for more than six months, an increase of 14% from the previous census conducted in 2010. In a recent 2023 report by the Ministry of Foreign Affairs, 211,611 Mongolian nationals were reported to be residing overseas.

The largest Mongolian populations were recorded in South Korea, the United States, Japan, the Czech Republic, Sweden, and Australia, all with over 10,000 Mongolians. 6.1% of Mongolia's total population resides abroad.

== Demographics ==
According to the 2020 census, the diaspora was reported to mostly be of working age, skewing female, with the population of children (0-14) almost doubling from 2010 to 2020, indicating more long-term settlement abroad. 74.5% of the diaspora population originated from Ulaanbaatar, with the next most common provinces of origin being Bayan-Ölgii, Darkhan-Uul, and Orkhon.

Mongolians residing in Europe were reported to have the highest average duration of settlement (11+ years), while those in Russia, China, South Korea, and Japan were mostly short-term residents (less than 1 year).

In the European Union, the Czech Republic has the largest Mongolian diaspora, out of which the vast majority reside in the North Bohemian city of Česká Lípa. The community there has grown significantly in the last five years, and of the approximately 400 "foreign" students in the local elementary schools, 300 are of Mongolian descent. The city had to take extraordinary measures by hiring native Mongolian speakers at local schools to educate the local Mongolian diaspora youth.

The majority (46.7%) of Mongolians abroad initially went as students, and 44% of the diaspora population had tertiary degrees.
