= 2024 in Mongolia =

- Decades: 2000s; 2010s; 2020s
- See also: Other events of 2024; Timeline of Mongolian history

Events in the year 2024 in Mongolia.

== Incumbents ==
- President: Ukhnaagiin Khürelsükh
- Prime Minister: Luvsannamsrain Oyun-Erdene

== Events ==
=== January ===
- 23 January – Six people are killed and 14 are injured after a gas truck collides with a car in Ulaanbaatar.

=== April ===
- 27-28 April – The Business Revival Western Region Forum is held in Ulaangom, aimed at boosting growth and cross-border trade in West Mongolia.

=== May ===
- 16-18 May –The Innovation, Renewable Energy and Energy Efficiency International Expo and Conference (IREEE) is held in Ulaanbaatar.

=== June ===
- 24 June – The commissioning of Berkh Thermal Power Plant in Batnorov, Khentii Province.
- 28 June – 2024 Mongolian parliamentary election: Voting is held to elect members of the State Great Khural in the first election since the chamber was expanded to 126 seats and the first to use parallel voting. The ruling Mongolian People's Party (MPP) loses its supermajority but stays in power with a narrow majority.

=== July ===
- 3 July – The exhibition "Chinggis Khaan: How the Mongols Changed the World" is displayed at the Chinggis Khaan National Museum, featuring the 719-year-old letter from Ulziit Khaan to King Phillip IV.
- 4–7 July – 23rd Playtime Festival in Nalaikh, Ulaanbaatar.

=== August ===
- 22 August – Ulaanbaatar hosts the World Women’s Forum “Towards a Greener Future”, with over 800 women leaders and 19 heads of state attending.

=== September ===
- 2 September – Russian president Vladimir Putin arrives in Mongolia to discuss a China–Russia gas pipeline meant to recoup Russian losses from Western sanctions, despite Ukraine's urges for Mongolia to arrest Putin under his International Criminal Court warrant.
- 15 September –
  - Germany wins the FIBA 3x3 U23 World Cup in Ulaanbaatar after defeating the United States in the final. Lithuania takes bronze, and Fabian Giessmann wins MVP and top scorer.
  - The United States wins the FIBA 3x3 U23 Women’s World Cup in Ulaanbaatar after defeating the Netherlands 21–15; Sania Feagin wins MVP and top scorer.

=== October ===
- 11 October – Local governing council elections are held across Mongolia, with the ruling MPP winning a landslide victory.

=== November ===
- 2 November – President Ukhnaagiin Khürelsükh awards the Order of Chinggis Khaan, Mongolia’s highest state decoration, to former United Nations Secretary-General Ban Ki-moon.
- 19 November – Trafigura reportedly begins seeking $500 million missing in Mongolia after a year-long probe into misconduct at its fuel business involving main counterparty Lex Oil.

=== December ===
- 5 December – Mongolia's “Mongol nomad traditions and its associated practices” are inscribed on the Intangible cultural heritage list by UNESCO.
- 6 December – The commissioning of Baganuur 50 MW Battery Storage Power Station in Baganuur, Ulaanbaatar.
- 9 December – The MongolZ esports team reaches 7th place in HLTV’s global CS2 rankings, becoming the highest-ranked Asian team.

== Holidays ==
- 1 January - New Year's Day
- 10-12 February - Mongolian Lunar New Year
- 8 March - International Women's Day
- 23 May - Buddha's Birthday
- 1 June - Children's Day
- 11–15 July - Naadam
- 2 November - Genghis Khan Birthday
- 26 November - Republic Day
- 29 December - Independence Day

== Art and entertainment ==
- List of Mongolian submissions for the Academy Award for Best International Feature Film

== Deaths ==
- Noroviin Baatar, ballet dancer and actor
