= 2027 in Mongolia =

- Decades: 2000s; 2010s; 2020s
- See also: Other events of 2027; Timeline of Mongolian history

Events in the year 2027 in Mongolia.

== Events ==
=== Predicted and scheduled ===
- June – 2027 Mongolian presidential election

== Holidays ==
- 1 January – New Year's Day
- 7–9 March – Mongolian Lunar New Year
- 8 March – International Women's Day
- 20 May – Buddha's Birthday
- 1 June – Children's Day
- 11–15 July – Naadam
- 26 November – Republic Day
- 29 November – Genghis Khan Birthday
- 29 December – Independence Day
