= 1993 in Mongolia =

- Decades: 1970s; 1980s; 1990s; 2000s; 2010s
- See also: Other events of 1993; Timeline of Mongolian history

Events in the year 1993 in Mongolia.

== Incumbents ==
- President: Punsalmaagiin Ochirbat
- Prime Minister: Puntsagiin Jasrai

== Events ==
- 6 June – 1993 Mongolian presidential election.
- 5 December – The establishment of Mongolian Traditional United Party.
