= UBX =

UBX may refer to:

- Ulaanbaatar Securities Exchange, a stock exchange in Mongolia
- Ultrabithorax, a homeobox gene found in insects
