= New Recovery Policy (Mongolia) =

Mongolian economic policy launched in 2021

Development program overview
- Formed: 31 December 2021
- Jurisdiction: Government of Mongolia
- Minister responsible: Luvsannamsrain Oyun-Erdene, Prime Minister of Mongolia
- Website: www.nrpa.gov.mn/en

New Recovery Policy is a mid-term economic policy launched by the government of Mongolia aimed at revitalising the country’s economy following the outbreak of the global COVID-19 pandemic, as part of the country's Vision 2050. Introduced by Prime Minister L. Oyun-Erdene, the policy seeks to enhance Mongolia's economic independence, mitigate the adverse economic effects of the COVID-19 pandemic, and tackle development challenges over a 10 year period.

== Overview ==
=== Strategic Pillars ===
The New Recovery Policy focuses on six interrelated areas to promote Mongolia’s economic resilience and growth:

1. Energy Recovery
2. Border Ports Recovery
3. Industrial Recovery
4. Urban and Rural Recovery
5. Green Development Recovery
6. Recovery Public Sector Efficiency

=== Funding and international collaboration ===
The New Recovery Policy is supported by a financial framework combining domestic resources and foreign investment. In 2022, the government secured commitments amounting to MNT 150 trillion for infrastructure and development projects. International organizations, including the United Nations, World Bank, European Bank for Reconstruction and Development and Asian Development Bank, have participated in consultations and provided technical assistance.

== See also ==
- Government of Mongolia
- Economy of Mongolia
