= 2025 in Mongolia =

- Decades: 2000s; 2010s; 2020s
- See also: Other events of 2025; Timeline of Mongolian history

Events in the year 2025 in Mongolia.

== Incumbents ==
- President: Ukhnaagiin Khürelsükh
- Prime Minister: Luvsannamsrain Oyun-Erdene (until 13 June); Gombojavyn Zandanshatar (since 13 June)

== Events ==
=== January ===
- 2 January – Mongolia adopts dual Cyrillic and vertical Mongolian scripts for governmental documents.

=== March ===
- 3 March – China blocks beef imports from Mongolia.
- 17 March – Eight employees of Noorog Creative Studio are detained by the Cyber Crime Department.
- 25 March – The largest fully preserved dinosaur claw is unearthed in the Gobi Desert.

=== April ===
- 8 April – A previously unknown species of ancient mammal from the Cretaceous period 90 million years ago is recorded for the first time in Mongolia, at a site in the Bayanshiree Formation in Dornogovi Province.
- 12 April – Severe dust storms in Govi-Altai Province displace at least 130 families and damage 17 apartment buildings.

=== May ===
- 13 May – Protests begin against Prime Minister Luvsannamsrain Oyun-Erdene over reports of "lavish spending" by his son.
- 28 May – Prime Minister Luvsannamsrain Oyun-Erdene calls for a vote of confidence amid protests over allegations of corruption tied to his family.

=== June ===
- 3 June – Prime Minister Luvsannamsrain Oyun-Erdene resigns after losing a no-confidence vote in the State Great Khural.
- 12 June – Former Khural speaker Gombojavyn Zandanshatar is selected as prime minister by the State Great Khural.
- 19 June – Rio Tinto agrees to a $139M settlement over allegations it misled investors about delays and cost overruns at the Oyu Tolgoi mine.

=== August ===
- 28 August – A South Korean national dies in a fall at the summit of the Uran Togoo volcano in Bulgan Province.

=== September ===
- 27 September – The Khomyn Tal National Park is designated as a biosphere reserve by UNESCO.

=== October ===
- 17 October – Gombojavyn Zandanshatar is removed as prime minister by the State Great Khural amid a feud within the Mongolian People's Party between him and Khural chair Dashzegviin Amarbayasgalan, who also resigns as speaker.
- 20 October – President Ukhnaagiin Khürelsükh vetoes the dismissal of Gombojavyn Zandanshatar as prime minister by the State Great Khural, citing procedural errors.

== Holidays ==
- 1 January – New Year's Day
- 1–3 March – Mongolian Lunar New Year
- 8 March – International Women's Day
- 1 June – Children's Day
- 4 June – Buddha's Birthday
- 11–15 July – Naadam
- 21 November – Genghis Khan Birthday
- 26 November – Republic Day
- 29 December – Independence Day

== Art and entertainment ==
- List of Mongolian submissions for the Academy Award for Best International Feature Film

== Deaths ==
- 3 January – Dashbaldangiin Purevsuren, 95, opera singer.
- 17 January – Punsalmaagiin Ochirbat, 82, president (1990–1997), MP (1976–1997), and judge of the Constitutional Court (since 2005).
