= 2026 in Mongolia =

- Decades: 2000s; 2010s; 2020s
- See also: Other events of 2026; Timeline of Mongolian history

Events in the year 2026 in Mongolia.

== Incumbents ==
- President: Ukhnaagiin Khürelsükh
- Prime Minister: Gombojavyn Zandanshatar (until March 31); Nyam-Osoryn Uchral (starting March 31)

== Events ==
- 27 March – The State Great Khural accepts the resignation of Prime Minister Gombojavyn Zandanshatar.
- 17 June – Protesters demanding a greater domestic share of mining revenues carry out a roadside blockade of copper exports from the Oyu Tolgoi mine operated by Rio Tinto.
- 19 July – An assailant, purportedly armed with an axe and yelling antisemitic remarks, attacks a group of Israeli tourists in northern part of the country.
- 7 October – One person is killed in a bear attack inside a ger in Bayanzürkh, Ulaanbaatar.
- 8 October – A wildfire burns 80% of the Numrug National Park.

== Holidays ==
- 1 January – New Year's Day
- 1–3 March – Mongolian Lunar New Year
- 8 March – International Women's Day
- 1 June – Children's Day
- 4 June – Buddha's Birthday
- 11–15 July – Naadam
- 21 November – Genghis Khan Birthday
- 26 November – Republic Day
- 29 December – Independence Day
