= Vision 2050 =

Vision 2050 may refer to:

- Vision 2050 (Mongolia)
- Vision 2050 (Rwanda)
- Munich S-Bahn#S-Bahn Vision 2050
