= Chinggis Khaan Sovereign Wealth Fund =

Sovereign wealth fund of Mongolia

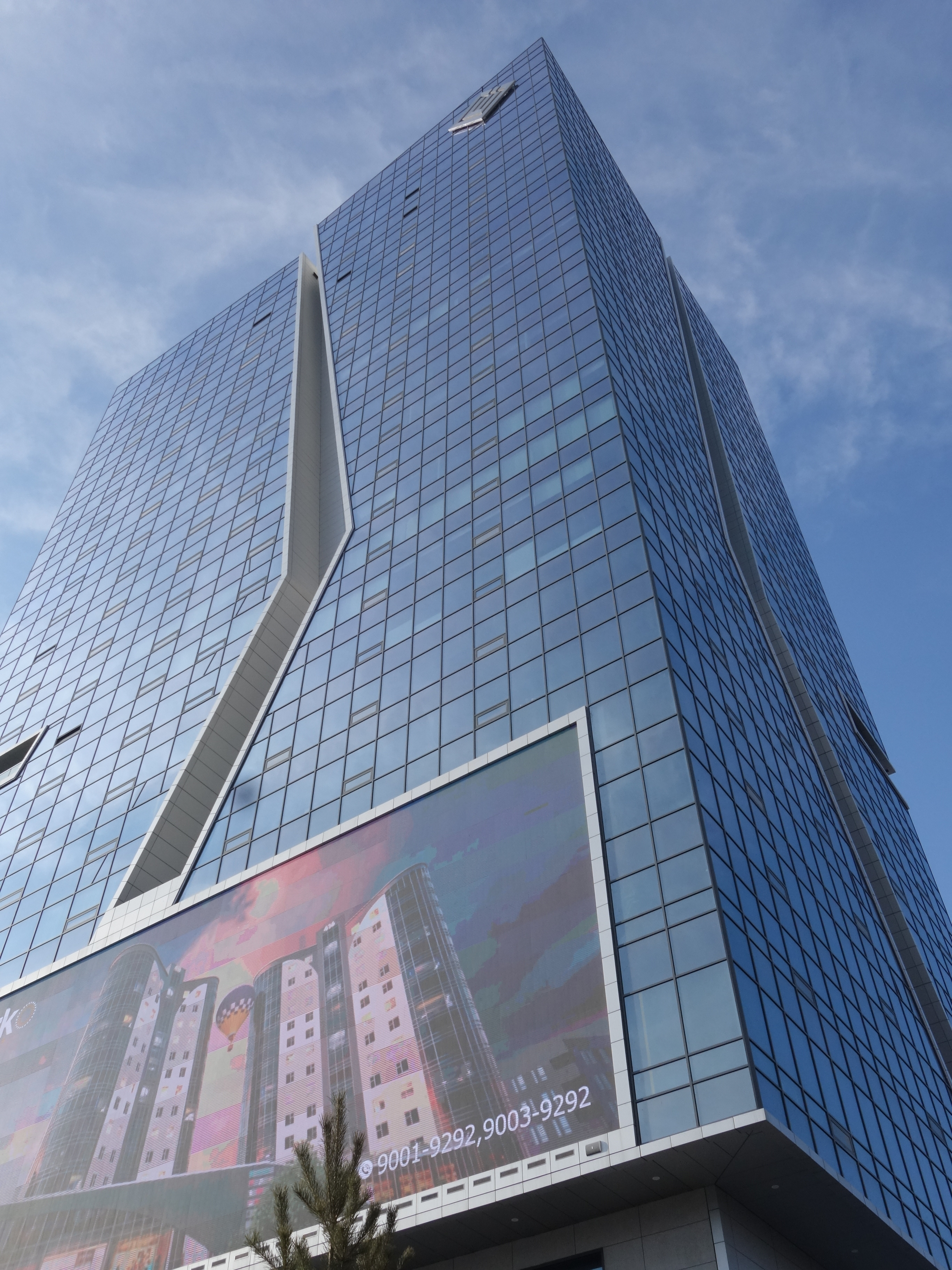
Eco International Tower which houses the headquarters of Chinggis Fund

The Chinggis Khaan Sovereign Wealth Fund (Chinggis Fund; Mongolian: Чингис Хаан Үндэсний Баялгийн Сан) is a sovereign wealth fund established by the Government of Mongolia in May 2024. It was created to manage and invest the country's resource revenues, with the goal of supporting long-term economic development, inter-generational equity, social welfare and creating opportunities for collaboration with international investment partners. The fund is administered under legislation passed by the Parliament of Mongolia and is integrated with Mongolia's national digital services platform, E-Mongolia.

The proposal to create a sovereign wealth fund in Mongolia was first introduced in 2021. The initiative aimed to provide a stable mechanism for investing the country's mineral and resource revenues, along with ongoing efforts to diversify the national economy and promote fiscal sustainability.

== Establishment ==
In April 2024, the Mongolian Parliament enacted legislation to formally establish a national sovereign wealth fund. The fund was designed with a three-tiered structure to balance long-term savings with short-term developmental needs, and officially launched by Prime Minister Oyun-Erdene in May 2024. In December 2024, the fund was renamed the Chinggis Fund in honour of Chinggis Khan, the founding figure of the Mongol Empire and a central symbol in Mongolian national identity.

== Structure ==
The Chinggis Fund comprises three distinct accounts:

- Future Heritage Fund: Designed for long-term savings and investment for future generations.
- Development Fund: Allocated to support national development projects and strategic economic initiatives.
- Savings Fund: Set aside for direct citizen benefit and accessible through the E-Mongolia digital governance platform.

Each account is governed under separate financial and policy rules, aiming to ensure fiscal discipline, transparency, and strategic allocation.

== Financial overview ==
As of late 2024, the Future Heritage Fund had accrued approximately MNT4 trillion. In addition, MNT 495 billion had been deposited into the Savings Fund, amounting to an average of MNT 135,000 per citizen. These funds are accessible through verified national ID and digital authentication systems linked to E-Mongolia.

== See also ==
- Government of Mongolia
- Economy of Mongolia
- E-Mongolia
