= Urtnasan =

Urtnasan is a Mongolian name.

People with the name include:

- Nyamjav Urtnasan (born 1975), Mongolian politician
- Urtnasan Nasanjargal (born 1994), Mongolian chess grandmaster
