= 2019 in Mongolia =

- Decades: 1990s; 2000s; 2010s; 2020s
- See also: Other events of 2019; Timeline of Mongolian history

Events in the year 2019 in Mongolia.

== Incumbents ==
- President: Khaltmaagiin Battulga
- Prime Minister: Ukhnaagiin Khürelsükh

== Events ==
- 16 June – Foreign Minister of Japan Tarō Kōno seeks cooperation from Mongolia over efforts to settle the issue of past abductions of Japanese nationals by North Korea, as Mongolia maintains friendly ties with Pyongyang. Japan has no ties with North Korea and pushes for further sanctions.
- 2–7 September – 2019 Asian Junior and Cadet Table Tennis Championships in Ulaanbaatar.
- 18 October – The commissioning of Mandalgovi–Ulaanbaatar Transmission Line.
- 23 October – The opening of Word Financial History Museum in Ulaanbaatar.
- 31 October – Mongolian police arrest 800 Chinese citizens and confiscate hundreds of computers and SIM cards in Ulaanbaatar. Authorities believe they were part of a cybercrime ring involved in illegal gambling, hacking and identity theft, among other activities.

== Deaths ==
- 2 April – Choidoryn Övgönkhüü, 76, Olympic judoka (1972).
- 29 April – Jamsrangiin Ölzii-Orshikh, 52, Olympic racing cyclist (1992).
- 13 June – Nature Ganganbaigal, 29, Chinese-Mongolian folk-rock musician (Tengger Cavalry) and composer.
- 15 July – Byambasuren Sharav, 66, composer and pianist.
