= Growl of Clown =

Mongolian deathcore band

Growl of Clown G.O.C
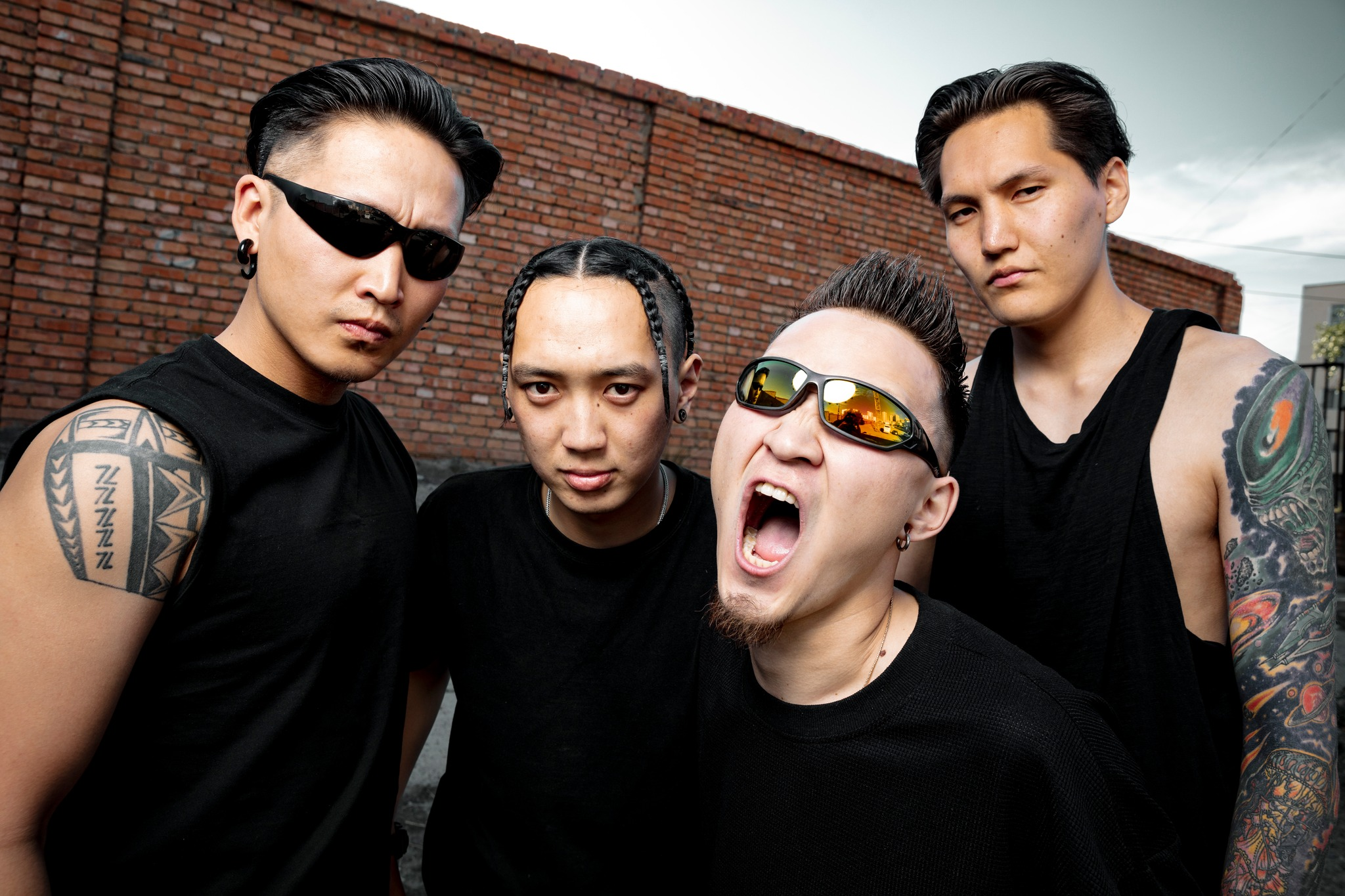
- Current members of G.O.C

Background information
- Origin: Ulaanbaatar, Mongolia
- Genres: Deathcore, djent
- Years active: 2014–present
- Members: Khurelbaatar Battulga; Altan-Erdene Erdenechimeg; Barkhuu Otgonbayar; Yeruult Yostoi
- Past members: Khuder; Munkhhuyag; Tuyakhuu; Tuvshinbayar; Tuvshin; Ariun-Erdene Ganbaatar; Jambaljav Nyamjav
- Website: https://growlofclown.com

Growl of Clown (often abbreviated as G.O.C) is a Mongolian deathcore band formed in 2014. They formed a band and prepared their first songs and music in a Mongolian Yurt at a traditional cattle farm. The band currently consists of four members: vocalist Khurelbaatar Battulga, drummer Altan-Erdene Erdenechimeg, lead guitarist Barkhuu Otgonbayar, and bass guitarist Yeruult Yostoi.

== History ==
The band's first stage performance was at the “Noise Metal” Music Festival in Mongolia. Only three people saw them perform at the time (the people who caught them perform were girlfriend and two friends). In Mongolia, only a small percentage of all music listeners are interested in metal music. However, they kept trying and released their first 8-song EP album, “The Fallen City”, in 2018. In terms of bands and content, they aim to criticize the so-called gray issues of society and express their opposition to violence in their works. The first album carries deep themes, and its cover features a screaming skull emerging from ruins.".

Munkh-Orgil Turbold was the producer of the recording of the first album “The Fallen City” and it was recorded in The Library Records. Barkhuu Otgonbayar, the band's lead guitarist, played a key role in the composition of the album. Khurelbaatar Battulga, the band's vocalist, primarily writes the lyrics and incorporates some verses with permission from Mongolian poets Ganbold Batbayar and Galsansukh Baatar.

Furthermore, Growl of Clown became a well-known metal music band in Mongolia and created a deathcore fanbase. In 2015, on the band's first anniversary, they organized an event called "Wake Up" and invited more than 100 people, including the metalcore band Break the Cycle. Furthermore, “Wake Up” has expanded to include festivals, regardless of live music, and has become an annual winter event. Their goal was to expand the festival to include live music, bring the world's biggest bands to Mongolia, and grow of live music audience.

Other highlights of the group were its participation in music festivals in Mongolia and abroad. The band has participated in the Playtime live music festival, which is held in Mongolia every summer. They also participated in the Metal Hail Festival in Irkutsk, Russia in 2018, the Nine Treasures Concert in Hohhot, China, and the Zandari Festa Music Festival in South Korea in 2019.

== Band members ==
Current

- Khurelbaatar Battulga – Vocals (2014 –present)
- Altan-Erdene Erdenechimeg – Drums (2014 –present)
- Barkhuu Otgonbayar – Lead guitar (2017 –present)
- Yeruult Yostoi – Bass (2022 –present)

Former

- Tuyakhuu – Guitar (2014–2015)
- Khuder – Guitar (2014–2017)
- Munkhhuyag – Bass (2014–2017)
- Tuvshinbayar – Guitar (2015–2017)
- Ariun-Erdene Ganbaatar – Bass (2018–2022)
- Jambaljav Nyamjav – Guitar (2018 –present)
- Tuvshin – Guitar (2017–2018)

== Discography ==
=== Extended plays ===
Title	EP details
The Fallen City	Released: August 5, 2018; Label: Independent; Format: CD, Digital
