= 2020 in Mongolia =

- Decades: 2000s; 2010s; 2020s
- See also: Other events of 2020; Timeline of Mongolian history

Events in the year 2020 in Mongolia.

== Incumbents ==
- President: Khaltmaagiin Battulga
- Prime Minister: Ukhnaagiin Khürelsükh

== Events ==
- 27 January – Due to COVID-19, the Mongolian government announced they would close the border with China. They also began closing schools on the same day.
- 10 March – Deputy Prime Minister Ölziisaikhany Enkhtüvshin announced that a French national arriving in Ulaanbaatar via a flight from Moscow was the first confirmed COVID-19 case in the country.
- 21 March – Establishment of the Right Person Electorate Coalition
- 2 October – The launch of E-Mongolia.

== Deaths ==
- Molom Tsend, 88, mongolian politician
