= Playtime Festival =

Music festival in Ulaanbaatar, Mongolia

Playtime Music Festival
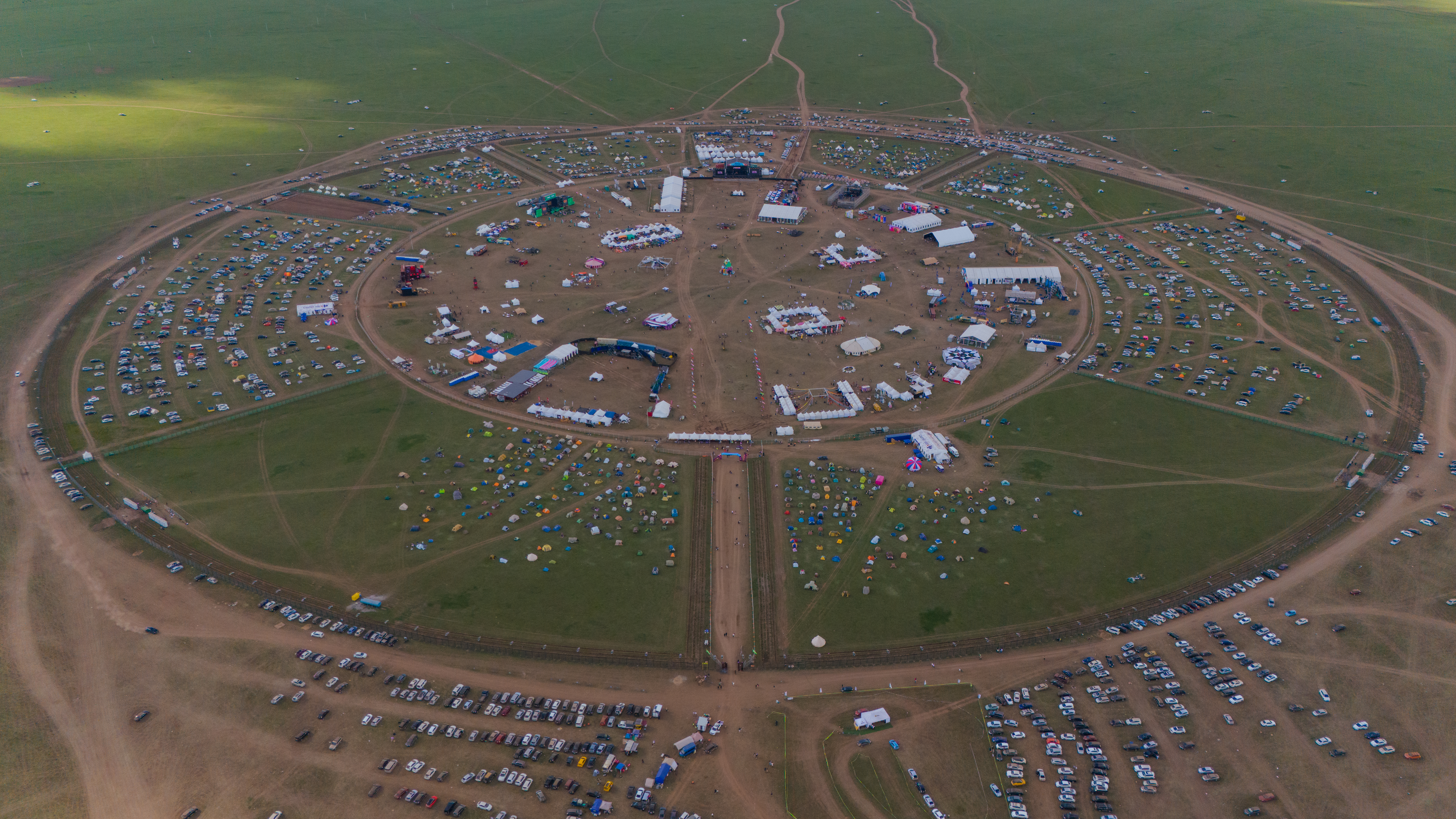
- Playtime Festival 2024 in Nalaikh, Ulaanbaatar
- Genre: rock, pop, indie, hip-hop, metal, electronic music
- Locations: Playtime Field, Nalaikh, Ulaanbaatar
- Coordinates: 47°42'14.5"N 107°25'02.5"E
- Country: Mongolia
- Years active: 2002–present
- Founder: Natsagdorj "George" Tserendorj
- Next event: July 2-4, 2027
- Attendance: 94,000
- Capacity: 30,000
- Organiser: 1737 Entertainment
- Website: https://playtimefestival.com/

Playtime Music Festival (commonly referred to as Playtime Festival) is an annual music festival held in Ulaanbaatar, Mongolia. The festival was founded by Natsagdorj "George" Tserendorj in 2002. He continues to serve as the festival's head programmer, playing a crucial role in its development and success. As of 2026, Playtime Festival is the largest and longest-running annual music festival in Mongolia. Playtime Festival 2026 will be held from July 2nd to 4th at Playtime Field in Nalaikh, Ulaanbaatar.

Traditionally taking place in early July, the weekend before Naadam, the festival features a diverse lineup of local and international acts, featuring genres such as rock, pop, indie, hip-hop, metal and electronic music. In 2026, the festival was held from July 2nd to 4th at the newly established Playtime Field in Nalaikh, Ulaanbaatar. This venue is approximately 50 kilometers from the city center, accommodates up to 30,000 attendees daily and emphasizes sustainability with eco-friendly initiatives.

== History ==
=== 2002 - 2008: Beginnings ===
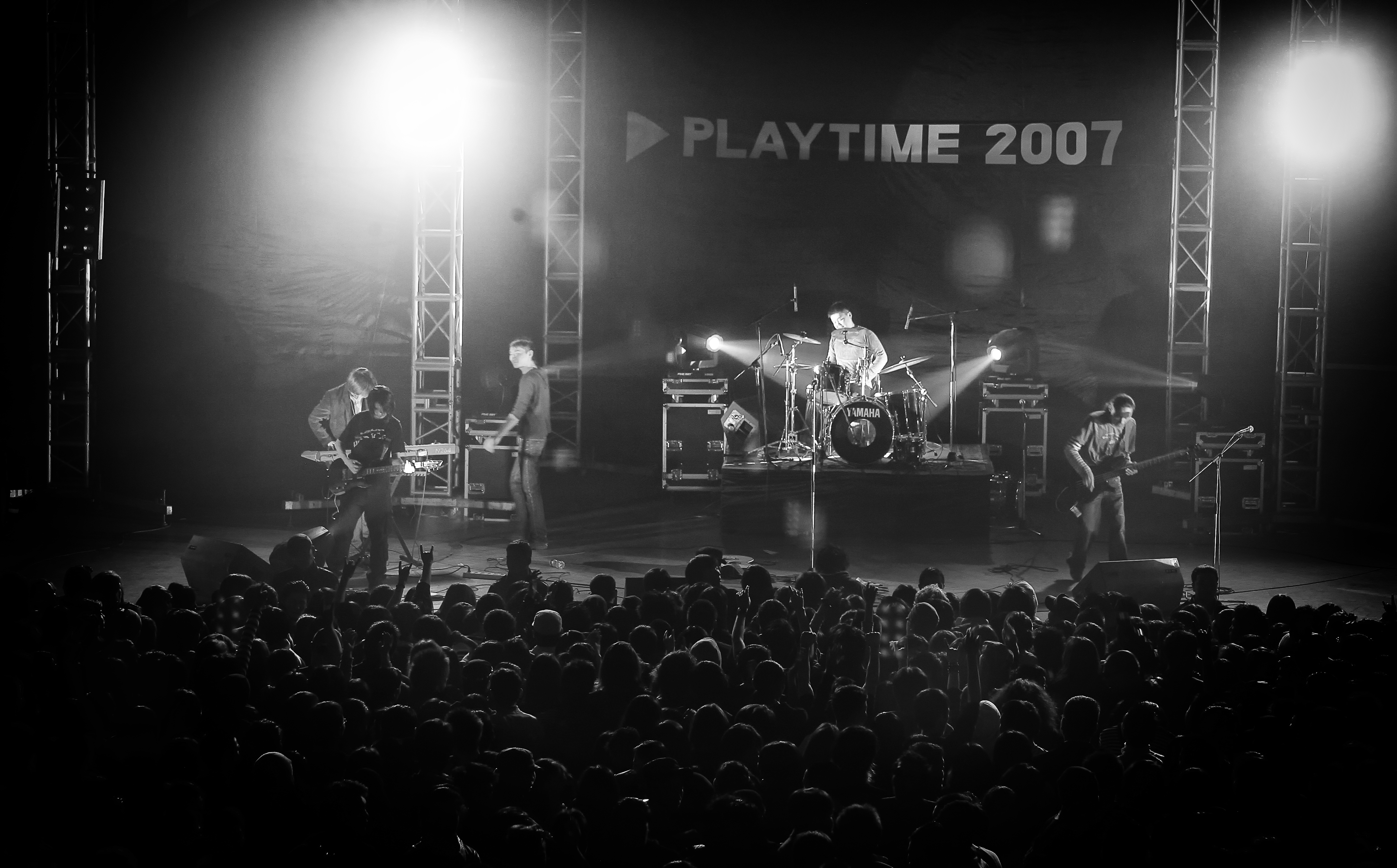
Playtime Festival 2007, UB Palace, Ulaanbaatar, Mongolia.

The festival began as a one-day event at UB Palace concert venue in the center of Ulaanbatar. The lineup featured Mongolia's emerging wave of rock, metal, and indie acts from the late 1990s and early 2000s, including notable bands such as Nisvanis, Night Train, The Lemons, A-Sound, Mohanik, and Starfish.

=== 2008 - 2019: Outdoor festival ===
In 2008, the festival transitioned to an outdoor format for the first time, held in the Zaisan, Khanbogd area, and expanded to a two-day event. This marked the beginning of its camping-style format.

From 2009 onwards, Playtime Festival was hosted at Mongol Shiltgeen in Gachuurt Village, on the outskirts of Ulaanbaatar. In 2014, the festival introduced a new electronic music stage named "Naaglihats" (derived from the Mongolian word for electricity, "tsahilgaan," spelled backwards), providing a platform for DJs and expanding its musical offerings. By 2016, the festival had grown to three days and included five stages.

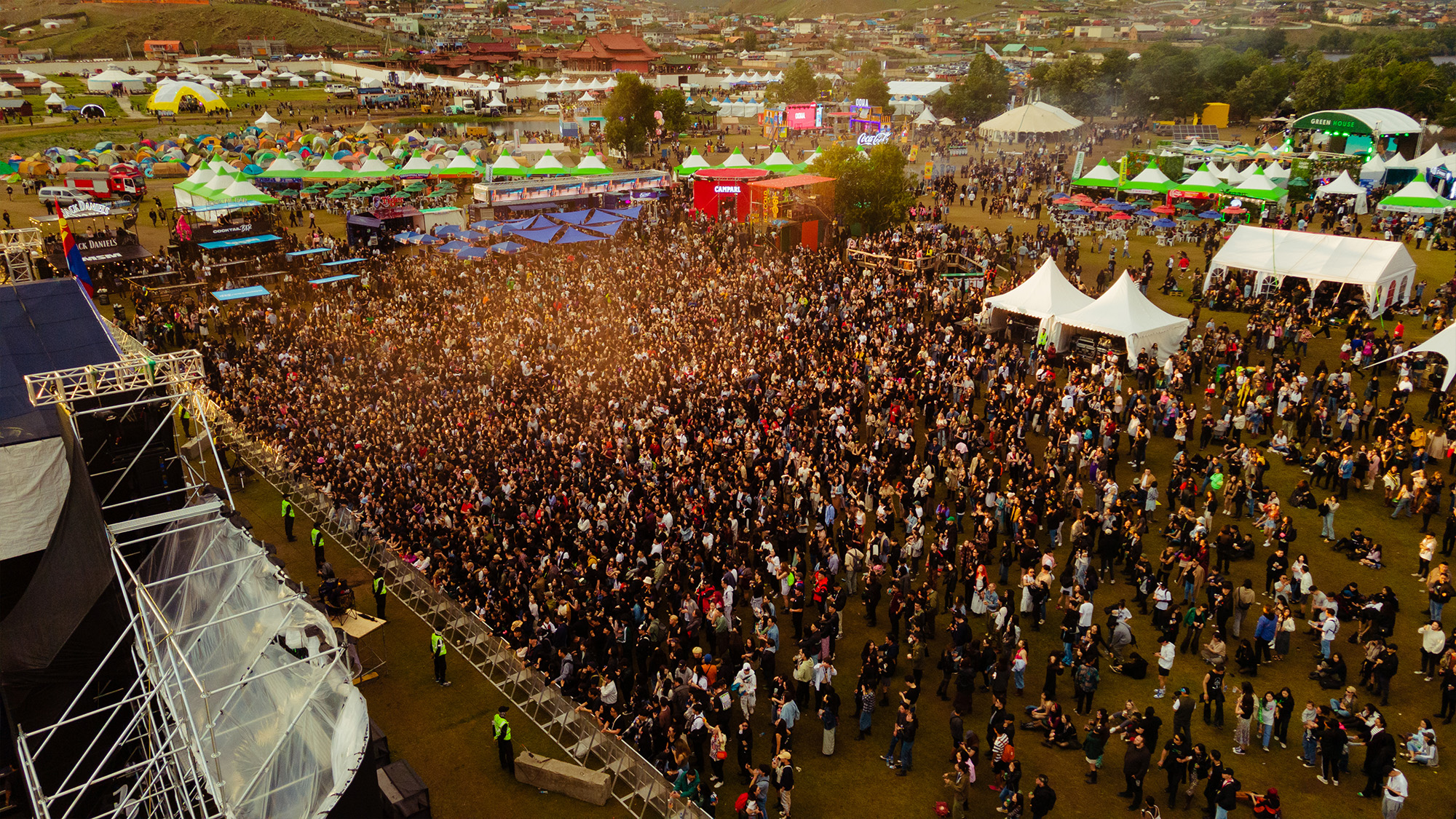
Playtime Festival 2023 at Gachuurt Village, Ulaanbaatar

In the subsequent years, Playtime Festival broadened its scope to encompass arts and cultural programs alongside eco-friendly sustainability initiatives. The 2020 and 2021 editions were held virtually due to the COVID-19 pandemic, they were both live broadcast on IPTV in Mongolia with the title "Playtime Virtual 2020" and "Playtime Virtual 2021 2.0"

=== 2022: 20th Anniversary ===
The 2022 festival marked its 20th anniversary, celebrated with a grand four-day event from July 7 to 10. As highlighted by founder Natsagdorj Tserendorj in the Playtime 20th Anniversary photobook, "Mongolia's first and largest international music festival, Playtime, has reached a significant milestone as it celebrates its 20-year anniversary." The celebration featured over 2,500 individuals working behind the scenes and on stage, with more than 150 bands and singers performing across 15 stages, making it the most widely attended festival to date. Mongolian fashion brand Michel & Amazonka collaborated with Playtime Festival to present their creative fashion collection in celebration of its 20th anniversary.

In commemoration of the 20th anniversary of Playtime Festival, a documentary film titled "TIME TO PLAY" was released on July 5, 2022. The documentary looks back on the formulation and history of Playtime Festival, and the lasting impact it has had in the contemporary music, arts and cultural scene of Mongolia. The founder and programmer Natsagdorj "George" Tserendorj, as well as other influential figures who worked behind the scene of the festival share their stories. Mongolian publishing house BROSCODE published the first print media photobook of Playtime Festival in May, 2023. The photo book is a visual collection of the festival's 20-year history.

=== 2024 - Present: New era of the festival ===
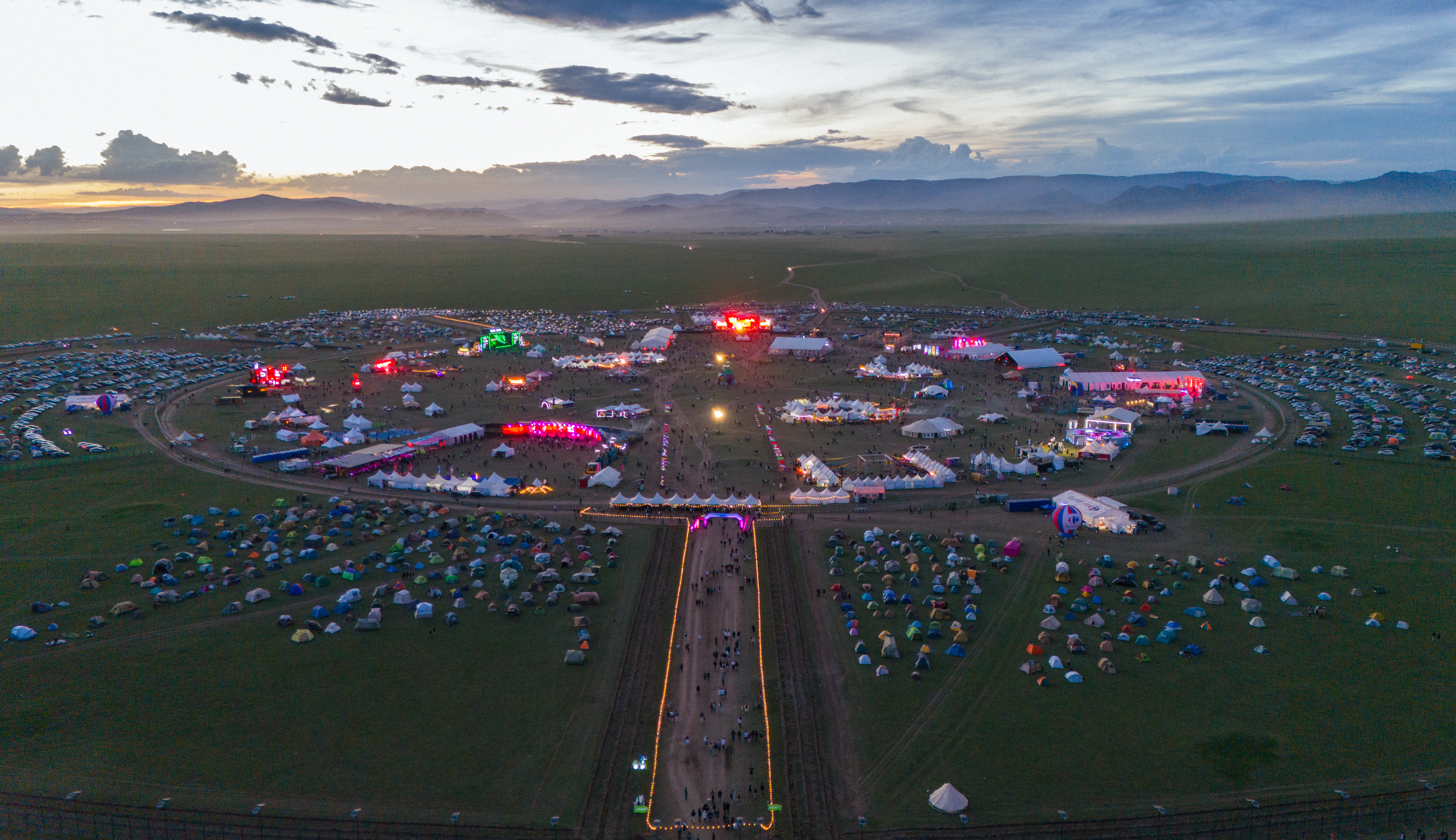
Night view of the festival entrance, Playtime Field, Nalaikh, Ulaanbaatar.

In 2024, Playtime Festival relocated to a new venue named Playtime Field, situated in the Nalaikh area of Ulaanbaatar, approximately 50 kilometers from the city center. The new venue has a daily capacity of 30,000 people and represents a significant step in the festival's commitment to sustainability, featuring a botanical garden, self-sustainable clean energy solutions, and an eco-friendly camping site. This year, 50 international artists from 21 countries were announced to perform at the festival. The new field is circular shaped resembling the traditional Mongolian dwelling "ger" shape.

== Stages ==
Playtime Festival has 7 stages each representing a unique range of genres.

No	Stage Name	Genres
1	Main Stage	All genres, Rock, Indie, Hip-Hop, Reggae, Electronic
2	Naaglihats	Electronic, Techno
3	BNKR	Rock, Post Rock, Punk, Indie
4	Fire	Hardcore Electronic
5	Grove	Electronic, House
6	Waldo	World Music, Acoustic
7	La Vie en Rose	Jazz, Acoustic
8	989 Tent	Live Music Stage (Newly added in 2026)

== Lineup ==
Playtime Festival began hosting international headliner artist from 2013 onwards. Previous lineup consisted of local famous musical acts of Mongolia.

Year	Artist Headliners	DJ Headliners	Dates	Location
2013	MONO · Nisvanis · The Lemons · A-Sound · Bolor Hamtlag		July 27–28	Hotel Mongolia, Gachuurt
2014	Peter Hook & The Light · Мумий Тролль · Khonkh Hamtlag · envy	Leather Nation · Big Up! · Discotheque · Metallium · Smooth Operator	July 19–20	Hotel Mongolia, Gachuurt
2015	The Pains of Being Pure at Heart · Niciton · Nine Treasures	Bodikhuu · eamar · Enkoolion · Tuvshin · BTR	June 27–28	Hotel Mongolia, Gachuurt
2016	The Radio Dept · Roth Bart Baron · Ayasin Salhi · The You	TMK · Mara · Bodikhuu · Baatar · Bud ·	June 24–26	Hotel Mongolia, Gachuurt
2017	The fin · Haranga · Magnolian · One Sentence Supervisor · Daisy & Gang · The Jazz Train	Sinkichi · Bilguudei · TMK · Deez · Demi Moors · Mara · Henza	July 7–9	Hotel Mongolia, Gachuurt
2018	Ariel Pink · The Colors · Khuh Tenger · Surug Huch · Lite	Albert Van Abbe · Claudio PRS · Leather Nation	July 6–8	Hotel Mongolia, Gachuurt
2019	Yo La Tengo · Sunset Rollercoaster · The Wedding Present · TITEM · Ice Top · Ginjin · LEO37 +SOSS	ONRA · Tolouse Low Trax · Blazej Malinowski · Cybersnack · TMK	July 5–7	Hotel Mongolia, Gachuurt
2020	Playtime Virtual 2020			Virtual show was held online.
2021	Playtime Virtual 2021 2.0			Virtual show was held online.
2022	Alcest · MONO · Motorama · Altan Urag · Sarantuya · Soyol Erdene 50 · Vanquish · Bulsara · Hurd	I Hate Models · Lokier · Bodikhuu · Giin · Bilguudei · Damie · Anetha · Marcus L · Boris	July 7–10	Hotel Mongolia, Gachuurt
2023	Cigarettes After Sex · Carsick Cars · Shortparis · Delkhii · Motorama	Marcel Dettmann · Rikhter · Ogazón · Gerlee Merlee · Mara	July 6–8	Hotel Mongolia, Gachuurt
2024	Teenage Fanclub · Deafheaven · OSEES · Elephant Gym · Night Train · IDIOTAPE · Teresa in the Moon · Ineemseglel · toe · mitsume	Ben Klock · Aisha Devi · Alex Kassian · Lindstrøm · Spaniol · Lipelis · MCMLXXXV · cem · Dasha Rush · ONRA	July 4–7	Playtime Field, Nalaikh
2025	Alcest · envy · Balming Tiger · Silica Gel · YHWH Nailgun · Megumi Acorda · VVAS · Mohanik · Magnolian · Mxrningstar · Starfish · Growl of Clown · Batavia Collective	Ellen Allien · Klangkuenstler · Jennifer Cardini · Aurora Halal · Belief Defect · Mama Snake · Pariah · Albert van Abbe · Jazzy Sport HQ · Vitess to Grand V	July 3–6	Playtime Field, Nalaikh
2026	Molchat Doma · HYUKOH · Stereolab · Kings of Convenience · DIIV · Shing02 + OMA with SPINMASTER A-1 · CSI Preludio: Ferretti/Zamboni · Fat Hamster & Kang New · Enji · Horse Radio	Helena Hauff · Diskonnected · JASSS · DJ Stungray 313 · Jesse You · Lord Spikeheart	July 2-4	Playtime Field, Nalaikh
2027	To be announced		July 2-4	Playtime Field, Nalaikh

=== Notes ===
- The 3rd day of Playtime Festival in 2023, July 8th was cancelled due to the surging flood levels of Tuul river next to the festival venue, Hotel Mongolia. The artists slatted to perform on the 3rd day were scheduled to perform the following year.
- The 19th and 20th edition of Playtime Festival were originally scheduled to be held at Hotel Mongolia, Gachuurt respectively on July 3-5, 2020 and July 16-18, 2021. However, they were both cancelled before the planned dates due to the COVID-19 pandemic. The lineup of these 2 years consisted of only Mongolian artists and the performance videos of the artist are available on Playtime Festival's Official Youtube Channel.

== See also ==
- Music of Mongolia
