= 2015 in Mongolia =

- Decades: 1990s; 2000s; 2010s; 2020s
- See also: Other events of 2015; Timeline of Mongolian history

Events in the year 2015 in Mongolia.

== Incumbents ==
- President: Tsakhiagiin Elbegdorj
- Prime Minister: Chimediin Saikhanbileg

== Events ==
=== May ===
- 1 May – Establishment of Ulaanbaatar Securities Exchange.

=== July ===
- 3–5 July – 2015 Judo Grand Prix Ulaanbaatar in Ulaanbaatar.

=== December ===
- 4 December – Official opening of Amgalan Thermal Power Plant in Bayanzürkh, Ulaanbaatar.
