= 2022 in Mongolia =

- Decades: 2000s; 2010s; 2020s
- See also: Other events of 2022; Timeline of Mongolian history

Events in the year 2022 in Mongolia.

== Incumbents ==
- President: Ukhnaagiin Khürelsükh
- Prime Minister: Luvsannamsrain Oyun-Erdene

== Events ==
- 18 May – The opening of Gobi Museum of Nature and History in Dalanzadgad, Ömnögovi Province.
- 24–26 June – 2022 Judo Grand Slam Ulaanbaatar in Ulaanbaatar.
- 19 September – Mongolia puts Khovd Province under quarantine after a case of bubonic plague was confirmed.
- 5 December – 2022 Mongolian protests.

== Disasters ==
- 2022 Mongolian wildfires

== Sport ==
- 2022 Judo Grand Slam Ulaanbaatar
- Mongolia at the 2022 Winter Olympics
- Mongolia at the 2022 Winter Paralympics
