= 2021 in Mongolia =

Coordinates: 48°N 106°E

- Decades: 2000s; 2010s; 2020s
- See also: Other events of 2021; Timeline of Mongolian history

Mongolia ᠮᠣᠩᠭᠣᠯ ᠤᠯᠤᠰ Монгол Улс (Mongolian)
- Location of 2021 in Mongolia (green)
- Capital and largest city: Ulaanbaatar
- Official languages: Mongolian
- Official scripts: Cyrillic; Mongolian
- Demonym: Mongol
- ISO 3166 code: MN

Mongolia (/mɒnˈɡoʊliə/, Mongolian: Монгол Улс, transcription: Mongol Uls, Traditional Mongolian: ᠮᠤᠩᠭᠤᠯ ᠤᠯᠤᠰ, transliteration: Mongγol ulus) is a landlocked country in East Asia. Its area is roughly equivalent with the historical territory of Outer Mongolia, which is sometimes used to refer to the current state. It is situated between Russia to the north and China to the south, where it neighbours the Inner Mongolia Autonomous Region. Mongolia does not share a border with Kazakhstan, although only 37 kilometres (23 miles) separate them.

This is a list of individuals and events related to Mongolia in 2021.

== Incumbents ==
Photo	Post	Name
	President of Mongolia	Khaltmaagiin Battulga (until 25 June)
	President of Mongolia	Ukhnaagiin Khürelsükh (starting 25 June)
	Prime Minister of Mongolia	Ukhnaagiin Khürelsükh (until 27 January)
	Prime Minister of Mongolia	Luvsannamsrain Oyun-Erdene (starting 27 January)
	Chairman of the Khural	Gombojavyn Zandanshatar

== Events ==
=== Ongoing ===
- COVID-19 pandemic in Mongolia

=== January ===
- 2021 Khövsgöl earthquake

=== April ===
- April 16 - The Constitutional Court of Mongolia ruled that some elements in the Law on Presidential Elections are unconstitutional, effectively ruling that President Battulga is ineligible to run for reelection.
- April 18 - Mongolian President Battulga Khaltmaa issued a decree dissolving the Mongolian People’s Party.
- April 30 - Mongolian Parliament officially adopts a decree to provide protection on human rights defenders. According to United Nations OHCHR, Mongolia is the first country in Asia to adopt such measure, giving hopes on further commitment on human rights in Mongolia and the region.

== See also ==
- Outline of Mongolia
- List of Mongolia-related topics
- History of Mongolia
