= 1991 in Mongolia =

- Decades: 1970s; 1980s; 1990s; 2000s; 2010s
- See also: Other events of 1991; Timeline of Mongolian history

Events in the year 1991 in Mongolia.

== Incumbents ==
- President: Punsalmaagiin Ochirbat
- Prime Minister: Dashiin Byambasüren

== Events ==
- 18 January – The establishment of Mongolian Stock Exchange.
