= Magnolian =

Mongolian musician

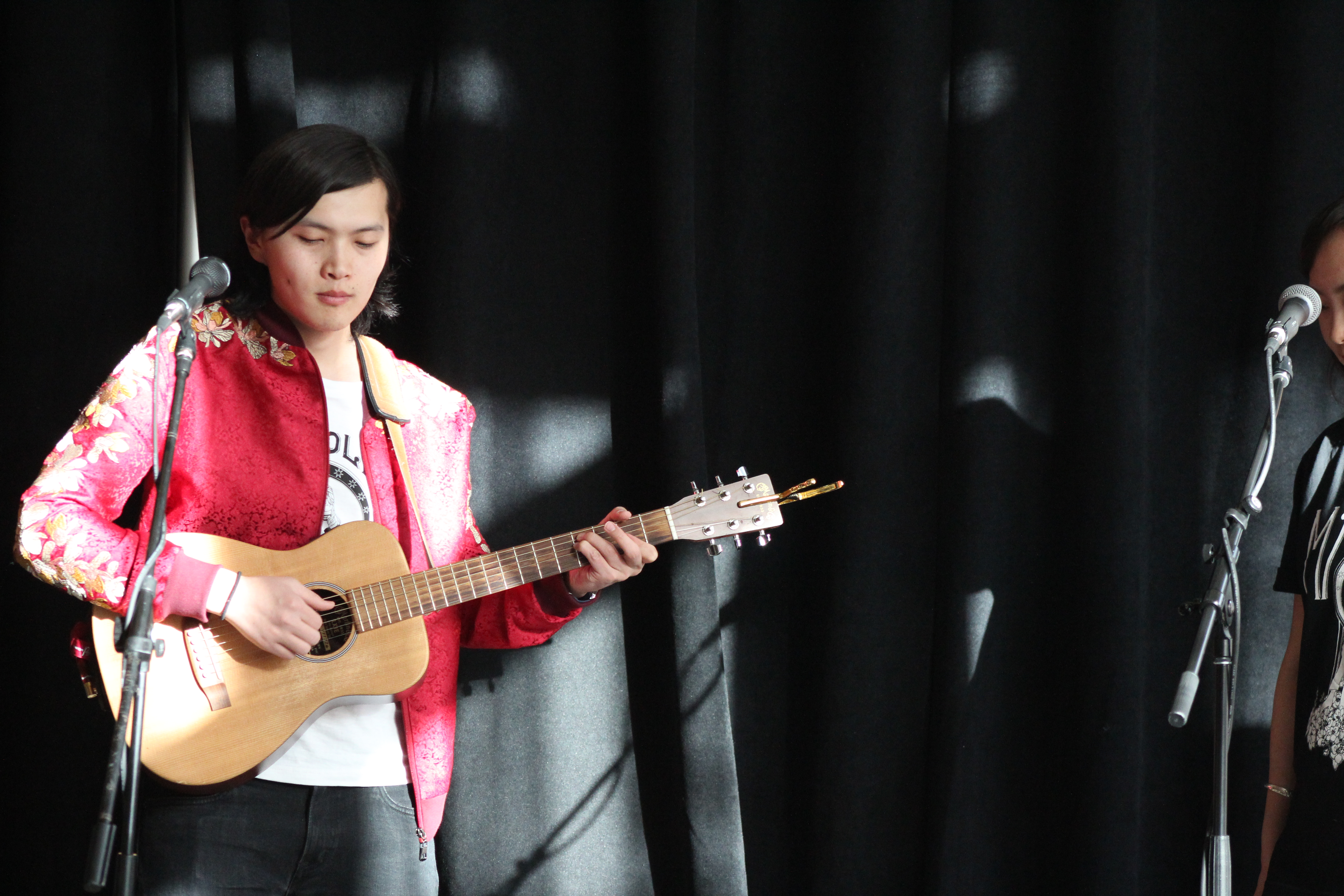

Background information
- Born: Dulguun Bayasgalan; 27 April 1991 (age 35)
- Origin: Ulaanbaatar, Mongolia
- Genre: Indie rock, indie folk, pop, folk rock
- Years active: 2015–present
- Website: magnolianmusic.com

Dulguun Bayasgalan, better known under his stage name Magnolian is a Mongolian indie folk artist, singer-songwriter, filmmaker, and entrepreneur. He sings in both Mongolian and English and describes himself as a crooner.

On Spotify, Magnolian is the third most-streamed Mongolian artist after The Hu and Bodikhuu.

== Biography ==
Dulguun was born on 27 April 1991 in Ulaanbaatar, Mongolia. He is the son of Munkhtsetseg Chultem and Bayasgalan Danzandorj, one of the founders of Golomt Bank and Bodi International.

In 2014, he chose the stage name Magnolian (a pun based on the similarity of the words "Mongolia" and "magnolia") to avoid being confused with another Mongolian artist who had the same name, Dulguun. Magnolian's career in music began in 2015 when he performed as the only solo act at Mongolia's largest music festival, Playtime Festival. Soon after this performance he released his first EP Famous Men. 2016 marked Mangolian's first performance abroad, in South Korea. In 2017, he performed at the South by Southwest festival in Austin, Texas. In 2018, Dulguun co-founded the Fat Cat Jazz Club, one of the most successful venues operating in Ulaanbaatar. Magnolian's discography features significantly in Hideo Kojima's 2025 video game Death Stranding 2: On the Beach, including an original song written specifically for the game, "Woods".

== Career ==
2015 - Debuted his song "Someday", performed at the first Playtime Festival
2016 - Release of his first EP, "Famous Men"
2017 - Showcased at SXSW & Zandari Festa
2018 - Founding of the Fat Cat Jazz Club
2019 - Debuted acting performance for the feature film, Od & Gegee
2020 - Release of his first full-length album, Slow Burn
2021 - His music was featured on Outer Banks (TV series) on Netflix
2024 - Co-composed for If Only I Could Hibernate OST
2025 - His songs, along with a new release "Woods," were featured on Death Stranding 2: On the Beach video game

== Discography ==
Studio Albums

Slow Burn (2020)

EPs

Famous Men (2016)

Singles

Someday (2015)
Crimson (2022)
Aj Bogdiin Haruul (2024)
Baavgai Bolohson (2024)
