= 2023 in Mongolia =

- Decades: 2000s; 2010s; 2020s
- See also: Other events of 2023; Timeline of Mongolian history

Events in the year 2023 in Mongolia.

== Incumbents ==
- President: Ukhnaagiin Khürelsükh
- Prime Minister: Luvsannamsrain Oyun-Erdene

== Events ==
- 28 April – The groundbreaking ceremony for the construction of Dornod–Sainshand Oil Pipeline.
- 5 July – Mongolian prime minister Luvsannamsrain Oyun-Erdene places Ulaanbaatar on "high alert" due to severe flooding caused by unprecedented rainfall, forcing hundreds of people to evacuate.
- 6–7 July – 22nd Playtime Festival in Bayanzürkh, Ulaanbaatar.
- 1 September – Pope Francis arrives in Mongolia, marking the first papal visit to the country, which has a small Catholic population.
- 14 September – The official opening of Center for the Development of People with Disabilities in Darkhan City, Darkhan-Uul Province.

== Sport ==
- 2023 East Asian Youth Games
