= Nyamjav Urtnasan =

Mongolian politician (born 1975)

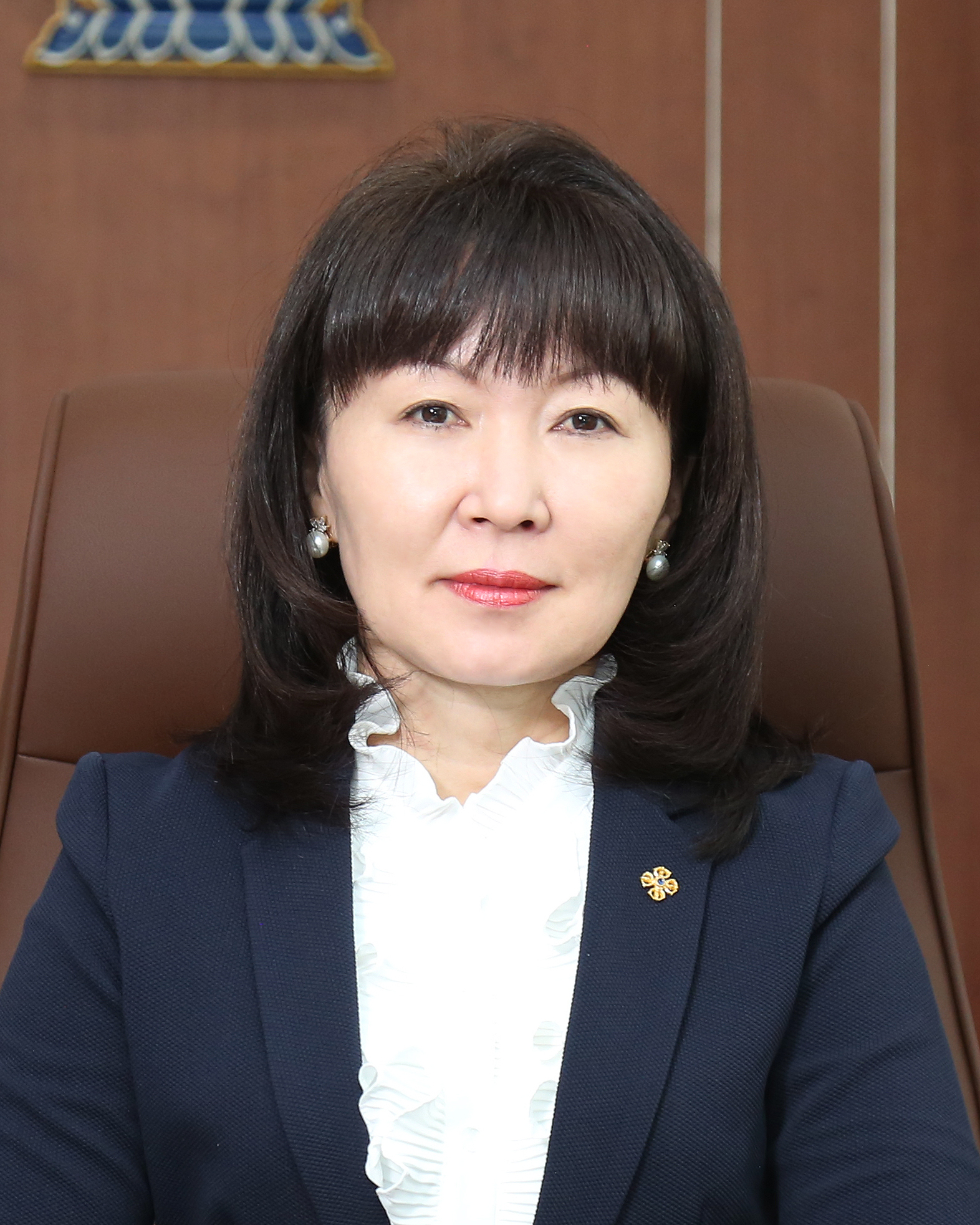
Urtnasan in 2021

Nyamjav Urtnasan (Mongolian: Нямжавын Уртнасан, born 1975) is a Mongolian politician.

== Early life and education ==
Urtnasan was born in 1975 in Selenge Province. She has a bachelor's degree in journalism from the National University of Mongolia, and studied environmental journalism in Japan and Germany. She worked at Eagle TV from 1998 to 2000 as a journalist and the head of the news service. Later posts included work at the Mongolian National Broadcaster where she reported on the environment and responsible mining.

== Political career ==
Urtnasan was one of four women appointed as cabinet ministers by new president Luvsannamsrain Oyun-Erdene in February 2021. She served as Minister for Environment and Tourism until 16 January 2022 when she was dismissed as it was said that she had "failed to achieve results in the implementation of policy for reducing air pollution and to realise certain assignments given by the Prime Minister."
