= Dashbaldangiin Purevsuren =

Mongolian singer (1929–2025)

- Дашбалдангийн Пүрэвсүрэн Mongolian script: ᠳᠠᠰᠢᠪᠠᠯᠳᠠᠩ ᠤᠨ ᠫᠦᠷᠪᠦᠰᠦ᠋ᠷᠦᠩ
- Born: 1929; Bulgan soum, Bulgan Province, Mongolia
- Died: 3 January 2025 (aged 95); Ulaanbaatar, Mongolia
- Occupation: Opera singer
- Spouse: Noroviin Baatar (died 2024)
- Awards: People's Artist of Mongolia (2024), Honored Artist of Mongolia (1961), Order of the Polar Star (1956)

Dashbaldangiin Purevsuren or Purevsuren Dashbaldan (Cyrillic Mongolian: Д. Пүрэвсүрэн; Traditional Mongolian: ᠳ ∙ ᠫᠦᠷᠪᠦᠰᠦ᠋ᠷᠦᠩ; 1929 – 3 January 2025) was a Mongolian opera singer, a soloist of Mongolian State Academic Theatre of Opera and Ballet, a military officer of the Mongolian border patrol, and a highly esteemed figure in Mongolian performing arts. She was awarded the title of People's Artist of Mongolia in 2024 and the title of Meritorious Artist of Mongolia in 1961, recognizing her significant contributions to opera and singing culture of the country.

== Early life and career ==
Purevsuren was born in 1929 in Bogdkhan aimag Bulgan-Uuliin khoshuu (present-day Bulgan soum) in the People's Republic of Mongolia. Purevsuren's father, Dashbaldan, a herder and hunter, raised her alone after his wife died young. Purevsuren joined Bulgan Aimag's volunteer artist club at the age of 8 and performed as a poor monk boy in the popular play The Adopted Pearl [Өргөмөл Сувд] at that time.

On 16 March 1942, at the age of 13, she joined the Border Military Ensemble of the Ministry of Internal Affairs as a singer. She quickly progressed and was certified as the second-ranked singer in 1945, and in 1947, she was promoted to a mid-ranking military officer.

== Professional opera career ==
In 1948, Purevsuren was transferred to the State Musical Drama Theatre, also known as the "Green Dome" (Бөмбөгөр ногоон), which later became the Mongolian State Academic Theatre of Opera and Ballet. She continued to work there as an opera singer, contributing to the establishment and development of Mongolian opera until her retirement in late 1985.

Purevsuren made a cameo appearance in Our Song (1956 Mongolian film) (Манай аялгуу), where she sang in a duet. She performed and studied in North Korea, Russia, Germany and China. In 1961, she completed the art class at the Marxism–Leninism evening college in Ulaanbaatar.

Dashbaldangiin Purevsuren was awarded the title of Honored Artist of Mongolia in 1961, recognizing her significant contributions to the cultural development of the country. Professional art critics highly praised Purevsuren, in particular her role of Norovlkham in the opera Khanburged and both Nansalmaa and Khorolmaa in the Mongolian famous opera Uchirtai Gurvan Tolgoi (The Three Dramatic Characters).

On 23 June 2019, Mongolian State Academic Theatre of Opera and Ballet organized an honorary concert to celebrate Dahsbaldangiin Purevsuren's 90th birthday in Ulaanbaatar, Mongolia.

The President of Mongolia awarded Purevsuren the title of People's Artist of Mongolia on 8 July 2024.

== Personal life and death ==
Purevsuren was married to Mongolia's Meritorious Artist Noroviin Baatar, a leading professional ballet dancer in Mongolia. Baatar died on 25 September 2024.

Purevsuren died in Ulaanbaatar on 3 January 2025, at the age of 95.

== Honours and awards ==
- People's Artist of Mongolia (2024)
- Honorary Border Guard (1983)
- Excellent Border Guard (1980)
- Honored Artist of Mongolia (1961)
- Order of the Polar Star (1956)

== List of Operatic Roles and Songs Performed by D. Purevsuren ==
1	Operatic Roles	Nansalmaa (Учиртай гурван толгой дуурь)
2	Operatic Roles	Khorolmaa (Учиртай гурван толгой дуурь)
3	Operatic Roles	Khaltan (Жаргалт зам дуурь)
4	Operatic Roles	Queen Ordonmago (Орданмого хатан - Шарай голын гурван хаан)
5	Operatic Roles	Dulamsuren (Тэмцэл дуурь)
6	Operatic Roles	Unaga (Хөхөө намжил дуурь)
7	Operatic Roles	Yalma (Ялмаа)
8	Operatic Roles	Norovlkham (Канцлер дуурь)
9	Operatic Roles	Elder Woman (Нэгэн эмэгтэй)
10	Operatic Roles	Olga (Лусын дагина дуурь)
11	Operatic Roles	Lena (Октябрь дуурь)
12	Operatic Roles	Drama: The 21st Century's Life (XXI зуун-д Зуун жилийн эхэнд драм)
13	Operatic Roles	Polovtsian Women (Игров бат хан дуурь)
14	Operatic Roles	Bertha (Сэвэрлийн үсчин дуурь)
15	Operatic Roles	Esmeralda (Смеральда дуурь)
16	Mongolian Folk Songs	The Flapping Bird (Хөх торгон дээл)
17	Mongolian Folk Songs	Blue Silk River (Хөх торгон цамц)
18	Mongolian Folk Songs	Wake Up Breeze (Сэр сэр салхи)
19	Mongolian Folk Songs	Morning Regret (Санжид буруу гөлөм)
20	Mongolian Folk Songs	Solongo (Солонго)
21	Mongolian Folk Songs	The Calf (Ботго)
22	Mongolian Folk Songs	Hand's Ten Fingers (Гарын арван хуруу)
23	Mongolian Folk Songs	Rainy Days (Борооны үүл)
24	Mongolian Folk Songs	The White Collar (Эрүү цагаан болжмор)
25	Mongolian Folk Songs	Love's Path (Аргагүй амраг)
26	Mongolian Folk Songs	The Corner of the Soul (Судлийн уул)
27	Mongolian Folk Songs	Sandy Mountain Range (Тахиан зандан уул)
28	Mongolian Folk Songs	Mother's Care (Эхийн ач)
29	Mongolian Folk Songs	Nutty Tree (Самартай мод)
30	Mongolian Folk Songs	Wild Goose (Янгир зоотой шарга)
31	Mongolian Folk Songs	Steppe River (Кондойн гол)
32	Mongolian Folk Songs	Black Stallion (Хандмаа)
33	Mongolian Folk Songs	Small Tree (Ганди мод)
34	Mongolian Folk Songs	My Homeland (Өөрийн нутаг)
35	Mongolian Folk Songs	The Blue River (Нуур амат шаазгай)
36	Mongolian Folk Songs	National River (Улзын гол)
37	Mongolian Folk Songs	Colorful Horse (Цоохор морь)
38	Foreign Songs	Govot
39	Foreign Songs	What Do I Live For? (Что мне жить и тужить)
40	Foreign Songs	Volga River (Волга реченька)
41	Foreign Songs	Two Swallows (Две ласточки)
42	Foreign Songs	Roadway (Дорожная)
43	Foreign Songs	Roman Corsair (Римский корсар)
44	Foreign Songs	Snow Maiden's Aria (Ария снегурочки)
45	Foreign Songs	Mussorgsky's Fair (Мусоргский сорчинская ярмарка)
46	Foreign Songs	Gypsy Passion (Цыгане страсть)
47	Korean Songs	No Dyl Chan Bion (Но дыль чан бион)
48	Korean Songs	Arirang (Ариран)
49	Korean Songs	Pal Chan Gio (Паль чан гио)
50	Korean Songs	Yakson Ton Dze (Яксан тон дээ)
