= Hotel Mongolia =

Hotel in Bayanzürkh, Ulaanbaatar, Mongolia

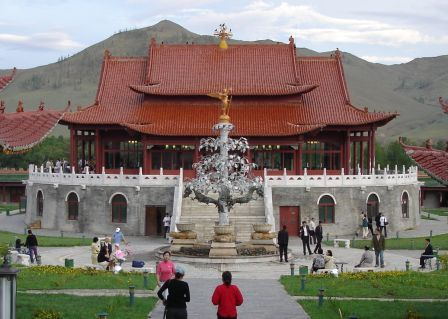
- Silver Tree Fountain in the castle

- Location in Mongolia
- Alternative names: Mongol Shiltgeen Hotel

General information
- Location: Bayanzürkh, Ulaanbaatar, Mongolia
- Coordinates: 47°55′27″N 107°08′29″E

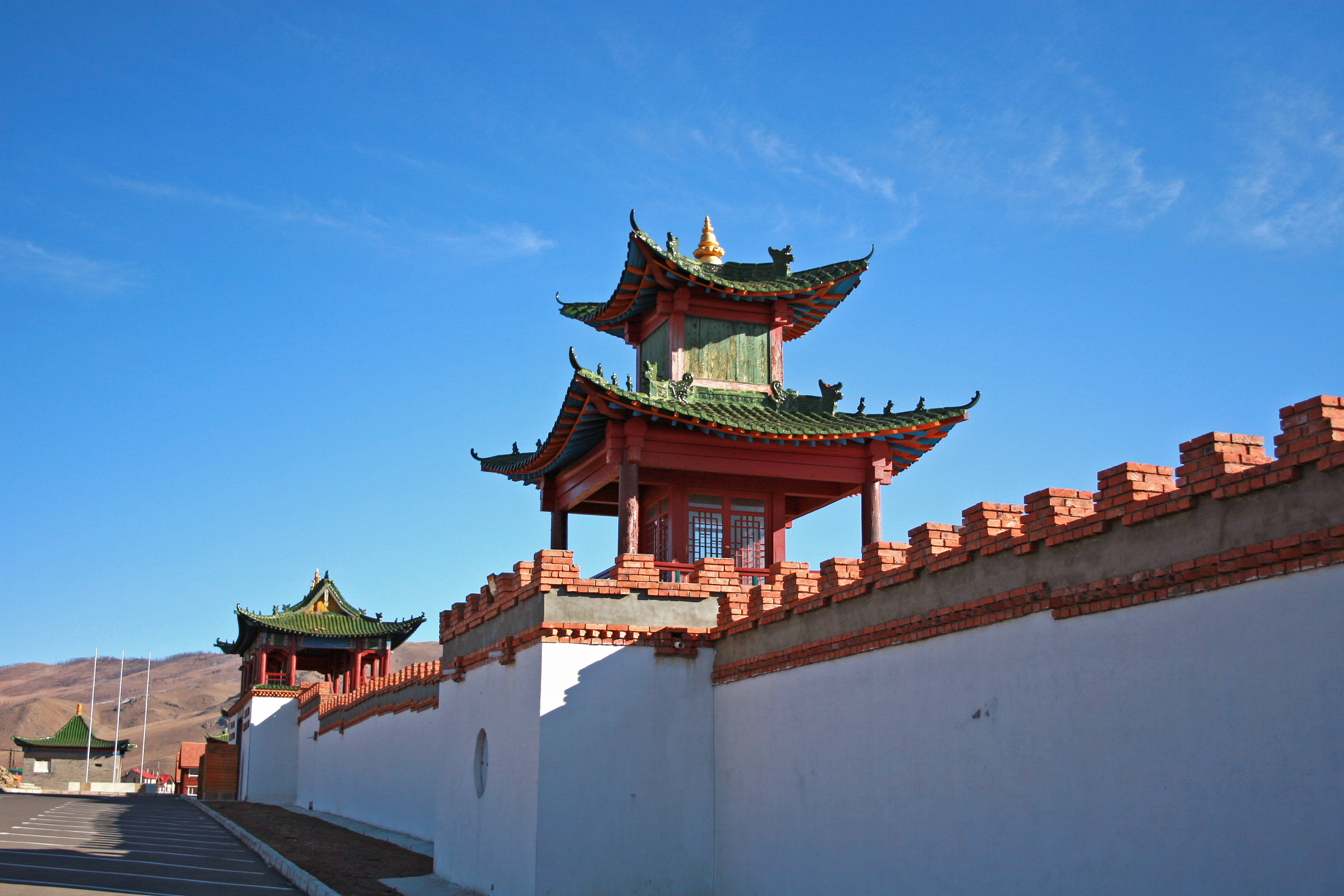
Walls of the castle

Hotel Mongolia (Mongolian: Монгол Шилтгээн, Mongol Shiltgeen) is a hotel in the form of a mock castle near Gachuurt village, in the Bayanzürkh district of Ulaanbaatar, Mongolia. It claims to be the only resort hotel in the country.

Built in 2003, it is surrounded by a fortress wall with gates on the 4 sides and towers at the corners. Inside the fortress are Asian style houses and yurts, which serve as hotel rooms.

There is a restaurant in the central "palace". The hotel lies on the bank of the Tuul River. The southern gate links to a riverside beach and an open sky stage for rock performances.

The hotel is designed to resemble the ancient capital of Karakorum. The hotel is furnished in handmade carvings. One of the attractions is the Silver Tree fountain inspired by the Silver Tree of the ancient city of Karakorum. The central gatehouse displays an exhibition of the coins brought from all parts of the Mongol Empire.

The complex is a venue for rock festivals, wedding celebrations and international conferences. It hosted the 10th Conference of Sakyadhita, the International Association of Buddhist Women, in July 2008.

The hotel was featured in Season 10 of The Amazing Race.

== See also ==
- Architecture of Mongolia
