= Vision 2050 (Mongolia) =

Mongolian government program

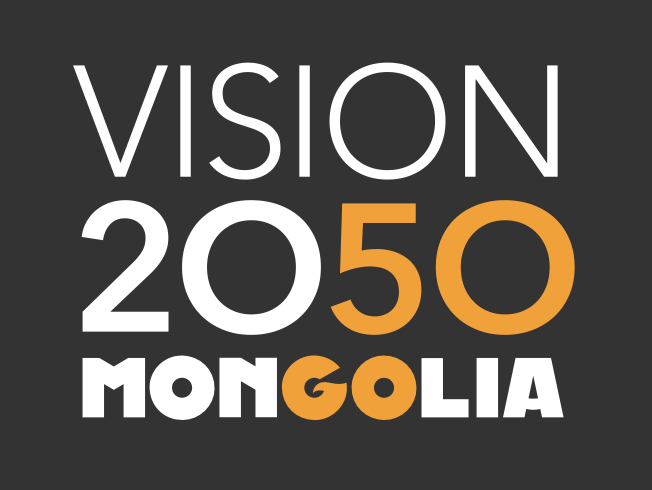

Development policy program overview
- Formed: 13 May 2020
- Jurisdiction: Government of Mongolia
- Minister responsible: Luvsannamsrain Oyun-Erdene, Prime Minister of Mongolia
- Website: vision2050.gov.mn/eng/

Vision 2050 is a government program launched by the Government of Mongolia which aims to improve social development, economic growth, and quality of life in the country. It was ratified by the Mongolian Parliament on May 13, 2020.

== Overview ==
The Vision 2050 policy is divided into three separate stages: 2021–2030, 2031–2040, and 2041–2050, and is centered around nine objectives relating to:

1. Shared National Values
2. Human Development
3. Quality of Life and Middle Class
4. Economic Growth
5. Governance
6. Green Development
7. Safe and Secure Society
8. Regional and Local Development
9. Ulaanbaatar and Satellite Cities

== Initiatives ==
=== Google partnership ===
In August 2023, the Government of Mongolia and Google announced a partnership to provide 20,000 Chromebooks to Mongolian schools. The partnership looks to help modernize existing devices and offer educational certifications and scholarships in the country. Google also committed to installing ChromeOS Flex onto existing Macs and PCs in Mongolian schools, and provide 1,000 scholarships for Google Career Certificates.

=== E-Mongolia ===
In October 2020, the Government of Mongolia introduced its e-governance platform E-Mongolia which provides over 1,200 services from 86 separate organizations. The associated app had over 1.7 million users, as of November 2024.

== See also ==
- Government of Mongolia
