= 2005 in Mongolia =

- Decades: 1980s; 1990s; 2000s; 2010s; 2020s
- See also: Other events of 2005; Timeline of Mongolian history

Events in the year 2005 in Mongolia.

== Incumbents ==
- President: Natsagiin Bagabandi (until 24 June), Nambaryn Enkhbayar (from 24 June)
- Prime Minister: Tsakhiagiin Elbegdorj

== Events ==
- 22 May – 2005 Mongolian presidential election
- 21 November - George Bush visits Ulaanbaatar.

== Births ==
- 7 January – Bat-Erdene Mungunzul, chess player
- 14 February – Ganzorigiin Amartüvshin, chess player
