= 2018 in Mongolia =

- Decades: 1990s; 2000s; 2010s; 2020s
- See also: Other events of 2018; Timeline of Mongolian history

Events in the year 2018 in Mongolia.

== Incumbents ==
- President: Khaltmaagiin Battulga
- Prime Minister: Ukhnaagiin Khürelsükh

== Events ==
- 9–25 February – Mongolia participated at the 2018 Winter Olympics in PyeongChang, South Korea, with 2 competitors in 1 sport (cross-country skiing).
- 21 June – The official opening of Gegeen Solar Power Plant in Zamyn-Üüd, Dornogovi.

== Deaths ==
- 9 April – Jigjidiin Mönkhbat, wrestler, Olympic silver medalist (1968) (b. 1941).
