= Mxrningstar =

Mongolian band

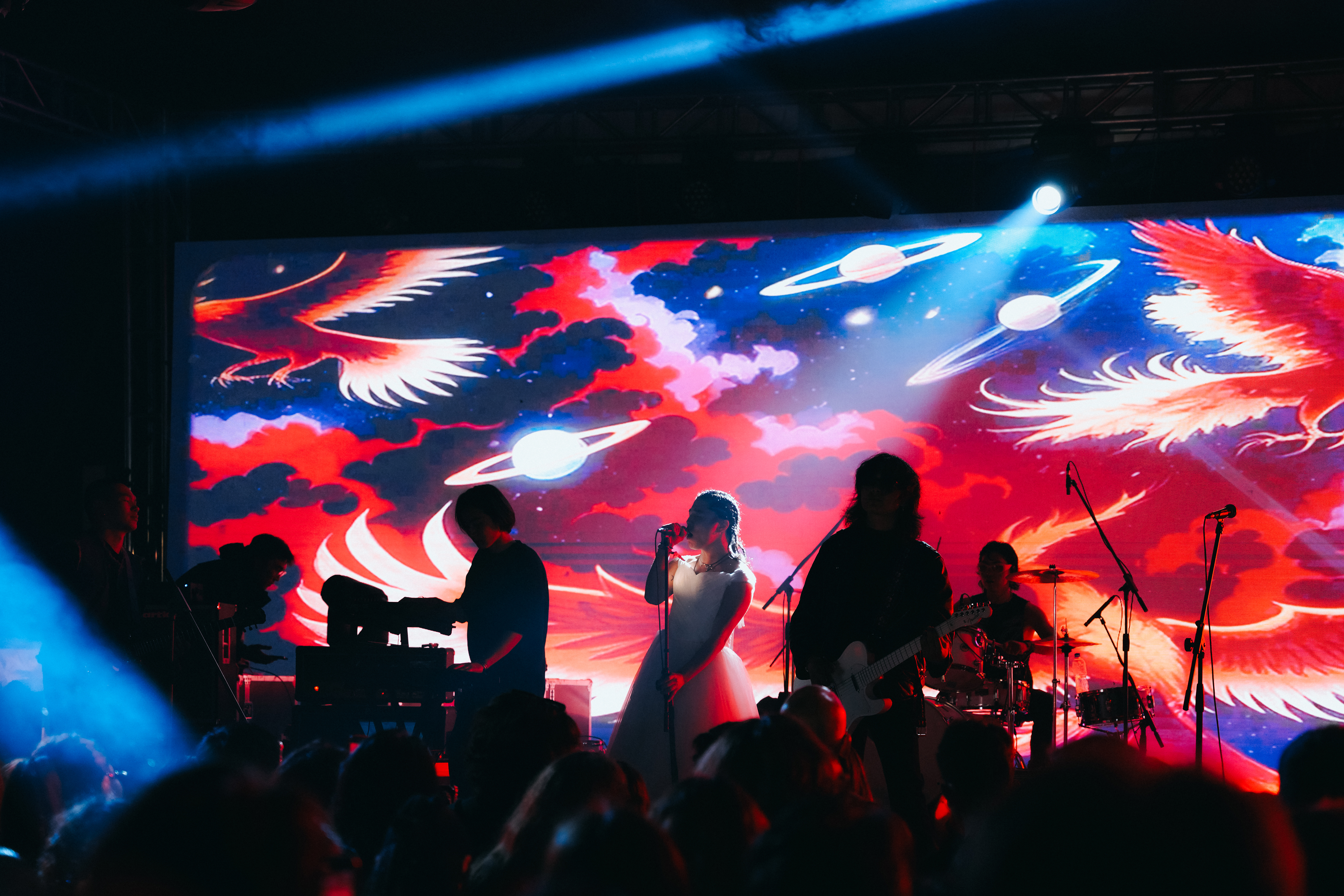

Background information
- Origin: Ulaanbaatar, Mongolia
- Genres: Alternative rock; punk rock; hard rock
- Years active: 2020-present
- Members: Azzaya Buyanbat; Erdenebayar Khishigbayar; Erdenebayar Ganchimeg; Erdenesaikhan Nyamdavaa; Oyunbold Zorig
- Website: mxrningstar.com

Mxrningstar is a Mongolian live music band known for their work in alternative rock and indie rock, featuring a five-member lineup.

== History ==
The band's lead vocalist, B. Azzaya, first gained public recognition in 2019 as a solo artist under the name "Morningstar." In a later interview, Azzaya expressed a desire to form a live music band, leading drummer Kh. Erdenebayar to reach out with a proposal to form a band, resulting in the formation of today's Mxrningstar. Although the band was officially formed in 2020, they released their debut single, "Uurneesee Chi" ("From Your Nest"), on August 10, 2023.

== Music ==
The band released its debut album, Hun ("Human"), with seven tracks on October 22, 2024. The album was recorded at B Production, Library Records, and Eleven Eleven Records, with final mastering completed in the Netherlands. Upon release, the album reached the top 20 of the Mongolian Top 100 songs on Apple Music within its first week.

All songs were written by B. Azzaya, N. Erdenesaikhan, Kh. Erdenebayar, G. Erdenebayar, and Z. Oyunbold except Me69en and Céline Dessberg collaborated on the track "Hun."

hun track listing
No.	Title	Length
1.	"uurneesee chi"	6:10
2.	"gatsdaa"	3:32
3.	"gunigtai"	5:35
4.	"bodliin gunees"	3:52
5.	"hun" (featuring Céline Dessberg)	5:00
6.	"badamlyanhua"	4:42
7.	"hargui"	4:00
Total length:		33:00
