= 2017 in Mongolia =

- Decades: 1990s; 2000s; 2010s; 2020s
- See also: Other events of 2017; Timeline of Mongolian history

Events in the year 2017 in Mongolia.

== Incumbents ==
- President: Tsakhiagiin Elbegdorj (until 10 July); Khaltmaagiin Battulga (from 10 July)
- Prime Minister: Jargaltulgyn Erdenebat (until 4 October); Ukhnaagiin Khürelsükh (from 4 October)

== Events ==
- 1 January – The commissioning of Darkhan Solar Power Plant in Darkhan City, Darkhan-Uul Province.
- 21 June – The groundbreaking ceremony for the construction of Mandalgovi–Ulaanbaatar Transmission Line.
- 26 June – 2017 Mongolian presidential election.
- 25 November – The commissioning of Monnaran Solar Power Plant in Songino Khairkhan, Ulaanbaatar.

== Deaths ==
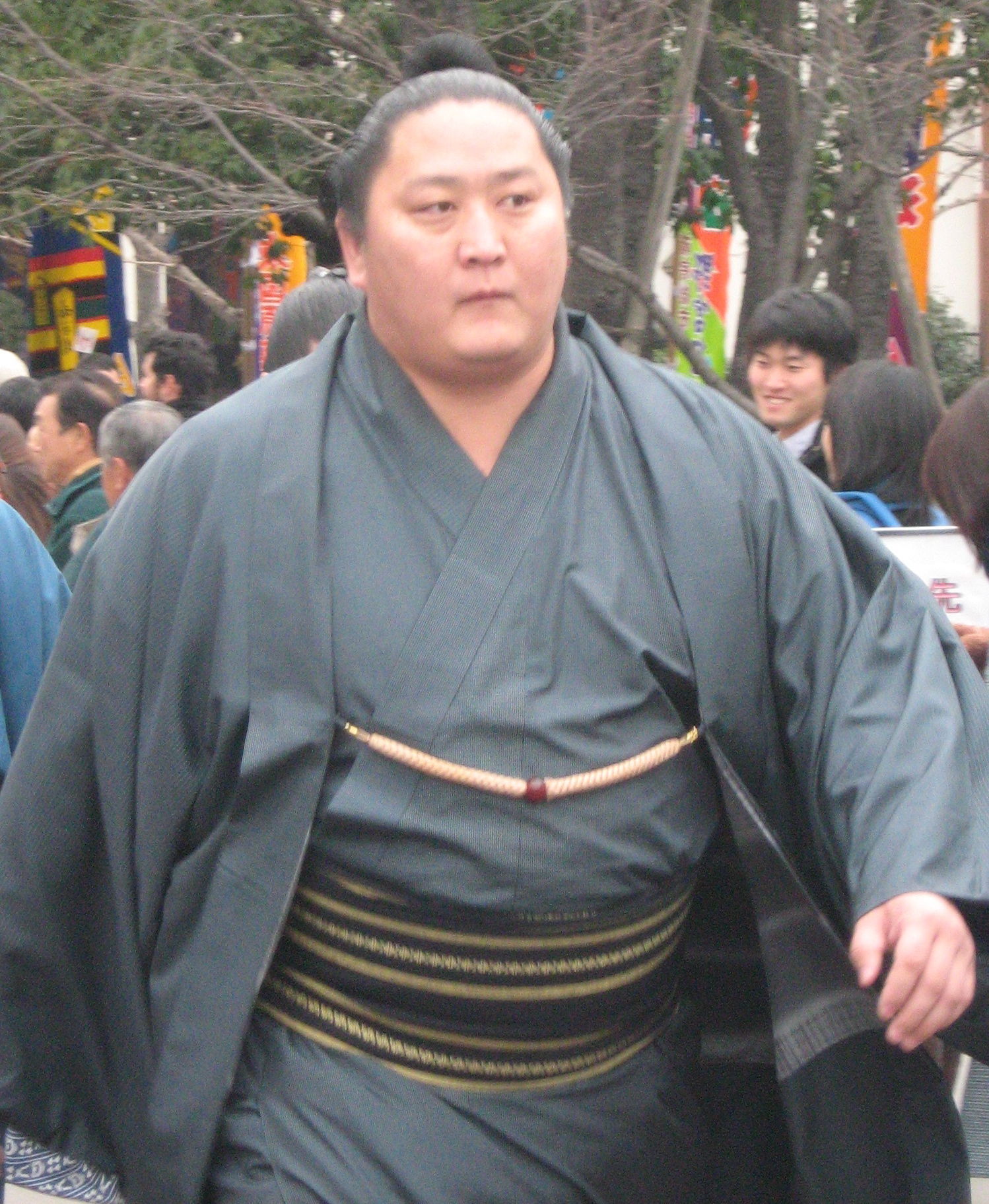
Tokitenkū Yoshiaki

- 31 January – Tokitenkū Yoshiaki, sumo wrestler (b. 1979).
