= 1972 in Mongolia =

- Decades: 1950s; 1960s; 1970s; 1980s; 1990s
- See also: Other events of 1972; Timeline of Mongolian history

Events in the year 1972 in Mongolia.

== Incumbents ==
- President: Tsagaanlamyn Dügersüren, Sonomyn Luvsan
- Prime Minister: Yumjaagiin Tsedenbal

== Events ==
- 2 April – The opening of Museum of Darkhan-Uul Province in Darkhan City.

== Births ==
- 10 March – Lakva Sim, boxer
- 28 May – Lkhamaasürengiin Badamsüren, judoka
- 28 November – Mungonzazal Janshindulam, pianist and music teacher (died 2007)
