= 1953 in Mongolia =

- Decades: 1930s; 1940s; 1950s; 1960s; 1970s
- See also: Other events of 1953; Timeline of Mongolian history

Events in the year 1953 in Mongolia.

== Incumbents ==
- Chairperson of the Presidium of the State Great Khural: Sükhbaataryn Yanjmaa (acting)
- Chairperson of the Council of Ministers: Yumjaagiin Tsedenbal

== Births ==
- 3 December – Batjargalyn Batbayar, politician

== Deaths ==
- Gonchigiin Bumtsend, politician
