= Noroviin Baatar =

Mongolian ballet dancer and actor (1936–2024)

- Норовын Баатар
- Born: 1936; Aldarkhaan soum, Zavkhan aimag, Mongolia
- Died: 25 September 2024 (aged 88); Ulaanbaatar, Mongolia
- Education: Perm State Choreographic College
- Occupations: Ballet dancer, Film actor
- Spouse: D.Purevsuren
- Writing career
- Notable awards: Honored Artist of Mongolia (1969), Lodoidamba Award (2000), Cultural Leading Worker

Noroviin Baatar or Baatar Norov (Cyrillic Mongolian: Н.Баатар; Traditional Mongolian: ᠨ ∙ ᠪᠠᠭᠠᠲᠤᠷ; 1936 – 25 September 2024) was a Mongolian ballet dancer and actor. Noroviin Baatar performed in over 60 ballets, in 21 of which he was the lead dancer. As one of Mongolia’s first professional ballet dancers, Baatar was Honored Artist of Mongolia for his contributions to the development of classical ballet. Baatar also acted in films and television commercials. He is best known for his portrayal of Erdene in Tungalag Tamir, a trilogy of historical drama films.

== Early life and education ==
In 1936, Baatar was born in Aldarkhaan District, Zavkhan aimag as the only son of the local courier and traditional healer Norov and the herdswoman Donoi of the Sartuul. After moving to Ulaanbaatar from Zavkhan with his family during his childhood, Baatar completed the only arts and dance middle school in Ulaanbaatar, Mongolia in 1950, and graduated Perm State Choreographic College in Perm, Soviet Union on a full scholarship in 1962 with distinction.

== Career ==
After completing People's Republic of Mongolia's only arts and dance middle school in 1946-1950, Baatar worked at State Musical Drama Theatre in Ulaanbaatar as a full-time dancer, and then went to Russia to pursue further education in 1959–1962. From 1963 on, Baatar worked as a professional ballet dancer at Mongolian State Academic Theatre of Opera and Ballet until 1989.

In 1977, Baatar was elected to become Deputy Member of the Mongolian Trade Union central council.

In addition to performing in Mongolia, Baatar danced in Georgia, the Soviet Union, Hungary, China, Romania, Moldavia, and Yugoslavia. At Moscow’s Bolshoi Theatre and Leningrad’s Kirov Theatre, he performed alongside renowned dancers such as People’s Artists of the Soviet Union L. Sakhyanova and N. Chistokov. Moreover, Baatar performed in famous theatres like the Stanislavski and Nemirovich-Danchenko theatres, as well as in theatres in Romania, Yugoslavia, and several other countries. In 1969 the Government of Mongolia awarded him the title of Honored Artist of Mongolia for his contributions to the development of classical ballet.

Even after his retirement in 1989, Baatar was invited to perform in ballets such as Giselle, Swan Lake and The Fountain of Bakhchisarai until the early 2010s, due to his highly regarded dancing skills.

One critic says "N. Baatar has dedicated his rich, versatile experience and talent to the development of our classical dance and ballet. He is one of the veteran artists who serves as a role model for young artists. N. Baatar dances and acts with thoughtful precision in every movement. His performance is fluid and never excessive, skillfully transitioning from one role to another with genuine emotional expression". Another critic also praises "[Baatar's] ability to enrich the fundamental movements he learned from the Perm Classical Ballet School with his inner emotions elevated him to the ranks of great dancers".

Baatar also acted in films. He played the role of Erdene, the protagonist of The Clear Tamir (Тунгалаг Тамир), a trilogy of Mongolian historical drama films (1970–73), based on the famous novel of the same name, and appeared as a Jurchen court official in Munkh Tengeriin Khuchin Dor [By the Power of Eternal Heaven], a 1992 film depicting the biography of Genghis Khan.

== Personal life and death ==
Baatar was married to People's Artist of Mongolia and singer Dashbaldangiin Purevsuren. He died in Ulaanbaatar, Mongolia on 25 September 2024, at the age of 88.

== Selected dancing performances ==
No	Year	Composers	Ballet and Performance Titles	Main Roles
1	1953	Jamyan	Our Collective	Young Haymaker
2	1956	B. Asaryev	The Fountain of Bakhchisarai	Vaclav (Lead Role)
3	1958	S. Gonchigsurnaa	Ganhuyag	Ganhuyag (Lead Role)
4	1958	F. Yarullin	Forest Spirit	Aly Batar
5	1962	B. Asafyev	The Fountain of Bakhchisarai	Khan Girey
6	1963	Rimsky-Korsakov	Scheherazade	Sindbad the Sailor
7	1964	Leo Delibes	The Girl with Blue Eyes	Czardas Dance Soloist
8	1965	A. Zorina	The Boy with the Onion	Prince Orange
9	1965	E. Choidog	The Flower Among Weeds	Fierce Eagle
10	1965	S. Gonchigsurnaa	Village Fair	Khaydar
11	1967	C. Pugni	Esmeralda	Phoebus
12	1968	E. Choidog	Eternal Friendship	Dorlig
13	1968	B. Damdinsuren	Legend of the Lake	Suren Taij
14	1969	C. Gounod	"Faust" Opera, Walpurgis Night	Bacchus, God of Wine
15	1970	S. Gonchigsurnaa	Friends	Nasan Galdan Zangi
16	1971	L. Minkus	Don Quixote	Lorenzo the Toreador
17	1971	B. Asafyev	The Flames of Paris	Basque Dance
18	1972	S. Prokofiev	Cinderella	Cinderella's Father
19	1973	B. Damdinsuren	The Hunter and the Deer	Wolf
20	1973	E. Choidog	Melody of Music	Group Dance
21	1973	J. Chuluun	Uran Khas	Nobleman, Tiger
22	1975	A. Morozov	Doctor Aybolit	Baramaley
23	1975	P.I. Tchaikovsky	Swan Lake	Rothbart
24	1977	Spanish Folk Music	Spanish Dance Collection	Elegant Young Man
25	1977	E. Choidog	Silver Crest	Demon
26	1979	A. Adam	Giselle	Duke
27	1981	Z. Khangal	Mountain of Treasures	Copper Dance
28	1982	K. Kara-Karaev	On the Path of Thunder	Herd's Soldier
29	1982	P.I. Tchaikovsky	The Nutcracker	Father
30	1984	A. Khachaturian	Spartacus	Shepherd's Dance
31	1985	D. Shostakovich	Circle of Peace	Group Dance
32	1986	A. Adam	Le Corsaire	Lord Saint
33	1987	J. Mend-Amar	Three Heads of Fate	Ceremony Official
34	1988	V. Boroldoi	Song of the Shepherds	Old Ravjikh
35	1989	L. Minkus	La Bayadère	Brahmin Priest
36	1990	P.I. Tchaikovsky	Sleeping Beauty	King
37	1990	S. Prokofiev	Romeo and Juliet	Montague

== Filmography ==
- Tungalag Tamir (1970–1973), a trilogy of historical drama films – Erdene
- Munkh Tengeriin Khuchin Dor (1992) – A Jin court official

== Honours and awards ==
- Meritorious Artist/Honored Artist of Mongolia (Монгол Улсын Гавьяат Жүжигчин, 1969)
- Lodoidamba Award (Лодойдамбын нэрэмжит шагнал, 2000)
- Cultural Leading Worker medal (Соёлын тэргүүний ажилтан)
