= 1935 in Mongolia =

- Decades: 1910s; 1920s; 1930s; 1940s; 1950s
- See also: Other events of 1935; Timeline of Mongolian history

Events in the year 1935 in Mongolia.

== Incumbents ==
- Chairperson of the Presidium of the State Little Khural: Anandyn Amar
- Chairperson of the Council of People's Commissars: Peljidiin Genden

== Births ==
- 21 December – Rinchen Barsbold, paleontologist and geologist
