= Baganuur 50 MW Battery Storage Power Station =

Battery storage power station in Baganuur, Ulaanbaatar, Mongolia

- Official name: Багануурын 50МВт хүчин чадалтай батарей хуримтлуурын станц
- Country: Mongolia
- Location: Baganuur, Ulaanbaatar
- Coordinates: 47°47′28.5″N 108°19′52.8″E
- Status: Operational
- Construction began: 15 September 2024
- Commission date: 6 December 2024
- Site area: 5 hectares

Power generation
- Nameplate capacity: 50 MW
- Storage capacity: 200 MWh

The Baganuur 50 MW Battery Storage Power Station (Mongolian: Багануурын 50МВт хүчин чадалтай батарей хуримтлуурын станц) is a battery storage power station in Baganuur, Ulaanbaatar, Mongolia.

== History ==
The contract to construct the power station was signed on 6 September 2024. Groundbreaking for the construction of the power station was held on 15 September 2024. In early December 2024, testing was done to the battery. On 6 December 2024, the power station began to supply electricity to the central system of national grid.

== Companies ==
The power station was constructed by Envision Energy general contractor company from China. The Monhorus International company of Mongolia acted as the subcontractor.

== Architecture ==
The power station sits on a site area of 5 hectares.

== Technical specifications ==
The power station has an installed generation capacity of 50 MW and storage capacity of 200 MWh. It is connected to the 220/110/35 kV Baganuur Substation on its southeastern side.

== See also ==
- List of power stations in Mongolia
