= 1937 in Mongolia =

- Decades: 1910s; 1920s; 1930s; 1940s; 1950s
- See also: Other events of 1937; Timeline of Mongolian history

Events in the year 1937 in Mongolia.

== Incumbents ==
- Chairperson of the Presidium of the State Little Khural: Dansranbilegiin Dogsom
- Chairperson of the Council of People's Commissars: Anandyn Amar

== Deaths ==
- 22 August – Gelegdorjiin Demid
- 26 November – Peljidiin Genden
