= World Financial History Museum =

Museum in Sükhbaatar, Ulaanbaatar, Mongolia

- Дэлхийн Санхүүгийн Түүхийн Музей
- Established: 23 October 2019
- Location: Sükhbaatar, Ulaanbaatar, Mongolia
- Coordinates: 47°54′57.5″N 106°55′08.7″E
- Type: museum
- Collection size: 1,000
- Founder: Ganzorig Ulziibayar

The World Financial History Museum (Mongolian: Дэлхийн Санхүүгийн Түүхийн Музей) was a museum in Sükhbaatar District, Ulaanbaatar, Mongolia. It was located on the second floor of the International Commercial Center.

The museum was founded by economist Ganzorig Ulziibayar. It was opened on 23 October 2019 after collecting all of the museum artifacts for more than 13 years. The museum exhibited more than 1,000 artifacts related to finance and economics of Mongolia.

== See also ==
- List of museums in Mongolia
