= 1965 in Mongolia =

- Decades: 1940s; 1950s; 1960s; 1970s; 1980s
- See also: Other events of 1965; Timeline of Mongolian history

Events in the year 1965 in Mongolia.

== Incumbents ==
- President: Jamsrangiin Sambuu
- Prime Minister: Yumjaagiin Tsedenbal

== Events ==
- 2 October – The commissioning of Darkhan Thermal Power Plant in Darkhan City, Selenge Province.
