= 1945 in Mongolia =

- Decades: 1920s; 1930s; 1940s; 1950s; 1960s
- See also: Other events of 1945; Timeline of Mongolian history

Events in the year 1945 in Mongolia.

== Incumbents ==
- Chairperson of the Presidium of the State Little Khural: Gonchigiin Bumtsend.
- Chairperson of the Council of Ministers: Khorloogiin Choibalsan.

== Events ==
- 28 February – The opening of Central Library of Dornogovi Province.
