= 2013 in Mongolia =

- Decades: 1990s; 2000s; 2010s; 2020s
- See also: Other events of 2013; Timeline of Mongolian history

Events in the year 2013 in Mongolia.

== Incumbents ==
- President: Tsakhiagiin Elbegdorj
- Prime Minister: Norovyn Altankhuyag

== Events ==
- 12 April – The official opening of Nalaikh Mosque in Nalaikh, Ulaanbaatar.
- 13–14 July – 2013 Judo Grand Prix Ulaanbaatar.
