= 2014 in Mongolia =

- Decades: 1990s; 2000s; 2010s; 2020s
- See also: Other events of 2014; Timeline of Mongolian history

The following lists events that happened during 2014 in Mongolia.

== Incumbents ==
- President: Tsakhiagiin Elbegdorj
- Prime Minister: Norovyn Altankhuyag (until 21 November), Chimediin Saikhanbileg (starting 21 November)

== Events ==
- 3 April – A Mongolian-flagged cargo ship sinks off the coast of South Korea, with most of the 16 North Korean crew members reported missing.
- 9–10 May – 2014 East Asian Judo Championships.
