= 1951 in Mongolia =

- Decades: 1930s; 1940s; 1950s; 1960s; 1970s
- See also: Other events of 1951; Timeline of Mongolian history

Events in the year 1951 in Mongolia.

== Incumbents ==
- Chairperson of the Presidium of the State Little Khural (until 6 July 1951): Gonchigiin Bumtsend
- Chairperson of the Presidium of the State Great Khural (from 6 July 1951): Gonchigiin Bumtsend
- Chairperson of the Council of Ministers: Khorloogiin Choibalsan

== Events ==
- 10 June – 1951 Mongolian parliamentary election.

== Births ==
- 18 January – Khajidsuren Bolormaa, first lady
