= 1955 in Mongolia =

- Decades: 1930s; 1940s; 1950s; 1960s; 1970s
- See also: Other events of 1955; Timeline of Mongolian history

Events in the year 1955 in Mongolia.

== Incumbents ==
- Chairperson of the Presidium of the State Great Khural: Jamsrangiin Sambuu
- Chairperson of the Council of Ministers: Yumjaagiin Tsedenbal

== Events ==
- 16 August – The establishment of Mongolian State Honor Guard.
