= 1946 in Mongolia =

- Decades: 1920s; 1930s; 1940s; 1950s; 1960s
- See also: Other events of 1946; Timeline of Mongolian history

Events in the year 1946 in Mongolia.

== Incumbents ==
- Chairperson of the Presidium of the State Little Khural: Gonchigiin Bumtsend
- Chairperson of the Council of Ministers: Khorloogiin Choibalsan

== Events ==
- 5 January - The Nationalist government of China based in Chungking recognised the independence of Mongolia.
- 13/14 February - Mongolia and China agree to establish diplomatic relations.
- 27 February – The opening of Central Library of Dornod Province.
- 27 February - Mongolia and the Soviet Union signed a new Treaty of Friendship and Mutual Assistance.
- 24 June - Mongolia applies to join the United Nations Mongolia became a member of the United Nations on 27 October 1961.
