= 1992 in Mongolia =

- Decades: 1970s; 1980s; 1990s; 2000s; 2010s
- See also: Other events of 1992; Timeline of Mongolian history

Events in the year 1992 in Mongolia.

== Incumbents ==
- President: Punsalmaagiin Ochirbat
- Prime Minister: Dashiin Byambasüren (until 21 July 1992), Puntsagiin Jasrai (from 21 July 1992)

== Events ==
- 13 January – Ulaanbaatar was reorganized from six districts to nine districts.
- 28 June – 1992 Mongolian parliamentary election.
