= Ulaanbaatar Securities Exchange =

Stock exchange in Ulaanbaatar, Mongolia

Ulaanbaatar Securities Exchange (UBX) was established on May 1, 2015. UBX has acquired trading and clearing licenses from Financial Regulatory Commission in the same year. In 2017, the first listed company offered its shares to the general public, but also during 2018-2021, bonds are traded successfully. As of the first half of 2021, the Exchange conducted a total of 857 transactions and traded shares and bonds worth 2,319,610,430 MNT.

As of the first half of 2021, the Exchange has 17 member securities companies, five clearing members, and two market makers. Out of the five clearing members, two general members are responsible for payment and settlement activities of their contracted securities companies and the Exchange's trading members. In the future, the Exchange intends to introduce products and services that have met international securities market standards, and aspires to become the leading digital securities exchange in Mongolia. UBX's vision is to make Ulaanbaatar and Mongolia the regional financial and capital market center.
