= E-Mongolia =

Mongolian e-governance platform

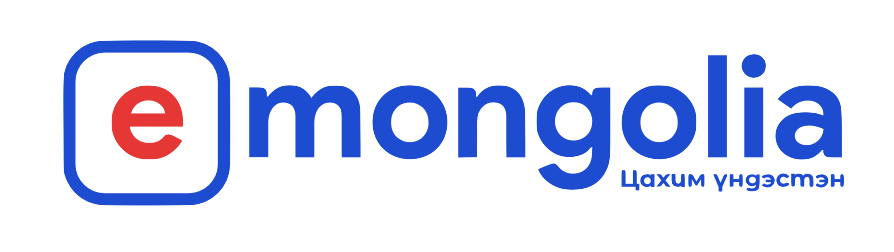

Digital Platform overview
- Formed: 2 October 2020
- Jurisdiction: Government of Mongolia
- Website: e-mongolia.mn/start/

E-Mongolia is a digital platform introduced by the Government of Mongolia to improve access to public services. Launched in October 2020, the e-governance platform allows citizens to access government services online.

== Overview ==
The e-Mongolia platform and associated app was launched with the aim of streamlining public service delivery, reducing bureaucracy and decreasing duplication of effort between government organizations. By May 2024, the platform offered over 1.8 million active users 1,200 services for 86 organizations. E-Mongolia 3.0 was introduced in May 2023 to increase accessibility for individuals with disabilities, simplify business registration processes, and incorporate notary services. In May 2024, the platform updated to version 4.0 to utilise AI-based smart features.

== Initiatives ==
=== E-Mongolia Academy ===
In August 2021, the Mongolian Cabinet approved the establishment of e-Mongolia Academy under the Communication and Information Technology Authority to advance artificial intelligence development, innovation trials, and digital literacy training for public servants and citizens. In July 2023, What3Words announced a partnership with the e-Mongolia Academy to incorporate their technology into the e-Mongolia platform with the aim of enhancing emergency response and incident reporting capabilities for citizens and local councils.

=== E-Business ===
The e-Mongolia Academy also worked to further the e-Mongolia app, by developing the associated e-Business platform, which was launched by the Government in April 2023. E-Business aims to expedite the process of establishing a business in Mongolia. As of April 2024, over 6,000 businesses had been created via the platform, providing over 118,000 services to users.

== See also ==
- Government of Mongolia
- Chinggis Fund
