= 1990 in Mongolia =

- Decades: 1970s; 1980s; 1990s; 2000s; 2010s
- See also: Other events of 1990; Timeline of Mongolian history

Events in the year 1990 in Mongolia.

== Incumbents ==
- General Secretary of the Mongolian People's Revolutionary Party: Jambyn Batmönkh (until 14 March), Gombojavyn Ochirbat (from 14 March)
- Chairman of the Presidium of the State Great Khural: Jambyn Batmönkh (until 21 March), Punsalmaagiin Ochirbat (21 March–3 September)
- President: Punsalmaagiin Ochirbat (from 3 September)
- Prime Minister: Dumaagiin Sodnom (until 21 March), Sharavyn Gungaadorj (21 March–11 September), Dashiin Byambasüren (from 11 September)

== Events ==
- 7 March – The Mongolian Democratic Union launched a hunger strike in order for the communists to resign.
- 9 March – Batmönkh dissolves the MPRP politburo.
- 22–29 June – 1990 Mongolian parliamentary election: The MPRP won 357 seats in the Great Khural and 31 of 53 seats in the Small Khural.

== Births ==
- 19 September – Dashtserengiin Saintsetseg, swimmer
