= Independence Day (Mongolia) =

State holiday in Mongolia

- Official name: Үндэсний эрх чөлөө, тусгаар тогтнолоо сэргээсний баярын өдөр (Tusgaar Togtnoliin Üdür)
- Observed by: Mongolia
- Type: National day
- Significance: Date of independence from the Qing dynasty in 1911
- Celebrations: Fireworks, concerts, parades
- Date: 29 December
- Frequency: Annual

The Independence Day of Mongolia (Mongolian: Үндэсний эрх чөлөө, тусгаар тогтнолоо сэргээсний баярын өдөр) is the main state holiday in Mongolia. This date is celebrated annually on 29 December. It marks Mongolia's independence from Manchu-led Qing dynasty in 1911. It has been celebrated annually in Mongolia since 2011. Independence Day is sometimes wrongly used as the term used for Republic Day on November 26.

On December 29, 1911, the ninth day of the winter solstice of the year of the Pig, the Mongolian people declared their independence during the Mongolian Revolution of 1911, ending the 200-year rule of the Manchu Qing Dynasty in Mongolia. They proclaimed the VIII Bogd Khan as the supreme ruler of the state and religion of Mongolia, presented him with the state seal, state flag, honors, and made a historic decision to establish a government with five ministries, thus establishing the independent Bogd Khanate of Mongolia. The 1911 National Revolution of Independence, which marked the beginning of the Mongolian people's independence from Manchu’s Qing Dynasty, is a special page in the history of the Mongolian people with an ancient tradition of statehood, and a historical event that future generations should remember with pride. This National Independence Revolution was the embodiment of the Mongolian people's decades-long unyielding desire and persistent struggle to restore their independent state, the beginning of the great revival of national consciousness, and the actual grounds and basis for the People's Revolution of Mongolia.

Although the value of this historically important day was ignored during the socialist years, the Parliament's law on August 16, 2007, established December 29 as a public holiday, and then the law on December 23, 2011 established it as a public holiday, the Day of Restoration of National Freedom and Independence. The country is on a public holiday on this day.

== Background ==
In 1911, the Xinhai Revolution broke out and most of Mongols declared its independence from the Qing Empire on December 29, 1911. The newly established Bogd Khanate of Mongolia led by the Bogd Khan lasted for 8 years until it was occupied by the Republic of China in 1919, but Mongolia led by the communist regained its independence on 11 July 1921.

== See also ==
- Mongolia under Qing rule
- Public holidays in Mongolia
- Mongolian State Flag Day
