= Luvsannamsrain Oyun-Erdene =

Prime Minister of Mongolia from 2021 to 2025

- Лувсаннамсрайн Оюун-Эрдэнэ
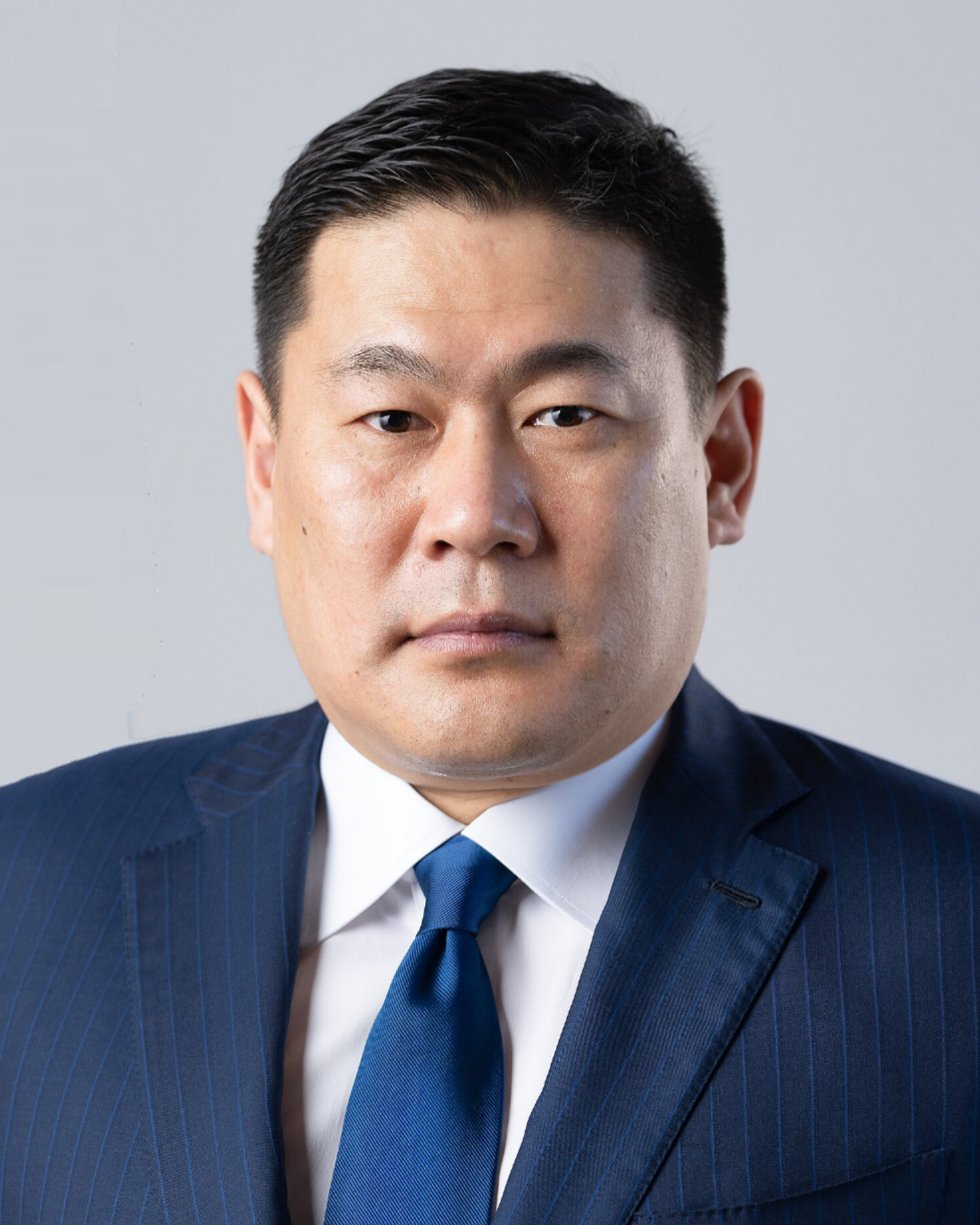
- Official portrait, 2021

Prime Minister of Mongolia
- In office 27 January 2021 – 13 June 2025
- President: Khaltmaagiin Battulga; Ukhnaagiin Khürelsükh
- Deputy: Sainbuyan Amarsaikhan; Chimediin Khürelbaatar; Togmidyn Dorjkhand
- Preceded by: Ukhnaagiin Khürelsükh
- Succeeded by: Gombojavyn Zandanshatar

Chairman of the Mongolian People's Party
- In office 25 June 2021 – 15 November 2025
- Preceded by: Ukhnaagiin Khürelsükh
- Succeeded by: Nyam-Osoryn Uchral

Chief Cabinet Secretary of Mongolia
- In office 2 February 2019 – 27 January 2021
- Prime Minister: Ukhnaagiin Khürelsükh
- Preceded by: Gombojavyn Zandanshatar
- Succeeded by: Tsendiin Nyamdorj

Member of the State Great Khural
- Incumbent
- Assumed office 5 July 2016
- Constituency: 6th, Dornod, Khentii, Sükhbaatar Province (2024–2028); 18th, Khentii Province (2020–2024); 41st, Khentii Province (2016–2020)

President of the Social Democracy Mongolian Youth Union
- In office September 2010 – 21 June 2015
- Chairman: Sükhbaataryn Batbold; Ölziisaikhany Enkhtüvshin
- Preceded by: Gombojavyn Zandanshatar
- Succeeded by: Ganzorigiin Temüülen

Personal details
- Born: 29 June 1980 (age 46) Ulaanbaatar, Mongolia
- Party: Mongolian People's Party
- Spouse: Boldyn Tuul
- Children: 3
- Education: Bers Institute (BA); National University of Mongolia (BA); Mongolian National University of Education (MA); Harvard Kennedy School (MA)
- Website: www.oyunerdene.mn

Luvsannamsrain Oyun-Erdene (Note: Mongolian: Лувсаннамсрайн Оюун-Эрдэнэ, romanized: Lubhsannamsrain Oyuun-Erdene, IPA: [ˌɮʊwsăɴnamsˈrɛe̯ɴ ɔˈjʊɴ‿ertĕn]) (born 29 June 1980) is a Mongolian politician who served as the 32nd and 33rd prime minister of Mongolia from 2021 to 2025. He was elected to the State Great Khural (Parliament) three times from 2016 to 2025. After losing a vote of no confidence amid the 2025 Mongolian protests, Oyun-Erdene resigned on 3 June and served as a caretaker until his successor, Gombojavyn Zandanshatar, was appointed on 13 June 2025.

The State Great Khural re-appointed Oyun-Erdene as the prime minister of Mongolia on 5 July 2024, following the Mongolian People's Party (MPP)'s third-term election victory in the 2024 parliamentary election. Although the MPP secured a parliamentary majority, Oyun-Erdene chose to form a "grand coalition" government with the opposition parties.

As Prime Minister, Oyun-Erdene launched the New Recovery Policy following the COVID-19 pandemic, as part of Mongolia's Vision 2050 development plan. He also introduced E-Mongolia, a digital government platform, and constitutional amendments to expand parliament and adopt a mixed-member proportional system.

Before becoming prime minister, Oyun-Erdene was a Minister and Chief of the Cabinet Secretariat of the government of Mongolia from 2 February 2019 to 27 January 2021.

== Education and early career ==
Oyun-Erdene graduated from Harvard University's Kennedy School of Government with a Mid-Career Master in Public Administration degree in 2015.

In 2016, he was elected as a Member of Parliament in Mongolia for Khentii. He led multiple demonstrations, most notably one held in 2018 involving more than 30,000 citizens against government corruption.

== Chief of the Cabinet Secretariat of Mongolia ==
As Chief of the Cabinet Secretariat of Mongolia in 2019, Oyun-Erdene assisted in amending the Constitution of Mongolia. The 2019 amendments strengthened the powers of the Prime Minister.

During his time in this role, Oyun-Erdene drafted plans for a 5-year program to expand Mongolia's digital infrastructure. The first action of this program was rolling-out E-Mongolia, an online platform which provides 182 different services to citizens.

== Prime Minister of Mongolia ==
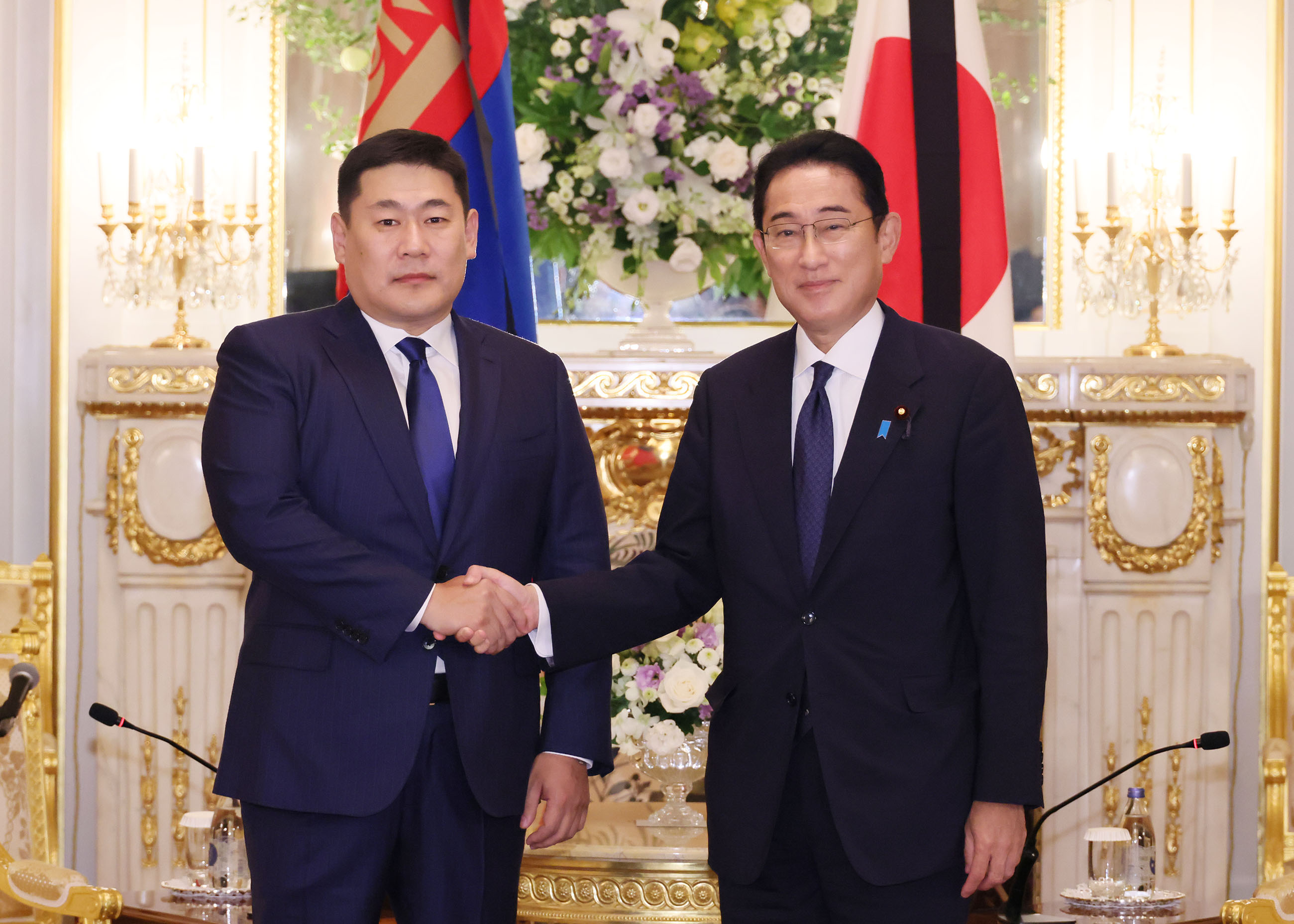
Luvsannamsrain Oyun-Erdene and Japanese Prime Minister Fumio Kishida on 28 September 2022

Luvsannamsrain Oyun-Erdene was appointed Prime Minister of Mongolia on 27 January 2021. He reshuffled his cabinet and appointed new ministers on 30 August 2022. Prime Minister Oyun-Erdene's priorities as prime minister include increasing Mongolia's energy independence, expanding Mongolia's links with the rest of the world, supporting the long-term expansion of the Mongolian economy, reforming government and tackling corruption. He was re-appointed as the Prime Minister on 5 July 2024, following his party's third-term win in the 2024 elections.

=== Vision 2050 and New Recovery Policy ===
In December 2021, Oyun-Erdene introduced the New Recovery Policy (or New Revival Policy) as part of Mongolia's Vision 2050 program, focused on diversifying Mongolia's economy, supporting the country's recovery from the COVID-19 pandemic and driving long-term development. The policy contains six pillars with each aimed at tackling existing economic constraints and unlocking growth in the following areas: border ports, energy, industrialization, urban and rural development, green development and state efficiency.

Partially as a result of the New Recovery Policy beginning to be implemented, the country's economy grew by 4% in 2022, having been forecasted to grow by just 2.6%. The Mongolian budget deficit was reduced by 60%, with exports increasing. In December 2022, the Government announced that Mongolia had paid off the US$1.5 billion 'Chinggis bond', a key milestone in the country's long-term debt management strategy. In 2023, the European Bank for Reconstruction and Development forecasted that Mongolia's economy would see 7.2% growth in 2023 and 7.5% in 2024.

Under the New Recovery Policy, Mongolia has already built the Zuunbayan-Khangi rail link, which opened in November 2022, and started construction on the New Settlement Zone of Khushigt Valley. Other New Recovery Policy Projects completed in 2022 include the Borkh solar thermal power plant charge storage system in Uliastgai and the solar thermal power plant hybrid system in Altai soum.

In February 2025, Oyun-Erdene also announced an agreement to construct the Gashuunsukhait-Gantsmod railway crossing, which had previously been subject to significant negotiation delays. This crossing is expected to increase Mongolia's coal export capacity by 30 million tons.

=== Tourism ===
On 29 November 2022, the Government of Mongolia unveiled a major package of measures to promote the country as a growing tourist destination. This included the Government launch of its 'Welcome to Mongolia' campaign, as well as designating 2023–2025 as the 'Years to Visit Mongolia'. The aim of the campaign is to encourage overseas travelers to visit Mongolia for both leisure and tourism. The Government's reforms are focused on opening up more travel routes, modernizing Mongolia's visa system and reducing the cost of flights to the country. In June 2022, Mongolia started allowing South Koreans to enter and stay without a visa for up to 90 days. In January 2023, nationals of 34 countries became exempt from visa requirements for those traveling to Mongolia for tourism purposes. In August 2023, during Oyun-Erdene's visit to the United States, the Prime Minister met with Vice President Kamala Harris and held a joint press conference. During the visit, it was announced that there would be direct flights between the US and Mongolia starting in 2024.

=== Digitalization policy ===
In December 2022, Oyun-Erdene's government launched its new online procurement portal, Mindgolia, to boost the country's tech sector and to transition the country's economy "from mining to mind." The website allows companies to search for products by software category, view reviews, and choose products and services by looking at other people's ratings of them. In April 2023, Oyun-Erdene launched the E-Business online platform to help businesses start and grow more easily, cutting down on bureaucracy and waiting times by streamlining exchanges between government and business. At the Mongolia Economic Forum in July 2023, the Government announced an agreement with SpaceX and Starlink to launch a new era of high-speed internet connectivity. Mongolia now has two licences for SpaceX to operate as an internet provider in Mongolia using low-orbit satellites. In August 2023, during Oyun-Erdene's official visit to the United States, it was announced that Google would be partnering with Mongolia to enhance the digital skills of Mongolian teachers and young people, including the provision of 20,000 Chromebooks to schools.

=== Mining ===
On 13 March 2023, the Prime Minister joined Rio Tinto CEO Jakob Stausholm 1.3 kilometres (0.81 mi) underground to celebrate the commencement of underground production at the Oyu Tolgoi copper mine in the Gobi Desert. A partnership between Rio Tinto and Mongolia, the Oyu Tolgoi open pit and concentrator have been operating since 2011. The workforce of Oyu Tolgoi is currently around 20,000 people, of which 97% are Mongolian. Oyu Tolgoi works with more than 500 national suppliers and has spent around $15 billion in Mongolia since 2010, including $4 billion of taxes, fees and other payments to the state budget. According to Rio Tinto, Oyu Tolgoi is expected to produce an average of 500,000 tons of copper per year from 2028 to 2036 from the open pit and underground, which would be enough to produce around 6 million electric vehicles per year, and an average of close to 290,000 tons over the reserve life of around 30 years.

Speaking at the commencement ceremony, the Prime Minister said "I am proud to celebrate this major milestone with our partner Rio Tinto as we look towards Mongolia becoming one of the world's key copper producers. The start of underground production at Oyu Tolgoi demonstrates our ability to work together with investors in a sustainable manner and become a trusted partner. The next phase of the partnership will enable the continued successful delivery of Mongolia's 'New Recovery Policy' and Vision 2050 economic diversification strategy. Mongolia stands ready to work actively and mutually beneficially with global investors and partners."

In December 2024, Oyun-Erdene announced a $1.6 billion uranium mining agreement with French company Orano, which was ratified by Parliament in January. Production is expected to start in 2028, with peak output projected to reach 2,600 metric tonnes of uranium by 2044.

Under Prime Minister Oyun-Erdene's initiative the new Natural Wealth Fund was established in 2024. It intends to channel natural resource revenues into investments that could help Mongolia diversify away from its mining sector dependence.

=== Anti-corruption ===
Oyun-Erdene cultivated a reputation as a reform-minded leader seeking to challenge entrenched interests in the mining and banking sectors.

During the December 2022 Mongolian protests, thousands protested in Mongolia's capital against alleged corruption in Mongolia's coal industry and inflation. As part of the New Recovery Policy's pillar to tackle corruption and in light of these protests, the Prime Minister put forward an initiative to change the governance of Erdenes Tavan Tolgoi JSC (ETT), making the company public. This was aimed at improving transparency within the mining sector. The Prime Minister also set up a six-month investigation into ETT. In January 2023, Mongolia took further steps to crack down on corruption by passing the Commodities Exchange Law, which requires state-owned enterprises to trade export commodities on a new mining commodity exchange.

In January 2023, Mongolia's anti-corruption authority announced that over 30 officials, including the chief executive of Erdenes Tavan Tolgoi, were under investigation for embezzlement. In May, the Mongolian Parliament passed constitutional amendments to enlarge the legislative body, from 76 members to 126, and adopt a more proportional electoral system for the 2024 elections. Oyun-Erdene stated that the proportional system would prevent the government being used for private gain. In July 2023, Mongolia became the first Asia–Pacific country to implement all 40 recommendations from the Financial Action Task Force, and the fifth globally.

=== Foreign affairs ===
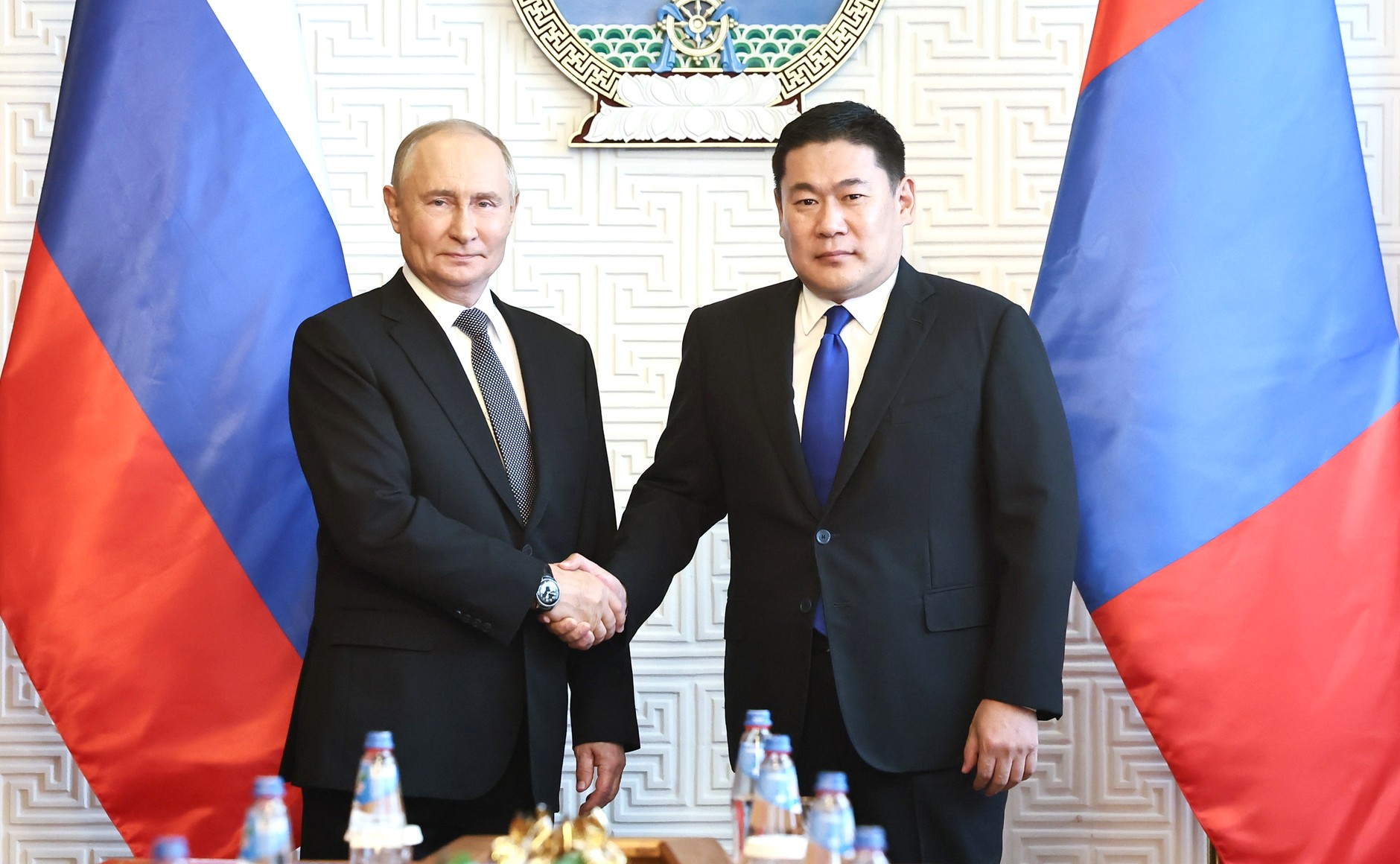
Oyun-Erdene with Russian President Vladimir Putin in Ulaanbaatar on 3 September 2024

In 2023, Prime Minister Oyun-Erdene visited the White House and met with then-Vice-president Kamala Harris.

In January 2024, Mongolia stated that it seeks to institute a summit where Mongolia, China, and Russia can further develop economic opportunities, including the China-Mongolia-Russia Economic Corridor, one of the six major land corridors of the Belt and Road Initiative. That same month, Oyun-Erdene described relations between Mongolia and China as at their highest level and described the two countries as working towards a comprehensive strategic partnership.

=== 2025 protests and resignation ===
Public frustration was sparked by social media posts made by the fiancée of Temüülen Oyun-Erdene, the Prime Minister's 23-year-old son, which featured luxury handbags, a high-end ring, and a Mercedes-Benz. The images prompted allegations that the Oyun-Erdene's family was benefiting from wealth far exceeding the means of a civil servant, intensifying long-standing concerns over corruption and the concentration of wealth in Mongolia's resource-rich economy. A petition demanding his resignation gathered over 59,000 signatures. Oyun-Erdene submitted himself to an investigation by the Independent Authority Against Corruption but made few public statements regarding the controversy.

Small but sustained protests began in mid-May 2025, with young Mongolians gathering at Sükhbaatar Square, in Ulaanbaatar, to call for the prime minister's resignation. Demonstrators expressed frustration over allegations of corruption, alongside broader grievances related to inequality and government corruption. They demanded that Oyun-Erdene publicly disclose his sources of income and provide an explanation for the funding of the reported expenses. On 21 May, the Mongolian People's Party expelled the Democratic Party from the ruling coalition, citing its members' public support for the demonstrations, effectively dissolving the coalition government less than a year after its formation.

Oyun-Erdene resigned on 3 June after losing a vote of no confidence in a secret ballot, with 44 State Great Khural members supporting him out of the required 64. Thirty-six opposed him, while the remaining 42 did not vote. He remained in office as a caretaker until a new prime minister was appointed on 13 June 2025.

== Notes ==
Political offices
Preceded by Ukhnaagiin Khürelsükh	Prime Minister of Mongolia; 2021–2025	Succeeded by Gombojavyn Zandanshatar
