= First Lady of Mongolia =

- Монгол Улсын Тэргүүн хатагтай
- Incumbent; Luvsandorjiin Bolortsetseg since 25 June 2021
- Style: First lady
- Residence: President's Resident at Ikh Tenger Complex
- Inaugural holder: B. Gündegmaa (1939); Sharavyn Tsevelmaa (1990)
- Website: First Lady of Mongolia

The first lady of Mongolia (Mongolian: Монгол Улсын Тэргүүн хатагтай, romanized: Mongol Ulsiin Terguun khatagtai) refers to the wife of the president of Mongolia, the country's executive head of state.

== First ladies of the Mongolian People's Republic (1923-1990) ==
| No. | Picture | Name | Term begins | Term ends | Leader | Notes |
|---|---|---|---|---|---|---|
| 1 | | B. Gündegmaa | 24 March 1939 | 26 January 1952 | Khorloogiin Choibalsan m. 1935 | |
| 2 | | Anastasia Filatova (1920–2001) | 26 January 1952 | 24 August 1984 | Yumjaagiin Tsedenbal m. 1947 | |
| 3 | | Avirmediin Daariimaa (1932–2022) | 24 August 1984 | 14 March 1990 | Jambyn Batmönkh m. 1954 | |

== First ladies of Mongolia (since 1990) ==
| No. | Picture | Name | Tenure | President | Notes |
|---|---|---|---|---|---|
| 1 | | Sharavyn Tsevelmaa | 1 September 1990 – 20 June 1997 | Punsalmaagiin Ochirbat m. 1965 | Wife of the first democratically elected President of Mongolia. |
| 2 | | Azadsurengiin Oyunbileg | 20 June 1997 – 24 June 2005 | Natsagiin Bagabandi m. ? | |
| 3 | | Onongiin Tsolmon | 24 June 2005 – 18 June 2009 | Nambaryn Enkhbayar m. 1987 | |
| 4 | | Khajidsurengiin Bolormaa | 18 June 2009 – 10 July 2017 | Tsakhiagiin Elbegdorj m. 1980s | |
| – | None | | 10 July 2017 – 25 June 2021 | Khaltmaagiin Battulga | President Khaltmaagiin Battulga is unmarried |
| 5 | | Luvsandorjiin Bolortsetseg | 25 June 2021 – present | Ukhnaagiin Khürelsükh m. 1990s | |

== See also ==
- First lady
- President of Mongolia
- List of presidents of Mongolia
