= Capital punishment in Mongolia =

Capital punishment has been abolished in Mongolia since 2016, following a previous eight-year moratorium.

== Historical use ==
At the time of abolition, five crimes on Mongolian statute books were punishable by the death penalty: "terrorist acts committed for political purposes; terrorist acts against representatives of a foreign State for political purposes; sabotage; premeditated murder committed with aggravating circumstances; and rape with aggravating circumstances". Only men aged 18–60 at the time of the crime could be executed; women were not subject to the death penalty. The government has since abolished the death penalty for all crimes.

According to Amnesty International, Mongolia, like China, Vietnam, Malaysia and Singapore, practiced executions in secrecy. The family of the prisoner would not be informed of the date of the execution, nor the place of burial. There were 45 people sentenced to death in 2007, but the number of executions was not revealed by the authorities. Five people are thought to have been executed in 2008.

== Methods ==
Immurement was a historical method still used in the beginning of the 20th century in Mongolia. The modern method of execution was a bullet to the neck.

== Moratorium ==
In June 2009, Tsakhiagiin Elbegdorj, an abolitionist, was elected President of Mongolia. He began using his prerogative of pardon to prevent the application of the death penalty.

On January 14, 2010, he announced that he would henceforth use his prerogative to pardon all persons sentenced to death. He stated that most countries in the world had abolished the death penalty, and that Mongolia should follow their example; he suggested that capital punishment be replaced with a 30-year prison sentence. The decision was controversial; when Elbegdorj announced it in Parliament, a significant number of representatives chose not to give the applause customarily due after a presidential speech.

Le Monde, however, noted that President Elbegdorj "may find it a lot more difficult" to have the death penalty abolished in law, adding that it might be applied again if Elbegdorj failed to be reelected. Elbegdorj won the 2013 presidential election on 26 June 2013 and was in office until succeeded on 10 July 2017 by Khaltmaagiin Battulga, who has sought to reintroduce the death penalty to Mongolia.

== Abolition ==
On January 5, 2012, "a large majority of MPs" adopted a bill that aims to abolish the death penalty. After two years under the official moratorium, the State Great Khural formally signed the Second Optional Protocol to the International Covenant on Civil and Political Rights. This makes Mongolia abolitionist because under Article 1, paragraphs 1 and 2, of the Covenant, “No one within the jurisdiction of a State Party to the present Protocol shall be executed,” and “Each State Party shall take all necessary measures to abolish the death penalty within its jurisdiction.”

Capital punishment was formally removed from statutes by a 2015 Act, which took effect on July 1, 2016. Mongolia is one of the last Eastern Bloc states to abolish the death penalty.

== Proposed reinstatement ==
On October 16, 2017, the newly elected president Khaltmaagiin Battulga announced that he had created an expert group to reinstate the death penalty for premeditated murder committed with aggravating circumstances and rape with aggravating circumstances. In late November, he forwarded his proposal to the ministry of justice and internal affairs. On April 2, 2018, presidential staff announced that the president would hand in a proposal to this effect to the parliament during April.
