= Khajidsuren Bolormaa =

Mongolian mineralogist

Khajidsuren Bolormaa Хажидсүрэн Болормаа
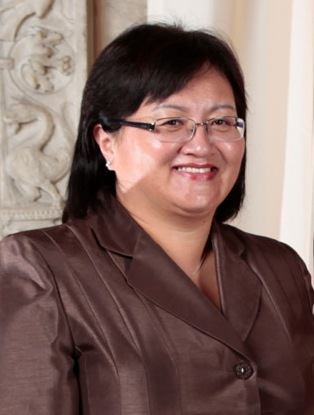

First Lady of Mongolia
- In role June 18, 2009 – July 10, 2017
- President: Tsakhiagiin Elbegdorj
- Preceded by: Onongiin Tsolmon

Personal details
- Born: January 18, 1965 (age 60); Ulaanbaatar, Mongolia
- Spouse: Tsakhiagiin Elbegdorj
- Children: 4 Sons

Khajidsuren Bolormaa, or Khajidsurengiin Bolormaa, (Mongolian: Хажидсүрэнгийн Болормаа; born January 18, 1965) is a Mongolian mineralogical engineer, as well as a healthcare and children's rights advocate, who served as the First Lady of Mongolia from 2009 to 2017. Bolormaa is the wife of former President Tsakhiagiin Elbegdorj. In 2006, Bolormaa founded the Bolor Foundation, which cares for orphans in Mongolia.

== Biography ==
Bolormaa was born on January 18, 1965, in Ulaanbaatar, Mongolia. She graduated high school in Mongolia. She then enrolled at Lviv State University in Lviv, Ukrainian S.S.R. (present-day Ukraine), from 1983 to 1988 to study geochemistry. Bolormaa met her future husband, Tsakhiagiin Elbegdorj, while both were students living in Lviv. The couple married and had their first son, who was born in Lviv. They returned to Mongolia in 1988.

Khajidsurengiin Bolormaa worked as a mineralogical engineer for the government-run Central Geological Laboratory of Mongolia. She then established and opened Ankh-Erdene, a private research laboratory focusing on mineralogy and the Mongolia's mining industry.

Tsakhiagiin Elbegdorj was elected president in 2009, making Bolormaa the First Lady of Mongolia. Elbegdorj was re-elected in 2013.

In March 2010, First Lady Bolormaa established the Hope Cancer-free Mongolia National Foundation to improve cancer treatment services in the country. She called for increased cooperation between 38 Asian First Ladies to fight cancer on the continent, especially among women. The foundation retrained Mongolian doctors, nurses and other staff at both domestic and international medical facilities between 2010 and 2013.
