= Fradkin =

Fradkin (Russian: Фрадкин) is a Yiddish family name. It may refer to one of the following persons:

- Barbara Fradkin, Canadian writer
- Eduardo Fradkin (born 1950), Argentinian-American physicist
- Efim Fradkin (1924–1999), Soviet/Russian physicist
- Judith Fradkin, American physician-scientist
- Les Fradkin (born 1951), American musician
- Lucy Fradkin (born 1953), American artist
- Mark Fradkin (1914–1990), Soviet composer
- Philip L. Fradkin (1935–2012), American environmentalist
- Shneur Zalman Fradkin (1830–1902), Chabad rabbi

== See also ==
- Fradkin Brothers Furniture, furniture retailer in Baltimore County, Maryland
