= Ulaanbaatar Hotel =

Hotel in Sükhbaatar, Ulaanbaatar, Mongolia

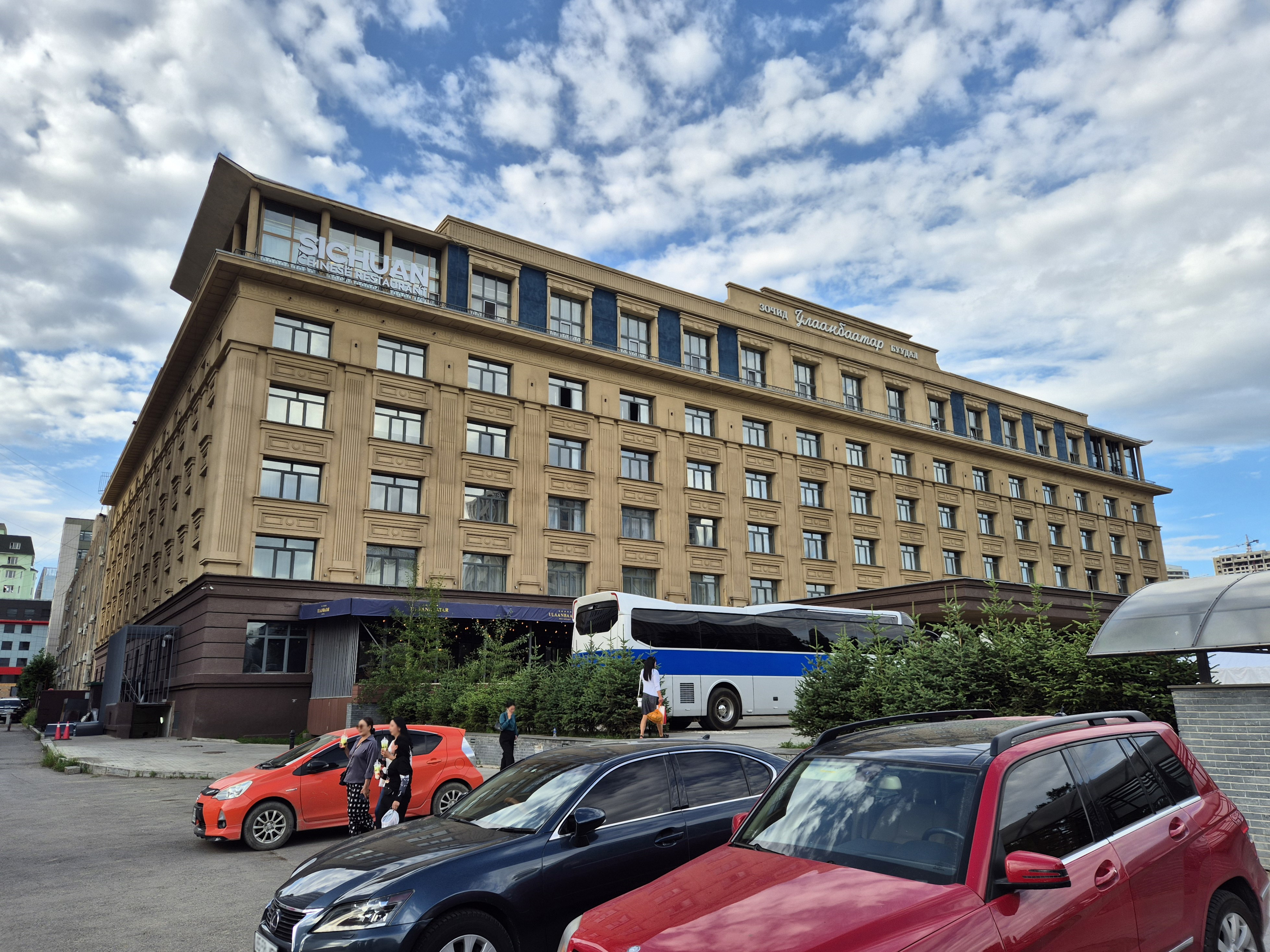

- Location in Mongolia

General information
- Location: Sükhbaatar, Ulaanbaatar, Mongolia
- Coordinates: 47°55′7″N 106°55′22″E
- Opening: 1961

Website
- http://www.ubhotel.com/

The Ulaanbaatar Hotel (Mongolian: Улаанбаатар Зочид Буудал) is the first ever hotel built in Mongolia, built in 1961. It was founded by Yumjaagiin Tsedenbal and operates now as a stock company. From 1991 the company has restructured as a pioneer Joint Stock Company in Mongolia.

The hotel became the first five-star hotel in Mongolia. As of 2010 Ulaanbaatar Hotel has broadened its operation with UB-2 and Ar Huvch, which are located in Gorkhi-Terelj National Park.

The infamous Anastasia Filatova, the wife of Mongolian communist leader Yumjaagiin Tsedenbal, and de facto co-ruler of the country, was personally involved in the construction and design. She chose the best workers and designers available at the time to complete the hotel, which was designed to be a flagship property for the Mongolian hospitality industry. The senior employees say that she had personally picked colors and design for the lobby and main hall.

It was the first public building with running hot water, in the 1960s Mongolian elites used to rent rooms per hour to enjoy the hot bath or shower. A number of foreign embassies were quartered at the hotel during 1980s and 1990s.

The last embassy, Turkish mission, moved out in 1997. Ever since its foundation the hotel is frequented by politicians and lobbyists. During the Democratic revolution of 1991, Communist rulers used the hotel to meet unofficially with the democratic activists. The future fate of the country was decided during these meetings. The hotel has also become a cultural phenomenon: more than a dozen movies were filmed here.

Julia Roberts, Demis Roussos, Richard Gere, Steven Seagal, Dalai Lama, Fradkov, Andre Kim, and Alsou are among the famous guests who stayed at the hotel.
