= Anastasia Filatova =

First Lady of Mongolia from 1952 to 1984

- Анастасия Филaтова

First Lady of the Mongolian People's Republic
- In office 26 January 1952 – 24 August 1984
- Preceded by: B.Gundegmaa
- Succeeded by: Avirmediin Daariimaa

Personal details
- Born: 4 February 1920 Sapozhok, Ryazan, Russian SFSR
- Died: 21 October 2001 (aged 81) Moscow, Russia
- Party: Mongolian People's Party
- Spouse: Yumjaagiin Tsedenbal
- Children: Vladislav; Zorig

Anastasia Ivanovna Filatova (Russian: Анастаси́я Ива́новна Фила́това, Mongolian: Анастасиа Ивановна Филатова-Цэдэнбал, 4 February 1920 – 21 October 2001) was a Russian wife of the Mongolian leader Yumjaagiin Tsedenbal.

== Early life ==
Filatova was born in Sapozhok in Ryazan Oblast into a family of five. Soon after leaving school, she moved to Moscow, where she became a Komsomol organizer within the Ministry of Trade. In 1941, she had a fiancé, who served in the Red Army at the front. After they separated in 1943, she met Tsedenbal while he was visiting.

== First Lady ==
In Mongolia, she was first received with caution as many considered her to be a kind of Soviet overseer, keeping an eye on Mongolian politicians. Her marriage to the leader of Mongolia was in itself considered a conduit of the influence of Nikolai Vazhnov (Soviet ambassador) and with the blessing of the Premier Khorloogiin Choibalsan.

Keeping a low profile in the 1950s and the 1960s, Filatova aspired to a political role of her own in her later years. She relied on the authority of her husband to subtly influence the Mongolian political landscape. She also built up connections with officials such as Vyacheslav Molotov (who served as ambassador to the MPR at this time) and relied on the influence of Soviet leader Leonid Brezhnev whom she regularly "begged" for funds for a Palace of Pioneers and Young Technicians, pioneer camps, swimming pools and a Children's Fund.

The First Lady's Fund became one of the main institutions of the country.

== Later life and death ==
Filatova lived in Moscow with Tsedenbal after he fell from power and after he died in 1991. When she arrived in Ulaanbaatar from Moscow to attend Tsedenbal's funeral, the Mongolian prosecutor's office attempted to interrogate her upon arrival. During her last years, she lived in poverty and was often forced to sell her things in order make ends meet. Moreover, her eldest son Vladislav died unexpectedly when Anastasia was in the hospital in 1999. She died there on 21 October 2001, outliving her husband by 10 years. She was buried at the Vagankovo Cemetery in Moscow.

== Legacy ==
The Wedding Palace in Ulaanbaatar and the Ulaanbaatar Hotel was allegedly built on her initiative. The Nairamdal International Children's Center, located on the Bayangol Valley 30 km from Ulaanbaatar, was built in 1970s, which is the brainchild of Filatova. The center aimed to host international summer youth exchange programs with both Eastern bloc and Western countries. A statue of Filatova is erected in front of the center.

== Sources ==
- Shaken Nadirov, 1984 god (Moscow: Vostochnaya Literatura, 1995)
- Sergey Radchenko, "Mongolian Politics in the Shadow of the Cold War: The 1964 Coup Attempt and the Sino-Soviet Split", Journal of Cold War Studies, Vol. 8 (No. 1).
