= Badmaanyambuugiin Bat-Erdene =

Mongolian wrestler and politician

- Бадмаанямбуугийн Бат-Эрдэнэ
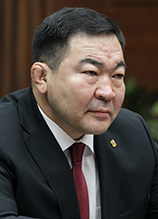
- Bat-Erdene in Moscow.

Minister of Defense
- In office 23 July 2016 – 20 October 2017
- Preceded by: Tserendashiin Tsolmon
- Succeeded by: Nyamaagiin Enkhbold

Personal details
- Born: 7 June 1964 (age 61) Khentii, Mongolia
- Party: Mongolian People's Party
- Website: http://bat-erdene.com

Badmaanyambuugiin Bat-Erdene (Mongolian: Бадмаанямбуугийн Бат-Эрдэнэ) is a Mongolian politician and athlete. Bat-Erdene is widely regarded in Mongolia as one of the most successful, long lasting and celebrated wrestlers, where he won in national non-jacketed wrestling formats as well as winning a gold medal in Sambo jacket wrestling in the 1989 World Sambo Championships in the over 100 kg heavyweight division. He was also Defense Minister of Mongolia from 2016 to July 2017.

== Biography ==
He was born on June 7, 1964, in Ömnödelger sum of Khentii aimag, Mongolia. He graduated from secondary school in 1982. He graduated from the Military Institute of the Mongolian People's Army in 1990 with a degree in law. He is married with 3 daughters. He can also speak Russian and English.

== Wrestling career ==
Between 1988-1999, Bat-Erdene won 11 national level tournaments in the Naadam. He was awarded with medals for his achievements including from the government. His rank/title in wrestling is "Dayar dursagdah, dalai dayan, tumniig bayasuulagch, darkhan avarga Bat-Erdene" literally meaning "Renowned by all, oceanic, makes people happy, strong titan Bat-Erdene" essentially the highest rank possible in Mongolian wrestling in Mongolia. He retired from wrestling in 2006.

Bat-Erdene established and owns Avarga (Champion) University which trains wrestlers, trainers and sportsmen in Ulaanbaatar.

== Political career ==
Bat-Erdene has been a member of the State Great Khural from 2004 being elected three times from his native Khentii province on behalf of Mongolian People's Party. In 2009-2010 he worked as the chairman of the Legal Standing Committee of the State Great Khural. As a member of parliament, Bat-Erdene has been active in talking to protect nature and homeland against irresponsible mining.

Mongolian People's Party selected him as its candidate for 2013 Presidential election. Incumbent President Tsakhiagiin Elbegdorj, candidate of Democratic Party won at 2013 Mongolian presidential election on June 26, 2013, with 50.23% of total votes while Bat-Erdene got 41.97%, and Natsagiin Udval, candidate of Mongolian People's Revolutionary Party got 6.5% of total votes.

On 23 July 2016, 90.6 percent of the members of parliament voted in favor of appointing Bat-Erdene as the Minister of Defense.

== Mongolian wrestling career record ==
Badmaanyambuugiin Bat-Erdene
Year	Level	Participants	Rank	Wins	Earned title	Notes
2006	State	1024	State Grand Champion	8		
2005	State	512	State Grand Champion	6		
2004	State	512	State Grand Champion	6		
2003	State	512	State Grand Champion	7		
2002	State	512	State Grand Champion	7		
2001	State	1024	State Grand Champion	9		
2000	State	512	State Grand Champion	7		
1999	State	512	State Grand Champion	9		
1998	State	512	State Grand Champion	9		
1997	State	512	State Grand Champion	9		
1996	State	512	State Grand Champion	9		
1995	State	512	State Grand Champion	9		
1994	State	768	State Grand Champion	10		
1993	State	512	State Grand Champion	9		
1992	State	512	State Grand Champion	9		
1991	State	512	State Grand Champion	7	Unud Bayasgalant	
1990	State	512	State Champion	9	State Grand Champion	
1989	State	512	State Lion	9	State Champion	
1988	State	512	State Elephant	9	State Lion	
1987	State	512	State Elephant	7		
1986	State	512	State Falcon	7	State Elephant	
1985	State	512	Lion of Aimag	5	State Falcon	
State Naadam Winner Won at least 5 rounds in State Naadam Aimag/Sum Naadam Promotion

== Notes ==
Olympic Games
Preceded by Dolgorsürengiin Sumyaabazar	Flagbearer for Mongolia; 2000 Sydney	Succeeded by Damdinsürengiin Nyamkhüü
