= Fradkov =

Fradkov (masculine, Russian: Фрадков) or Fradkova (feminine, Russian: Фрадкова) is a Russian surname. Notable people with the surname include:

- Mikhail Fradkov (born 1950), Russian politician
- Pavel Fradkov, Russian government official
- Pyotr Fradkov (born 1978), Russian economist and banker

== See also ==
- Fradkin
