= Natsagiin Udval =

Mongolian politician (born 1954)

- Нацагийн Удвал

Minister of Health
- In office August 2012 – November 2014
- Prime Minister: Norovyn Altankhuyag
- Preceded by: Nyamdavaagiin Khurelbaatar
- Succeeded by: Sambuugiin Lambaa

Personal details
- Born: 5 March 1954 (age 72) Erdenemandal, Arkhangai, Mongolia
- Party: Mongolian People's Revolutionary Party (2010–2021)

Natsagiin Udval (Mongolian: Нацагийн Удвал; born 5 March 1954) is a Mongolian politician. She has served as the secretary general of the Mongolian People's Revolutionary Party since 2010. Udval also served as the Health Minister of the Altankhuyag cabinet from 2012 to 2014. She was a candidate for the 2013 presidential election, being the first woman to do so. Udval supports former president Nambaryn Enkhbayar who is in prison on corruption charges.

== Career ==
Incumbent president Tsakhiagiin Elbegdorj, candidate of the Democratic Party, won the 2013 presidential election on 26 June 2013 with 50.23% of the total vote while the Mongolian People's Party candidate Badmaanyambuugiin Bat-Erdene got 41.97%, and Natsagiin Udval got 6.5% respectively.

As health minister, Udval's only notable work has been a change to the prisoners' medical treatment rule which allowed former President Nambaryn Enkhbayar, who was convicted of corruption charges, to spend less than a month in prison and spend most of his two and a half year jail term as a patient at the Second General Hospital, where high-ranking government officials are medically treated.
