= Tsakhiagiin Elbegdorj =

President of Mongolia from 2009 to 2017

- Цахиагийн Элбэгдорж
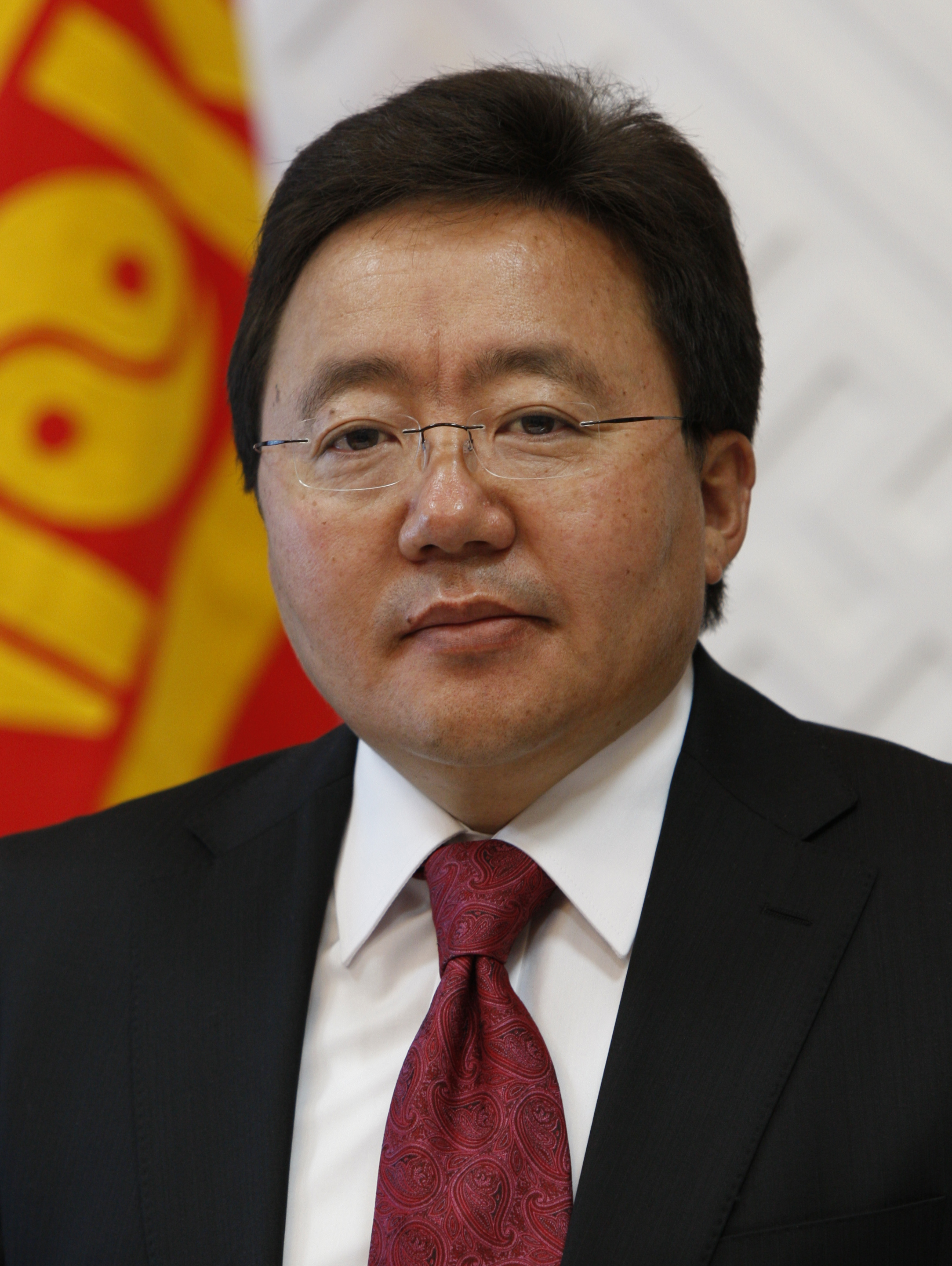
- Official portrait, 2009

President of Mongolia
- In office 18 June 2009 – 10 July 2017
- Prime Minister: Sanjiin Bayar; Sükhbaataryn Batbold; Norovyn Altankhuyag; Chimediin Saikhanbileg; Jargaltulgyn Erdenebat
- Preceded by: Nambaryn Enkhbayar
- Succeeded by: Khaltmaagiin Battulga

Prime Minister of Mongolia
- In office 20 August 2004 – 13 January 2006
- President: Natsagiin Bagabandi; Nambaryn Enkhbayar
- Preceded by: Nambaryn Enkhbayar
- Succeeded by: Miyeegombyn Enkhbold
- In office 23 April 1998 – 9 December 1998
- President: Natsagiin Bagabandi
- Preceded by: Mendsaikhany Enkhsaikhan
- Succeeded by: Janlavyn Narantsatsralt

Member of the State Great Khural
- In office 1992–1994
- Constituency: Khövsgöl Province
- In office 1996–2000
- Constituency: Bayankhongor Province
- In office 2008–2009
- Constituency: Ulaanbaatar, Chingeltei district

Member of the People's Great Khural and the State Little Khural
- In office 1990–1992

Personal details
- Born: 8 March 1963 (age 63) Zereg, Khovd, Mongolia
- Party: Democratic Party (since 2000)
- Other political affiliations: Mongolian National Democratic Party (1992–2000)
- Spouse: Khajidsuren Bolormaa
- Children: 25 (21 adopted)
- Education: Hetman Petro Sahaidachnyi National Ground Forces Academy; University of Colorado Boulder; Harvard University
- Website: www.elbegdorj.mn

Military service
- Allegiance: Mongolian People's Republic
- Branch/service: Mongolian People's Army
- Years of service: 1982–1983
- Rank: Corporal

Tsakhiagiin Elbegdorj (Mongolian: Цахиагийн Элбэгдорж; (Note: /ˌɛlbɛɡdɔːrdʒ ˈtsæxiə/ EL-beg-dorj TSAKH-ee-ə; Mongolian pronunciation: [t͡sʰæçʲɐˌɟiŋ ˈiɮpɪktɜrt͡ɕ]) born 8 March 1963), known internationally as Elbegdorj Tsakhia, is a Mongolian politician and journalist who served as the president of Mongolia from 2009 to 2017. He previously served as prime minister in 1998 and again from 2004 to 2006.

Elbegdorj was one of the key leaders of the 1990 Mongolian democratic revolution that ended 70 years of communist rule in Mongolia, and co-drafted the country's 1992 constitution that guaranteed democracy and a free market economy. Elbegdorj has been labeled by his supporters as a "freedom fighter" and the "Golden Sparrow of Democracy", alluding to a bird that comes with spring sunshine after a long, harsh winter.

Currently, Elbegdorj is a member of The Elders – established by Nelson Mandela in 2007 – that works for peace, justice, human rights and a sustainable planet. Moreover, he is a member of Club de Madrid which commits to advancing democracy worldwide. In addition, Elbegdorj is a commissioner of International Commission Against Death Penalty. Furthermore, he is a vice chairman of International Democracy Union, the international alliance of centre-right political parties. Elbegdorj is a patron of World Sustainable Development Forum. He is the Bernard and Susan Liautaud visiting fellow at Stanford University's Freeman Spogli Institute for International Studies. Elbegdorj is a president of World Mongol Federation - an international federation of Mongols around the world.

His presidential tenure has focused on fighting corruption, environmental protection, women's rights, judicial reform, civic engagement, economic liberalization and privatization, property rights, and the abolition of the death penalty.

Elbegdorj is the founder of the Ardchilal (lit. 'Democracy') newspaper – the country's first independent newspaper – and helped to establish the first independent television station in Mongolia.

== Early life and education ==
Elbegdorj was born into a nomadic herding family in Zereg, Khovd Province, on 8 March 1963. He was the youngest of eight sons. Elbegdorj spent most of his early childhood herding livestock through the high mountains of Zereg sum. His father, Mongolyn Tsakhia, was a veteran of Mongolia's border conflict with the Empire of Japan that resulted in the 1939 Battle of Khalkhyn Gol. Elbegdorj finished the sum's eight-year school (Primary & middle school) in 1979. Afterwards, his family moved to Erdenet city, and he finished Erdenet's No. 1 ten-year school (High school) in 1981.

=== Army and studies in the USSR ===
In 1981–82, Elbegdorj worked in copper ore mining and processing plant Erdenet Concern (currently Erdenet Mining Corporation) as a machinist. In 1982, he was drafted into military service. For submitting poems to the army newspaper Ulaan Od (Red Star), which impressed army authorities, and heading a Revolutionary Youth Unit in the army, he was awarded with the possibility to study military journalism and Marxism–Leninism at the USSR's Military Political Institute (present day - Hetman Petro Sahaidachnyi National Ground Forces Academy) under the umbrella of Lviv Polytechnic National University in Lviv, Ukraine from 1983 on. He graduated from the academy in 1988 with a bachelor's degree in journalism and then began working for the newspaper Ulaan Od.

=== Harvard Kennedy School ===
After his first term as prime minister, he spent a year at the University of Colorado Boulder's Economic Institute. Then Elbegdorj studied with a full scholarship at Harvard University and graduated from Harvard's John F. Kennedy School of Government with a Master of Public Administration (MPA) in 2002.

== Early political activism ==
During his studies in the USSR, Elbegdorj was exposed to concepts of glasnost, freedom of speech and economic liberties. Upon returning to Mongolia, he met other like-minded people and tried to present those ideas to a wider audience, despite attempts of government repression government, and threats by his employer to lose his job. On 28 November 1989, at the end of a speech at the Young Artists' Second National Congress, Elbegdorj called for democratization in Mongolia and urged youth collaboration to achieve it. He told the audience "We consider that perestroika is a timely and brave step. Youth's contribution to this revolutionary matter is not by supportive talks but by certain work. Our contribution is our objectives to be fulfilled. Our objectives are: ... following democracy and transparency and contributing to glasnost, ... and supporting fair progressive power ... These are the objectives of an initiatives' group-an organization that shall work. After the congress I hope we will gather and discuss with you about it in this (newly forming group). The organization shall be based on public, voluntary and democratic principles." His speech was promptly stopped by the chairman of the congress, who warned him not to say such things.

Since 1921, Mongolia had operated as a one-party communist state, the Mongolian People's Republic. During the break of the congress, Elbegdorj met with two young individuals, who agreed to found an underground democratic movement. Later the three met and united with ten other individuals, colloquially known now as the "First Thirteen of Democracy" or the "Golden Sparrows of Democracy." Following the Congress, he was warned by his boss at Ulaan Od that further participation in activities inconsistent with socialist ideology would led to his job termination. Despite the warning, Elbegdorj and his friends met secretly with other young people in the auditorium of the National University of Mongolia for discussion about democracy, free market economic policy, and the draft plan of organizing the democratic movement. The underground group met in secret many times and gradually grew in size in late 1989. Posters for their first open demonstration in the streets were put up.

On the morning of 10 December 1989, the first open pro-democracy demonstration met in front of the Youth Cultural Center in Ulaanbaatar. There, the creation of the Mongolian Democratic Union (MDU), the country's first non-governmental political organization, was announced. The MDU, chaired by Sanjaasürengiin Zorig, publicly petitioned the government for a real implementation of perestroika, a multi-party system, and the total implementation of the Universal Declaration of Human Rights in all party and government affairs. In the subsequent months, the MDU continued to organize demonstrations, rallies, protests and hunger strikes, as well as teachers' and workers' strikes. The activists received growing support from Mongolians, both in the capital and the countryside.

After numerous demonstrations, the Politburo of the Mongolian People's Revolutionary Party (MPRP) – the highest authority of the government – eventually gave way to the pressure and entered negotiations with the opposition leaders on 8 March 1990. After an agreement was reached between the two sides on 9 March 1990, Jambyn Batmönkh, leader of the MPRP, decided to dissolve the Politburo and to resign later that evening, paving the way for political reform in Mongolia. The news was announced to the hunger strikers and to people who'd gathered on Sükhbaatar Square by Elbegdorj at 10 PM on that day. Following the first democratic elections in July 1990, Mongolia became the first Asian country to successfully transition from communist rule to democracy.

In a documentary film about the President (titled: "Man of the People") released in the year of the 25th-anniversary celebrations of the Mongolian democratic changes, President Elbegdorj tells the story of the historical political change and reinventing democracy.

== Journalism career ==
Elbegdorj worked as a correspondent at Ulaan Od, the newspaper of the Mongolian People's Army and as a chief of an army literature unit between 1988 and 1990. While in these positions, Elbegdorj wrote articles disclosing all the good and bad in the army units and suggested improvements for the army prior to the democratic movement.

Elbegdorj founded Mongolia's first independent newspaper Ardchilal (lit. 'Democracy') and worked as its first editor-in-chief in 1990. The newspaper played a major role in completing the country's democratic revolution. He co-introduced freedom of the press in the country by co-initiating the Law on Press Freedom and playing a key role in passing the law in 1998.

Elbegdorj also helped to create Mongolia's first independent TV station Eagle TV in 1994. It was run by the former Mongolian Broadcasting Company, a joint venture of the U.S. Christian missionary organization AMONG Foundation, and the Mongolia Media Corporation.

== Political ascent (1990–1998) ==
Elbegdorj was elected to the Mongolian legislature four times, in 1990, 1992, 1996 and 2008. During his time as deputy to the People's Great Khural and the Little Khural from the Mongolian Democratic Party (MDP), the Constitution of Mongolia was drafted and ratified by then president Punsalmaagiin Ochirbat on 13 January 1992. In addition to guaranteeing human rights, democracy, freedom of religion, and free speech, the new constitution established a new unicameral parliament, the State Great Khural.

As a member of the MDP, Elbegdorj was elected to the State Great Khural in the 1992 election. The opposition alliance, between the MDP, the Mongolian National Progress Party, and the Mongolian United Party, won four of the 76 seats compared to the MPRP's majority of 70 seats. The three parties merged into the Mongolian National Democratic Party (MNDP) following the election in 1992. Later in 1994, Elbegdorj resigned from his post as legislator and was replaced by Ryenchinsambuugiin Odonbaatar in 1994.

In April 1996, he was elected the chairman of the MNDP and co-led the Democratic Union Coalition (DUC) with the Mongolian Social Democratic Party. The opposition coalition won a historic victory in the 1996 parliamentary elections, securing 50 seats, enough to form a government. Elbegdorj was chosen the Majority Leader of the DUC and as the Deputy Chairman of the State Great Khural in 1996, while DUC campaign manager Mendsaikhany Enkhsaikhan was appointed prime minister. As part of its election campaign, the DUC laid out further privatization efforts and economic reform to transition the country's economy. Elbegdorj supported the privatization of state-owned properties and assets and land.

While as the chairman of the State Commission on Rehabilitation, Elbegdorj initiated and brought the state to apologize for the victims and families of over 36,000 people who had been persecuted and massacred during the years of Mongolian People's Party's communist rule. He played a key role in the approval of the Rehabilitation Law, which provided rehabilitation and compensation to the survivors and families of political victims, and recovery from the Stalinist purges and prohibited future violation of human rights. In addition, the law established a Memorial Day for Political Victims. Furthermore, Elbegdorj was a member of the National Counseling Committee of the MNDP in 1994–2009; leader and chairman of the MNDP in 1996–1999, and April 2006 – September 2008 respectively; and chairman of the Democratic Union Coalition of the MNDP and Mongolian Social Democratic Party in 1996–2000. In January 1998, the constitutional clause forbiding lawmakers from ministerial responsibilities was removed. In the wake of the economic impact of the 1997 Asian financial crisis, political maneuvers by several DUC legislators were made to increase the coordination of parliament and the cabinet. Later on 27 March 1998, the MNDP's highest decision-making body called for the resignation of incumbent prime minister Enkhsaikhan. He resigned on 17 April 1998 following increased pressure from lawmakers and economic stagnation.

== First premiership (1998) ==
On 23 April 1998, the State Great Khural elected (61–6) MNDP chairman Elbegdorj as the prime minister. He nominated his nine-member cabinet composition to parliament on 27 April 1998. But only five of the nine ministers were appointed by the State Great Khural. His cabinet didn't fully form until 28 May 1998 when parliament confirmed the last remaining minister, Chimediin Saikhanbileg, the fifth nominee for the education minister. The age and experience of several cabinet members were questioned by the public.

During his first term, Elbegdorj co-initiated the Law on Press Freedom in 1998. Based on this law, another law was passed that changed all daily state newspapers into public newspapers without direct control and censorship from the government. Following a controversial government decision to merge insolvent state-owned Redevelopment Bank with private Golomt Bank, parliamentary procedures were boycotted by the opposition MPRP lawmakers. The impasse slated key legislative bills throughout June and led to a motion of no confidence in July when a parliamentary working group found the merger, advised by IMF and World Bank, improper. On 25 July 1998, Elbegdorj's cabinet was ousted with 42 lawmakers against and 33 in favor. He became the then shortest-serving prime minister of Mongolia, with only three months, and remained caretaker until a successor was nominated and appointed.

Erdenet Mining Corporation (EMC), the biggest state revenue contributor and joint stock company owned by the governments of Mongolia and the Russian Federation, became a political issue in August 1998 after the EMC didn't pay its due tax and royalty to the government in time. An audit of EMC was ordered by Elbegdorj, which later revealed that the state-due income didn't enter the state account, instead, it went to dubious accounts of directors at EMC, notably its chairman Sh.Otgonbileg. The embezzlement case was reported in detail in investigative series "Swindle of the Century" on Eagle television. The chairman was forcibly dismissed on 20 August 1998, and a brief special regime was installed in EMC until agreements were reached.

Nomination of Davaadorjiin Ganbold to premiership was rejected by president Natsagiin Bagabandi, elected from the MPRP in 1997. Bagabandi rejected three nominees a total of 11 times (Davaadorjiin Ganbold was rejected 7 times alone) on the premise of inexperience. A fourth nominee, approved by Bagabandi, was voted out by parliament. On 2 October 1998, Sanjaasürengiin Zorig, lead figure of the Democratic Revolution and sitting infrastructure minister, was assassinated at his home, the same day DUC leaders agreed upon to nominate him to premiership. The motives of his murder, assumed political, remains unknown to this day.

The Reconstruction Bank, which had its merger prevented by parliament, bankrupted soon after Elbegdorj's term was over; leading the government to suffer a gigantic financial loss. He stayed in office until mayor of Ulaanbaatar, Janlavyn Narantsatsralt, replaced him on 9 December 1998.

=== Post first premiership ===
Elbegdorj served as the chairman of the Majority Group of the Parliament and the leader of the Democratic Union Coalition and a Member of Parliament respectively from 1996 to 2000.

In 2000–2001, he studied at the University of Colorado Boulder's Economic Institute, and earned a diploma. Then he studied with a full scholarship of Harvard University at Harvard's John F. Kennedy School of Government and graduated with a Master of Public Administration (M.P.A.) in 2002.

Then he worked as a consultant at the Millennium Development Goal Project, United Nations Headquarters in New York City and as a consultant at Radio Free Asia in Washington, D.C. in 2002–2003. Afterwards, he returned to Mongolia and made series of public speeches touring in Mongolian provinces, sharing his new ideas and perspectives based on his knowledge from Harvard University and the United States in combination with Mongolian way of life in 2003–2004. His lectures played a significant role in leading the Democratic Party, founded after the merger of the DUC parties in 2000, to secure majority seats in 2004 elections.

== Second premiership (2004–2006) ==
On 20 August 2004, as a non-member of parliament, Elbegdorj became the prime minister of Mongolia for the second time. He unveiled a grand coalition government between the Motherland Democratic Coalition (MDC) and the MPRP after a hung parliament was convened following the 2004 parliamentary elections. Despite the powersharing, the MDC was dissolved by itself on 19 December 2004, primarily due to the political disputes within the DP and split between coalition leaders. During the breakdown, coalition dissidents re-founded the Mongolian Social Democratic Party in December 2004.

During Elbegdorj's second term, the government-controlled Mongolian National Broadcaster was converted into a formally independent public organisation with limited state control on 27 January 2005. The implementation of the plan has been slowed by numerous disputes. Anti-corruption initiatives and poverty reduction programs were taken to combat what Elbegdorj saw as "the biggest challenges to Mongolia's economic development." His cabinet signed the United Nations Convention Against Corruption in April 2005 and ratified it in January 2006.

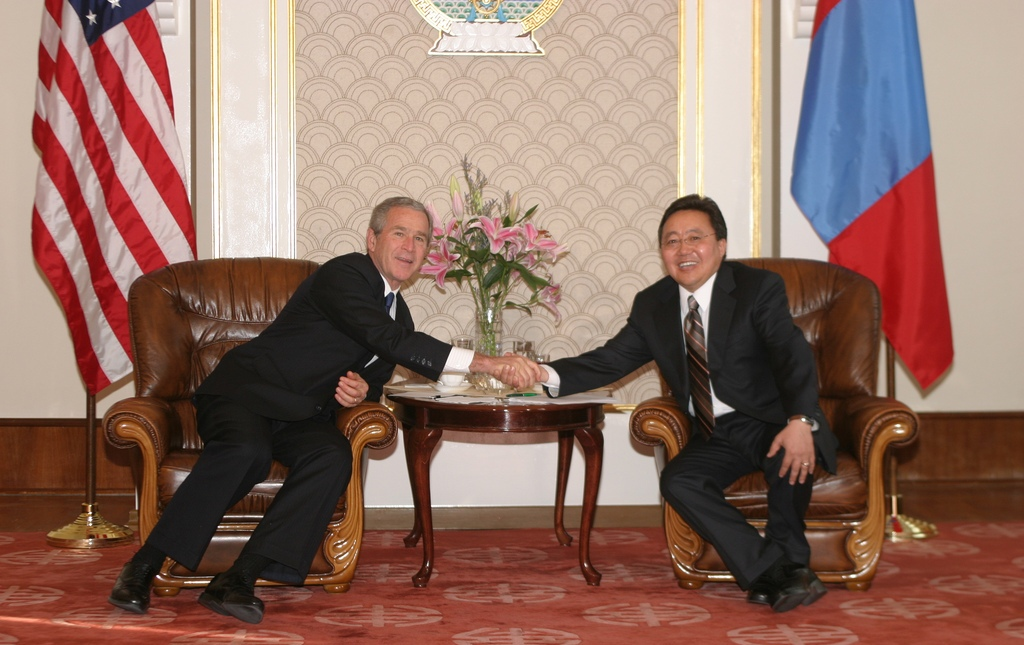
U.S. president George W. Bush meeting with Elbegdorj in Ulaanbaatar on 21 November 2005

U.S. president George W. Bush highlighted about Elbegdorj as one of the country's democratic leaders to have been serving as the prime minister in his speech in Ulaanbaatar on 21 November 2005. "The world needs more people such as yourself who are willing to admire liberty," President Bush wrote to Elbegdorj immediately after his visit to Mongolia.

Elbegdorj attempted to support domestic businesses by eliminating excessive regulations, many licensing requirements, and import taxes for key category products. Mongolia was accepted into the European Union's GSP+ system, which allows Mongolian exporters to pay lower customs tariffs when exporting to the European Union.

By a decision of his government, English replaced Russian as the first foreign language to be taught in public schools. Renovations of the Government House were initiated by Elbegdorj. The renovations, starting from 2005, abolished Sükhbaatar's Mausoleum for the erection of the Genghis Khan memorial complex in commemoration of the 800th Anniversary of the Mongol Empire.

In August 2005, Elbegdorj announced his intention to run in the by-elections in Bayangol district, following the election of MPRP chairman Nambaryn Enkhbayar as president in 2005. However, the MPRP threatened to leave the coalition if Elbegdorj ran against MPRP leader and by-election candidate Miyeegombyn Enkhbold, causing him to backdown. Due to political infighting within his own party, several DP lawmakers crossed the floor in protest to Elbegdorj. The foundation of the New National Party by Mendsaikhany Enkhsaikhan and the People's Party by Lamjavyn Gündalai tipped the parliamentary balance towards the MPRP in late 2005.

On 13 January 2006, MPRP ministers left the cabinet, forcing Elbegdorj to resign after a year and a half in office. The MPRP proceeded to form a new government led by Miyeegombyn Enkhbold with the support from DP defectors and third-party MPs. The events triggered protests from several civic groups and their followers. The Mongolian economy had a real GDP growth of 10.4% in 2004, 7.3% in 2005 and 8.6% in 2006 respectively during Elbegdorj's second term.

== Presidential elections ==
=== 2009 presidential election ===
Results by provinces and municipal district

2009 presidential election results

2013 presidential election results

On 3 April 2009, Elbegdorj defeated Erdeniin Bat-Üül with 65.3% of the total vote at the Democratic Party's presidential primaries. After his candidacy was announced, the Civil Will Party and the Mongolian Green Party, both eligible for presidential candidacy, endorsed Elbegdorj's presidential campaign.

On 24 May 2009, Elbegdorj won the 2009 presidential election with 51.21% of the votes, defeating incumbent president Nambaryn Enkhbayar, who got 47.41% of the popular vote. Elbegdorj was subsequently sworn into office as the fourth President of Mongolia on 18 June 2009.

=== 2013 presidential election ===
On 7 May 2013, during the convention of the DP's National Consultative Committee, Elbegdorj was re-nominated as presidential candidate from the party with 100% votes. His nomination was further unanimously supported at the Party Congress, with 7,000 participants from across the country, on 8 May 2013. The Civil Will–Green Party and the Mongolian National Democratic Party – coalition partner to the governing DP – endorsed Elbegdorj's candidacy. The extra-parliamentary Republican Party and the Motherland Party also expressed their full support for Elbegdorj.

On 26 June 2013, Elbegdorj won the 2013 presidential election with 50.23% of total votes, becoming the country's third president to be re-elected. In comparison, Badmaanyambuugiin Bat-Erdene from the opposition Mongolian People's Party received 41.97% while Natsagiin Udval from the Mongolian People's Revolutionary Party got 6.5% of total vote.

== Presidency (2009–2017) ==
Elbegdorj won the Mongolian presidential elections twice: on 24 May 2009 and 26 June 2013. Elbegdorj was sworn into office on 18 June 2009 for his first term, and on 10 July 2013 for his second term as President of Mongolia. Elbegdorj is Mongolia's first president to never have been a member of the former communist Mongolian People's Revolutionary Party and the first to obtain a Western education.

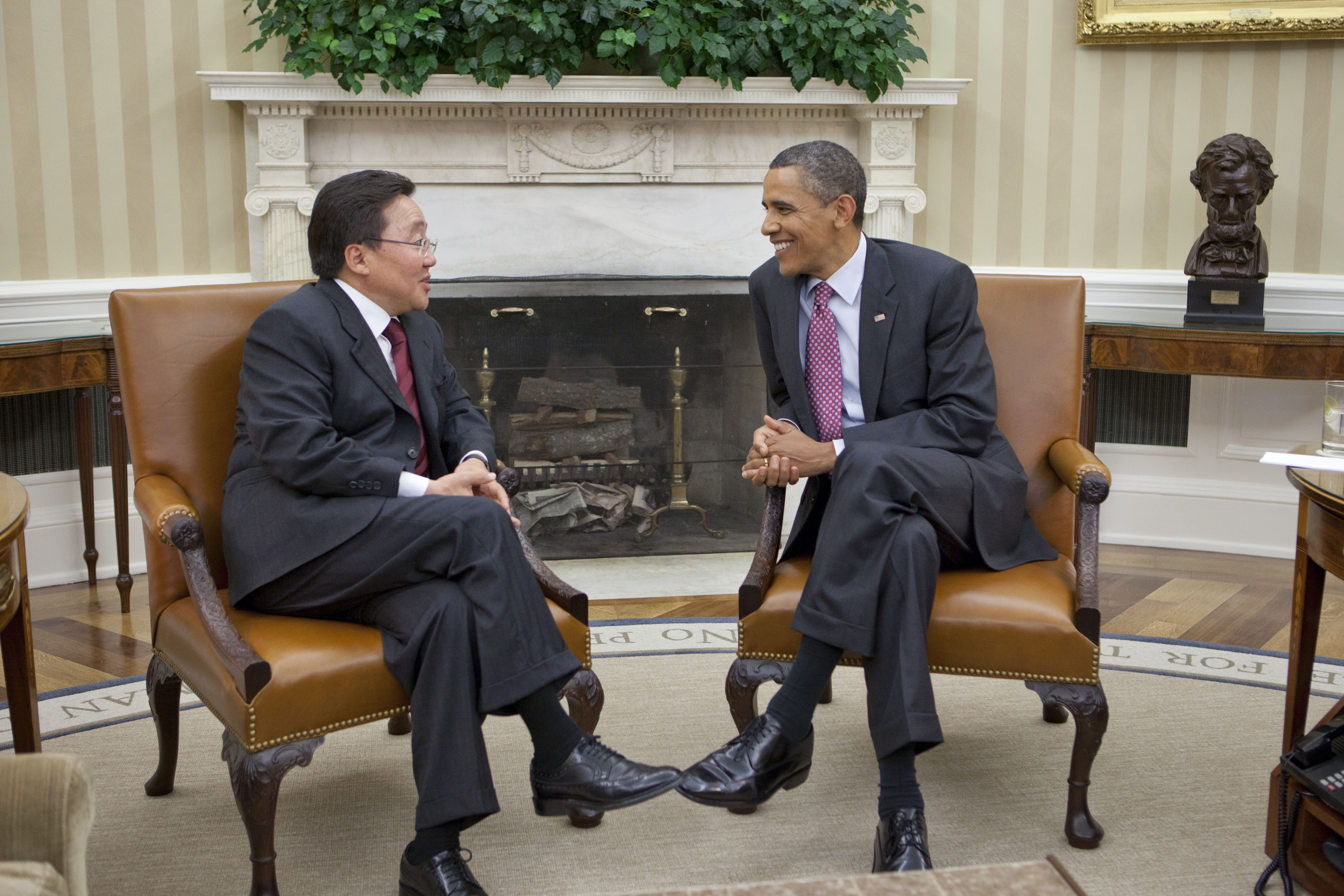
President Elbegdorj meeting with U.S. president Barack Obama in June 2011

=== Inauguration ===
Elbegdorj was sworn into office for his first term as President of Mongolia in State House in front of the Parliament and guests on 18 June 2009. His inauguration ceremony included his address to the nation and a military parade on Sükhbaatar Square. The United States Senate passed Resolution Number 192 supporting Mongolia's democracy and economic development and noting Elbegdorj's election victory on the day he was sworn in on 18 June 2009.

For his second term as President of Mongolia, Elbegdorj was sworn into office in front of the Chinggis Khaan (also referred as Genghis Khan) monument, Nine White Banners of Mongolia, the Parliament and public on Sükhbaatar Square on 10 July 2013. This is the first time a Mongolian president made an oath in front of public in the country's history. After making an oath, he addressed to the nation, and a military parade followed. Nobel Peace Laureate, co-founder of the Soviet bloc's first independent trade union Solidarity, former Polish president Lech Wałęsa attended Elbegdorj's second inauguration as president.

=== Democracy and human rights ===
==== Presidency of the Community of Democracies ====
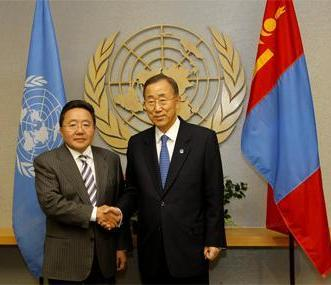
UN Secretary General Ban Ki-moon and Elbegdorj meet at the UN Headquarters on 19 September 2011

Elbegdorj served as a chair of the Community of Democracies from 2011 to 2013, an intergovernmental coalition of democratic countries of which Mongolia is a participating member. Under his presidency, Mongolia successfully organized the VII Ministerial Conference of the Community of Democracies with democracy icon guest speakers namely chairperson of the National League for Democracy in Burma and Nobel Peace Laureate Aung San Suu Kyi, "Mother of the Revolution" of 2011 Yemeni uprising and Nobel Peace Laureate Tawakkol Karman, Elbegdorj, Thailand's prime minister Yingluck Shinawatra and others, on 27–29 April 2013. The conference had over 1300 participants from more than 100 countries and issued Ulaanbaatar Declaration "Community's Attainments and Global Challenges."

Within the coalition, Elbegdorj led initiatives such as Zero Tolerance of Corruption and Education for Democracy and spoke on behalf of the initiatives at the 66th session of the General Assembly of the United Nations on 21 September 2011. He worked with the coalition members to form an agenda to consolidate civil society and strengthen democracy.

==== Advocating democracy and human rights ====
Elbegdorj is a frequent lecturer on democracy and human rights, both domestically and abroad. Elbegdorj said in his speech "It is a human desire to live free that is an eternal power" at Kim Il Sung University in North Korea. Elbegdorj remarked "I truly believe in freedom for each and every individual" at the Bundestag. One of his latest public speeches is "Myanmar and Mongolia: On the Road to Freedom and Democracy" made jointly with Nobel Peace Laureate Aung San Suu Kyi in Ulaanbaatar on 30 April 2013. Aung San Suu Kyi publicly expressed her appreciation in person to Elbegdorj for having been a strong voice in Asia for her release from house arrest in Myanmar (Burma) until her release. At the ASEM8 Summit on 3 October 2010, Elbegdorj openly called on Myanmar's authorities to free Nobel laureate Aung San Suu Kyi from house arrest, and not long after she was released. In June 2016 President Elbegdorj visited the newly elected State Counsellor and Minister of Foreign Affairs, Aung San Suu Kyi "in honor of the 60th anniversary of the diplomatic ties between Mongolia and Myanmar". During the same visit he addressed a full house audience of civil servants sharing the values of democratic societies, urging them to fight against corruption. In 2012, following his talks at the Parliament of Kyrgyzstan and meeting with Kyrgyz NGO leaders and students to share Mongolia's experience towards democracy for two decades, Elbegdorj began the establishment of the Democratic Transition Assistance Foundation of Mongolia. The new initiative calls for the allocation of certain funds from the Mongolian budget to be used to support democratic transitions in Kyrgyzstan and Afghanistan along with economic reforms in countries such as North Korea and Myanmar while using Mongolia's democratic reform and consolidation as a model. In the summer of 2012, the foundation hosted several delegations from Kyrgyzstan, North Korea and Myanmar to study Mongolia's experience of judicial reform and mineral legislation.

To encourage the adoption of democratic governance in Asian countries, Elbegdorj, along with Korean President Lee Myung Bak, started the Asian Partnership for Democracy initiative in 2011 as an arm of the Community of Democracies with a particular focus on the region in which Mongolia is one of the longest standing democracies.

Elbegdorj condemned the violence in Syria and called on world leaders to unify to end the bloodshed. He criticized the attack on the US Embassy in Libya by saying "The mission of diplomacy is peaceful. Attacking diplomatic compounds are violation of both the letter and spirit of international law," in his address to the 67th session of the United Nations General Assembly on 27 September 2012. The U.S. Foreign Policy Association and the National Endowment for Democracy (NED) awarded Elbegdorj with the New York Democracy Forum's Presidential Medal on 22 September 2011. The award recognized "the vital role Elbegdorj played in Mongolia's historic democratic revolution in 1989, the country's successful democratic transition, the consolidation of its new democratic institutions and his solidarity with other democrats in Asia, the Middle East and other regions."

In 2000 Elbegdorj founded Mongolia's Liberty Center, a non-governmental organization advocating human rights, freedom of expression and education. Elbegdorj spoke at many democracy conferences including "Re-founding America" conference sponsored by the International Society for Individual Liberty in Williamsburg, Virginia, United States in 2007 prior to his presidency.

==== Direct democracy and civic participation ====
In 2008, Elbegdorj opened the Citizens' Hall – a public hearing forum which encourages the participation of Mongolian citizens in the parliament's decision-making. In each proceeding, citizens are given time to speak and express their opinions on pending legislation. The hall is open to any of Mongolia's 2.9 million people and is located in Ulaanbaatar; some additional halls have been opened in other provinces. They are designed to encourage civil participation to have a consensus between legislators and citizens before any open issue becomes law.

Elbegdorj emphasized "Democracy is about empowering the people and not bestowing power to someone," "The time has come to transfer to the discretion of the people, to the business and professional communities especially in the countryside the power to make decisions for themselves and to engage in businesses and services they are naturally entitled to," "The progress and prosperity of a civil society is defined not by centralization of power, but with transfer of rights, effective exercise of the rights by people," in his inaugural address for his first term as president.

Elbegdorj created a concept for decentralization: increasing local powers with civic participation, creating local development funds, and giving financial support to local authorities from central government budget. He submitted the concept to the Parliament to make it a part of the new Organic Budget Law and the law was passed with the part. When the bill was under discussion, the Presidential Office in collaboration with the Budget Standing Committee of the Parliament organized "Empowering Local Administration with Civic Participation" forum with guest speakers from Direct Democracy Center in Switzerland at Elbegdorj's invitation on 27 May 2011. The centre's director also lectured on "Local level structure of direct democracy in Switzerland" to Mongolian students. Then Elbegdorj's office developed a policy document reflecting suggestions of citizens discussed in the Citizens' Hall and Elbegdorj issued a decree to approve "Medium and long term national policy document on decentralization through direct democracy and civic participation."

Then, from 8 September 2012 through April 2013, his office jointly with local governments and parliaments organized nationwide training "Direct democracy – Budget management with civic participation" for ordinary citizens, civil servants and local authorities about how citizens can participate in local government budget spending from local development funds to decide life in their localities. Elbegdorj said "citizen participation and monitoring are still missing in the public decision making. There cannot be a civil society without citizen participation," in his remarks at the National Diet of Japan in 2010.

==== Women's rights ====
Elbegdorj has long been an advocate for women's rights and more proportional representation of women in the decision-making level of governments. He stressed the importance of women in leadership, highlighting the three-fold increase of women representatives elected in the 2012 Mongolian parliamentary elections in his speech at the UN General Assembly in September 2012. "We need more women leaders. Women tend to see the whole picture. For society to advance, we need more women in public service at all levels – local to global. They bring a unique perspective often missing in global challenges," Elbegdorj said "Have you ever heard of a woman bloody dictator or tyrant? I think not. If there were more women in power, I think we would have more harmony, more engagement and less suffering and less conflict."

On 9 July 2011 during the meeting with Elbegdorj in Ulaanbaatar, U.S. Secretary of State Hillary Clinton praised Mongolia's recent parliamentary elections in which nine women were elected and applauded Mongolia for its "courage" in building a democratic system in a country surrounded by Russia and China. "Mongolia encourages women’s involvement in the political system with the intention of improving their role in society" Elbegdorj said in his lecture at the Diplomatic Academy of Vietnam in November 2013. In the 2013 Mongolian presidential election, Natsagiin Udval, Mongolia's first female presidential contender ran against Elbegdorj. Elbegdorj said "Public policies on social welfare or protection should reflect kindness and tenderness of mothers," in his public lecture at Yangon University in Yangon, Myanmar.

==== Abolition of capital punishment ====
On 14 January 2010, Elbegdorj announced that he would, henceforth, systematically use his prerogative to pardon all persons sentenced to death. He stated that most countries in the world had abolished the death penalty, and Mongolia should follow their example. He suggested that capital punishment would be commuted to a thirty-year prison sentence. The decision was controversial; when Elbegdorj announced it in Parliament, MPRP representatives did not give the applause customarily due after a presidential speech. (See: Capital punishment in Mongolia)

Elbegdorj stated "Capital punishment is wrong–it degrades human dignity. It brings no peace to society. It does not deter crime and does not lift up mankind," at the High-Level Meeting on the Rule of Law of the 67th session of the United Nations General Assembly on 24 September 2012. "By ratifying the Second Optional Protocol Mongolia would add yet one more country in the world community to fully abolish the death penalty. Pardoning a life does not mean pardoning a penalty. The punishment for serious and cruel felonies must be severe and must be just. However, I do not think it is just to deprive any citizens of life in the name of the state. The right to life is one of the fundamental rights of a human being and cannot depend on anyone, not even on the head of state. The state should respect very fundamental human rights, and secure them by law," Elbegdorj pointed out in his greeting to the delegation of the 5th international meeting of Justice Ministers on 18 May 2010.

Four months after Elbegdorj's announcement of a moratorium on the death penalty by his pardon, a survey was conducted among Mongolian legal academics asking whether it is right or wrong to abolish the death penalty in Mongolia. 83% of the survey participants responded that it was wrong. They criticized "By pardoning death row inmates, the Mongolian President directly interferes in criminal procedures. Nobody has the right to change court rulings." According to Article 33.1.8 of the Constitution, the Mongolian president has the prerogative "to grant pardon." Some academics and critics considered that it is too early and wrong to abolish death penalty in Mongolia, explaining that murder crimes are becoming too brutal and severe since the death penalty would not be implemented.

Despite much criticism from domestic conservative politicians, the opposition, and critics, Elbegdorj's decision was positively received internationally. Amnesty International noted "President Elbegdorj's actions demonstrate commitment to the protection of human rights and set a good example for other Asian countries in the region," on 18 February 2010. International organization "Hands off Cain" awarded Elbegdorj with "Abolitionist of the Year 2011" noting Mongolia as an example that fosters the right to life among Asian countries.

Finally, in 2012, the Mongolian parliament amended a law to join the Second Optional Protocol to the International Covenant on Civil and Political Rights, making Mongolia a state party to the convention and reinforcing the country's commitment to the abolition of capital punishment.

For the 6th World Congress Against the Death Penalty in June 2016, President Elbegdorj sent a video message in which he stands up against capital punishment and shares his views and taken actions to fully abolish death penalty in Mongolia. He did share the same views during his visit to Strasbourg in 2015 addressing the European Parliament.

=== Foreign policy ===
==== Mongolia hosts 11th Asia-Europe Meeting (ASEM) Summit ====
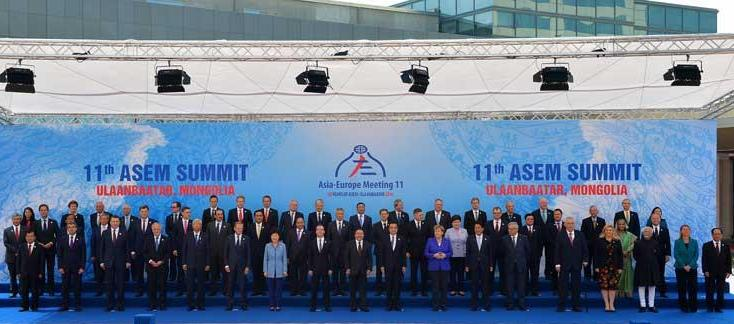
Asia Europe Meeting 11 in Ulaanbaatar on 15–16 July 2016

Under the leadership of Elbegdorj, Mongolia hosted the 11th Asia–Europe Meeting (ASEM 11) in Ulaanbaatar, on 15 and 16 July 2016, for the first time. Leaders, heads of state, prime ministers, and delegates from 51 countries, the European Commission, and ASEAN participated in the summit under the theme "20 Years of ASEM: Partnership for the Future through Connectivity."

About foreign policy, "Mongolia shall remain an active member of the international community and shall actively cooperate in addressing regional and global challenges," Elbegdorj emphasized in his inaugural address for his first term as President of Mongolia on 18 June 2009. Moreover, he noted that Mongolia shall foster and expand cooperation with the country's two neighbours and "third neighbours," in the same address. "Mongolia shall consistently continue her traditional foreign policies enriched with new content and dimensions," he stated in the same speech.

To strengthen relations with the countries of the European Union, President Elbegdorj addressed the European Parliament in Strasbourg, in June 2015. In his speech, Elbegdorj defines Mongolia as a strategic anchor for the EU in the East: "The EU is the world’s premier invention for advancing global prosperity, peace and harmony. Mongolia will be a strategic anchor for the EU in the East, helping advance our shared values and interests, and for building peace, democracy and engagement in Asia." In a documentary film titled "Mongolia – Democratic Anchor of the East" Elbegdorj was interviewed about the third-neighbour policy and foreign affairs.

Elbegdorj reiterated "Mongolia shall continue her open and pro-active engagement and cooperation at the regional and international fora," "Mongolia shall continue her constructive cooperation with other countries and international organizations. We shall work to promote mutually beneficial and constructive decisions in bilateral relations with our neighbours in infrastructure, investment, trade, transit transport and other pending issues," in his inaugural address for his second term as president on 10 July 2013. Elbegdorj praised the choice of the Kyrgyz people for parliamentary governance and their resolute struggle for freedom and justice in his speech at the Kyrgyz Parliament in April 2012. Following traditional friendly relations with North Korea, 50,000 North Korean football fans cheered Elbegdorj in a stadium for his football kick during his official visit to North Korea in October 2013. Elbegdorj gave a lecture titled "It is the human desire to live free that is an eternal power," as the first foreign Head of State to read a lecture on this topic at the Kim Il Sung University.

==== Participation in UN Peacekeeping operations ====
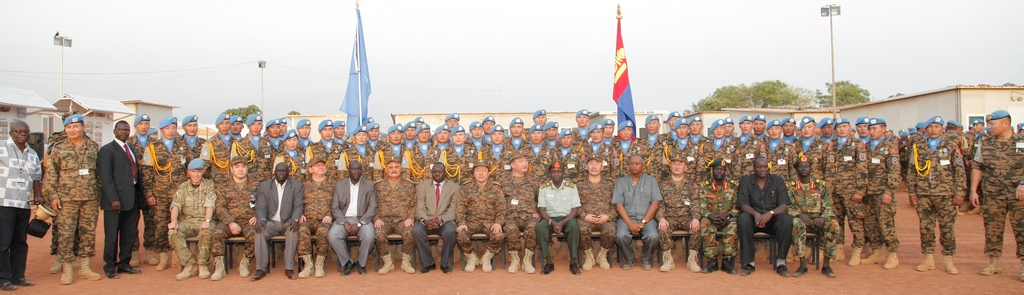
Elbegdorj in the center of front row, with the UNMISS and South Sudanese authorities, and Mongolian troops in South Sudan on 15 February 2013

As commander-in-chief of the Mongolian Armed Forces, he continued Mongolia's commitment in United Nations Peacekeeping operations. Since 2001, Mongolian troops have participated in international peacekeeping missions in Iraq, Sierra Leone, South Sudan, Ethiopia, Congo, Eritrea, Chad, Darfur, Western Sahara, Georgia, and Afghanistan; becoming one of the top 20 peacekeeping contributors to UN missions in 2009.

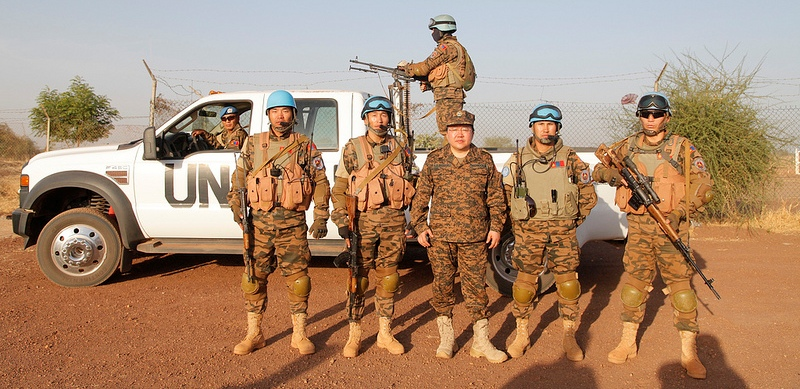
Elbegdorj in the center of front row, with Mongolian troops in South Sudan on 15 February 2013

On 15 February 2013, Elbegdorj visited South Sudan to meet with Mongolian soldiers in the United Nations Mission in South Sudan (UNMISS).

"Elbegdorj's visit was the first to South Sudan by a head of state from outside Africa. His visit is also the first from a country contributing troops to the UN mission," Hiruy Amanuel, chief political affairs representative at UNMISS said. As an officer in the Mongolian Armed Forces, Elbegdorj's son Erdene Elbegdorj participated in the UNMISS from March to November 2013.

In addition, as an active member of the UN peacekeeping missions, "Mongolia stands committed to enhancing its contribution, including through hosting training for civil police and medical personnel at its training centre," Elbegdorj stated at the General Debate of the 64th session of the United Nations General Assembly on 28 September 2009.

Analysing the role of peacekeeping in Mongolia's military strategy, Christopher Pultz mentions in his article the related "third neighbours" policy of the President: "Mongolia is developing a unique military strategy that attempts to balance conventional and peacekeeping capabilities. Having moved away from its previous security arrangements with Russia, Mongolia now pursues a foreign policy that will facilitate global engagement while allowing the country to maintain its sovereignty, national identity, and diplomatic freedom of maneuver through a third neighbor policy." In an interview with the President in a documentary (titled "Mongolia – Democratic Anchor of the East"), Elbegdorj explained the same policy in details.

==== Nuclear-free status ====
Elbegdorj has committed Mongolia to be nuclear-free and a nuclear free world as a principal component of his foreign policy agenda. The United Nations Security Council recognized Mongolia's nuclear-weapon-free status on 17 September 2012 despite the fact that it cannot join one of the World's Nuclear-Weapon-Free-Zones, in part, because of the country's close proximity to nuclear-armed states Russia and China. Mongolia renounced nuclear materials and became a member of Organization for Security and Co-operation in Europe in 2013 and UN General Assembly's president Vuk Jeremic congratulated Elbegdorj for these.

Elbegdorj made international headlines in 2012 after being the first world leader invited to visit the Iranian nuclear facility in Natanz. After his visit, he stressed "the program has to be transparent to the world; in particular, the program must be under permanent supervision of the United Nations and the International Atomic Energy Agency. Iran's nuclear program must not endanger or cause threat to the interests and security of regional peace as well as of any other nation. Mongolia remains committed to safeguarding her nuclear free status, supported by the special UN resolutions. Mongolia will seek to contribute to securing universal peace by fully banning nuclear weapons in East Asia and the world at large."

Opposing to storing nuclear waste in Mongolia, Elbegdorj said "We ... firmly oppose to storing nuclear waste on Mongolian soil," in his speech at the High-Level Meeting on the Rule of Law of the 67th session of the United Nations General Assembly on 24 September 2012. Before, he noted it in his speech at the General Debate of the 66th session of the United Nations General Assembly on 21 September 2011.

==== Foreign investment policy ====
About foreign investment policy, Elbegdorj stated "I stand open to cooperate with responsible, transparent and law-obedient investors aligned with the development interests of Mongolia," in his inaugural address for his second term as the country's president on 10 July 2013.

Furthermore, while speaking about judicial reforms to protect domestic and foreign investors, Elbegdorj said "Our goal is to change it from a system that serves those in power to one that serves the public. It is important to note that when we say 'the people' we are also referring to our foreign investment partners."

The United States Senate passed Resolution Number 208 on the occasion of Elbegdorj's visit to the United States on 15 June 2011. The resolution title is "Expressing the sense of the Senate regarding Mongolian President Tsakhiagiin Elbegdorj's visit to Washington, D.C., and its support for the growing partnership between the United States and Mongolia." The resolution noted "Whereas on May 24, 2009, the people of Mongolia completed the country's fourth free, fair, and peaceful democratic election, which resulted in the election of opposition Democratic Party candidate Tsakhiagiin Elbegdorj." The Senate's resolution resolved "It is the sense of the Senate that Mongolian President Tsakhiagiin Elbegdorj's historic visit to Washington, D.C. cements the growing friendship between the governments and peoples of the United States and Mongolia; the continued commitment of the Mongolian people and the Government of Mongolia to advancing democratic reforms, strengthening transparency and the rule of law, and protecting investment deserves acknowledgment and celebration."

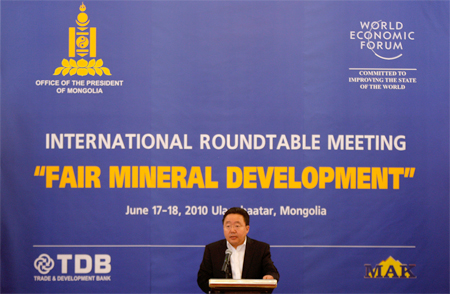
Elbegdorj speaking at "Fair Mineral Development" roundtable co-hosted by his office and the World Economic Forum in Ulaanbaatar on 17 June 2010

Elbegdorj initiated and co-hosted with the World Economic Forum "Fair Mineral Development" roundtable in Ulaanbaatar in June 2010. It was the first multi-stakeholder meeting in the mineral resource rich country focusing on determining the key stakeholders for negotiating mineral development agreements, and decision-making authorities in the licensing negotiation process; transparency issues in the negotiation process; issues related to land tenure, royalties and taxes; reopening and renegotiation of mineral agreements; dispute resolution mechanisms; and revenue distribution, work force and community development. With the World Economic Forum, Elbegdorj co-organized second roundtable "Responsible Mineral Development Initiative" in the Citizens' Hall under the Office of the President of Mongolia during the Mongolia Economic Forum on 3–4 March 2011. "More and more mineral development agreements are expected for Mongolia in this century," Elbegdorj noted in his opening remarks at this second roundtable. He highlighted "Supporting sustainable development and making the minerals sector beneficial to the people and the country's development, while working in good cooperation with foreign investors, and making the government's operations transparent to the public are some of the issues of utmost concern for countries such as ours."

==== Dinosaur fossil return ====
The auction of a nearly complete dinosaur's skeleton eight feet tall and 24 feet long rare Tarbosaurus T. bataar scavenged from Mongolia was announced at Heritage Auctions in New York City on 20 May 2012 with the asking price of one million dollars. Fossils found in Mongolia are the property of Mongolia and its people by law. Receiving a complaint from a Mongolian paleontologist, Elbegdorj promptly filed a lawsuit claiming the illegally smuggled skeleton from Mongolia in the United States Court through his American lawyer. Elbegdorj won the case with the professional help of internationally well known American and Mongolian paleontologists. The U.S. authorities handed the fossils to the Mongolian party in May 2013 after the case was resolved. The skeleton, returned to Mongolia along with other dinosaur fossils, was on public display at Sükhbaatar Square in Ulaanbaatar for a few months. This is the first lawsuit ever claimed abroad by a Mongolian president. The dinosaur fossil dealer pleaded guilty and faced a sentence of up to 17 years in prison in the USA.

=== Domestic policy ===
==== Anti-corruption ====
Elbegdorj's presidential actions have focused on advocating anti-corruption measures. "I sincerely believe that the true enemy of democracy and freedom is corruption ... The worst theft is corruption which damages people's common rights and liberties ... I am convinced that fighting corruption must be one of the most important duties of the Mongolian State today," Elbegdorj noted. Previously, during his two terms as a prime minister, he worked to uncover and eliminate several corruption scandals including his handling of the Erdenet Mining Corporation's embezzlement scandal in 1998, and his administration dug out the Customs chairman's corruption case in 2005. In September 2009 Elbegdorj replaced the Community Council of Independent Authority Against Corruption (IAAC) formed by former president Nambaryn Enkhbayar which included sports and music stars and supreme clergy while expressing his dissatisfaction with its investigation of petty corruption instead of political level corruption. He then reorganized the council with professional lawyers.

To create a dialogue among different stakeholders in the natural resources and mining community to stop corruption Elbegdorj opened a roundtable in Ulaanbaatar in collaboration with the World Economic Forum's Partnering Against Corruption Initiative (PACI) in March 2011. The meeting brought together top executives of Mongolian industries and NGOs to discuss anti-corruption initiatives in Mongolia. Moreover, he encouraged the parliament to take actions to prevent from corruption and jointly organized with the parliament's State Standing Committee and the International Institute for Democracy and Electoral Assistance "Policy Reform and the Funding of Political Activities" forum.

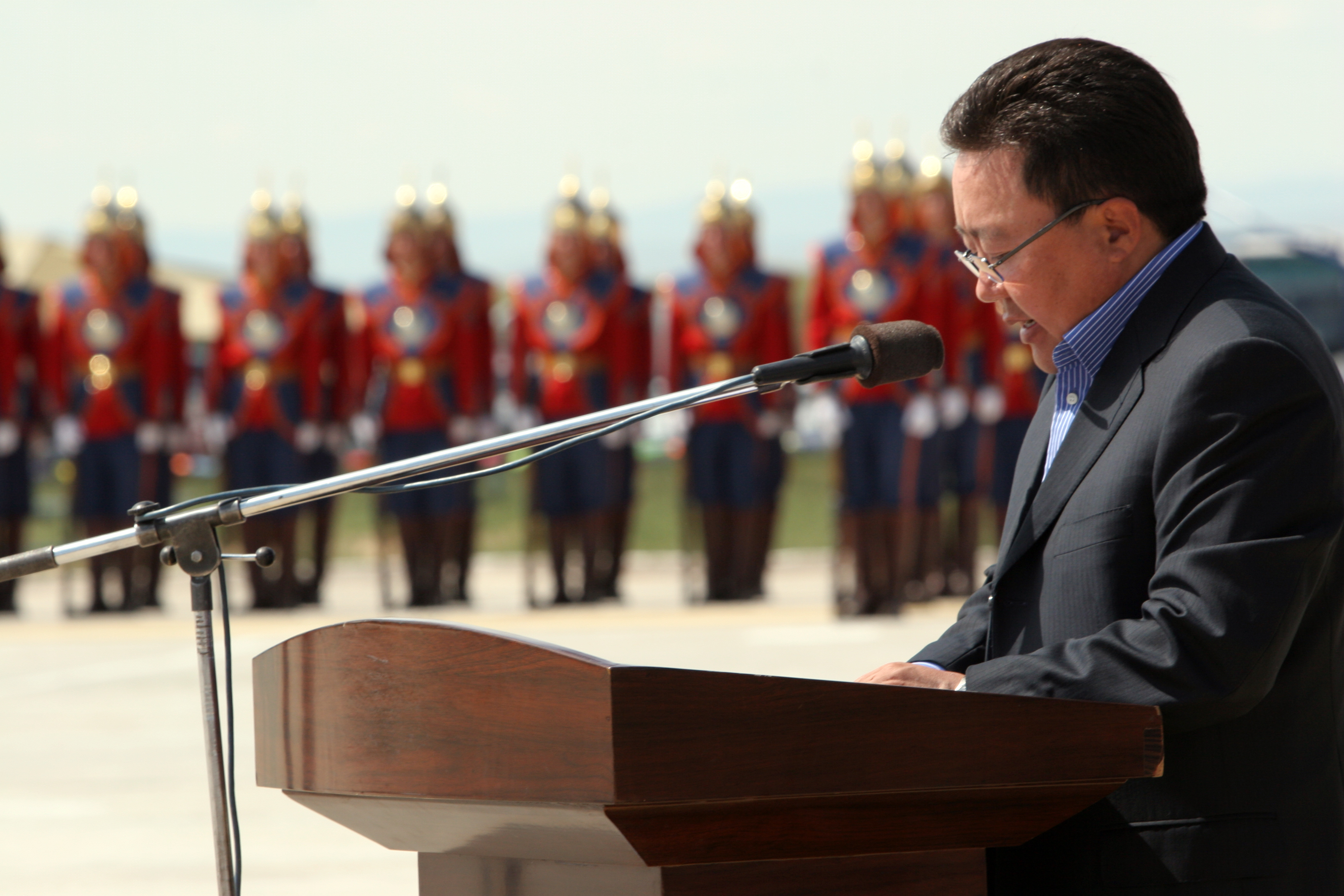
Tsakhiagiin Elbegdorj making a speech

Elbegdorj sees Chinggis Khaan (also referred to as Genghis Khan) as a leader from whom to learn for anti-corruption efforts. He said that Genghis Khan sought equal protection under the law for all citizens regardless of status or wealth. "Chinggis ... was a man who deeply realized that the justice begins and consolidates with the equality of law, and not with distinctions between people. He was a man who knew that good laws and rules lived longer than fancy palaces," Elbegdorj highlighted in his speech on the 850th anniversary of Chinggis Khaan's birth.

"The crime called corruption is committed by public servants, and not citizens," Elbegdorj pointed out at the High-Level Meeting on the Rule of Law of the 67th session of the United Nations General Assembly on 24 September 2012. "Today we put an end to ... amorality. We cannot afford to let Mongolia's future be tortured by corrupt officials for another year, another decade ... We must put an end to this," Elbegdorj pointed out in his first inaugural address. Thus under Elbegdorj's presidency, embezzlement and corruption cases amounting from millions to hundreds of millions of dollars, ranging from misappropriation of state properties and assets such as a printing factory, buildings, funds and taxes have been tried and the courts convicted high level statesmen including a former president of Mongolia, a former chairman of Mineral Resources Authority, ex-chairmen of state owned Mongolian Airlines MIAT and their allies. In addition, big scale corruption cases involving suspects such as former health and education ministers, former deputy chairman of Tax Authority are under investigation.

Mongolia's corruption perception ranking reduced by 26 places in one year from 2011 to 2012 comparing to the 120th place to the 94th according to Transparency International. U.S. Secretary of State Hillary Clinton applauded Elbegdorj and Mongolia on the country's democratic progress and efforts to end corruption in her speech at the International Women's Leadership Forum in Ulaanbaatar on 9 July 2012.

==== Judicial reform ====
By the Constitution of Mongolia, the president of Mongolia appoints the justices and judges of all levels of courts of Mongolia. Elbegdorj convened "Judicial Reform and Justice" Forum in Ulaanbaatar, Mongolia in April 2011. Mongolian parliament passed a package law on judicial reform submitted by Elbegdorj in 2011. Those laws were designed to ensure the impartiality of judges and justices and created a merit-based system for the selection of new judges and justices. In addition, the judicial reform allows citizens' representatives to participate in court hearings and trials and requires that all judicial decisions be placed on the Internet open to the public.

==== Environmental protection ====
The United Nations Environmental Programme awarded Elbegdorj as a Champion of the Earth for his commitment to environmental protection on 4 June 2012. U.N. Secretary General Ban Ki-moon highly appreciates Elbegdorj's contribution to the international community's efforts for ensuring sustainable development and keeping climate change issues under control, as he emphasized in his congratulatory note to Elbegdorj for his re-election as President of Mongolia on 2 July 2013. In addition, Elbegdorj worked as a member of the World Economic Forum's Global Agenda Council on Climate Change for the year of 2011.

Elbegdorj declared a day as Tree Planting Day by decree on 4 April 2010 and has been organizing a tree planting campaign around the country. On that day organizations and people plant trees to alleviate desertification in Mongolia. Many non-governmental organizations and social networks support Elbegdorj's call to plant trees. He ordered schools to have environmental subjects in schools' curricula. With support from his office, students began to plant and take care of trees they planted around their schools and television serials on planting trees have been broadcast. On 14 May 2011, Tree Planting Day, Mongolians planted two million trees. The event became a tradition of planting two million trees on every Tree Planting Day annually. In addition, his policy includes an environmentally friendly policy in the mining industry.

At the invitation of Elbegdorj, the World Economic Forum-Water Resources Group and Office of the President of Mongolia co-organized the Water Secure Future in Mongolia conference in Ulaanbaatar on 3 June 2011 in which over 100 government officials, parliamentarians, civil society and private sector representatives participated to find ways to safeguard Mongolia's scarce water resources in the context of its rapid economic growth. They discussed water use in the mining, agricultural and municipal sectors, shared case studies of international good practice for boosting water efficiency and ways of safeguarding Mongolia's water supplies. As a result, Elbegdorj and Peter Brabeck-Letmathe, Chairman of the World Economic Forum-Water Resources Group and Member of the World Economic Forum Foundation Board, committed to forming a Mongolian Water Alliance of key government entities, civil society representatives and private sector participants to support the transformation of Mongolia's water sector. Elbegdorj defined the purpose of the alliance by saying "Managing our future water needs is key to sustaining Mongolia's economic growth. We must ensure fast and effective implementation of our National Water Plan. We will benefit from the international networks and experience of the Water Resources Group to help us do so."

President Elbegdorj took part in the United Nations Climate Change Conference (COP21), in Paris, France. He delivered remarks at the Conference. Heads of State and Governments of 195 countries, and more than 50 thousand representatives of civil society and private sector have gathered for the Climate Change Conference which will be held in Le Bourget, from 30 November – 11 December 2015.

==== Smart Government ====
Elbegdorj introduced the Smart Government platform at the publicly broadcast event, "From A Big Government To A Smart Government" on 16 November 2013. Elbegdorj defines "smart government" as a combination of skilled people, technological advancements, research, and laws that all add up to creating a new mindset of how government must serve its citizens and enable (and not hinder) private sector development. The Smart Government program strives to reduce government involvement in business and economic matters, bolster property rights, modernize legal framework of the country, streamline the bureaucratic process, and combat corruption to further promote long-term sustainable growth in Mongolia. Shortly after its introduction, the Members of the Parliament of Mongolia expressed their "full and unwavering support of the goal to move to a smart government."

Elbegdorj's Smart Government Program has fifteen key initiatives as follows:

1. Enhance all government systems, policies and operations in conformity with the values of democracy and principles of market economy;
2. Ensure the integrity and cohesion of the state policies and actions;
3. Reform the organization, operations and processes of public service and institute accountability mechanisms at every level of the government;
4. Improve the capacities and efficiency of the public service;
5. Eliminate government participation in business activities;
6. Affirm our full and unwavering support of the goal to make political discourse immune to business influences;
7. Intensify the fight against corruption;
8. Support domestic industries;
9. Ensure economic growth by securing property rights and supporting the private sector;
10. Create government structures based on the rule of law and provide for inclusiveness, producing research-based decisions and services;
11. Instill the discipline to honour/implement contracts;
12. Support direct democracy, sovereignty of local governments and local development funds;
13. Create a long-term national development strategy and codify it by law;
14. Improve the election law;
15. Introduce information technologies to streamline and modernize government.

==== Supporting education ====
On 20 May 2013, Elbegdorj issued a decree that directed the government to provide financial support to Mongolian students to study at the world's top universities. By the implementation of the decree, Mongolian students accepted at the world's top 20 universities will receive funding from the government regardless of their major, and those accepted at the world's top 100 universities will be financed by the government if their major is included in the government's preferred profession list.

Elbegdorj vetoed a section of a law amendment that would have increased his salary; in return, he submitted a bill to the Parliament to give allowance as salary from the government to all Mongolian students studying in Mongolia. The law was passed and all Mongolian students studying at any university or college in Mongolia have received monthly allowances of 70,000 tugrugs since 2011 and the allowance may be increased to 96,000 tugrugs as per government decision in September 2013.

Elbegdorj was a member of the board of directors of the "Young Leader" foundation of Mongolia in 1992–2009 and a member of the director's board of the Mongolian Academy of Political Education in 1993–2009.

==== Campaign to stop alcoholism ====
Elbegdorj has been calling for a curb on the abuse of alcohol in Mongolia. Under his auspices and in collaboration with his office, civil society and non-governmental organizations organized many activities such as the Alcohol-Free Mongolia campaign, Elbegdorj banned the use of all alcoholic beverages at state dinners and state ceremonies under his name. Also he called upon government and its agencies not to serve alcohol at official ceremonies and functions. The World Health Organization awarded Elbegdorj its Regional Director's special recognition plaque. The award honours the public health leadership of a country leader and it is the first award for alcohol control in the Western Pacific Region.

==== Naming 3 millionth citizen ====
When Mongolia's population officially reached 3 million with the birth of a baby girl in Umnugobi province in February 2015, President Elbegdorj welcomed the news with a cheer, personally calling the parents to congratulate the new-born citizen. As a symbol of unity and harmony, Elbegdorj requested that the girl be named Mongoljin.

== Post-presidency ==
On 23 September 2022, during the Russian invasion of Ukraine and following the start of the Russian mobilization, Elbegdorj published a video address in YouTube, where he criticised the invasion and urged Russian president Vladimir Putin to "stop this senseless killing and destruction." He honoured Russians protesting against their government and instructed Russian draftees not to "shoot Ukrainians" and "kill that country". Elbegdorj also claimed that Buryats, Tuvans, and Kalmyks are "used as nothing more than cannon fodder", and that Mongolia is ready to shelter refugees fleeing Russia to avoid the military draft. He praised the "brave people" of Ukraine and President Volodymyr Zelenskyy.

In response to Vladimir Putin's usage of former administrative boundaries as a justification of the Russo-Ukrainian War, Elbegdorj tweeted "After Putin's talk, I found [a] Mongolian historic map", linking maps of modern-day Russia being included in the lands of the Mongol Empire. Included in his tweet was a humorous clarification that Mongolia would not invade Russia, because Mongolia is "a peaceful and free nation."

On 24 January 2023 in Washington, D.C., US, Elbegdorj participated in setting the Doomsday Clock at 90 seconds to midnight due to Russia's invasion of Ukraine and the increased risk of nuclear escalation. The Doomsday Clock's time is set by the Bulletin of the Atomic Scientists’ Science and Security Board and the Bulletin's Board of Sponsors including 10 Nobel Laureates. Elbegdorj said: "Today our world faces multiple crises. A common thread runs through them all: failure of leadership. We need a collective response rooted in the spirit and values of the UN Charter that can put us back on a pathway to peaceful co-existence and sustainable development."

On 31 August 2020, following the protests by Inner Mongolians against the Chinese authorities’ decision to replace their native Mongolian language in some school subjects with Chinese Mandarin in the Chinese autonomous region of Inner Mongolia, Elbegdorj voiced his support in media, and social media and YouTube.com. and wrote a letter to Chinese president Xi Jinping.

Since stepping down from the presidency, Elbegdorj has been vocal about Mongolia's future of democracy and a market economy.

According to emails released as part of the Epstein files, Elbegdorj met with Jeffrey Epstein multiple times.

== Family and personal life ==
Elbegdorj met Khajidsuren Bolormaa at a Mongolian students' party in Lviv, Ukraine when they were students. After their marriage in Ulaanbaatar, their first son was born in Lviv, Ukraine. They helped over 300 orphans through their Bolor Foundation. They adopted twenty children from the state-run Orphan Care Center (orphanage) in Ulaanbaatar after being the children's patrons for some time. Now they have twenty-five children: four sons of their own and twenty-one adopted children.

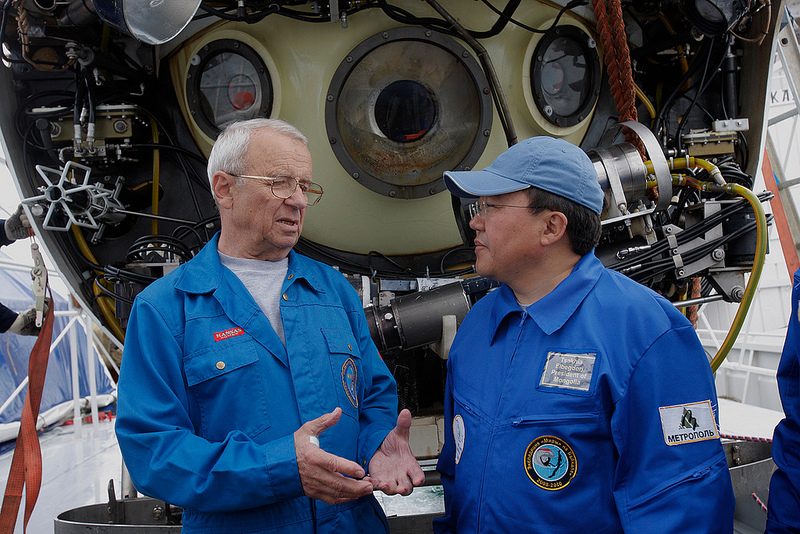
Elbegdorj talking to Anatoly Sagalevich after diving to the bottom of Lake Baikal in a submersible on 16 July 2010

Elbegdorj became the first president to dive to the bottom of the world's deepest lake, Baikal, in the Mir-1 mini-submersible on 16 July 2010.

Due to being president, in 2012 Elbegdorj asked his elder brother Arslandorj to give up his new position as a director of City Landscaping Department of Ulaanbaatar City though Arslandorj had worked there for more than 20 years before his brother's presidency. Long-time Democratic Party member Arslandorj quit his career at his brother's request. Arlsandorj is upset about stopping his professional career due to his brother's top political position. Arslandorj said: "As a brother, I followed to protect and helped Elbegdorj in difficult times, when Elbegdorj was facing life threatening risks during his co-organizing and co-leading the 1990 Mongolian democratic revolution." Arslandorj said that he would establish a private company specialized in his profession in future.

After Elbegdorj tweeted his job search in Mongolia for his eldest son Orgil (who had gotten a PhD. in medicinal chemistry from Virginia Commonwealth University in the United States), the son got a job at a private pharmaceutical company in Mongolia later. Elbegdorj's second son Erdene works in the Mongolian Armed Forces and served in the United Nations peacekeeping mission in South Sudan from March to November 2013.

== Awards and honors ==
Country or Institution	Award	Date
United Nations Environment Programme	Champions of the Earth - Policy Leadership	2012
Ukraine	Order of Prince Yaroslav the Wise (1st class)	29 June 2011
National Endowment for Democracy	New York Democracy Forum Presidential Medal	22 September 2011
Asia Society	Distinguished Statesmen Award	15 June 2011

=== Honorary degrees ===
Country	School	Degree	Date
Ukraine	Hetman Petro Sahaidachnyi National Ground Forces Academy	Honorary Doctorate	27 June 2011
Mongolia	Mongolian University of Science and Technology	Honorary Doctorate	10 March 2014
Japan	Ritsumeikan Asia Pacific University	Honorary Doctorate	22 May 2015
South Korea	Hankuk University of Foreign Studies	Honorary Doctorate	20 May 2016

Political offices
Preceded by Mendsaikhany Enkhsaikhan	Prime Minister of Mongolia; 1998	Succeeded by Janlavyn Narantsatsralt
Preceded by Nambaryn Enkhbayar	Prime Minister of Mongolia; 2004–2006	Succeeded by Miyeegombyn Enkhbold
Preceded by Nambaryn Enkhbayar	President of Mongolia; 2009–2017	Succeeded by Battulga Khaltmaa
