= 2013 Mongolian presidential election =

- 26 June 2013

Majority of the popular vote needed to prevent a run-off
- Turnout: 66.50 (▼7.09pp)
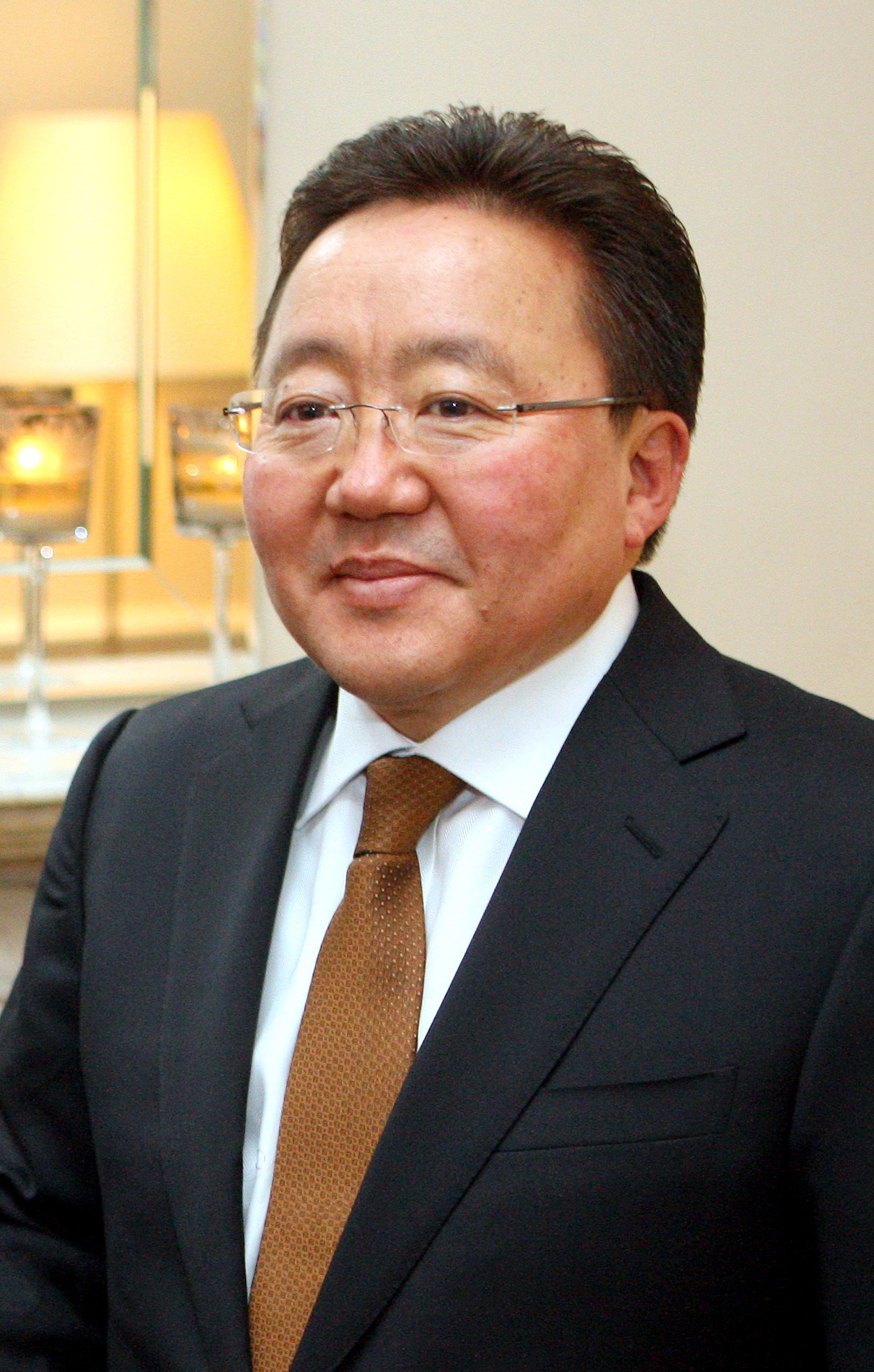

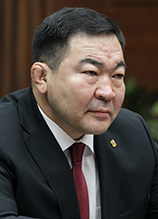

Nominee	Tsakhiagiin Elbegdorj	Badmaanyambuugiin Bat-Erdene	Natsagiin Udval
Party	Democratic	MPP	MPRP
Popular vote	622,794	520,380	80,563
Percentage	50.33%	42.05%	6.51%
- Results by province
President before election
Tsakhiagiin Elbegdorj
Democratic
Elected President
Tsakhiagiin Elbegdorj
Democratic

Presidential elections were held in Mongolia on 26 June 2013. The Democratic Party nominee, incumbent President Tsakhiagiin Elbegdorj was re-elected, defeating both Mongolian People's Party nominee of parliament member Badmaanyambuugiin Bat-Erdene and Mongolian People's Revolutionary Party nominee Natsagiin Udval, who was Minister of Health at the time of the election. Elbegdorj was inaugurated on 10 July 2013 for his second term in office.

Both Elbegdorj and Bat-Erdene saw backing from the urban population in Ulan Bator, Bat-Erdene having more of a conservative following and the incumbent president supported by the middle class. Elbegdorj won the election with 50.9% of the popular votes, a nearly 9% margin over Bat-Erdene. Udval received 6.6% of the popular vote. Elbegdorj's re-election kept the Democratic Party in power both in the presidency and the State Great Khural.

== Electoral system ==
The election was held using the two-round system. If no candidate had received a majority of the vote in the first round, a second round would have been held. The second round was to be scheduled on 10 July 2013 if necessary. Only parties with seats in the State Great Khural were allowed to nominate candidates.

The elections were the first in which Mongolians living abroad were allowed to vote, with an estimated 39,800 Mongolian citizens living outside Mongolia at the time of the election. Other reforms had been made since the 2012 parliamentary elections, including limits on money spent by candidates on campaigning and advertising. As in the 2012 elections, the presidential election used electronic voting machines from Dominion Voting Systems.

== Campaign laws ==
Changes to campaign laws were made in 2011 which restricted the amount of television and poster advertising a candidate could use. It also increased penalties for violators. The intent was to have the candidates judged on the merit of their platform rather than the budget of their campaign. This change increased the role of social networking such as Facebook and Twitter in candidates campaigns.

== Candidates ==
Three parties nominated candidates for the presidency.

=== Tsakhiagiin Elbegdorj ===
Incumbent president Tsakhiagiin Elbegdorj was renominated by Democratic Party, and was also endorsed by Civil Will-Green Party and Mongolian National Democratic Party, both of which have seats in both the parliament and the government cabinet. Republican Party and Motherland Party expressed their full support for Elbegdorj's candidacy also.

Elbegdorj was Prime Minister of Mongolia for two terms prior to his election as president in 2009. The incumbent president was "heavily backed by the urban middle class" of Ulaanbaatar. Elbegdorj was one of the leaders of the democratic revolution in 1990 that saw the fall of the People's Republic of Mongolia.

=== Badmaanyambuugiin Bat-Erdene ===
The opposition Mongolian People's Party nominated parliament member Badmaanyambuugiin Bat-Erdene. Bat-Erdene is a former wrestling champion and was the first wrestler to be announced as a presidential candidate in Mongolia. Bat-Erdene had a more conservative backing within Ulan Bator. Mongolian People's Party was the former communist party in power prior to the democratic revolution in 1990.

=== Natsagiin Udval ===
The Mongolian People's Revolutionary Party was initially unsure if it was going to field a candidate in the election, or support another party's candidate. It eventually nominated Natsagiin Udval to run. Udval is the Minister of Health and the Secretary-General of Mongolian People's Revolutionary Party. She was also the first woman to run for the presidency. Udval supports former president Nambaryn Enkhbayar who is in prison on corruption charges and who is chairman of Mongolian People's Revolutionary Party.

== Results ==
Incumbent President Elbegdorj won the election with 50.23% of total votes, with Baterdene Badmaanyambuu and Natsagiin Udval getting 41.97% and 6.5% respectively.

Following the announcement Mongolian Prime Minister Norovyn Altankhuyag pledged work with President Tsakhiagiin Elbegdorj to fight corruption in Mongolia. A political analyst said having the parliament and presidency represented by a single party would be good for foreign investment, as it shows a "politically stable" environment.

Candidate	Party	Votes	%
Tsakhiagiin Elbegdorj	Democratic Party	622,794	50.33
Badmaanyambuugiin Bat-Erdene	Mongolian People's Party	520,380	42.05
Natsagiin Udval	Mongolian People's Revolutionary Party	80,563	6.51
Blank votes		13,688	1.11
Total		1,237,425	100.00
Valid votes		1,239,784	100.00
Invalid votes		0	0.00
Total votes		1,239,784	100.00
Registered voters/turnout		1,864,273	66.50
Source: General Election Commission

=== By province ===
Subdivision	Tsakhiagiin Elbegdorj DP		Badmaanyambuugiin Bat-Erdene MPP		Natsagiin Udval MPRP	
Subdivision	Votes	%	Votes	%	Votes	%
Aimags of Mongolia
Arkhangai	15,688	44.13%	14,535	40.88%	4,615	12.98%
Bayan-Ölgii	18,839	53.34%	13,297	37.65%	2,240	6.34%
Bayankhongor	16,134	48.37%	14,725	44.15%	1,986	5.95%
Bulgan	10,023	40.03%	12,075	48.23%	2,577	10.29%
Govi-Altai	9,731	41.57%	11,218	47.92%	2,199	9.39%
Dornogovi	9,842	37.85%	13,880	53.38%	1,866	7.18%
Govisümber	2,664	42.17%	3,111	49.25%	436	6.90%
Dornod	16,098	53.06%	11,798	38.89%	1,886	6.22%
Dundgovi	6,401	36.43%	9,455	53.81%	1,524	8.67%
Zavkhan	15,530	49.24%	14,728	46.69%	960	3.04%
Övörkhangai	21,012	46.12%	20,808	45.67%	2,876	6.31%
Ömnögovi	11,502	45.93%	11,181	44.64%	2,179	8.70%
Sükhbaatar	10,290	39.58%	14,168	54.49%	962	3.70%
Selenge	20,377	47.15%	17,900	41.42%	4,233	9.79%
Töv	14,848	39.39%	19,165	50.84%	2,971	7.88%
Uvs	15,402	46.17%	15,299	45.87%	2,066	6.19%
Khovd	20,144	61.17%	10,562	32.08%	1,765	5.36%
Khövsgöl	27,056	52.28%	20,827	40.24%	3,106	6.00%
Khentii	10,156	33.37%	19,019	62.50%	776	2.55%
Darkhan-Uul	20,474	50.02%	17,248	42.14%	2,785	6.80%
Orkhon	22,084	51.50%	16,274	37.95%	4,092	9.54%
Düüreg of Ulaanbaatar
Khan-Uul	31,870	54.23%	22,883	38.94%	3,413	5.81%
Baganuur	5,685	46.69%	5,880	48.29%	475	3.90%
Bagakhangai	791	45.07%	894	50.94%	53	3.02%
Bayanzürkh	70,763	55.01%	49,777	38.70%	6,822	5.30%
Nalaikh	7,559	50.04%	6,078	40.24%	1,262	8.35%
Sükhbaatar	33,366	54.91%	23,681	38.97%	3,157	5.20%
Chingeltei	38,614	53.73%	28,130	39.14%	4,318	6.10%
Bayangol	49,903	57.08%	32,158	36.78%	4,702	5.38%
Songino Khairkhan	67,209	53.86%	48,343	38.74%	8,079	6.47%
Overseas	2,739	64.57%	1,283	30.25%	182	4.29%
National Total	622,794	50.23%	520,380	41.97%	80,563	6.50%

== Reaction ==
U.S. President Barack Obama issued a statement on presidential election in Mongolia on 27 June 2013, the same day of the result of 2013 Mongolian presidential election was announced. In his statement, President Obama noted: "President Elbegdorj has been an important leader in advancing democracy and freedom in his country and a key partner for the United States in Asia and globally...Through its impressive democratic achievements and its progress on economic liberalization, Mongolia serves as a significant example of positive reform and transformation for peoples around the world."

Vuk Jeremić, President of the United Nations General Assembly for the 67th session expressed a satisfaction with the fair and successful election in his congratulations to Elbegdorj. United Nations Secretary General Ban Ki-moon congratulated for successful presidential election in Mongolia in his congratulatory message to Elbegdorj for his re-election as President of Mongolia.

In his congratulatory note to Elbegdorj on his victory, European Commission President José Manuel Barroso highlighted "The European Commission considers that the presidential election has become another vital step of the Mongolian people to establish a democratic society that respects the rule of law and human rights." German Chancellor Angela Merkel noted "The Organization for Security and Co-operation in Europe sent its group to Mongolia for the first time to observe the Presidential election, and it was an expression of strengthening of democracy and transparency in Mongolia", in her congratulatory message to Elbegdorj for his re-election as President of Mongolia.
