= Fradkin Brothers Furniture =

Defunct furniture retailer in Baltimore County, Maryland, US

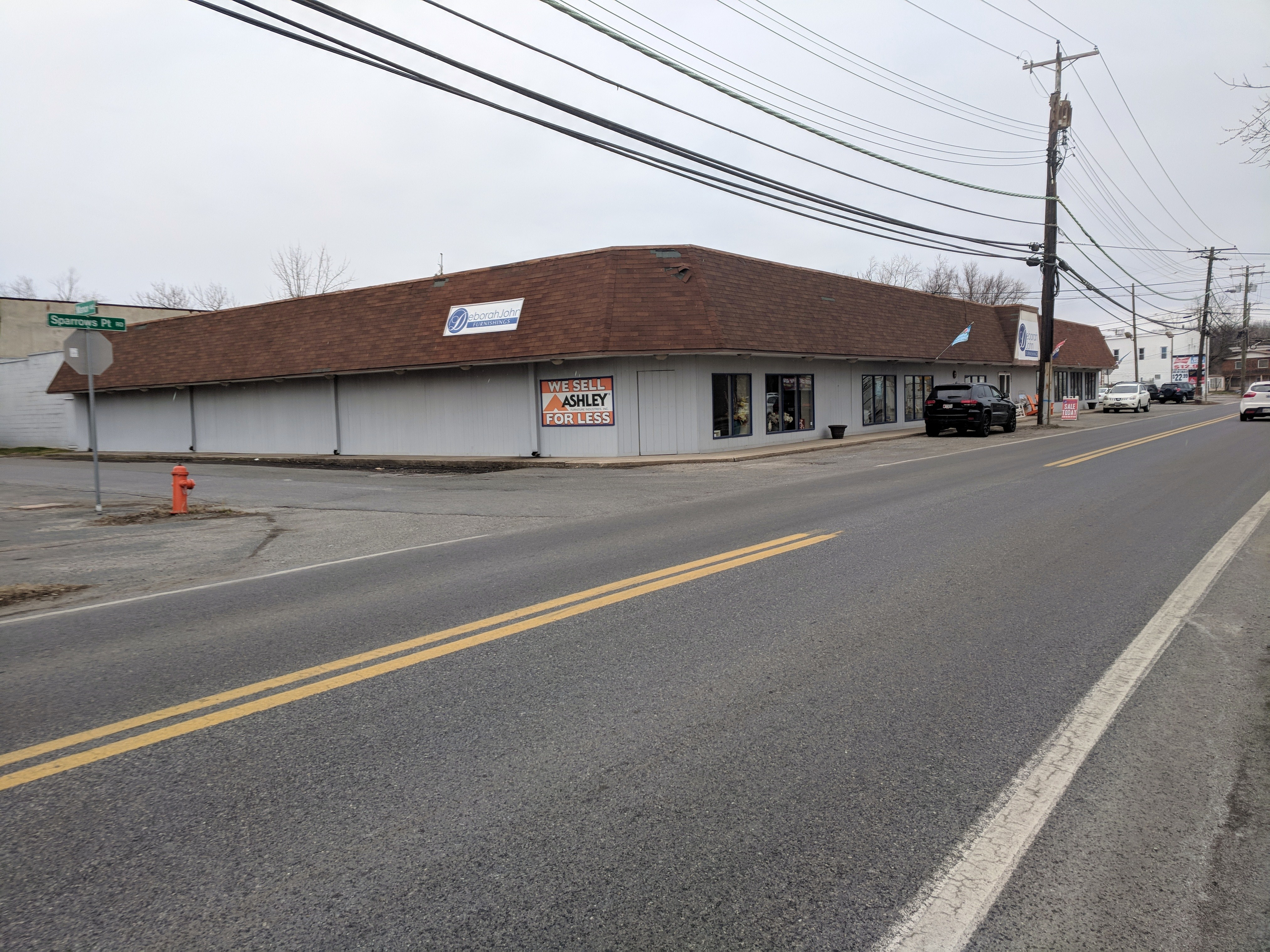
The former Fradkin Brothers building, now operating as Deborah John Furnishing, in Edgemere, Maryland

Fradkin Brothers Furniture was a furniture retailer in Baltimore County, Maryland. It was part of the Sparrows Point community from 1921 until the final quarter of the 20th century. Morris I. Fradkin was the owner and operator of Fradkin Brothers Furniture until he died on October 26, 1954. Morris Fradkin was a Russian Jew who immigrated to Baltimore in 1906. Baltimore's furniture retail businesses have historically been owned and operated by Jewish families. Morris Fradkin passed his business and estate to his two sons, Robert and Stanley Fradkin. Morris Fradkin's sons continued the family business and even expanded the store to two additional locations in 1974, Riverdale and Rt. 40. The original Sparrows Point store closed in the final quarter of the 20th century.
