= Lucy Fradkin =

American artist (born 1953)

- Born: 1953 (age 72–73); Brooklyn, New York, U.S.
- Education: self-taught
- Known for: Portraits, collage, genre painting, and works on paper
- Awards: Marie Walsh Sharpe Foundation (2011); Pollock Krasner Grant (2009); Gottlieb Foundation Grant (2007); New York Foundation for the Art Fellowships (2005, 1995)
- Website: http://lucyfradkin.com/home.html

Lucy Fradkin (born 1953) is an American self-taught artist from New York who paints portraits which often include collage elements. She is inspired by Persian and Indian miniature paintings with bright palettes and flattened space as well as the ancient frescoes and mosaics of Etruria, Rome, and Byzantium. In addition, she visited the Brooklyn Museum as a young artist with her mother and was inspired by The Dinner Party by Judy Chicago, as a prominent piece of art by a living woman artist.

== Biography ==
=== Early life ===
Lucy Fradkin was born in Brooklyn, New York. She was raised in Port Washington, on Manhasset Bay, on the north shore of Long Island. She spent many formative years in southern Vermont. Since the early 1990s, travels to other cultures have had a profound influence on her studies and artwork. She has found great inspiration from the art of ancient and indigenous cultures of Latin America, Italy and Greece. In 2002-2003, she spent a year living, working, exhibiting and lecturing in Italy. Based in Rome, she was able to travel extensively around the country further informing her work through a visual immersion into the art of ancient worlds.

== Collections ==
Fradkin's work has been represented within the permanent collection of notable galleries and museums including: "Lucy Fradkin, Home is Where the Heart is" at the Nancy Margolis Gallery, New York, 2012. She is included in the Viewing Program Artist Registry at The Drawing Center, New York; and her work "I Wish It Would Rain" was purchased by the Weatherspoon Art Museum, at the University of North Carolina at Greensboro, for their Dillard Collection of Art on Paper. Her work is in the University Hospitals Art Collection.

Fradkin's works "An Awakening To Other Orders of Reality" and "Birds of a Feather" are in the private collection of Agnes Gund, President Emerita of the Museum of Modern Art (MoMA) and were included in the movie "Aggie".

=== Notable works ===
Notable among Fradkin's works are “Arthur Dreams of India” 2014, and “An Awakening To Other Orders Of Reality”, 2010.

Like many of Fradkin's pieces, these paintings feature a full-frontal portrait of either an archetypal or actual individual. The subjects stand in the center of spaces that are described with flattened tiled floors or rugs, and patterned wall papers or curtains. Objects sit, hang and float in these spaces and interact with the figures both abstractly as well as pictorially, resulting in an intimate visual narrative.

Fradkin's husband, the Jamaican-born artist Arthur Simms, features in many of Frandin's paintings, most notably “Arthur Dreams of India”. Included in the 2016 Outwin Boochever Portrait Exhibition at the National Portrait Gallery (United States), this work in acrylic gouache, collage, pencil, and metallic thread on paper, has a flat, folk sensibility. In this portrait, Fradkin has drawn on the traditions of Indian miniature painting to honor Arthur's mother, Icema, who, like others from Jamaica, might have been of Indian descent.

“An Awakening To Other Orders of Reality” (acrylic gouache on paper with collage and pencil) currently in the private collection of Agnes Gund, was included in the film Aggie. In this painting, two trays, one with a floral pattern and one with a portrait, are stacked behind and haloed around the head of the main figure. On either side of this totem are two squares that make window shapes and silhouette a house plant frond on one side and a Red-tailed Hawk on the other. An abundance of detail in the midst of "simply" rendered figures allows us to focus, play and ponder all the possible associations and rhythmic patterns between the various elements in the paintings.

== Exhibitions ==
Fradkin's work in portraiture has won significant critical attention. She was a three-time finalist for the Outwin Boochever Portrait Competition at the Smithsonian Institution National Portrait Gallery (United States) in Washington, DC (2016, 2013, 2006).

Her portraits were included in the 2008-2009 exhibition "As Others See Us: The Contemporary Portrait" at the Brattleboro Museum and Art Center, Brattleboro, VT. Frandkin's work was the subject of articles and reviews of the exhibition.

The Nicolaysen Art Museum, Casper, WY, had a solo show of Lucy Fradkin's work in 2008-2009, which included the notable work "Teatime With Arthur" (2005).

"Lucy Fradkin: A Brief History of Fashion and Friendship" (Kenise Barnes Fine Art, 2000) was the subject of a December 17, 2000, The New York Times Arts & Entertainment review.

=== Exhibitions list ===
2021
Tenacity, Chautaqua Institution, Chautaqua, NY
7 Years, La Nueva FÁBRICA, Antigua, Guatemala (postponed)
2020
Still Utopia:Islands, MC Gallery, New York, NY
2019
New Work by Lucy Fradkin, Alleghany Meadows and Trey Hill, Harvey Preston Gallery; Aspen, Colorado
Every Woman Biennial, La Mama Galleria, New York, NY
2018
Untitled, Miami, Steve Turner Gallery, Miami, FL
Inside Out, Steve Turner, Los Angeles, CA
American Portraiture Today, The Baker Museum, Naples, FL
American Portraiture Today, Ackland Art Museum, Chapel Hill, NC
2017
American Portraiture Today, Kemper Museum of Contemporary Art, Kansas City, MO
American Portraiture Today, Tacoma Art Museum, Tacoma, WA
American Portraiture Today, Art Museum of South Texas, Corpus Christi, TX
Whitney Houston Biennial, 325 West Broadway New York, NY
2016
American Portraiture Today, Smithsonian Institution National Portrait Gallery (United States), Washington, DC
David Kimball Anderson, Elizabeth Ferrill, Lucy Fradkin & Michaelene Walsh, Harvey/Meadows Gallery, Aspen, CO
2014
Lucy Fradkin and Arthur Simms: Intimate Worlds, Holter Museum of Art, Helena, MT
Art on Paper, Weatherspoon Art Museum, Greensboro, NC
Rule of the Law, Athens School of Fine Arts Gallery, Athens, Greece
Flowering, Nancy Margolis Gallery, New York, NY
2013
Outwin Boochever Portrait Competition, Smithsonian Institution National Portrait Gallery, Washington, DC
Come Together: Surviving Sandy, Industry City, Brooklyn, NY
Congregation Annotated, 106 Green Gallery, Brooklyn, NY
Lucy Fradkin: Going To A Go-Go, “Harvey/Meadows Gallery, Aspen, CO
Lucy Fradkin Even Cowgirls Get the Blues, The Bellarmine Museum of Art (now Fairfield University Art Museum), Fairfield, CT
2012
Lucy Fradkin-Home Is Where The Heart Is, Nancy Margolis Gallery New York, NY
Lucy Fradkin and Roxa Smith, Kenise Barnes Fine Art, Larchmont, NY
2011
Lucy Fradkin, Tony Marsh, Sun Koo Yuh, Harvey/Meadows Gallery, Aspen, CO
Rock, Paper, Scissors, Clark Gallery, Lincoln, MA
2010
Lucy Fradkin, Family Tree, Nancy Margolis Gallery New York, NY (solo)
It's A Wonderful 10th, Sideshow Gallery, Brooklyn, NY
2009
Lucy Fradkin Terra Cotta, Terra Firma, Clark Gallery, Lincoln, MA (solo)
Summer At The Paramount, Mulry Fine Art, Palm Beach, FL
Party At Chris's House JANET KURNATOWSKI GALLERY Brooklyn, NY
Flower Power, Clark Gallery Lincoln, MA
2008–2009
Lucy Fradkin Nicolayson Museum, Casper, WY (solo)
As Others See Us, Brattleboro Museum and Art Center, Brattleboro, VT
2008
Lucy Fradkin Terra Cotta, Terra Firma, Clark Gallery, Lincoln, MA
Family Portrait, Gallery San Angel, San Antonio, TX
Fifteen Artists Address The Issue Of Love, Harvey/Meadows Gallery, Aspen, CO
Rock, Scissors, Paper, Mulry Fine Art, West Palm Beach, FL
2007
Lucy Fradkin: Works on Paper, Harvey/Meadows Gallery, Aspen, CO (solo)
Intricate Simplicity, Lucy Fradkin, Gallery San Angel, San Antonio, TX (solo)
Lucy Fradkin, Lesley Heller Gallery, New York, NY (solo)
Sugar Buzz, Lehman College of Art Gallery, Bronx, NY
2006
Outwin Boochever Portrait Competition, Smithsonian Institution National Portrait Gallery, Washington, DC
3rd Wave, BAC Gallery Brooklyn, NY
Art Bar Artists, Art Bar Gallery, Ithaca, NY
Winter Salon, Lesley Heller Gallery, New York, NY
A Thing of Beauty, Kenise Barnes Fine Art, Larchmont, NY
2005
Lucy Fradkin, Untold Stories” Kenise Barnes Fine Art Larchmont, NY (solo)
2004
Roman Holiday-New Work From A Year Spent In Rome-Lucy Fradkin and Arthur Simms, Kenise Barnes Fine Art (solo)
ART Larchmont, NY (solo)
2003
Lucy Fradkin-Spring Line, American Academy in Rome, Rome, Italy (solo)

== Personal life ==
Fradkin is married to the Jamaican-born sculptor Arthur Simms.
