= 2009 Mongolian presidential election =

- 24 May 2009
- Turnout: 73.59% (▼1.39pp)
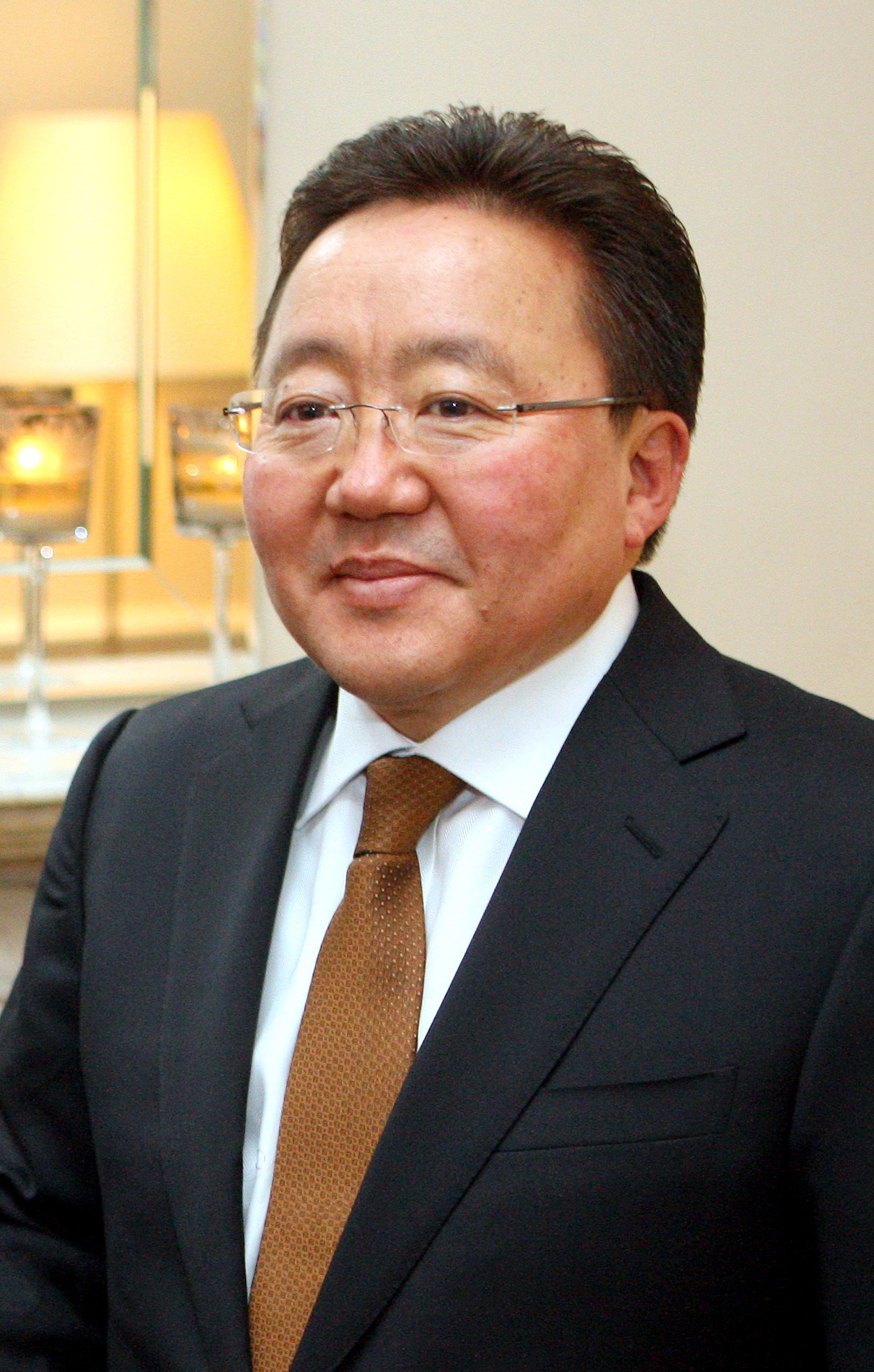

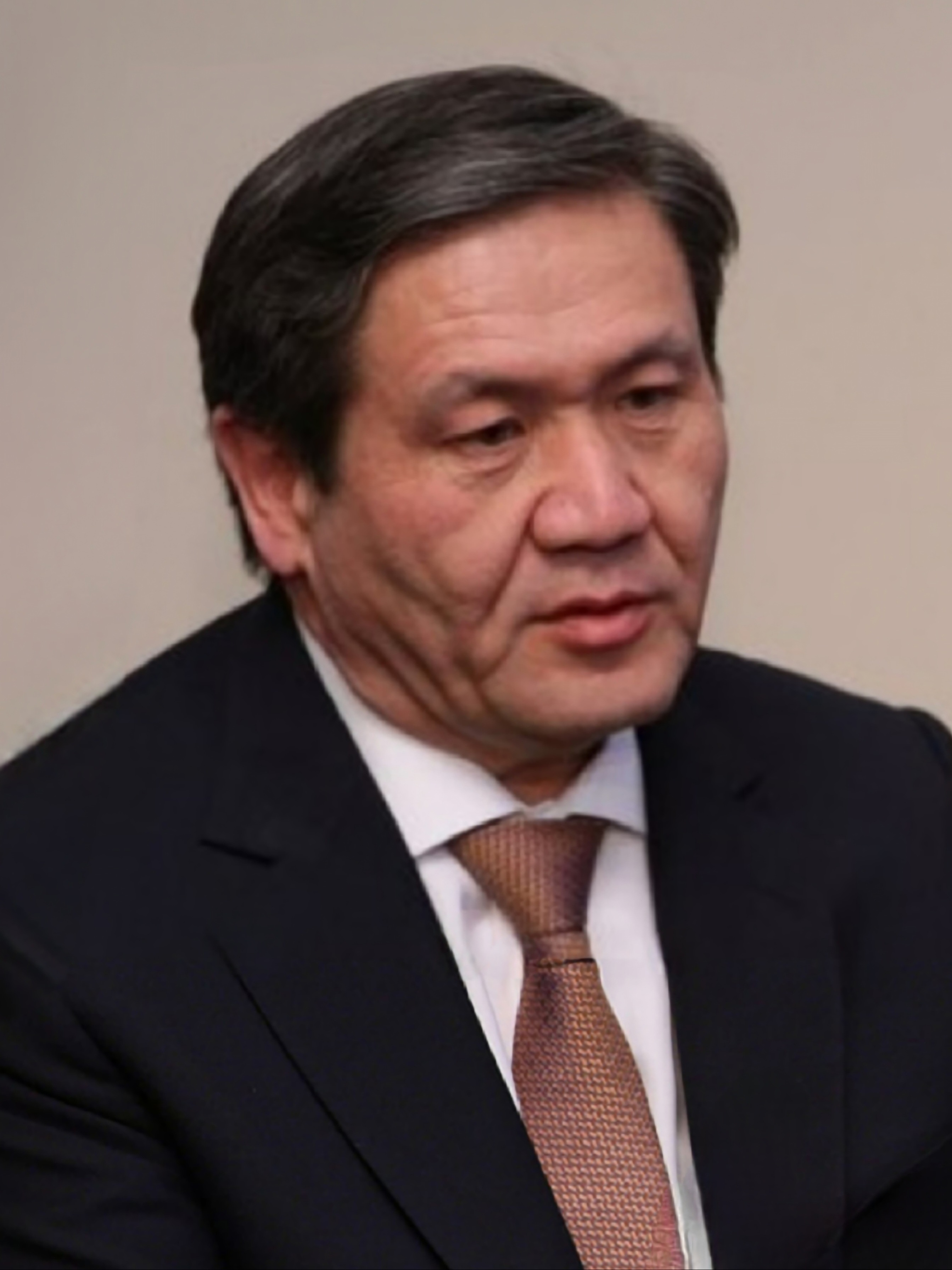
Nominee	Tsakhiagiin Elbegdorj	Nambaryn Enkhbayar
Party	Democratic	MPRP
Popular vote	562,718	520,948
Percentage	51.85%	48.00%
- Results by province
President before election
Nambaryn Enkhbayar
MPP
Elected President
Tsakhiagiin Elbegdorj
Democratic

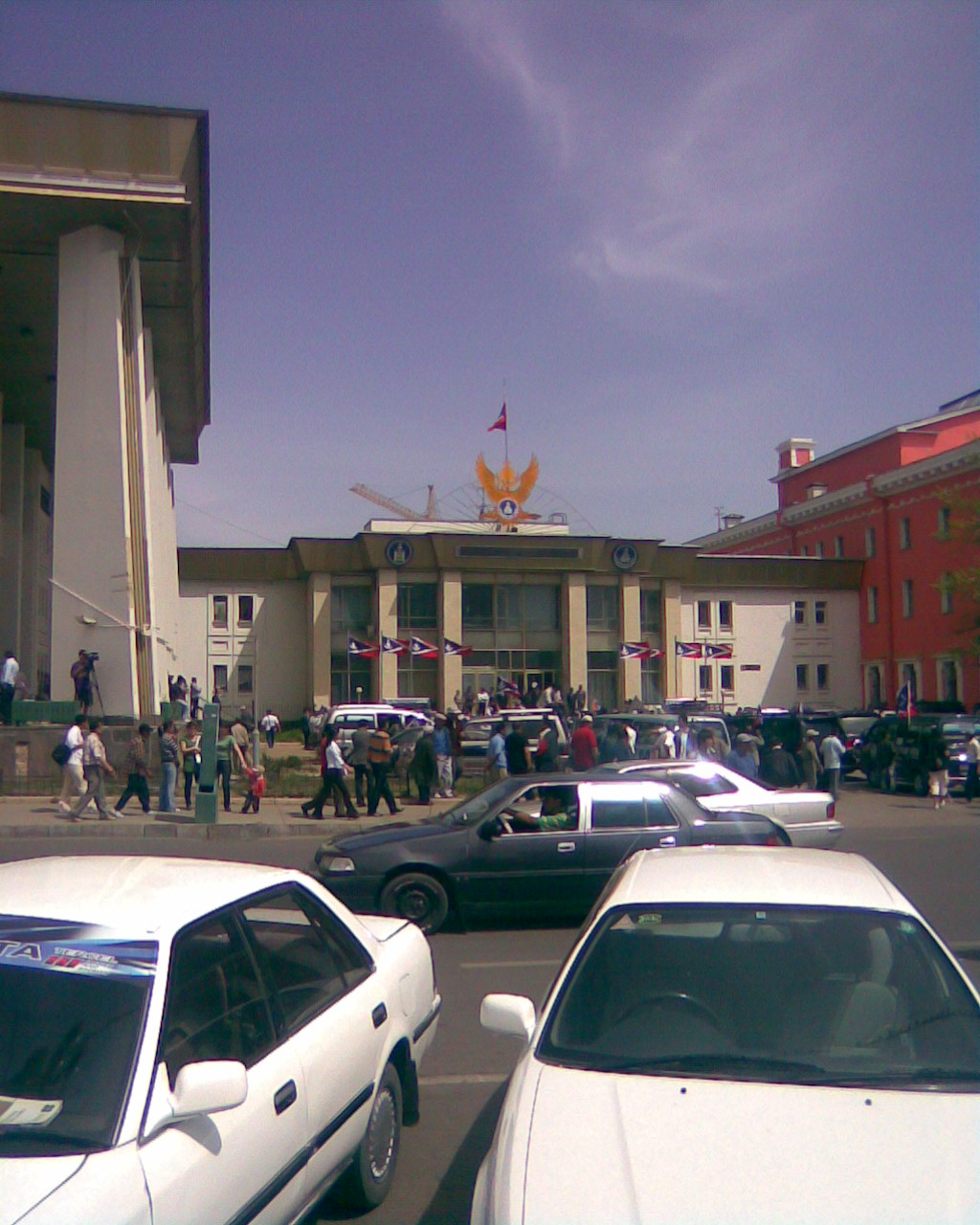
Democratic Party Headquarters after results are announced

Presidential elections were held in Mongolia on 24 May 2009. They were contested between incumbent Nambaryn Enkhbayar, supported by the Mongolian People's Revolutionary Party, and Tsakhiagiin Elbegdorj, who had support of the Democratic Party and the opposition parties. Elbegdorj declared himself the victor before the count was official but based on his party's counts. Enkhbayar admitted a narrow defeat shortly after and said that he would respect the results, marking the second time an incumbent president had lost their bid for re-election - following Punsalmaagiin Ochirbat in the 1997 election.

== Background ==
There had been fears that a close result could lead to civil unrest as happened in the 2008 legislative election, where allegations of vote rigging had sparked street protests and clashes with the police during which five people lost their lives and hundreds were injured. Although, police and army units were on stand-by to contain any protest, the people seemed satisfied with the report of the election monitors in that there was no finding of fraudulent votes.

== Candidates ==
Presidential candidates were only allowed from parties which had representation in the State Great Khural. The eligible parties were the Mongolian People's Revolutionary Party (MPRP), Democratic Party, Civic Will Party and Mongolian Green Party. The MPRP fielded the incumbent president Nambaryn Enkhbayar as its presidential candidate. The Democratic Party chose former prime minister Tsakhiagiin Elbegdorj as their candidate. The Civic Will and Green parties did not field a candidate and instead chose to support Tsakhiagiin Elbegdorj, the Democratic Party's candidate, thus providing the electorate with a choice between the incumbent or a candidate supported by all of the opposition parties.

Elbegdorj, who served twice as prime minister, campaigned on a theme of anti-corruption and a need for change which proved popular in urban areas. Both candidates' campaigns were dominated by the issue of how Mongolia's mineral wealth should be distributed.

== Results ==
Candidate	Party	Votes	%
Tsakhiagiin Elbegdorj	Democratic Party	562,718	51.85
Nambaryn Enkhbayar	Mongolian People's Revolutionary Party	520,948	48.00
Votes for both candidates		749	0.07
Blank votes		938	0.09
Total		1,085,353	100.00
Valid votes		1,085,353	98.77
Invalid votes		13,522	1.23
Total votes		1,098,875	100.00
Registered voters/turnout		1,493,217	73.59
Source: General Election Commission

The United States Senate passed Resolution number 192 supporting Mongolia's democracy and economic development and noting Elbegdorj's election victory on the day he was sworn in on 18 June 2009.
