= 2022 Mongolian protests =

Protests against government corruption

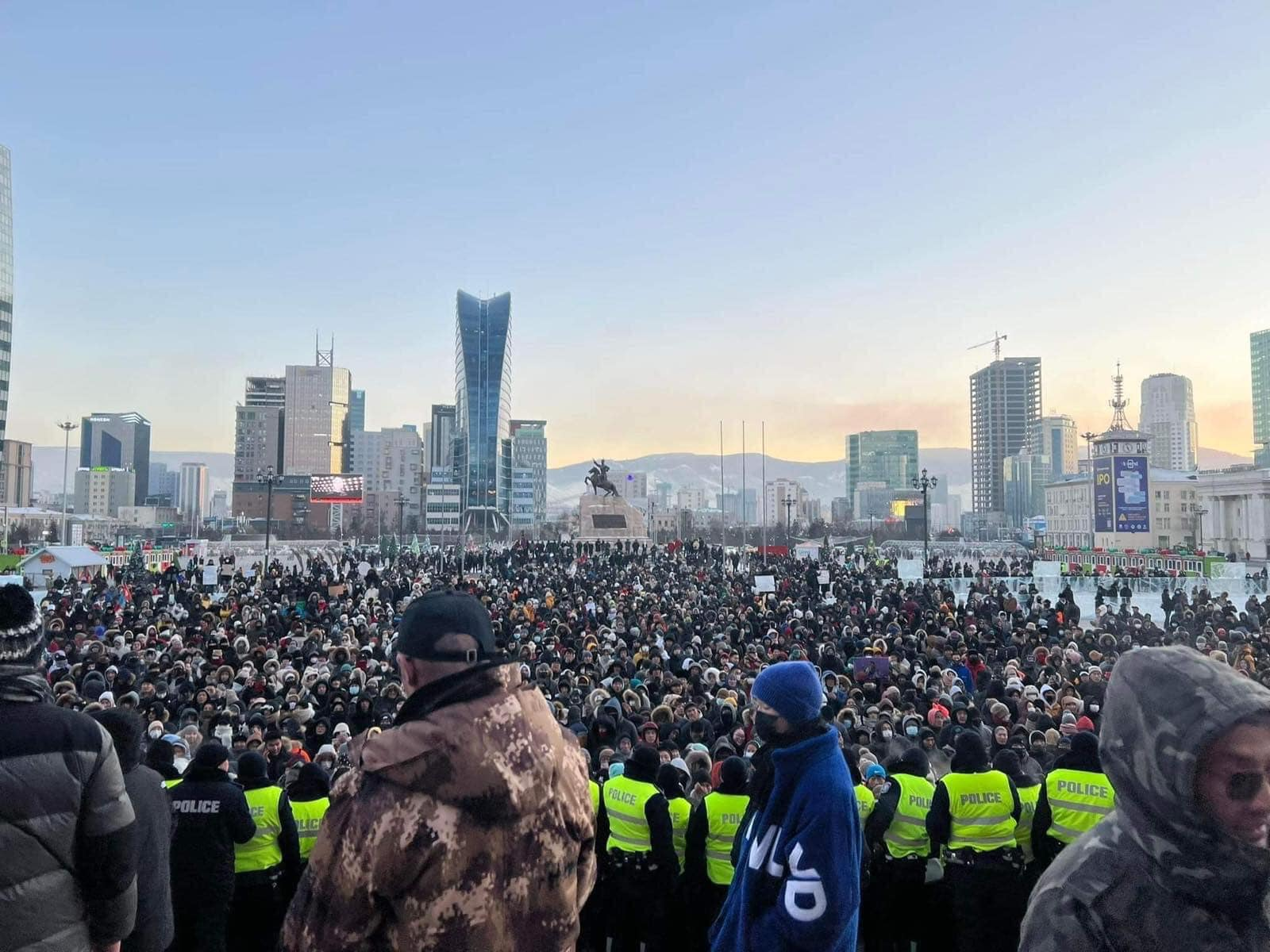
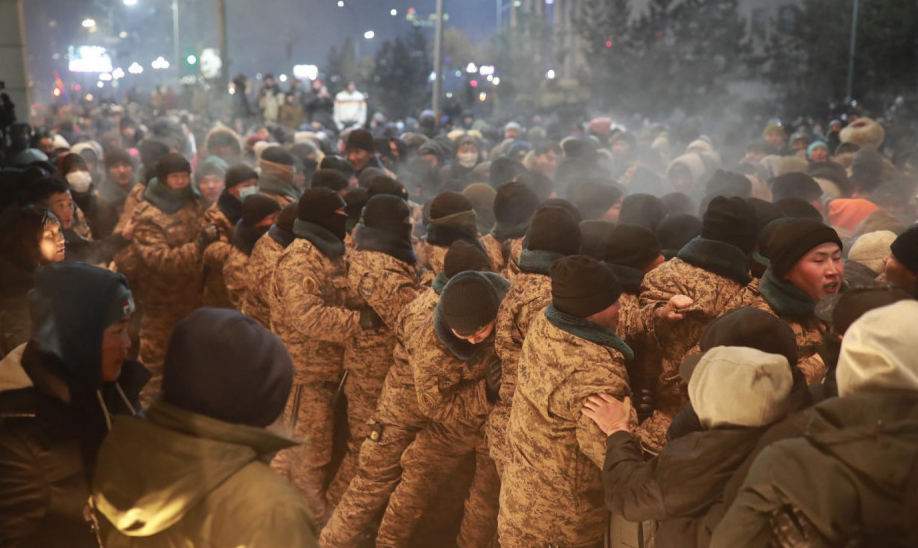
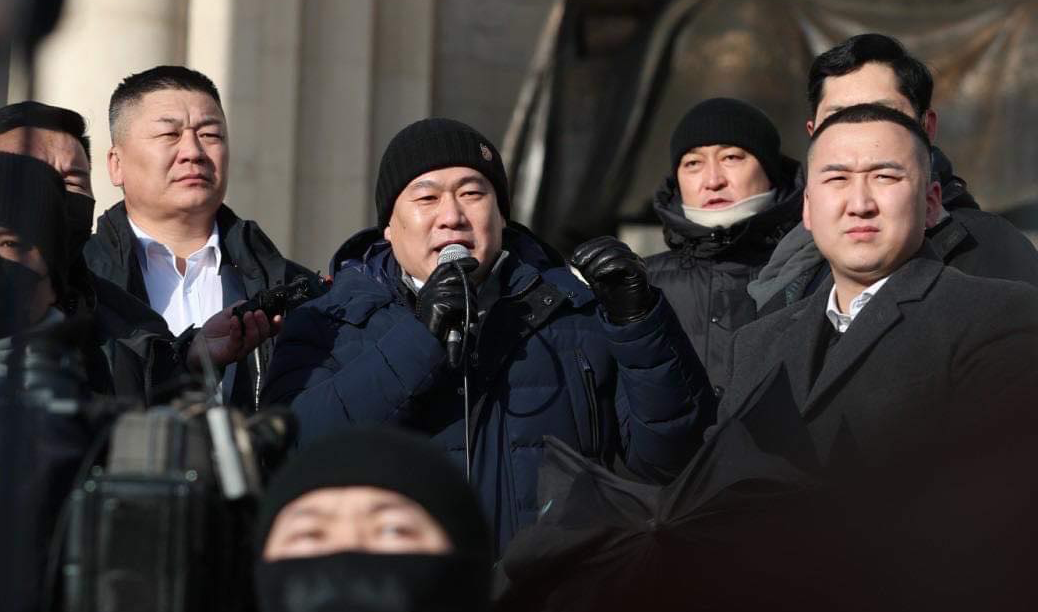
- Clockwise from top left Protests outside the Government Palace on 4 December; Prime Minister Luvsannamsrain Oyun-Erdene addressing a crowd on 7 December; Protestors attempting to storm the Government Palace on 5 December
- Date: 4 December 2022 – 1 January 2023 (4 weeks)
- Location: Mongolia
- Caused by: Coal theft; Corruption; Dissatisfaction with the Mongolian government; Economic crisis; Inflation
- Goals: Punishment of corrupt government officials; Government resignation and legal reform
- Methods: Demonstrations; Online activism; Rioting; Civil disobedience
- Status: A parliamentary working group was formed and held a public hearing on 21 December 2022.; Multiple senior officials and business executives, including former ETT CEO Battulgyn Gankhuyag, were arrested following the protests.; In late 2023–2024, legal reforms expanded anti-corruption powers, including harsher sentences and enhanced asset confiscation provisions.; Erdenes Tavan Tolgoi was placed under a special state regime; plans were made to take it public and shift coal sales to transparent auction systems.; Heightened civic pressure led to more frequent public financial disclosures and independent oversight initiatives.; As of mid‑2025, investigations are still ongoing. Several officials have been convicted, though many cases remain before the courts.

Parties
Protesters (no central leadership)	Government of Mongolia; Erdenes Tavantolgoi; Ministry of Justice and Internal Affairs; National Police Agency; Internal Troops; Mongolian People's Party

Number
~5,000	~100 (as of 4 December)

Casualties and losses
~30 protestors injured	13 police officers and internal troops injured

Mass protests began in the Mongolian capital Ulaanbaatar on 4 December 2022. The protests were sparked by public anger towards a corruption scandal involving the theft of $12.9 billion worth of coal by government officials and politicians.

The Government of Mongolia had met with the protesters and promised to investigate the affairs. An investigation committee was announced by the State Great Khural and several officers suspected of coal theft were arrested. A public hearing was held on 21 December 2022. Mongolian authorities also announced plans to reform the state-owned mining firm Erdenes Tavantolgoi to combat corruption.

== Background ==
Local media reported that the cause of civil discontent was the involvement of many politicians in the theft of export coal. According to unofficial data, about 6.5 million tons of coal were allegedly stolen from Mongolia, and exported to China. It is also noted that in China, those involved in the theft of coal from Mongolia were executed and sent a list with the names of Mongolian officials involved in this case. The protesters demanded that their names be announced. Khishgeegiin Nyambaatar, Minister of Justice and Internal Affairs of Mongolia, said that the government had applied through diplomatic channels to the Beijing authorities for cooperation with the Chinese prosecutor's office investigating the case of coal theft.

As noted, Mongolia exports up to 86 per cent of its goods to China, with more than half of this volume accounted for by coal. The value of coal exports from Mongolia jumped to $4.5 billion in the first 9 months of 2022.

Significant price discrepancies between coking coal sold in Mongolia (~$70 per ton), China (~$140 a ton) and the international market (~$300 per ton) are the main source of the alleged wrongdoing.

== Protests ==
=== 4 December ===
In −16 °C conditions, protesters gathered outside the Government Palace in Ulaanbaatar on 4 December and demanded the names of officials who are said to have embezzled 44 trillion ($12.8 billion) in Mongolian tögrög (MNT) state coal export revenues over the past two years. According to local media, around 5000 people gathered in Sükhbaatar Square. Several protesters held national flags and placards saying "Stop robbing the people", and "Stop eating and thinking about my future". Along with the organisers, a significant number of protestors went to the Ikh Tenger Complex, a state-protected area where the residences of the President, the Prime Minister, and the Speaker are located.

By 8:20 PM, approximately a hundred police officers and internal troops with shields were present in front of the parliament building. After a two-hour standoff on the stairs to the building entrance, the protestors dispersed to continue their protest the next day and, through social media, urged people to strike and join the protest. Several hundred demonstrators decided to continue the protest on Monday, saying they would "go all the way."

In the third-largest city, Darkhan, protestors demanded that the names of the coal thieves be announced and that their property be confiscated. Demonstrators marched through the city, chanting slogans including "Unite Against Thieves." They stated that the rights and freedoms of citizens, enshrined in the Constitution, are being increasingly limited, and their lives are deteriorating every day.

=== 5 December ===
On 5 December, protesters tried to break into the Government Palace. Christmas trees were burned at Sükhbaatar Square. Protesters briefly blocked the capital's main boulevard, Peace Avenue. The protesters also moved towards the residence of the Prime Minister, but the police blocked the road to it. After the failed storming of the Government Palace, and 13 police injuries by the stampede, the authorities announced a forceful dispersal of the demonstration if protesters did not disperse by 22:00 local time.

Mongolian authorities said they had created a working group to dialogue with the protesters. It was reported that the government of Mongolia discussed the situation three times and introduced a "special regime" about the state-owned coal company Erdenes Tavantolgoi. The Minister of Economic Development named five former directors of the company as suspects in the theft of coal.

=== 7–8 December ===
Prime Minister Luvsannamsrain Oyun-Erdene met with the protesters to try and calm public anger about the corruption. He admitted that stolen coal in Mongolia is "a public issue" and it would be resolved in "a more timely manner" "once and for all". He also called for national reconciliation underpinned by parliamentary democratic governance. Some protesters expressed their frustration by throwing rocks and small objects at the prime minister, shouting "Hold the coal thieves accountable".

Speaker of the State Great Khural Gombojavyn Zandanshatar announced the creation of a parliamentary working group to investigate coal corruption. Parliament's Standing Committee on Economy approved the working group's proposal to have a public hearing, which was decided to be held on 21 December, and within the 14-day preparation period, the working group was tasked to organise to collect opinions of citizens and involve witnesses and relevant officials. Relevant personnel were encouraged to testify and provide evidence to the legal authorities risking being criminally liable for concealing a crime.

On 8 December, Internal Affairs Minister Khishgeegiin Nyambaatar announced the arrest of several suspects in the coal theft affair, including Battulgyn Gankhuyag, former executive director of Erdenes Tavantolgoi, his wife, sister, and son-in-law.

=== 13 December ===
Several hundred protesters were reported to still gather at the city's central square to push for reforms and actions from the government.

Mongolia's Internal Affairs Minister announced the plan to make Erdenes Tavantolgoi (ETT) go public to help drive out graft, claiming that "It is expected that this will end the problems of transparency in the mining sector and public officials' corruption." He added that all contracts signed by ETT have now been made public, and details of the owners of 25,000 trucks involved in transporting ETT coal have also been disclosed. Mongolian authorities also planned to appoint a top international auditor to look into ETT's finances.

== International reactions ==
On 5 December, the United States Embassy in Mongolia responded to the protests by urging U.S. citizens to avoid demonstrations and crowded places.

On 6 December, Chinese Foreign Ministry's spokesperson Mao Ning responded with regard to this incident, "As a friendly neighbor, China believes the government of Mongolia will properly probe and handle the incident. If Mongolia makes such a request, the competent authorities in China will provide necessary assistance in accordance with relevant laws and regulations."

== Injuries ==
On the night of 5 December, 13 police officers and internal troops were injured during the protestors' attempted assault on the Government Palace, one of them was hospitalized. Furthermore, in the first week, around 30 protesters suffered soft tissue injuries, sprained ligaments, and increased blood pressure in the freezing cold temperatures.

== Aftermath ==
In the wake of the mass demonstrations, Mongolia proceeded with multifaceted reforms and legal actions:

- Parliament convened a working group that held a public hearing on 21 December 2022, marking a new era of official engagement.
- Several high-ranking individuals—including former ETT executives like Battulgyn Gankhuyag—and other business associates were arrested and prosecuted.
- From late 2023 to 2024, Mongolia’s Criminal Code was amended to impose stricter penalties on corruption, expand asset seizure capabilities, and shorten statutes of limitation for high-level officials.
- Erdenes Tavan Tolgoi was placed under special state management, began disclosing its contract data and truck fleet ownership, and moved toward public listing. Authorities also initiated a shift to auction-based coal sales.
- Despite these reforms, enforcement remains uneven. Civil society and international observers note that some prosecutions have yielded convictions, but many cases are prolonged or stalled in court.
- The 2022 protests reinvigorated civic activism—sparking a wave of public demand for transparency, accountable governance, and institutional change.

== See also ==
- 2008 riot in Mongolia
- 2018–2019 Mongolian protests
- 2021 Mongolian protests
- Mongolian Revolution of 1990
