= UHG =

UHG may refer to:

== Healthcare ==
- Unison Healthcare Group, a Taiwanese medical device company
- UnitedHealth Group, a United States healthcare company
- University Hospital Galway, Ireland

== Other ==
- Ukhaa Khudag Coal Mine, Mongolia
- Ukrainian Helsinki Group, a defunct human rights organization
