= Mongolian military ranks =

The Military ranks of Mongolia are the military insignia used by the Mongolian Armed Forces and other military organisations such as Border defense troops, Internal troops, National emergency management agency, General executive agency of Court decision, General intelligence agency, and the State special security department.

== Current ranks and insignia ==
Current rank system is established in 2003 by introducing Sergeant major and Master sergeant ranks. In 2006 Brigadier general, General ranks were introduced and Colonel general, General of the Army ranks were abolished. Current set of rank insignia introduced in 2017. Officers insignia ulzii replaced by five-pointed star and non-commissioned officers insignia pattern replaced by chevrons.

=== Shoulder board of government officials ===
Shoulder board of President as Commander-in-chief of armed forces.

Shoulder board of cabinet members and deputy minister of defence.

=== Commissioned officer ranks ===
The rank insignia of commissioned officers.

Rank group	General / flag officers				Senior officers			Junior officers
Parade uniform
Service uniform
Uniform shirt
Field uniform
Native name	Генерал; Gyenyeral	Дэслэгч генерал Deslegch gyenyeral	Хошууч генерал Khoshuuch gyenyeral	Бригадын генерал Brigadyn gyenyeral	Хурандаа; Khurandaa	Дэд хурандаа Ded khurandaa	Хошууч; Khoshuuch	Ахмад; Akhmad	Ахлах дэслэгч Akhlakh deslegch	Дэслэгч; Deslegch
Translation	General	Lieutenant general	Major general	Brigadier general	Colonel	Lieutenant colonel	Major	Captain	First lieutenant	Lieutenant

=== Other ranks ===
The rank insignia of non-commissioned officers and enlisted personnel.

Rank group	NCOs					Enlisted
Parade uniform
Service uniform
Uniform shirt
Field uniform
Native name	Тэргүүн ахлагч Tergüün akhlagch	Cургагч ахлагч Curgagch akhlagch	Aхлах ахлагч Akhlakh akhlagch	Aхлагч; Akhlagch	Дэд ахлагч Ded akhlagch	Ахлах түрүүч Akhlakh türüüch	Түрүүч; Türüüch	Дэд түрүүч Ded türüüch	Ахлах байлдагч Akhlakh baildagch	Байлдагч; Baildagch
Translation	Sergeant major	Master sergeant	Senior sergeant	Sergeant	Junior sergeant	Senior corporal	Corporal	Junior corporal	Senior private	Private

=== Enlisted personnel ===
Ranks	Armed forces		Border Protection Service troops		Internal troops	
Ranks	Compulsory service	Voluntary service	Compulsory service	Voluntary service	Compulsory service	Voluntary service
Private; Байлдагч	Mongolian Army-PVT-field	Mongolian Army-PVT(v)-field	Mongolian Border troops-PVT-field	Mongolian Border troops-PVT(v)-field	Mongolian Internal troops-PVT-field	Unknown
Senior private Ахлах байлдагч	Mongolian Army-PFC-field	Mongolian Army-PFC(v)-field	Mongolian Border troops-PFC-field	Mongolian Border troops-PFC(v)-field	Mongolian Internal troops-PFC-field	Unknown
Junior corporal Дэд түрүүч	Mongolian Army-JCP-field	Mongolian Army-JCP(v)-field	Mongolian Border troops-JCP-field	Mongolian Border troops-JCP(v)-field	Mongolian Internal troops-JCP-field	Unknown
Corporal; Түрүүч	Mongolian Army-CPL-field	Mongolian Army-CPL(v)-field	Mongolian Border troops-CPL-field	Mongolian Border troops-CPL(v)-field	Mongolian Internal troops-CPL-field	Unknown
Senior corporal Ахлах түрүүч	Mongolian Army-SCP-field	Mongolian Army-SCP(v)-field	Mongolian Border troops-SCP-field	Mongolian Border troops-SCP(v)-field	Mongolian Internal troops-SCP-field	Unknown

=== Branch and service color ===
Colors padding of shoulder boards and piping on uniforms are used in order to represent the type of branch or military organization.

Land force branch of the Armed forces:	Red
Air force branch of the Armed forces, General intelligence agency, State special security department:	Blue
Border Protection Force:	Green
Internal troops, General executive agency of Court decision:	Dark red
National emergency management agency (Civil defence):	Orange

Rank insignia of Air force branch of the Armed forces, General intelligence agency, and the State special security department

Parade uniform shoulder board
(Colonel)

Service uniform shoulder board
(Captain)

Uniform shirt shoulder board
(Senior sergeant)
Rank insignia of Border troops

Parade uniform shoulder board
(Lieutenant colonel)

Service uniform shoulder board
(Major)

Uniform shirt shoulder board
(Captain)

Field uniform shoulder board
(Sergeant)
Rank insignia of Internal troops and General executive agency of Court decision

Parade uniform shoulder board
(Major)

Service uniform shoulder board
(Senior lieutenant)

Uniform shirt shoulder board
(Lieutenant colonel)
Rank insignia of National emergency management agency (Civil defense)

Parade uniform shoulder board
(Colonel)

Service uniform shoulder board
(Lieutenant)

Uniform shirt shoulder board
(Junior sergeant)

== Historical ==
=== Ranks and insignia from 1990 to 1998 ===
In 1990, by the decree of Presidium of People's great khural, officers and non-commissioned officers insignia changed to 1936 design ulzii and "AA" letters of abbreviation People's army removed from enlisted personnel's shoulder board.

==== Officers ====
Rank group	General / flag officers			Senior officers			Junior officers
Parade uniform
Service uniform
Rank designation	Хурандаа генерал Khurandaa gyenyeral	Дэслэгч генерал Deslegch gyenyeral	Хошууч генерал Khoshuuch gyenyeral	Хурандаа; Khurandaa	Дэд хурандаа Ded khurandaa	Хошууч; Khoshuuch	Ахмад; Akhmad	Ахлах дэслэгч Akhlakh deslegch	Дэслэгч; Deslegch
Rank designation	Colonel general	Lieutenant general	Major general	Colonel	Lieutenant colonel	Major	Captain	Senior lieutenant	Lieutenant

==== Non-commissioned officers and Enlisted personnels ====
Rank group	Senior NCOs			Junior NCOs		Enlisted
Parade uniform
Service uniform
Rank designation	Aхлах ахлагч Akhlakh akhlagch	Aхлагч; Akhlagch	Дэд ахлагч Ded akhlagch	Ахлах түрүүч Akhlakh türüüch	Түрүүч; Türüüch	Дэд түрүүч Ded türüüch	Ахлах байлдагч Akhlakh baildagch	Байлдагч; Baildagch
Rank designation	Senior sergeant	Sergeant	Junior sergeant	Senior corporal	Corporal	Junior corporal	Senior soldier	Soldier

=== Ranks and insignia from 1998 to 2017 ===
In 1998, by the Presidential decree No.180, new uniform and rank insignia design approved. In 2011 generals shoulder board insignia ulzii changed to five pointed star and camouflage pattern of all field uniforms and shoulder boards changed to 4-tone digital pattern.

==== Officers ====
Rank group	General / flag officers				Senior officers			Junior officers
Parade uniform
Service uniform
Field uniform
Rank designation	Генерал; Gyenyeral	Дэслэгч генерал Deslegch gyenyeral	Хошууч генерал Khoshuuch gyenyeral	Бригадын генерал Brigadyn gyenyeral	Хурандаа; Khurandaa	Дэд хурандаа Ded khurandaa	Хошууч; Khoshuuch	Ахмад; Akhmad	Ахлах дэслэгч Akhlakh deslegch	Дэслэгч; Deslegch
Rank designation	General (Colonel general until 2006)	Lieutenant general	Major general	Brigadier general (from 2006)	Colonel	Lieutenant colonel	Major	Captain	Senior lieutenant	Lieutenant

==== Non-commissioned officers and Enlisted personnels ====
Rank group	Senior NCOs					Junior NCOs		Enlisted
Parade uniform
Service uniform
Field uniform
Rank designation	Тэргүүн ахлагч Tergüün akhlagch	Cургагч ахлагч Curgagch akhlagch	Aхлах ахлагч Akhlakh akhlagch	Aхлагч; Akhlagch	Дэд ахлагч Ded akhlagch	Ахлах түрүүч Akhlakh türüüch	Түрүүч; Türüüch	Дэд түрүүч Ded türüüch	Ахлах байлдагч Akhlakh baildagch	Байлдагч; Baildagch
Rank designation	Sergeant major (from 2003)	Master sergeant (from 2003)	Senior sergeant	Sergeant	Junior sergeant	Senior corporal	Corporal	Junior corporal	Senior soldier	Soldier

==== Black variant of shoulder board ====
Black embroidery variant of officers and NCO's shoulder board was used mainly in peacekeeping missions.

Lieutenant colonel shoulder board, 1998 style camouflage pattern.

Lieutenant shoulder board, 2011 style camouflage pattern.

Junior sergeant shoulder board, 2011 style camouflage pattern.

== See also ==
- Military ranks of the Mongolian People's Republic
