= Erdenes Tavantolgoi =

Mongolian state-owned mining company

Erdenes Tavantolgoi JSC
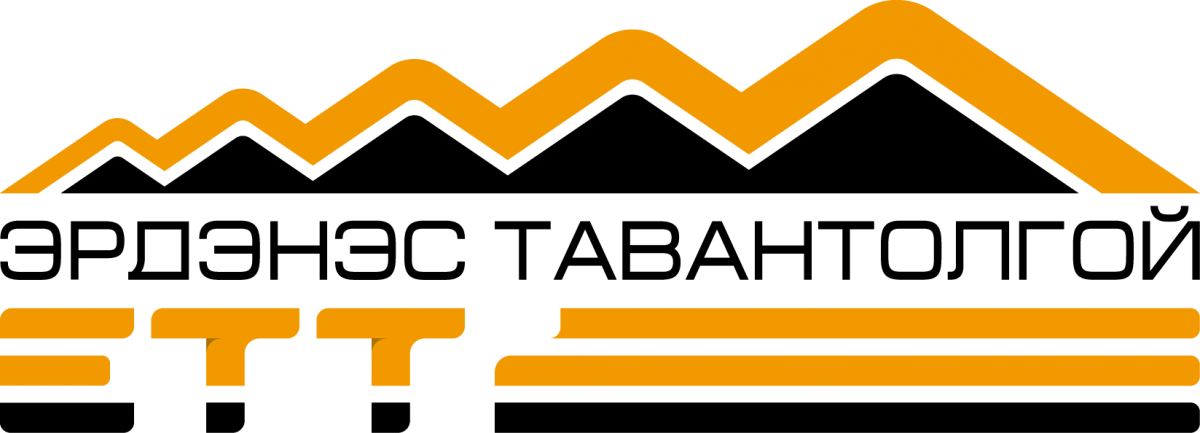
- Native name: Эрдэнэс Тавантолгой ХК (ЭТТ ХК)
- Type: State-owned JSC
- Industry: Mining
- Founded: 23 December 2010; 15 years ago
- Founder: Government of Mongolia
- Headquarters: Ulaanbaatar, Mongolia
- Products: Coal
- Website: ett.mn/mn

Erdenes Tavantolgoi JSC (Mongolian: Эрдэнэс Тавантолгой ХК; abbreviated ETT JSC or ETT) is a Mongolian state-owned joint-stock company that operates in the Tavan Tolgoi mine in Ömnögovi Province. It is the largest coal exporter and government enterprise in Mongolia.

== History ==
=== Founding ===
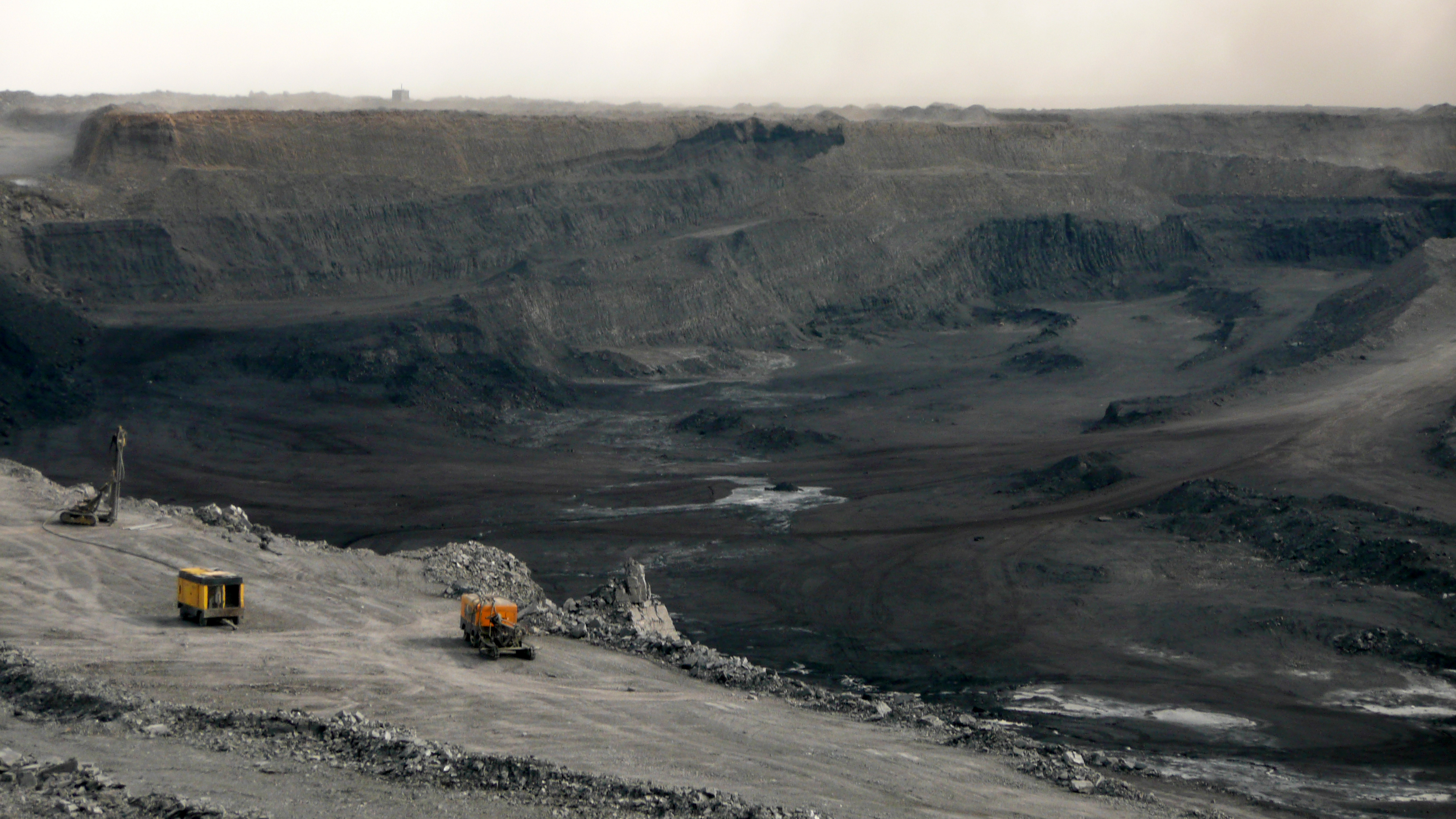
Tavan Tolgoi coal mine in March 2010

On 27 August 2010, the "Erdenes-Tavantolgoi" project was launched, with soil-cutting work officially beginning. Subsequently, the "Erdenes Tavantolgoi" Joint-Stock Company was established on 23 December 2010 by Resolution No. 39 of the State Great Khural and Resolution No. 272 of the Government of Mongolia. Under the respective decisions, ETT JSC was tasked with utilizing the coal-rich Tavan Tolgoi deposit and conducting mining operations in accordance with the Law on Minerals.

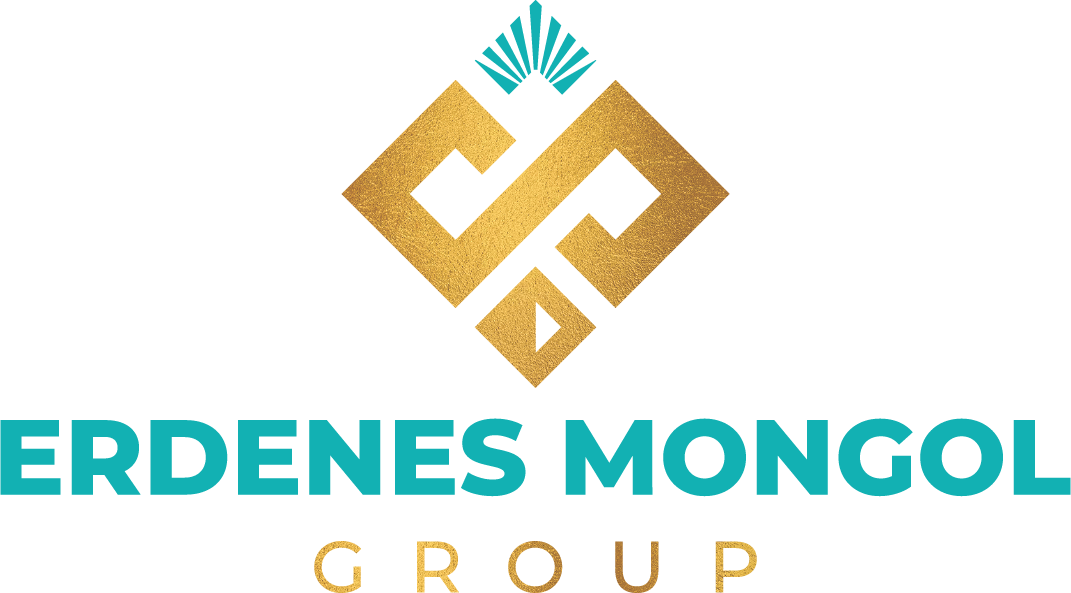
Erdenes Mongol Group, a state-owned enterprise representing government ownership in the mining sector, holds around 73% of ETT JSC shares

According to Resolution No. 39 of 2010, up to 20 percent of ETT JSC's shares may be publicly traded; this limit was raised to 30 percent for both domestic and international stock exchanges by Resolution No. 73 of 2018.

In 2019, ETT JSC had a total of 822 employees, all of whom were Mongolians. 62 percent of the employees had higher education, 27 percent were residents of Ömnögovi province, and 12 percent were residents of Tsogttsetsii sum.

In 2026, Erdenes Tavantolgoi launched a targeted development of the Borteeg coking coal block, a central section of the Tavan Tolgoi deposit, inviting international investors through a request for expressions of interest. This block-by-block approach reflects a strategic shift from earlier attempts to sell or partially privatize the entire Tavan Tolgoi complex, aiming to minimize political and operational risk while monetizing the 424 million ton coal reserve. The Borteeg initiative could generate over $1 billion in export revenue if successfully developed, setting a potential template for unlocking other parts of Tavan Tolgoi.

=== Coal Theft Scandal ===
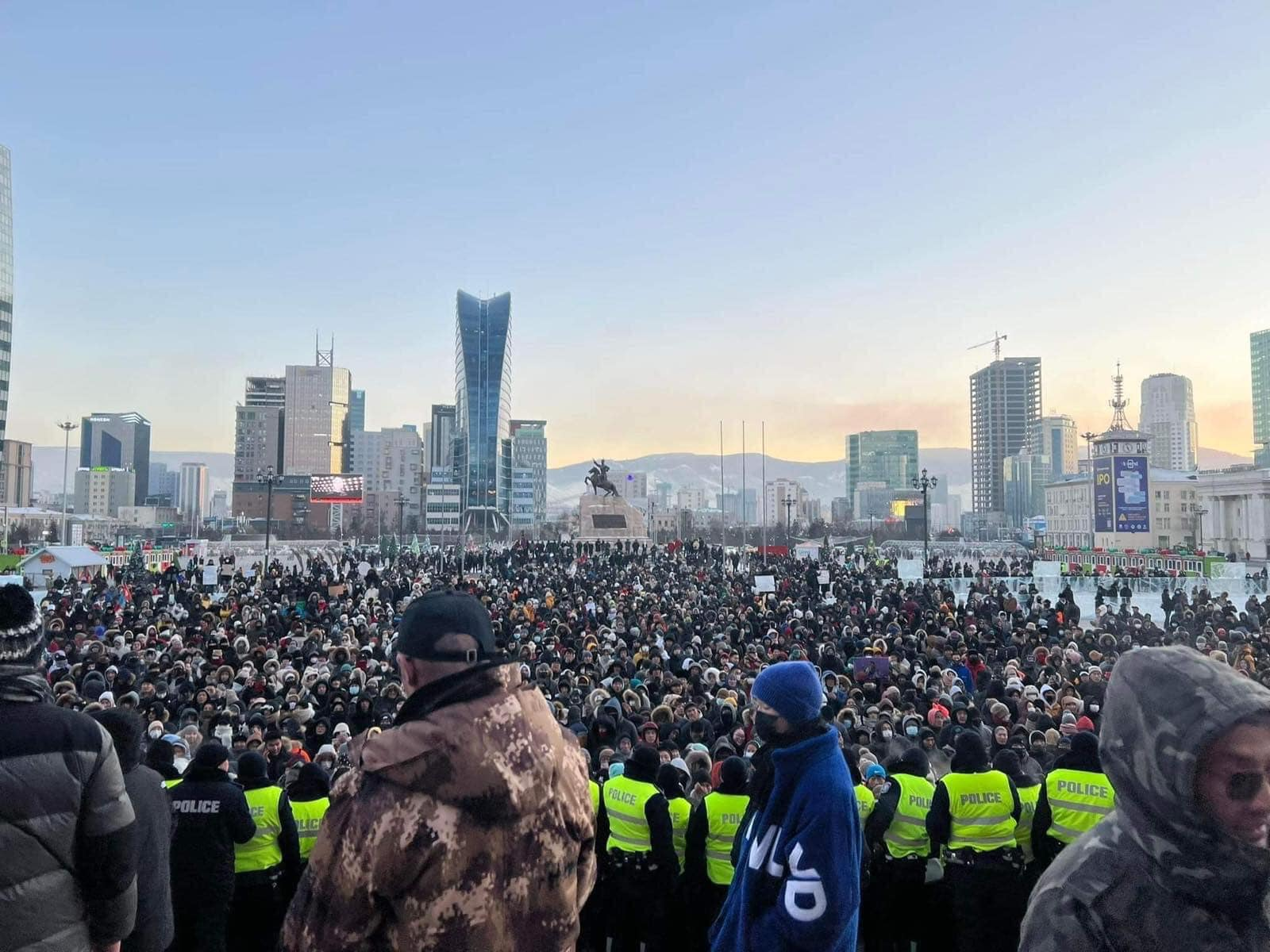
Protestors in Sükhbaatar Square during the Coal Theft Protests in December 2022

In December 2022, mass protests broke out in response to a corruption scandal involving a theft of $12.9 billion worth of coal by government officials to China. The protests led to the formation of a parliamentary working group, a public hearing on 21 December 2022, the arrest of multiple businessmen and politicians, including former ETT CEO Battulgyn Gankhuyag, and a special state regime over ETT JSC.

In 2024, a coal enrichment plant was put into operation. Its first product, 12.8 thousand tons of enriched coking coal, was sold and exported via electronic trading on the Mongolian Stock Exchange in October 2024.

The Government of Mongolia has on multiple occasions instructed relevant bodies to expedite the transformation of Erdenes Tavantolgoi into a public joint-stock company. In November 2025, an independent auditing firm conducted an audit of the company as part of the phased preparations for public listing on the stock exchange.

Company key figures since 2014
Year	Coal mined (tons)	Sales (tons)	Profit (USD)	Tax payment (MNT)
2014	4,500,000	5,700,000	202,000,000	63,000,000,000
2015	3,800,000	4,100,000	122,000,000	48,000,000,000
2016	7,700,000	7,500,000	211,000,000	72,000,000,000
2017	10,100,000	8,500,000	486,000,000	236,000,000,000
2018	11,100,000	13,100,000	802,000,000	479,000,000,000
2019	16,200,000	15,500,000	1,000,000,000	736,000,000,000
2020	13,100,000	11,900,000	592,000,000	490,000,000,000
2021	8,600,000	6,300,000	396,000,000	421,000,000,000
2022	11,300,000	11,500,000	1,110,000,000	1,017,000,000,000
2023	19,400,000	29,500,000	2,437,000,000	2,800,000,000,000
2024	30,400,000	29,600,000	3,000,000,000	3,500,000,000,000
Source: Ikon.mn, ETT 2024

== See also ==
- History of modern Mongolia
- Economy of Mongolia
- Mining in Mongolia
- Tavan Tolgoi
- 2022 Mongolian protests
