= Galdangiin Orgilbold =

Mongolian powerlifter (born 1986)

Personal information
- Nationality: Mongolia
- Born: 21 November 1986 (age 39)
- Weight: 89 kg (196 lb)

Sport
- Sport: Powerlifting
Medal record
Men's Powerlifting
Representing Mongolia
IPF World Classic Bench Press Championships
Gold medal – first place	2025 Drammen	93 kg
Gold medal – first place	2024 Austin	93 kg
Gold medal – first place	2023 Sun City	93 kg
Gold medal – first place	2022 Almaty	93 kg

Galdangiin Orgilbold (born 1986) is a Mongolian powerlifter. He is a four-time gold medalist at the IPF World Classic Bench Press Championships.

Galdangiin Orgilbold is amateur athlete, who has been competing in powerlifting since 2016. As a child, he practiced Mongolian wrestling, known as Bökh. Orgilbold trains under the guidance of Enkhbayaryn Sodnompiljee and Dashiin Battulga. In 2018 and 2019, he finished fifth at the World Championships. In 2022, he went to Almaty, Kazakhstan, where sang the national anthem for the first time. He became a two-time World Champion in 2023.

Orgilbold works as a mining foreman at the Energy Resources company in Tsogttsetsii sum of Ömnögovi Province and is the four sons′ father.

== Highlight achievements ==
Career accomplishments include:

- 2025 World Men's Open Classic Bench Press Championships Winner.
- 2024 World Men's Open Classic Bench Press Championships Winner.
- 2024 Asian Men's Classic Bench Press Championships Winner.
- 2023 World Men's Classic Bench Press Championships Winner.
- 2022 World Men's Classic Bench Press Championships Winner.
