= Ukhaa Khudag Power Plant =

Coal-fired power plant in Ömnögovi, Mongolia

- Official name: Ухаа Худаг Цахилгаан Станц
- Country: Mongolia
- Location: Ömnögovi
- Coordinates: 43°40′20.2″N 105°32′22.7″E
- Status: Operational
- Commission date: September 2011

Thermal power station
- Primary fuel: Coal
- Turbine technology: Steam turbine

Power generation
- Nameplate capacity: 18 MW

The Ukhaa Khudag Power Plant (Mongolian: Ухаа Худаг Цахилгаан Станц) is a coal-fired power station in Ömnögovi Province, Mongolia.

== History ==
The power plant was commissioned in September 2011.

== Technical specifications ==
The power plant has a total installed capacity of 18 MW. It supplies electricity for the mining operation of Ukhaa Khudag Coal Mine and Tsogttsetsii sum.

== See also ==
- List of power stations in Mongolia
