= Law enforcement in Mongolia =

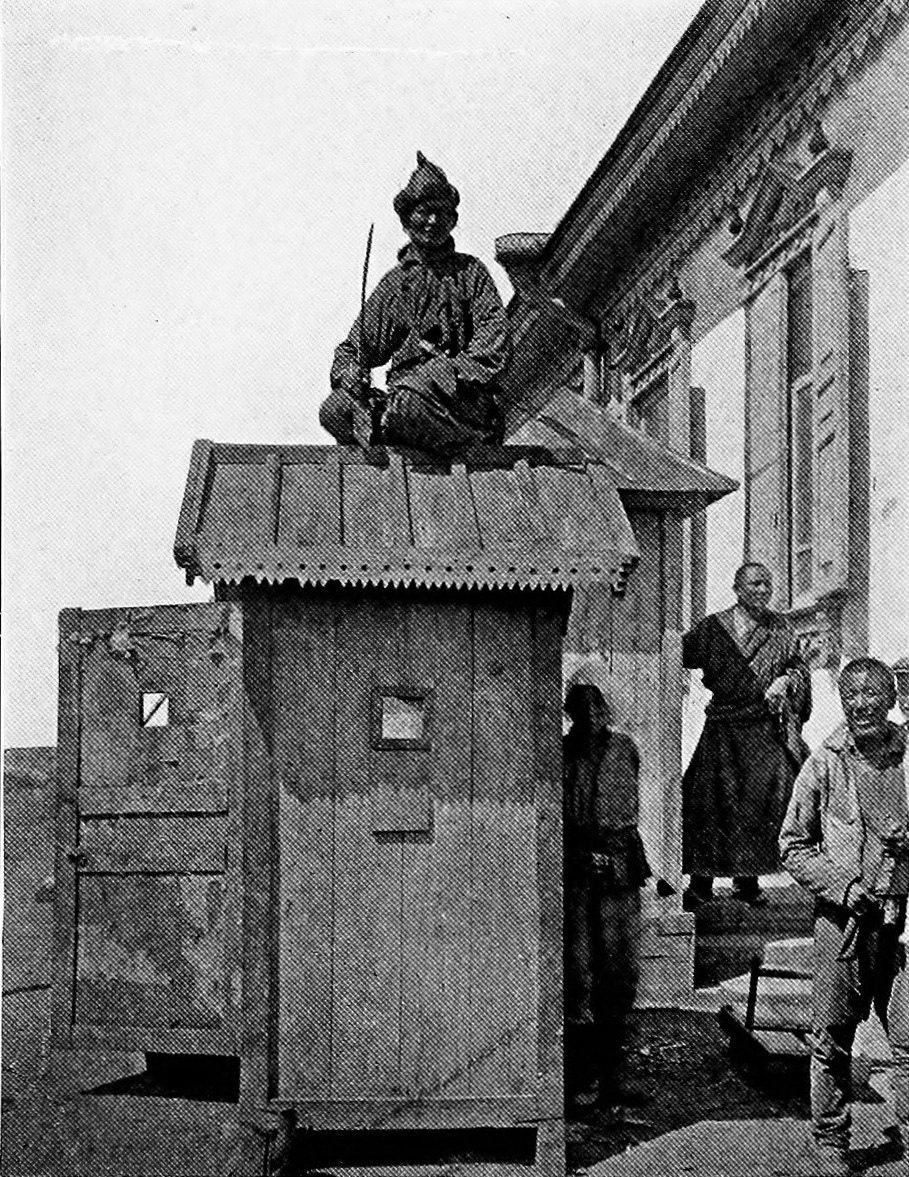
The traffic policeman on Urga's broadway in 1913.

The Ministry of Justice and Home Affairs is the sole organ of national security in Mongolia. The primary force responsible for maintaining law and order and preventing crime throughout the country is the National Police Agency, created in 1965 and headquartered in the capital Ulaanbaatar. Interpol has an office within the Mongolian Police.

== Police agency ==
Law enforcement forces in the socialist Mongolian People's Republic, along with the military (Mongolian People's Army), was respected institution and profession in the country. In August 1991, the government prohibited police and security officials from membership in political parties, specifically in light of previous corruption by police officials who were part of the Mongolian People's Party. The 2013 "Law on Police" governs police activity in Mongolia, stipulating that it is prohibited for any law enforcement body to treat an arrested person in an "inhuman and degrading manner". Despite this, according to some scholars, the Mongolian police does practice torture and degrading treatments. In October 2017, officials from the OSCE organized a training course on the handling of organized crime and the trafficking of human beings. In April 2019, the Independent Authority Against Corruption (IAAC) called on Mongolia to strengthen its law enforcement institutions, praising the work of the police in enforcing new criminal laws.

== Internal troops ==
The Internal Troops are the paramilitary gendarmerie law enforcement agency and the reserve forces of the Mongolian Armed Forces. It serves as a riot police and a special purpose unit that guards important government buildings such as the Mongolian National Broadcaster and Altan-Ölgii National Cemetery. The Internal Troops in its current form was established in February 2014.

== Border police ==
The General Authority for Border Protection, commonly known as the Border Police or the Border Guard performs policing duties at Mongolian border checkpoints and conducts vehicle inspections crossing the border. It also does bag checks at Buyant-Ukhaa International Airport and New Ulaanbaatar International Airport like the American Transportation Security Administration (TSA). Other militarized border guard forces are subordinated to the Main Directorate of Border Defense of the Ministry of Defense.

== Duties ==
The mandate of police is to implement state policy on crime fighting and maintaining public order, to carry out police duties throughout Mongolia and manage services provided at local level, to develop policy on firearms (shooting techniques, special equipment, and associated needs) and on human resources, training and methods for improving knowledge and skills, protecting the rights and legal interests of police officers, organizing police work in keeping with Mongolia’s Constitution, to inform the President of Mongolia, the Head of the Parliament, the Prime Minister and government members about emerging crime trends, methods for fighting crime and public order issues and to make suggestions as to how to most effectively address them and to develop relations with national and international organizations.
