= Mongolian Mining Corporation =

Company of Mongolia

- Company type: Public company
- Traded as: SEHK: 975
- Industry: Coal mining
- Founded: May 18, 2010
- Headquarters: Ulaanbaatar, Mongolia
- Area served: Mongolia
- Key people: Odjargal Jambaljamts (Chairman)
- Products: Coking Coal
- Services: Coal mining
- Revenue: USD 1,034.8 million
- Net income: USD 240.1 million
- Number of employees: 2,372 (31 December 2023)
- Subsidiaries: Energy Resources Mining LLC, Khangad Exploration LLC, Baruun Naran S.a.r.l
- Website: Official Website

Mongolian Mining Corporation (MMC) is a Mongolian coking coal producer listed in the Hong Kong Stock Exchange. It is the largest coal mining company in Mongolia, owning two coal mines located in the Gobi Desert, namely the Ukhaa Khudag mine and the Baruu Naran mine.

== History ==
MMC was incorporated in the Cayman Islands as an exempted company with limited liability on May 18, 2010 in anticipation of the Global Offering in Hong Kong. Prior to the incorporation, the business was operated by Energy Resources LLC, a limited liability corporation organized under Mongolian law on April 22, 2005, currently an indirect wholly owned subsidiary of MMC.

MMC was listed in the Hong Kong Stock Exchange on October 13, 2010.

== Operations ==
MMC is engaged in open-pit mining at the Ukhaa Khudag (UHG) deposit located within the Tavan Tolgoi coal formation in Southern Gobi via Energy Resources LLC, and operates the Baruun Naran mine via its wholly owned subsidiary, Khangad Exploration LLC.

== Shareholders ==
According to the 2023 Annual Report of MMC, Odjargal Jambaljamts, the Chairman of the company, is the largest shareholder of the company. Kerry Group Limited, a conglomerate in Hong Kong, also owns a substantial interest in MMC.
