= University of Internal Affairs of Mongolia =

University in Bayanzürkh, Ulaanbaatar, Mongolia

Coordinates: 47°54′53″N 106°59′44″E

- Дотоод Хэргийн Их Сургууль
- Type: university
- Established: 1934
- Location: Ulaanbaatar, Mongolia
- Website: Official website (in Mongolian)

The University of Internal Affairs (Mongolian: Дотоод Хэргийн Их Сургууль) is an institution of the Mongolian Ministry of Justice and Home Affairs that serves as a public higher education institution in Mongolia dedicated to training of law enforcement personnel such as police officers. The main campus of the university is located in Bayanzürkh, Ulaanbaatar.

== History ==
The Law Enforcement University was first established in 1934 (92 years ago) as the Central School of the Ministry of Internal Affairs by the Decree No. 8 of the Council of Ministers of the Mongolian People’s Republic (passed on the 6 July 1933). Immediately following the passing of this order, the interior minister appointed a career officer to the post of headmaster of the school. In 1944, the State Security and Guard School was dissolved and unified with the central school to establish the State Border and Internal Military School, having the aim of jointly of preparing law and intelligence specialists within a 3-year period. In 1974, the State Border and Internal Military School was re-established as the Specialized Military School under the Ministry of Public Security and was later expanded into a college while simultaneously beginning to prepare Border Protection Command officers, political commissars and correctional service personnel.

At the end of the socialist era in 1990, the military college was reorganized under the General State Police and became the police college in 1992, offering courses in two fields: law and border protection. In 1994 the border Guard element of the college was transferred to the National Defense University (MNDU), becoming the Border Protection Faculty. Moreover, in 1996, the MNDU expanded the faculty to be established as the Border Troops Institute in the form of an affiliate school. 4 years later, the police college was renamed and became the police academy. A year later in 2001, the Border Troop School of the MNDU was reorganized to become the Border Troop College, as a separate organization controlled by the General Authority for Border Protection. In 2011, by order of the State Great Khural and the government of Prime Minister Sükhbaataryn Batbold, the Police Academy and Border Troop College were unified under the Ministry of Justice and Internal Affairs as the University of Internal Affairs, before finally being renamed a year later to the Law Enforcement University of Mongolia. In August 2018, a military high school (lyceum) was established as part of the university.
