= National Police Agency (Mongolia) =

Law enforcement agency of Mongolia

National Police Agency Цагдаагийн Ерөнхий Газар Tsagdaagiin Erönkhii Gazar
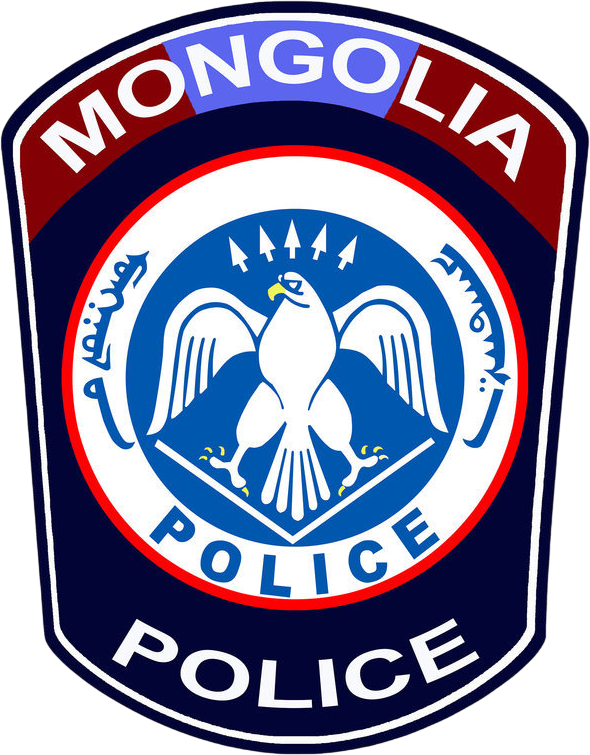
- Patch of the National Police Agency

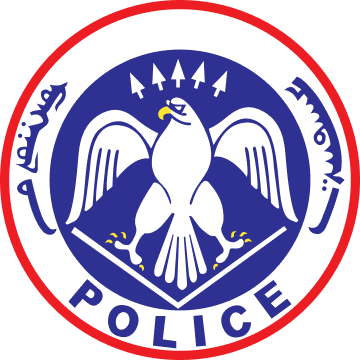
- Seal of the National Police Agency

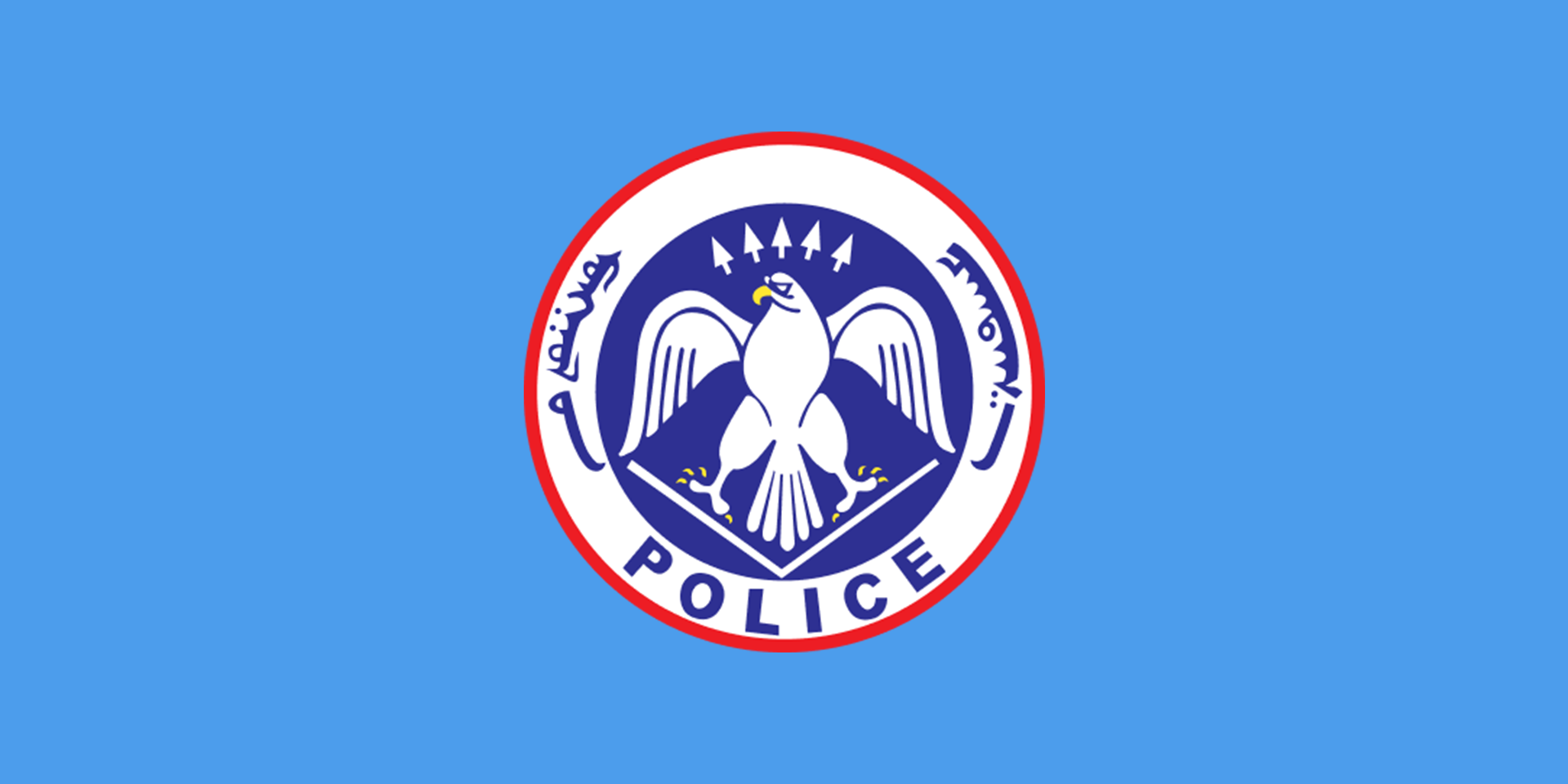
- Flag of the National Police Agency
- Abbreviation: NPA ("National Police Agency"); ЦЕГ ("Цагдаагийн Ерөнхий Газар")

Agency overview
- Formed: 19 July 1921

Jurisdictional structure
- National agency: Mongolia
- Operations jurisdiction: Mongolia
- Constituting instrument: Law on Police Service
- General nature: Civilian police

Operational structure
- Headquarters: Ulaanbaatar, Mongolia
- Parent agency: Ministry of Justice and Internal Affairs

Website
- Official website

The National Police Agency (Mongolian: Цагдаагийн Ерөнхий Газар, romanized: Tsagdaagiin Erönkhii Gazar) is an agency that is part of the Government of Mongolia and acts as a reserve force for the Armed Forces of Mongolia. It is currently an agency of the Mongolian Ministry of Justice and Internal Affairs and is the primary law enforcement organization in Mongolia. The Police is assisted by the Directorate of the Internal Troops of Mongolia.

== History ==
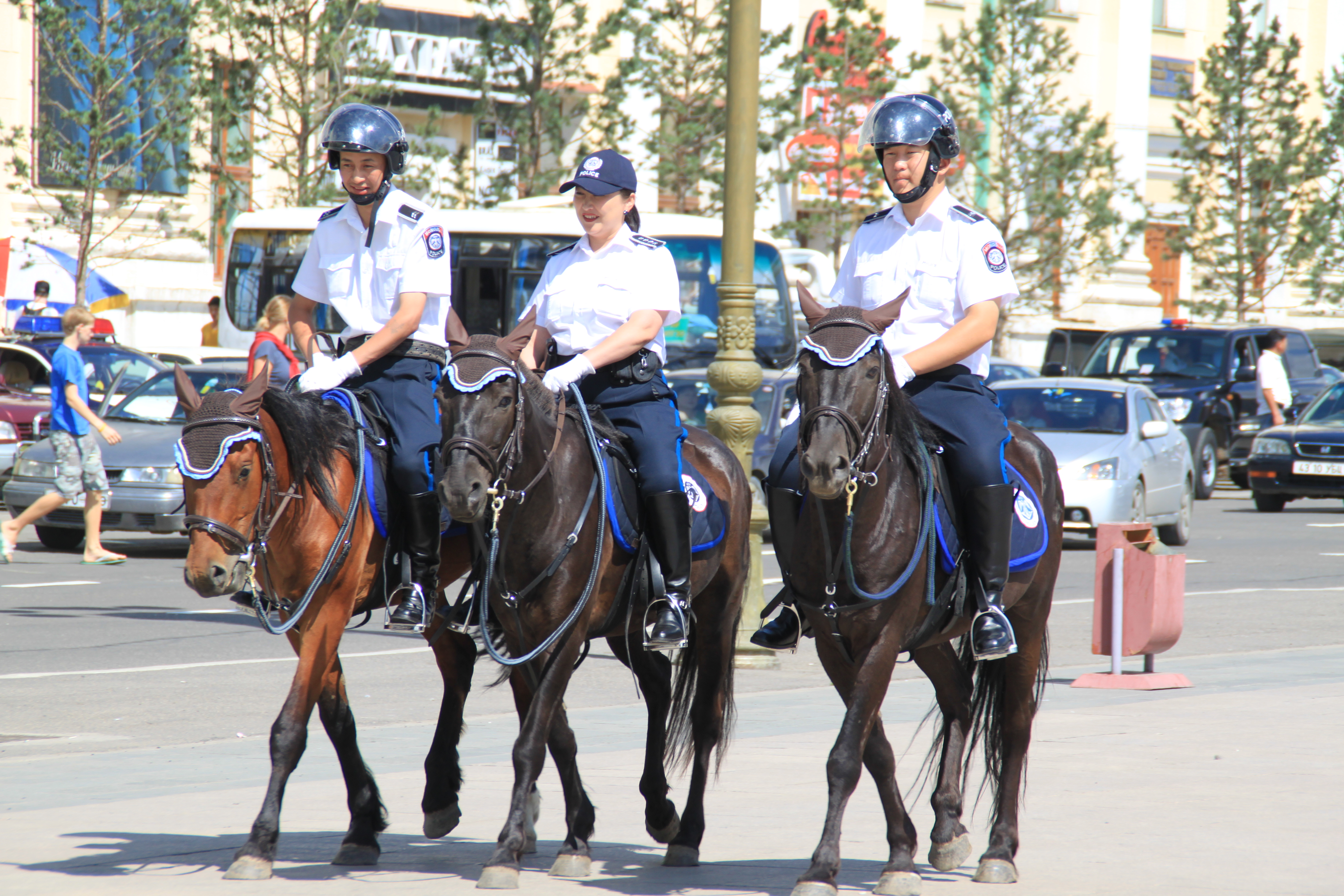
Mounted police officers in Ulanbaatar.

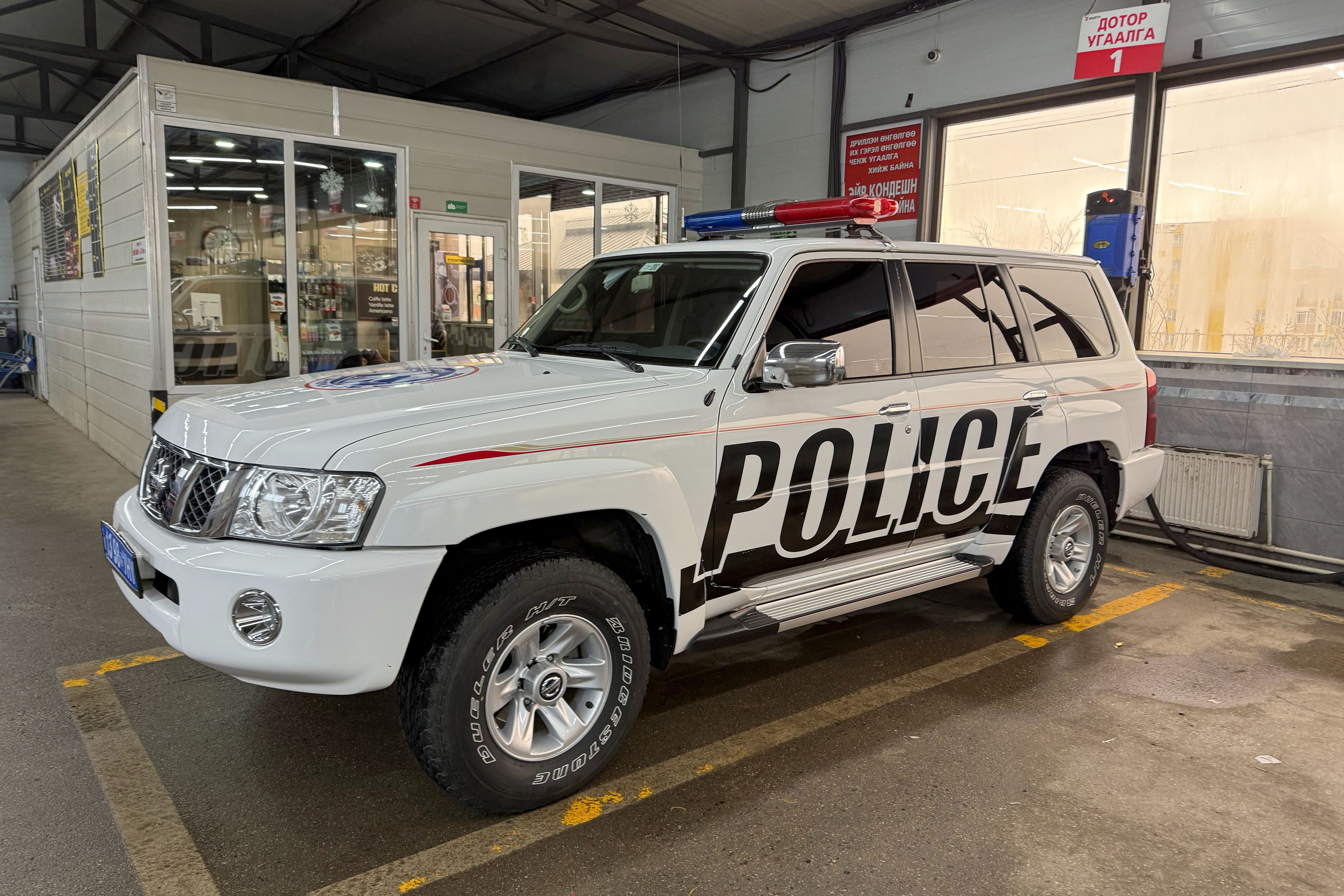
Nissan Patrol Y61 patrol vehicle

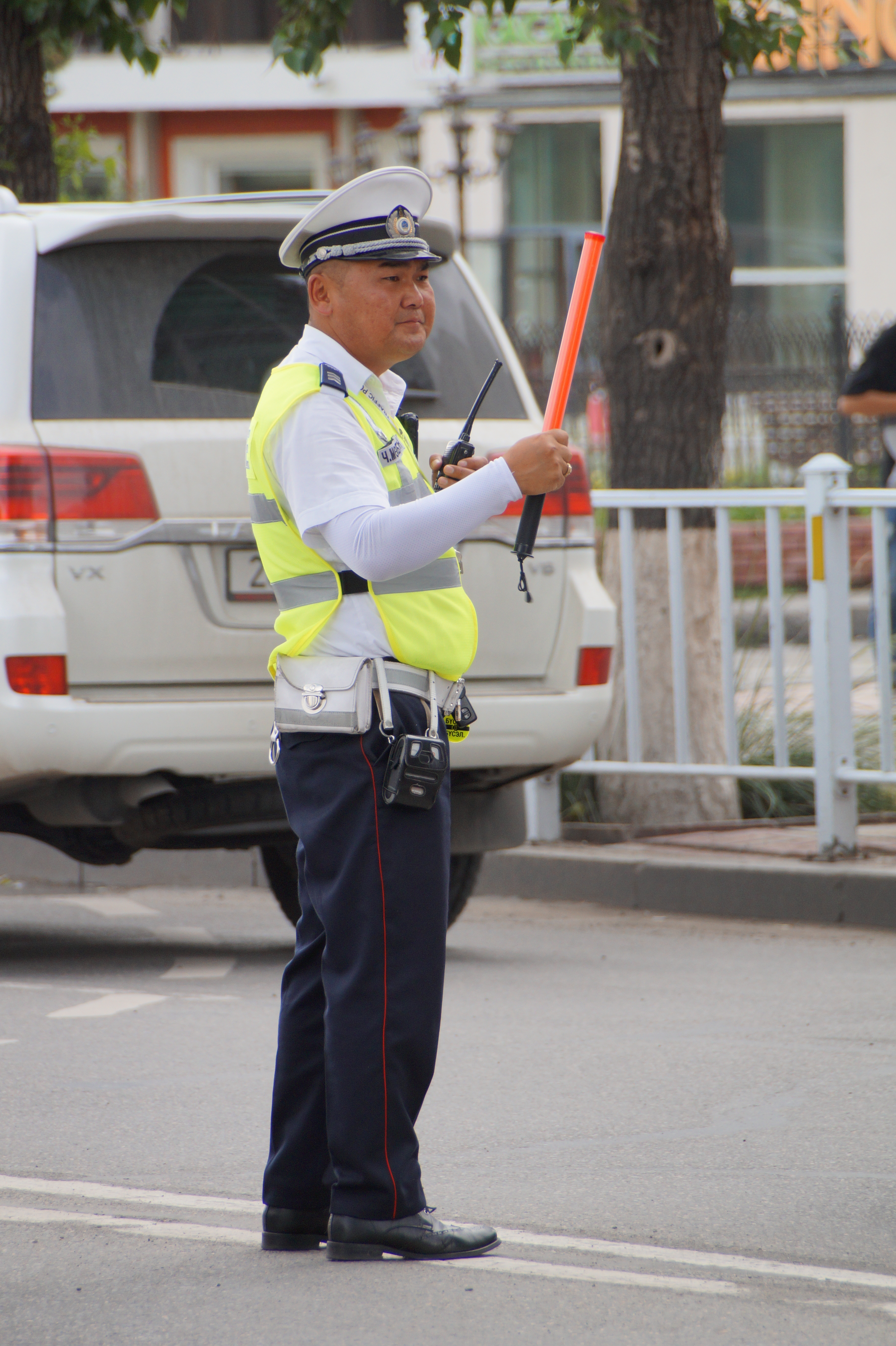
A traffic enforcement officer

In 1866 the Qing rulers established a police force for the 15 districts of the Khüree (Ulaanbaatar) area colloquially named "fifteener police" (арван тавны цагдаа arvan tavny tsagdaa). After the Mongolian Revolution of 1911 and the independence of Outer Mongolia it became a national police force. The founding day of the Militsiya style police force was 19 July 1921, when the 6th Session of the Ulsyn Baga Khural (Little Khural) decreed to establish the "Preventive Militia" (цагдан сэргийлэх tsagdan sergiilekh) with the same mandat as a modern police force. This order came days after the Mongolian Revolution of 1921 which led to the declaration of the Mongolian People's Republic in 1924.

From 1934 to 1940, specialized departments were established throughout the various Aimags. From 1940 to 1960, the Prosecutor's Office instituted a law enforcement body to enforce the new Constitution of Mongolia, the Criminal Law and the Criminal Procedure Code. In the 1960s, the structure and organization of the police were expanded and in 1965, made a separate institution from the Prosecutor's Office. In celebration of the 50th anniversary of the establishment of the police, the Military Institute was established by the decree of the Presidium of the People's Great Khural on 14 July 1984. The institute now takes the form of the Law Enforcement University of Mongolia.

From its establishment until 1990s, the agency was under the command of the Ministry of Public Security. As a result of the political and revolutionary transitions and market economy in 1990s, the police underwent a drastic transformation and was reestablished as the National Police Agency of the Government of Mongolia subordinated to the Ministry of Justice and Internal Affairs and mandated to combat crime and maintain safety on a national basis with an International Police Department being established a year later. In 1993, the State Great Khural approved the "Law on Police Organization" in order to establish legal basis for law enforcement.

The NPA's Special Operations Unit, along with the Mongolian Internal Troops, took part in the international "SWAT Challenge" competition for the first time in 2026.

== Organization ==
The Mongolian National Police Agency is divided into various departments and units including:

- Commissioner General of the NPA
  - Administrative Department
    - Planning and Coordination Division
    - Human Resources Division
    - Enlightment and Capacity Building Division
    - Foreign Affairs and Peacekeeping Operations Division
    - Legal Affairs Division
    - Joint Training Center for Police and Internal Troops
      - Odor Laboratory
    - Suld Ensemble
    - Huch Sports Committee
    - Central Archives of the NPA
  - Staff of the Internal Troops
  - Interpol National Central Bureau
  - Special Operations Department
    - Special Operations Unit
  - Technical Department
  - Press & Media Center
  - Finance and Logistics Department
  - First Deputy Commissioner of the NPA
    - Witness and Victim Protection Division
    - Prevention Division
    - Criminal Police Directorate
    - Criminal Investigation Directorate
    - Data, Analysis, and Coordination Directorate
      - Information and Rapid Coordination Center
    - Counter Narcotics Department
    - Ecological Police Directorate
  - Deputy Commissioner of the NPA
    - Internal Affairs and Security Department
  - Deputy Commissioner of the NPA and Head of the Metropolitan Police Department
    - Public Order and Security Directorate
    - Transportation Police Directorate
    - Administrative Violation Investigation Directorate
    - Rapid Response and Coordination Division
    - Police Licensing and Monitoring Center

Below the central level, there are Police Departments and Divisions in the 21 provinces and in Ulaanbaatar, further subdivided into Divisions, Units and Sections. The largest police training institution is the Mongolian Police Academy. As in many such institutions, the police academy operates within a hierarchical structure.

== Ranks ==
The NPA utilizes the following ranks:

- Top ranks (дээд цол):
  - Director (дарга; 1)
  - First Deputy Director (тэргүүн дэд дарга; 1)
  - Deputy Director (дэд дарга; 2)
- Senior ranks (ахлах цол):
  - Police Colonel (цагдаагийн хурандаа)
  - Police Lieutenant Colonel (цагдаагийн дэд хурандаа)
  - Police Major (цагдаагийн хошууч)
- Middle ranks (дунд цол):
  - Police Captain (цагдаагийн ахмад)
  - Police Senior Lieutenant (цагдаагийн ахлах дэслэгч)
  - Police Lieutenant (цагдаагийн дэслэгч)
- Junior ranks (бага цол):
  - Police First Sergeant (цагдаагийн тэргүүн ахлагч)
  - Police Trainer Sergeant (цагдаагийн сургагч ахлагч)
  - Police Senior Sergeant (цагдаагийн ахлах ахлагч)
  - Police Sergeant (цагдаагийн ахлагч)
  - Police Junior Sergeant (цагдаагийн дэд ахлагч)

== Symbols ==
=== Logo ===
The logo of the NPA is a white falcon, a Mongolian symbol of sharp eyes, bravery, and justice.

=== Slogan ===
The official slogan of the NPA is: "Striving together for peaceful and secure life".

=== Ensemble ===
The Suld Ensemble of the Mongolian Police (Mongolian: Цагдаагийн Сулд чуулга) was founded in 1991 as the official musical unit of the National Police Agency. Its founder, Colonel Pürevjavyn Khayankhyarvaa, was the former Head of the Military Music Service of the General Staff of the Mongolian People's Army. It consists of a group of professional artists, all of whom are part of the Mongolian Police Academy. In November 2018, a singer of the ensemble won the award at a competition for best performer of a Chinese classical song.

== See also ==
- Law enforcement in Mongolia
- Internal Troops of Mongolia
- General Authority for Border Protection
- Ministry of Justice and Home Affairs
- Police Academy
