= Ministry of Justice and Internal Affairs (Mongolia) =

Government ministry of Mongolia

Ministry of Justice and Home Affairs of Mongolia
- Монгол Улсын Хууль зүй, дотоод хэргийн яам

Agency overview
- Formed: 29 December 1911
- Jurisdiction: Government of Mongolia
- Headquarters: Khudaldaany St 6/1, Government Building V, Ulaanbaatar, Mongolia
- Employees: 108
- Annual budget: MNT 11.8 billion (about US$4.1 million) (2020)
- Minister responsible: Altangerel Oyunsaikhan
- Child agencies: National Police Agency; General Authority for Border Protection; General Authority for State Registration; General Archival Authority; General Executive Agency of Court Decision; Mongolian Immigration Agency; Intellectual Property Office
- Website: mojha.gov.mn

The Ministry of Justice and Internal Affairs of Mongolia (MOJHA; Mongolian: Монгол Улсын Хууль зүй дотоод хэргийн яам; Mongol Ulsyn Khuul züin dotood khergiin yaam), also referred to as the Ministry of Justice or the Ministry of Home Affairs, is a Mongolian government agency that upholds the principles of fairness and rule of law in Mongolia, and aims to create legal guarantees so that the government may ensure human rights and freedoms. The ministry carries out activities such as developing legal policy (including its implementation and coordination), public administration, financing and investment, treaties and cooperation, and internal auditing (which includes monitoring and evaluating). It divides its security duties with the Ministry of Defense and the General Intelligence Agency.

The ministry is governed by the following relevant documents:

- Constitution of Mongolia
- The Law on Government
- Law on the legal status of the law
- Law on Administrative and Territorial Units and their Management
- Law on Budget
- Law on Fiscal Stability

== History ==
At the founding of the Bogd Khanate of Mongolia in 1911, a new Mongolian government was formed with five ministries, including internal affairs. It was first headed by Da Lam Tserenchimed, who later on became the first Prime Minister of Mongolia. In 1934, by resolution of the Council of People's Ministers, the rules of procedure of the State Internal Security Protection stipulated that all security threat protection activities on the territory of the state shall be conducted by aforementioned laws. In the mid-1930s, Prime Minister Peljidiin Genden balked at recommendations by Soviet leader Joseph Stalin to elevate the Committee of Internal Affairs of the Mongolian People's Republic, at least 26 percent of whose staff were agents of the Soviet NKVD at the time, to an independent cabinet-level ministry. Frustrated by Genden's disobedience, Stalin promoted Marshal Khorloogiin Choibalsan as the new Minister of Internal Affairs. In March 1936, Choibalsan's Interior Ministry orchestrated the firing of his government and the removal Genden from the post of First Secretary of the Central Committee of the People's Revolutionary Party, due to his role in the deterioration of Mongol–Soviet relations. Due to his status and the power of his opponents, namely the new head of government Anandyn Amar, Choibalsan and likewise the Ministry of Internal Affairs became the de facto most powerful body the country.

Just two months later the ministry amended its rules to include the detention high ranking politicians and public figures without first consulting any of its party or political superiors, effectively increasing its influence over the country. Under the direction and guidance Choibalsan's Soviet handler Chopyak and other mentors from the NKVD, the ministry planned over the next three years to carry out the repressive purges on opponents of Stalin/Choibalsan, religious figures (mostly Buddhist Lamas) and enemies of the state. Notable Russian aides to the ministry included Deputy NKVD Commissar Mikhail Frinovsky and NKVD Chief Nikolai Yezhov. When the purges ended, official blame was laid on the deputy minister of internal affairs Nasantogtoh, and his Soviet handler Kichikov.

The Interior Ministry was later replaced by the Ministry of Public Security. The Ministry of Public Security of the MPR served as a catalyst for the republic's paramilitary forces, which totaled around 30,000 men by 1955. It was founded in its current form after the abolition of the socialist state and its split from the General Intelligence Agency in 1990.

== Subordinate agencies ==
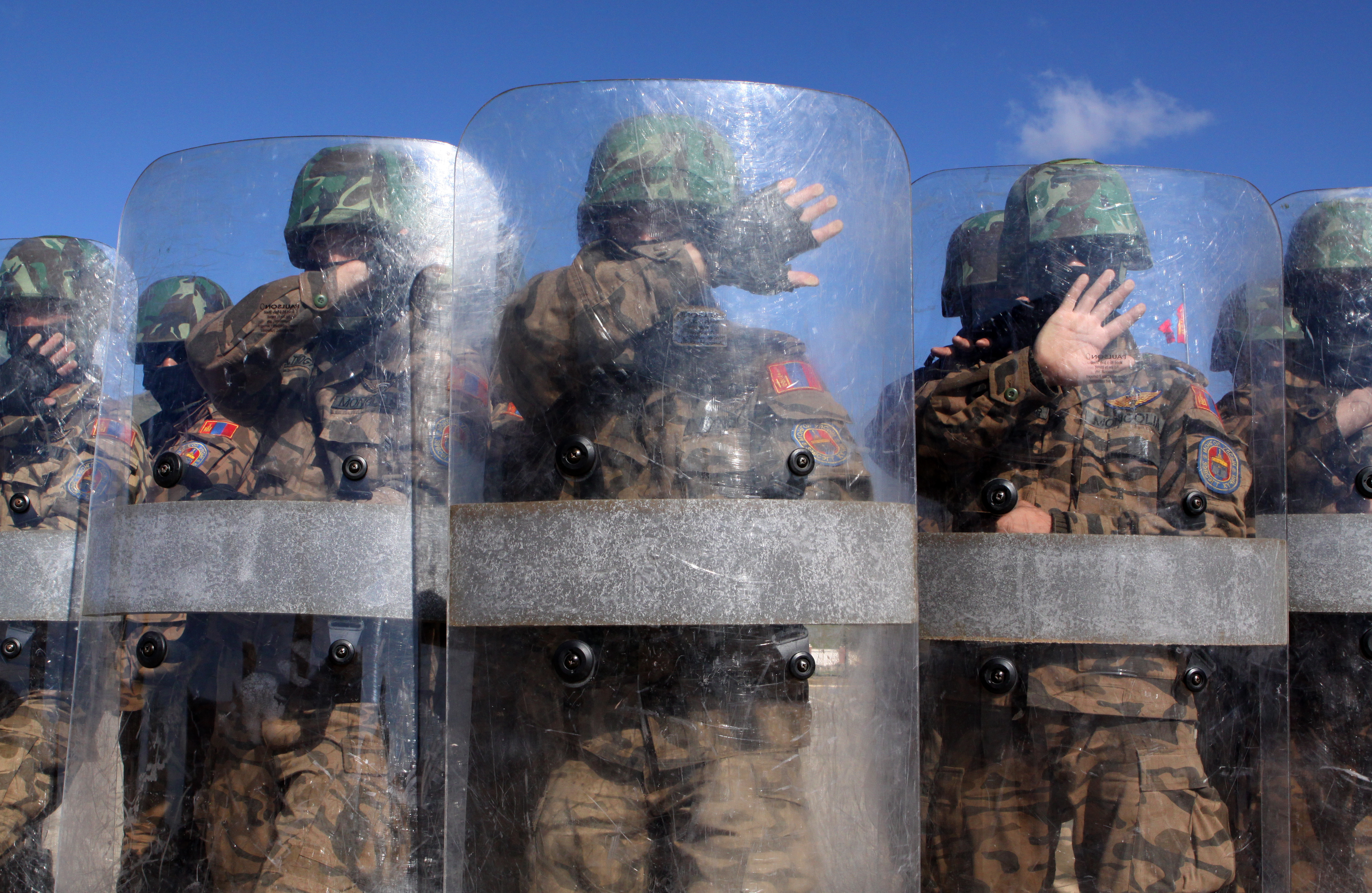
Members of the Mongolian Internal Troops.

- National Police Agency (Aрван тавны цагдаа)
- General Authority for Border Protection (Хилийн хамгаалалт)
- Internal Troops of Mongolia (Дотоод цэргүүд)
- General Authority for State Registration
- General Archival Authority
- General Executive Agency of Court Decision
- Mongolian Immigration Agency
- Intellectual Property Office

=== National Police Agency ===
Established in 1965, the National Police Agency is responsible for maintaining law and order and preventing crime throughout Mongolia. Its motto is "Striving together for peaceful and secure life".

=== Border Police ===
The Border Police, or Border Guard performs national security duties at the border checkpoints of Mongolia and Russia and China. Officially known as the General Authority for Border Protection, it conducts inspections of vehicles crossing the border and does bag checks at Chinggis Khaan and New Ulaanbaatar International Airport similarly to the American Transportation Security Administration (TSA). A force of border guards are subordinated to the Main Directorate of Border Defense of the Ministry of Defense and utilize motorized and mounted units as well as acquired helicopters for aerial reconnaissance.

=== Internal Troops ===
The Internal Troops is the National paramilitary force and reserve duties in the military. Under the command of a The Internal Troops are led by a chief of staff who reports directly to the Minister of Justice and Internal Affairs, It protects buildings for institutions and areas such as the Government Palace. As the successor to the Internal Troops of the Mongolian People's Army (then known as the Border and Internal Troops Administration), the Internal Troops in their current form were adopted in 1995, until it was dissolved in March 2013 by the State Great Khural before the recreation of the Internal Troops was reconsidered following the 2016 Mongolian legislative election. At the time of its original establishment, the Directorate of the Internal Troops was placed under the command of the Commissioner General, however, it was not fully clear what ministry has the ultimate control of it.

== List of ministers ==
=== Bogd Khanate of Mongolia ===
- Da Lam Tserenchimed (1911–1915)
- Dalai Setsen Khan (1915–1919)
- Chimeddorj (1920–1921)
- N. Magsarjav (1921–1922)
- D. Sodnomdorj (1922–1924)

=== Mongolian People's Republic ===
- D. Naidansuren (1924–1925)
- L. Dendev (1925–1930)
- Lamjav (1930–1932)
- J. Dendev (1932–1936)
- G. Tserendorj (1936–1938)
- Gompilyn Danshiytsoodol (May–July 1939)
- O. Ulziihutag (1939–1940)
- D. Dorjpurev (1940–1941)
- B. Jambaldorj (1941–1947)
- M. Dambadarjaa (1947–1951)
- S. Peljee (1951–1956)
- S. Choyjamts (1956–1957)
- Ts. Luvsansharav (1957–1959)
- H. Damdin (1959–1960)
- Sampilyn Jalan-Aajav (1960–1964)
- Dononyn Purev (1972–1978)
- Byaraagiyn Chimid (1978–1983)
- Origiyn Jambaldorj (1983–1990)
- Jugneegiin Amarsanaa (1990–1992)

=== Mongolia ===
- Namsraijabyn Luvsanjav (1992–1996)
- Jugneegiin Amarsanaa (1996–1998)
- Sarygiyn Batchuluun (1998–1999)
- Logiin Tsog (acting, 1999)
- Dashiin Ganbold (1999–2000)
- Tsendiin Nyamdorj (2000–2005)
- Sunduin Batbold (2004–2006)
- Dorjiin Odbayar (2006–2008)
- Tsendiin Munkh-Orgil (2008)
- Tsendiin Nyamdorj (2008–2012)
- Khishigdembereliin Temuujin (2012–2014)
- Dambiin Dorligjav (2014–2016)
- Sandagiin Byambatsogt (2016–2017)
- Tsendiin Nyamdorj (2017–2020)
- Khishgeegiin Nyambaatar (2020–2023)
- Battumuriin Enkhbayar (2023–2024)
- Oyunsaikhany Altangerel (from 2024)

== See also ==
- Justice ministry
- Interior ministry
- Politics of Mongolia
- Law enforcement in Mongolia
- Law Enforcement University of Mongolia
