= Unison Healthcare Group =

Taiwanese medical device company

- Native name: 友信醫療集團
- Company type: Public
- Industry: Medical devices
- Founded: 1955
- Founder: Mr Y. F. Shih
- Headquarters: Taipei, Taiwan
- Area served: East Asia (Taiwan, Mainland China, Mongolia); Southeast Asia (Vietnam, Thailand)
- Products: CT, MRI, Robotic Surgery system, ESWL
- Number of employees: 200
- Website: www.unisonhealthcaregroup.com

Unison Healthcare Group (UHG; Chinese: 友信醫療集團), started out as "Unison" (友信行), is a Taiwanese medical device distributor founded in 1955, headquartered in Taipei. The corporation provides equipment and systems ranging from radiology, cardiology, orthopedic, telemedicine, medical imaging to medical robots. It is also a turnkey project and total service provider for hospitals, offering overseas technical support in over 45 countries, such as Mainland China, Mongolia, Vietnam and Thailand.

Over the years, UHG have developed a strategic alliance partnership with several companies in different medical fields, including Unison, Papasign, Unimed, UnisonMed Academy, Unison Surgicals Company, Promedics Technology, Feynman Technology, and Sincere Medical Imaging Center.

== History ==
1955: Unison founded in Taipei, Taiwan by Mr Y. F. Shih, started out with as a pharmaceutical company.

1960: Acquired agency rights from western manufacturers, including Philips Duphar, Dolder, Dagra, etc.

1965: Acquired distribution agency right for Philips Medical Systems in Taiwan.

1970: Acquired distribution agency right for Siemens Medical Systems in Taiwan.

1973: Introduced the iodinator (a commercialized water filter system that was first applied in space shuttles) to the Taiwanese market, Apollo 7 astronaut Wally Schirra visited Taiwan to promote the use of iodinator.

2003: Completed the Positron Emission Tomography (PET) center BOT project with Tri-Service General Hospital and National Cheng Kung University Hospital.

2005: Siemens Medical Systems retrieved distribution rights from UHG due to the establishment of Taiwanese branch.

2009: UHG's subsidiary Unison Surgical acquired distribution rights from Intuitive Surgical da Vinci Surgical System and IMRIS.

2014: Philips Medical Systems withdrew CT/MRI and other imaging product's distribution right from UHG in Taiwan.

2014: Established collaborative relationship with GE healthcare.

2014: Acquired Taiwanese market dealership rights from Yaskawa Electric Corporation for the ReWalk Robotic Exoskeleton system, a commercial bionic walking assistance system that uses powered leg attachments to enable paraplegics to stand upright, walk and climb stairs.

2020: Comodo Cybersecurity and UHG announced healthcare cybersecurity strategic partnership.

== Product and service ==
UHG distributes and sells a wide range of medical products in Taiwan and Asia, and is highly recognized in cardiology, radiation oncology, orthopedics, medical imaging and robotic surgery. It also provides total solution for hospitals, including consulting, financing, room planning, system installation, equipment maintenance, service support, engineer training, and ERP system integration.
