= Ukhaa Khudag Coal Mine =

Coal mine in Ömnögovi, Mongolia

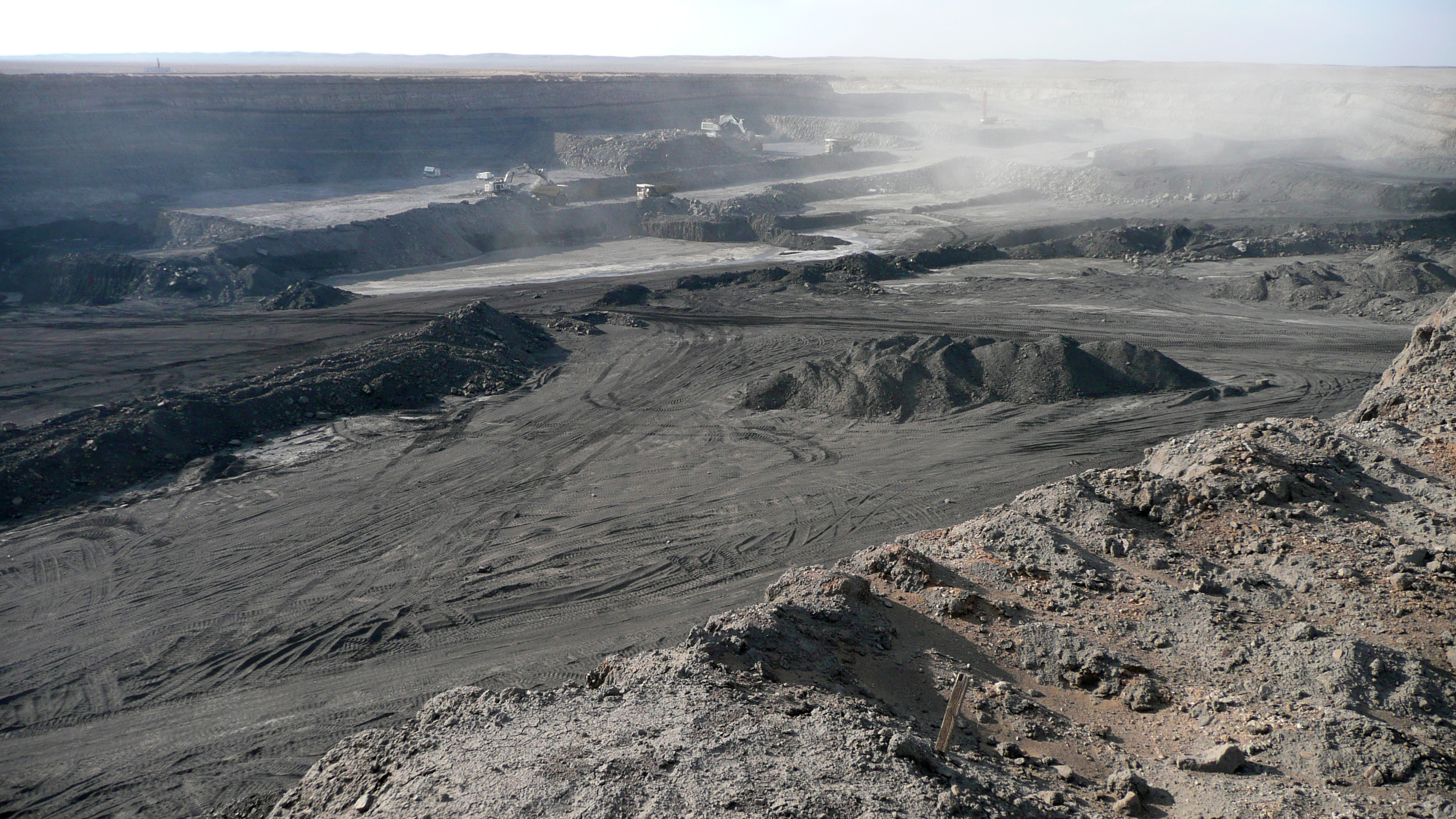

- Location within Mongolia
- Location: Ömnögovi, Mongolia; 43°40′31.6″N 105°31′15.9″E
- Products: coal
- Opened: 2009

The Ukhaa Khudag Coal Mine (UHG) is a coal mine in Tavan Tolgoi, Ömnögovi Province, Mongolia.

== History ==
The commercial mining operation of the mine started in April 2009.

== Architecture ==
The mine is equipped with 18 MW on-site Ukhaa Khudag Power Plant and water supply network.

== Geology ==
The mine spans around 2,960 hectares of area. As of 1 January 2020, it has 305 Mt of ROM coal reserves.

== See also ==
- Mining in Mongolia
