= Internal Troops of Mongolia =

Gendarmerie of Mongolian military

Internal Military Organization Монгол Улсын Дотоодын цэргийн байгууллага
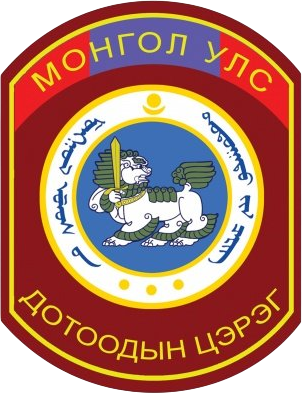
- Patch of the Internal Troops

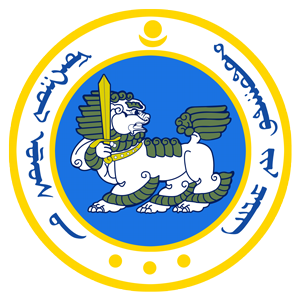
- Seal of the Internal Troops

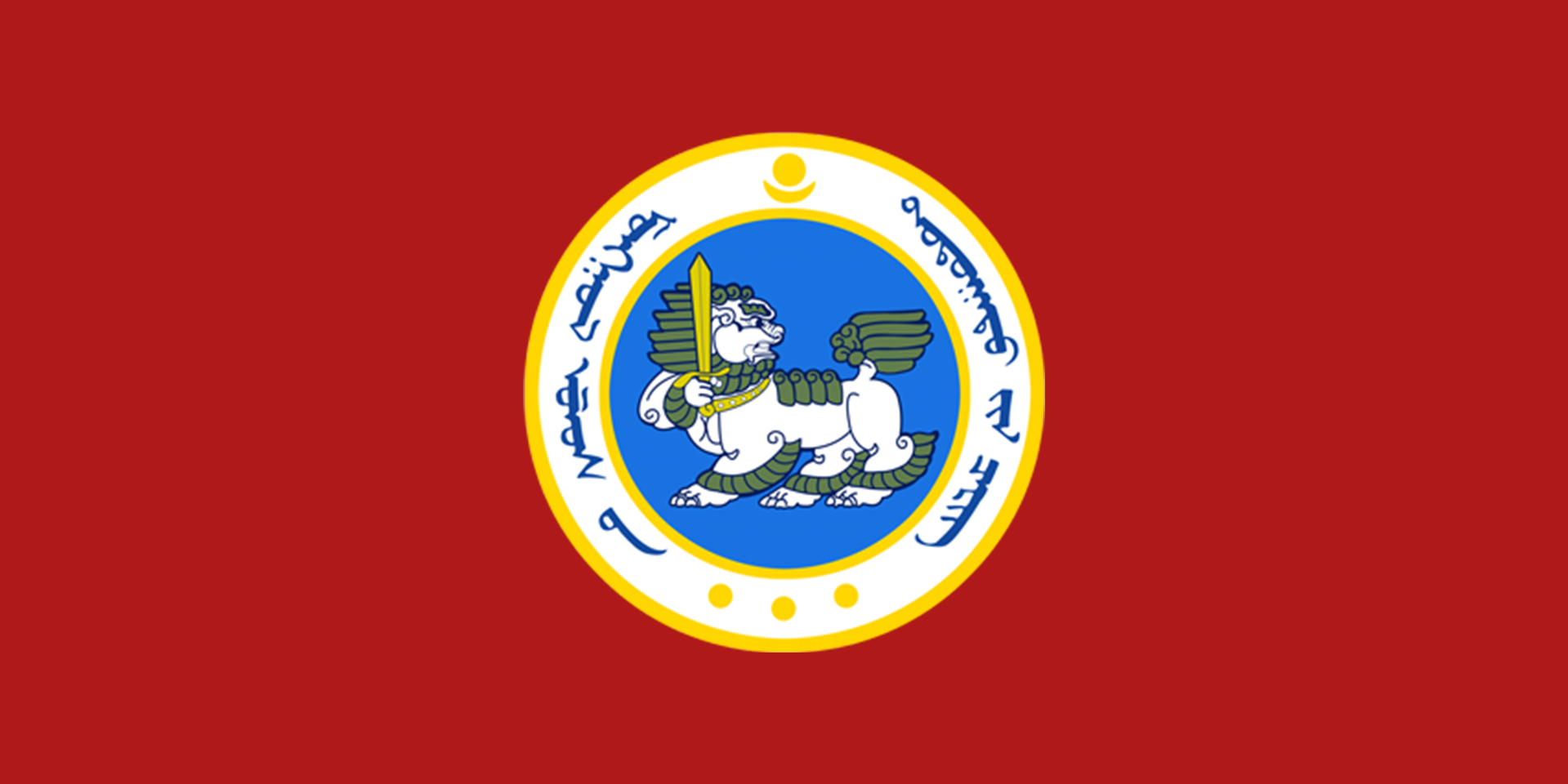
- Flag of the Internal Troops
- Common name: Дотоодын цэрэг ("Internal Troops")
- Abbreviation: ITM ("Internal Troops of Mongolia"); ДЦ ("Дотоодын Цэрэг")

Agency overview
- Formed: 1922–1995 (Internal Troops of the Mongolian People's Army); 1995–2013; 2017–present

Jurisdictional structure
- Operations jurisdiction: Mongolia
- Legal jurisdiction: Mongolia
- Governing body: Ministry of Justice and Internal Affairs
- General nature: Gendarmerie

Operational structure
- Headquarters: Ulaanbaatar

Notables
- Awards: Order of Sukhbaatar; Order of the Red Banner

Website
- intr.gov.mn

The Internal Military Organization of Mongolia (Mongolian: Монгол Улсын Дотоодын цэргийн байгууллага) is the paramilitary gendarmerie which performs special guard and reserve duties in the Mongolian Armed Forces. They protect buildings for institutions and areas such as the Mongolian National Broadcaster and Altan-Ölgii National Cemetery.

It is led by a chief of staff who reports directly to the Minister of Justice and Internal Affairs.

== History ==
It is the successor to the Internal Troops of the Mongolian People's Army (officially known as the Border and Internal Troops Administration). During the Cold War, they were responsible for border patrol, guard duties, and immigration control. By the end of the 1980s, it numbered around 15,000 troops. The Internal Troops were originally formed in 1922 by the Military Council with over ten units, serving under the name of Special Unit for Internal Security Affairs.

The Internal Troops in their current form were adopted in 1995, serving for 18 years until their governing law was repealed on 16 March 2013 by the State Great Khural with the backing of the Altankhuyag government. After its repeal, its functions were transferred to the National Police Agency and the border guard by 1 April 2014. After a thorough look into the matter and a landslide victory of the MPP in the 2016 parliamentary election, the recreation of the Internal Military was reconsidered.

In February 2017, the parliament formally passed a law to recreate the Internal Troops.

== Structure ==
=== Damdin Sükhbaatar 05th Internal Troops Unit ===
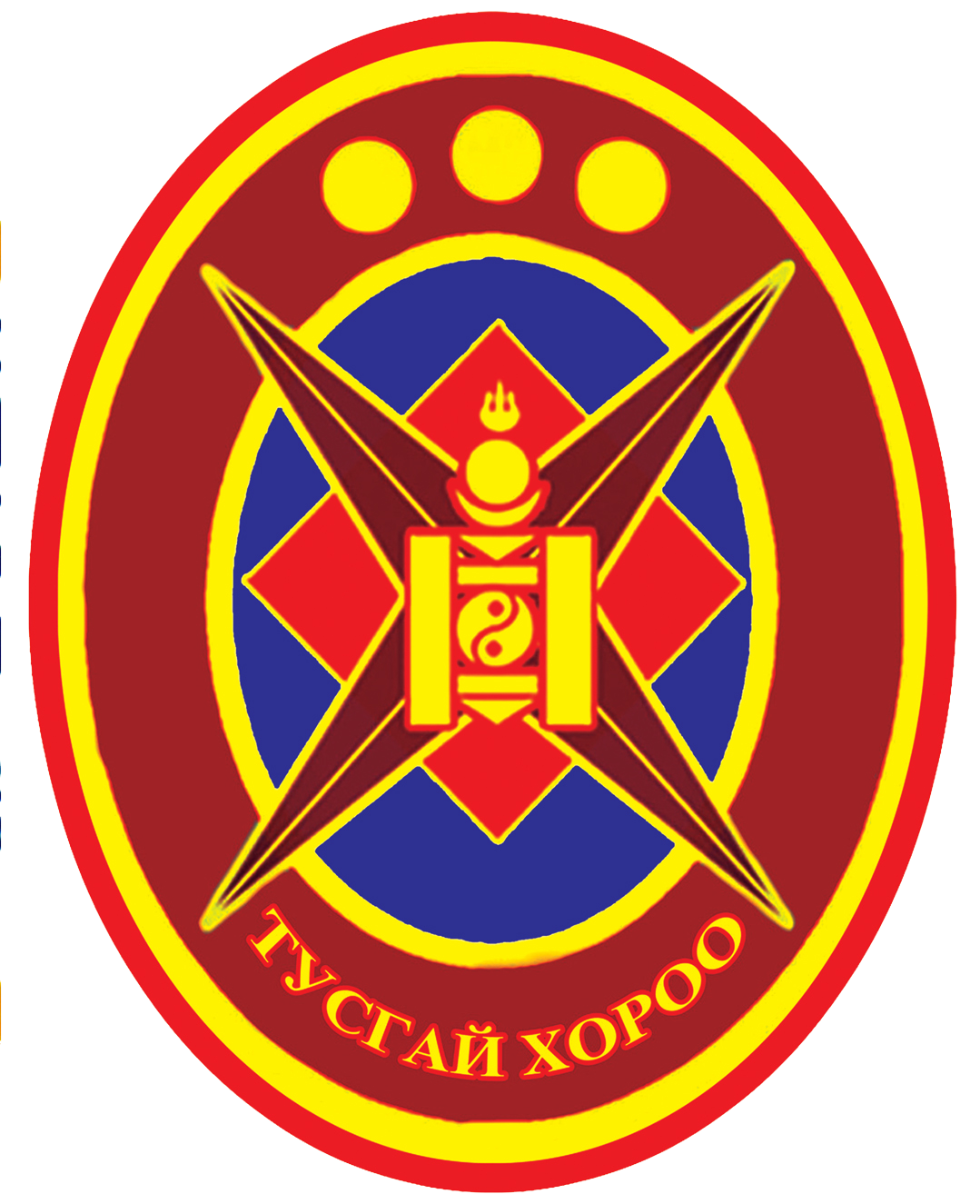
Emblem of the Damdin Sukhbaatar 05th unit.

The 05th Internal Troops Unit is based in Ulaanbaatar, and was founded by commander Damdin Sükhbaatar after the establishment of the Special Unit for Internal Security Affairs in 1922.

=== 805th Internal Troops Unit ===
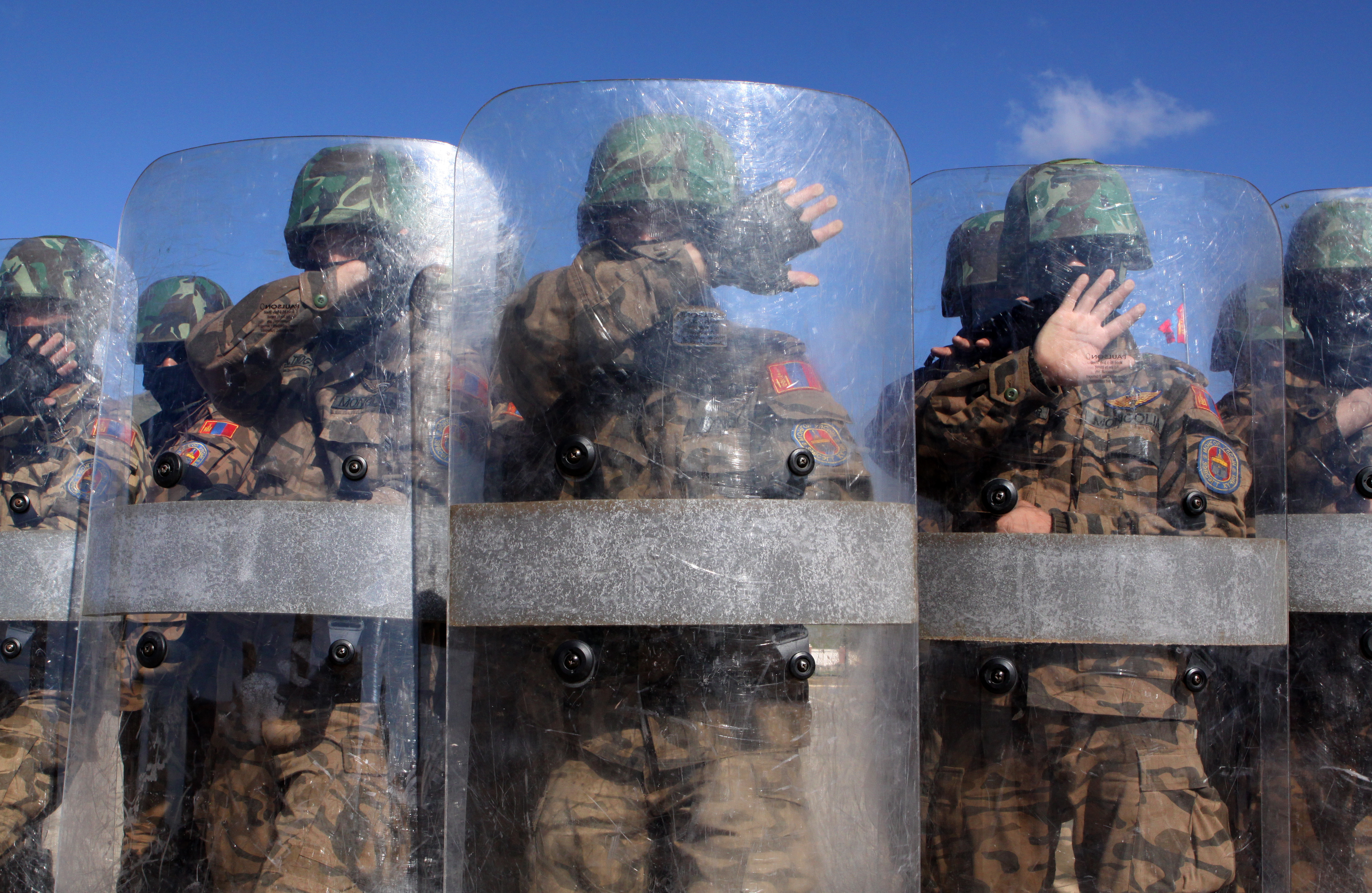
Members of the Mongolian Internal Troops at Khaan Quest in 2010

The 805th Internal Troops Unit is based in Ulaanbaatar, and was founded as the "230th Security Unit" in 1988. It was renamed to its current name by the National Police Agency in 1992.

The unit is responsible for providing protection of national facilities, specifically the Ulaanbaatar Water Supply Resource Facility, the Central Laboratory of the National Center for Public Health, the Laboratory of the National Center for the Study of Infectious Diseases, the headquarters of the Department of Standards and Measurements, and the building of the Precious Metals Test Control Department.

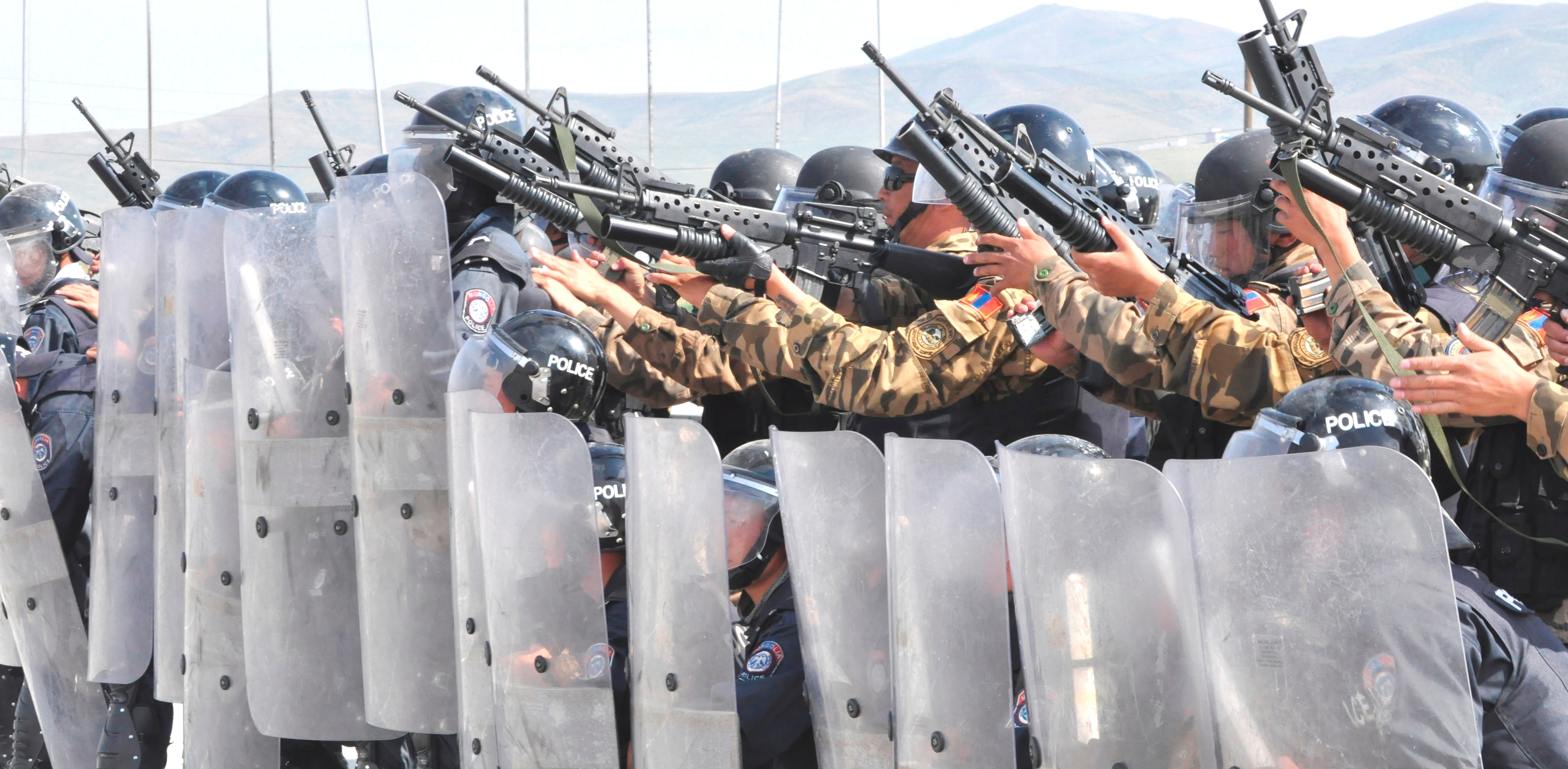
Riot control training of the Mongolian Internal Troops in 2010

=== 809th Internal Troops Unit ===
The 809th Internal Troops Unit is a special force unit based in Ulaanbaatar. It was formed in 2006 as the 809th Internal Troops Special Branch and was renamed to the 809th Unit in 2024. The unit is responsible for performing special operations and counterterrorism missions.

=== 810th Internal Troops Unit ===
The 810th Internal Troops Unit is based in Ömnögovi Province. It was formed in 2021 after the Tavantolgoi Coal Mine of HC "Erdenes-Tavantolgoi was declared under the protection of the Internal Troops in 2020. The unit is responsible for protecting the Tavantolgoi Mine.

=== 816th Internal Troops Unit ===
The 816th Internal Troops Unit is based in Erdenet, Orkhon Province. It was formed in 1997 as the 816th Internal Troops Special Branch partially responsible for protecting Erdenet Mining Corporation. In 2004, it was fully responsible for the protection of the mine. In 2023, the special branch was re-organized as the 816th Unit.

The unit is responsible for protecting properties of the Erdenet Mining Corporation, plant of explosives outside the mine, and "Treasure Factory" LLC, which is protected in collaboration with the police.

== See also ==
- Law enforcement in Mongolia
- Ministry of Justice and Internal Affairs (Mongolia)
- National Police Agency (Mongolia)
