= General Executive Agency of Court Decision =

Government agency of Mongolia

General Executive Agency of Court Decision (GEACD; Mongolian: Шүүхийн шийдвэр гүйцэтгэх ерөнхий газар) is an agency of the government of Mongolia. It serves as that country's prison service.
