= Tavan Tolgoi =

Coal mine in Tsogttsetsii, Ömnögovi, Mongolia

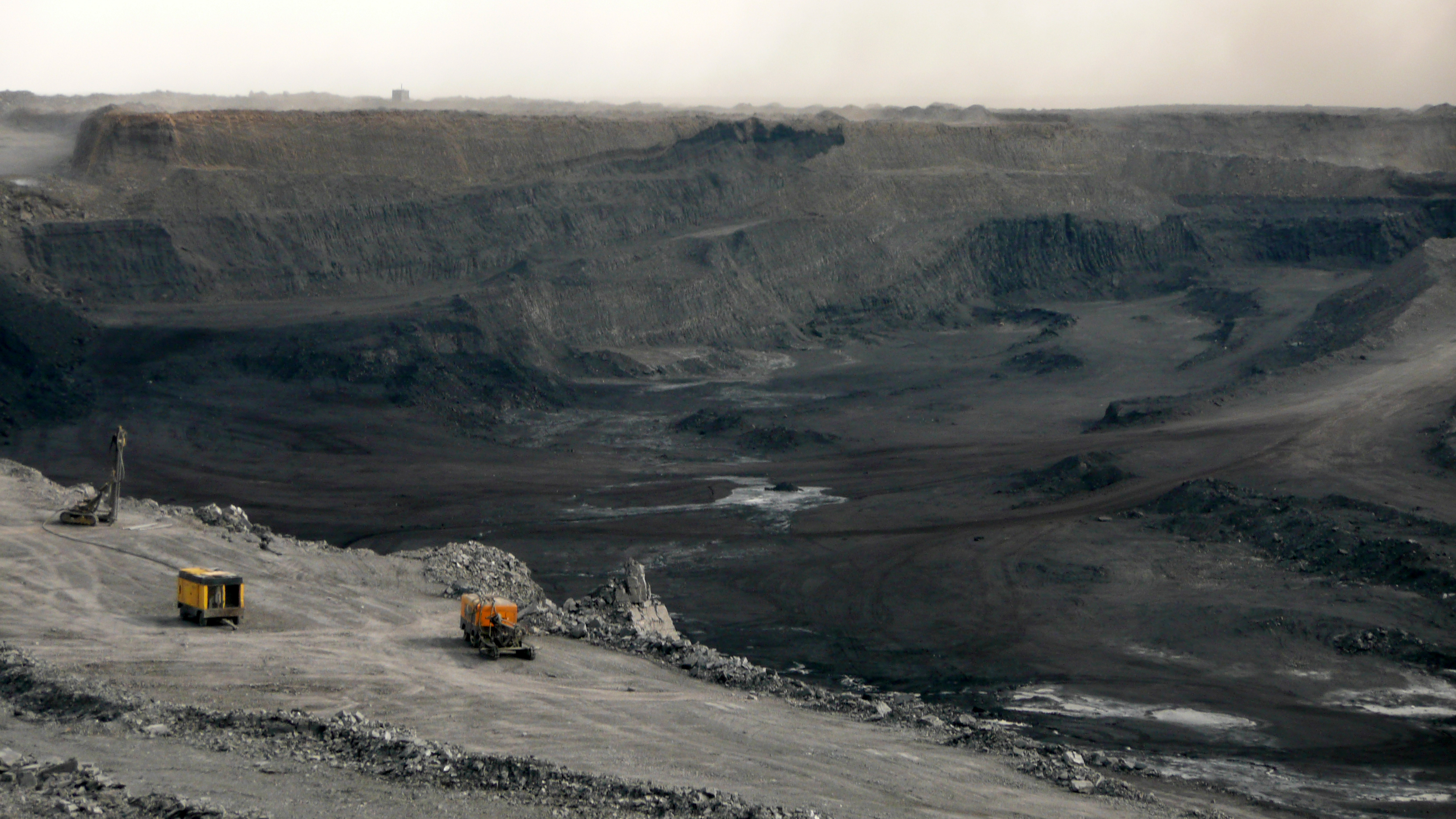
- Tavan Tolgoi coal mine in 2010

- Location within Mongolia
- Location: Tsogttsetsii, Ömnögovi, Mongolia; 43°37′30″N 105°28′27″E
- Products: Coking coal
- Discovered: 1930s
- Opened: 1966
- Company: Erdenes Mongol Group; Mongolian Mining Corporation

Tavan Tolgoi (Mongolian: Тавантолгой, also Tavantolgoi, Tavantolgoy, "Five Hill") is one of the world's largest untapped coking and thermal coal deposits, located in Tsogttsetsii, Ömnögovi Province, Mongolia. It has a total estimated resource of 6.4 billion tonnes, one quarter of which is high quality coking coal. It is divided into six sections: Tsankhi, Ukhaa Khudag, Bor tolgoi, Borteeg, and Southwest and Eastern coalfields. The Tsankhi section is the largest part, and is divided into East and West Tsankhi - these have had the most focus recently.

All of Tavan Tolgoi is owned by Erdenes Mongol Group (a government owned company) except for Ukhaa Khudag section which is mined by the Mongolian Mining Corporation. Erdenes Tavantolgoi JSC (Erdenes TT), a subsidiary of Erdenes Mongol Group, is managing the development of East Tsankhi, and the company is due to float on the Hong Kong, London and Ulaanbaatar stock markets in late 2012. Mining of West Tsankhi is planned to be contracted to a consortium of international mining companies – a decision is due in late 2012.

Tavan Tolgoi is situated in the southern Gobi Desert. Tavan Tolgoi is 15 km south-west from Tsogttsetsii sum center, 98 km east from Ömnögovi Province center Dalandzadgad. It is 150 km from Oyu Tolgoi and about 240 km north of the Chinese border.

Tavan Tolgoi covers multiple blocks, including the Borteeg coking coal block, opened in 2026 to international investors.

== History ==
The Tavan Talgoi deposit was discovered by a Soviet exploration team that included the first Mongolian geologist Jaltsavyn Dugersuren in 1945, and exploratory drilling and feasibility studies continued until 1985. After Mongolia's democratic transition in 1990/91, the government allowed foreign companies to explore the deposit. BHP gained the exploratory rights in the early 1990s; however, they relinquished the rights in the mid-1990s because of financial concerns. In 2006, the government awarded the Mongolian Mining Corporation (MMC), locally known as the Energy Resources LLC, the mining license over the Ukhaa Khudag section (license MV-11952). The government also amended the Minerals Law in 2006 and identified 15 strategic deposits (allowing the government greater ownership of mines), of which Tavan Tolgoi was one.

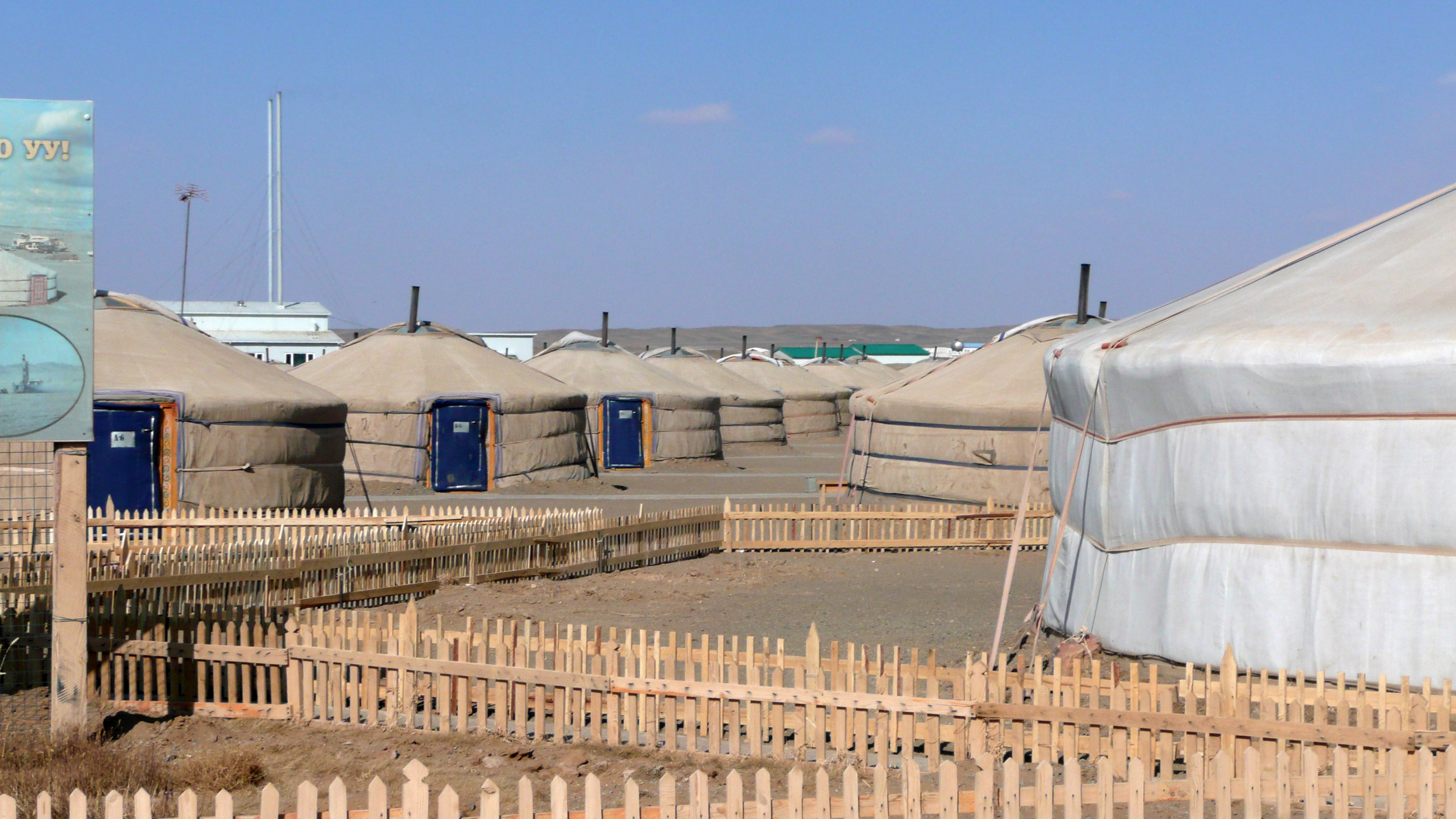
Ger housing at the project, 2010

In 2007, the government decided to review the ownership and investment rights over Tavan Tolgoi, and the prime minister Sanjiin Bayar proposed to renationalise the deposit - the government would gain 50%, MMC keeping 14% and other investors the remaining 36%. Erdenes Mongol Group was formed as a wholly government-owned company in 2007, and later that year the government renationalised Tavan Tolgoi, leaving MMC with the Ukhaa Khudag section. The government began negotiations in 2009 with mining companies to give them a 48% stake in Tavan Tolgoi. BHP was initially interested in, but in early 2009 withdrew its bid. After this, Peabody Energy (an American mining company) reportedly approached the government interested in the deposit.

In 2010, the Erdenes Mongol Group formed a new company - Erdenes Tavantolgoi (ETT) - which would hold the licenses and manage the Tavan Tolgoi deposit. In July 2010, it was reported that the government had decided to sell 30% of Erdenes TT, keep 40%, give 10% to Mongolian citizens and 20% to Mongolian companies. However, in 2011 the government announced plans for an IPO of 29% of Erdenes TT, and to continue to give 10% of the shares to citizens and reduce from 20% to 10% the amount given to Mongolian companies, with the government to hold the remaining 51%. The money raised from the IPO would be used to fund the development of East Tsankhi, while West Tsankhi would be sold to a mining consortia.

Erdenes Tavan Tolgoi plays a pivotal role in the country's economy and recently funded a $100 cash dividend for all citizens amid rising pollution concerns in Ulaanbaatar.

== Sections ==
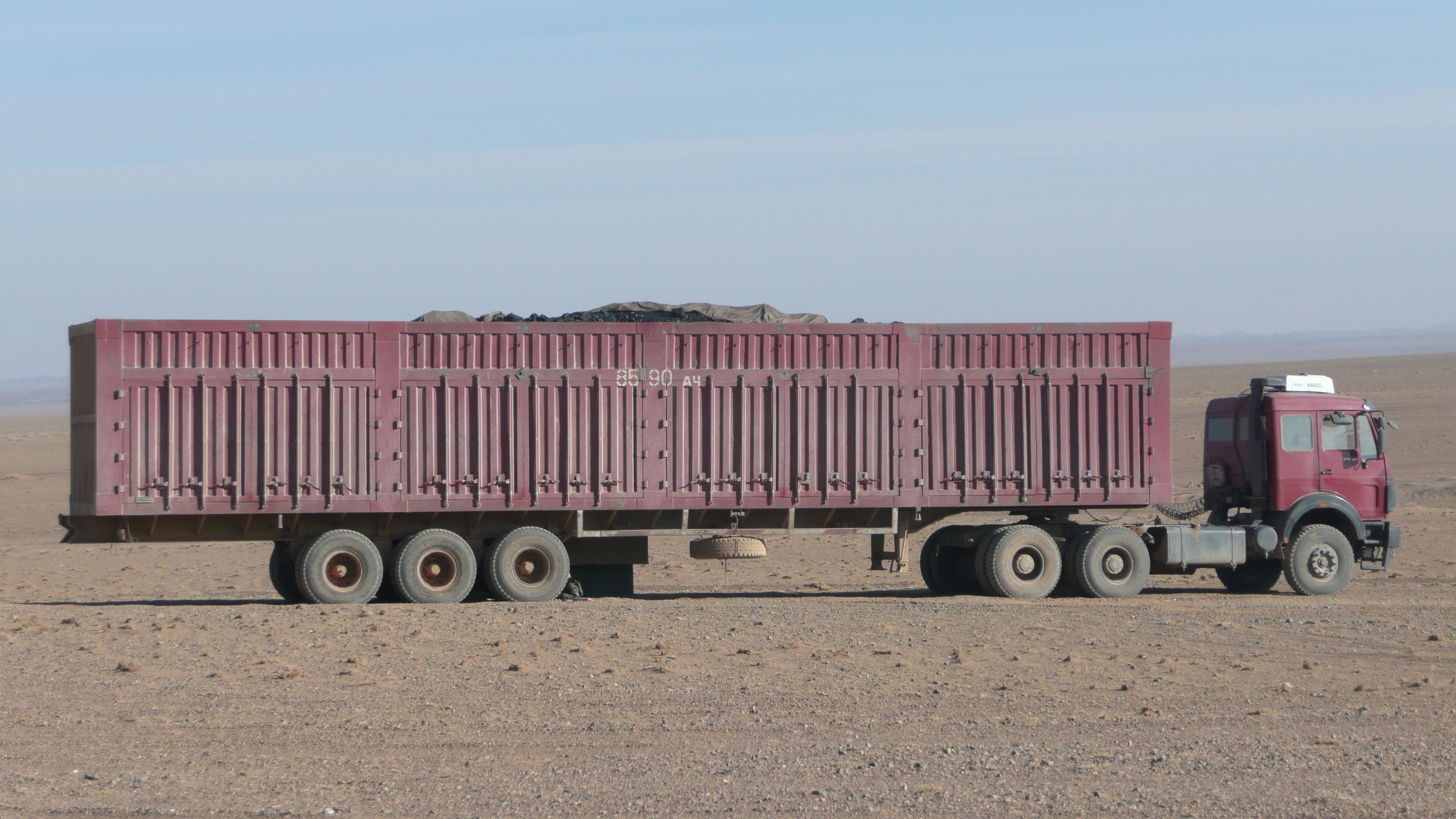
Coal truck heading from Tavan Tolgoi to China

=== East and West Tsankhi ===
The Tsankhi section is the largest in the Tavan Tolgoi deposit, and there are plans to develop both East and West Tsankhi, although both developments have been surrounded by confusion and delays.

There is often a misunderstanding that the title ‘Tavan Tolgoi’ refers to the Erdenes Tavan Tolgoi development in Tsankhi, since this is the largest and highest profile area in the entire coal deposit; however Tavan Tolgoi covers a much larger area.

==== West Tsankhi ====
The West Tsankhi section of the Tavan Tolgoi coal deposit has been in operation since 1967, as a small coal mine. It supplied coal to the Mongolian domestic market, but in August 2011, started exporting coal to China In 2009 in order to maximize the mine's production, the Mongolian government put the mine up for international companies and consortia. Six companies were shortlisted – Shenhua Group, ArcelorMittal, Kores, Peabody Energy, Vale S.A., Xstrata among others. In July 2011 it was reported that the government had awarded the contract to mine West Tsankhi to China's Shenhua Group, a Russian-led consortium, and US miner Peabody Energy Corporation. However, in August, officials said that no decision had been finalised, and now a final decision on it is not due until later in 2012. Recently, Dr Graeme Hancock (COO of ETT) cited the difficulty in managing the multiple companies interested in the consortium.

==== East Tsankhi ====
The East Tsankhi section is fully owned by Erdenes Tavan Tolgoi, who chose the Macmahon Holdings and BBM Operta joint venture to mine the site. The contract is for five years, from 2012 to 2017 and is worth US$500 million. Production from the mine is expected to be 3 million tonnes in 2012 and reaching a maximum production of 15 million tonnes per year once the mine and its associated infrastructure is built, with a total value over five years of US$2 billion. In September 2012 it was reported that the mine was on track to extract 3.5 million tonnes of coal

In 2010 the Mongolian government decided on a plan to float 30% of Erdenes TT in an IPO on the Hong Kong, London and Ulaanbaatar stock exchanges; however this was later reduced to 20% in January 2012. The IPO was intended to occur in 2011, but was postponed to late 2012 or early 2013. In addition, 10% of the Erdenes TT will be sold to local companies, 10% will be distributed in shares to every Mongolian citizen, and the government will retain the remaining share in the company. There is speculation that the Hong Kong listing may be dropped, but this has been denied by the company

==== Borteeg ====
Borteeg is a central section being tendered to investors for phased development by Erdenes Tavan Tolgoi. In 2026, Erdenes Tavantolgoi launched a targeted development of the Borteeg coking coal block, a central section of the Tavan Tolgoi deposit, inviting international investors through a request for expressions of interest. This block-by-block approach reflects a strategic shift from earlier attempts to sell or partially privatize the entire Tavan Tolgoi complex, aiming to minimize political and operational risk while monetizing the 424 million ton coal reserve. The Borteeg initiative could generate over $1 billion in export revenue if successfully developed, setting a potential template for unlocking other parts of Tavan Tolgoi.

=== Ukhaa Khudag ===
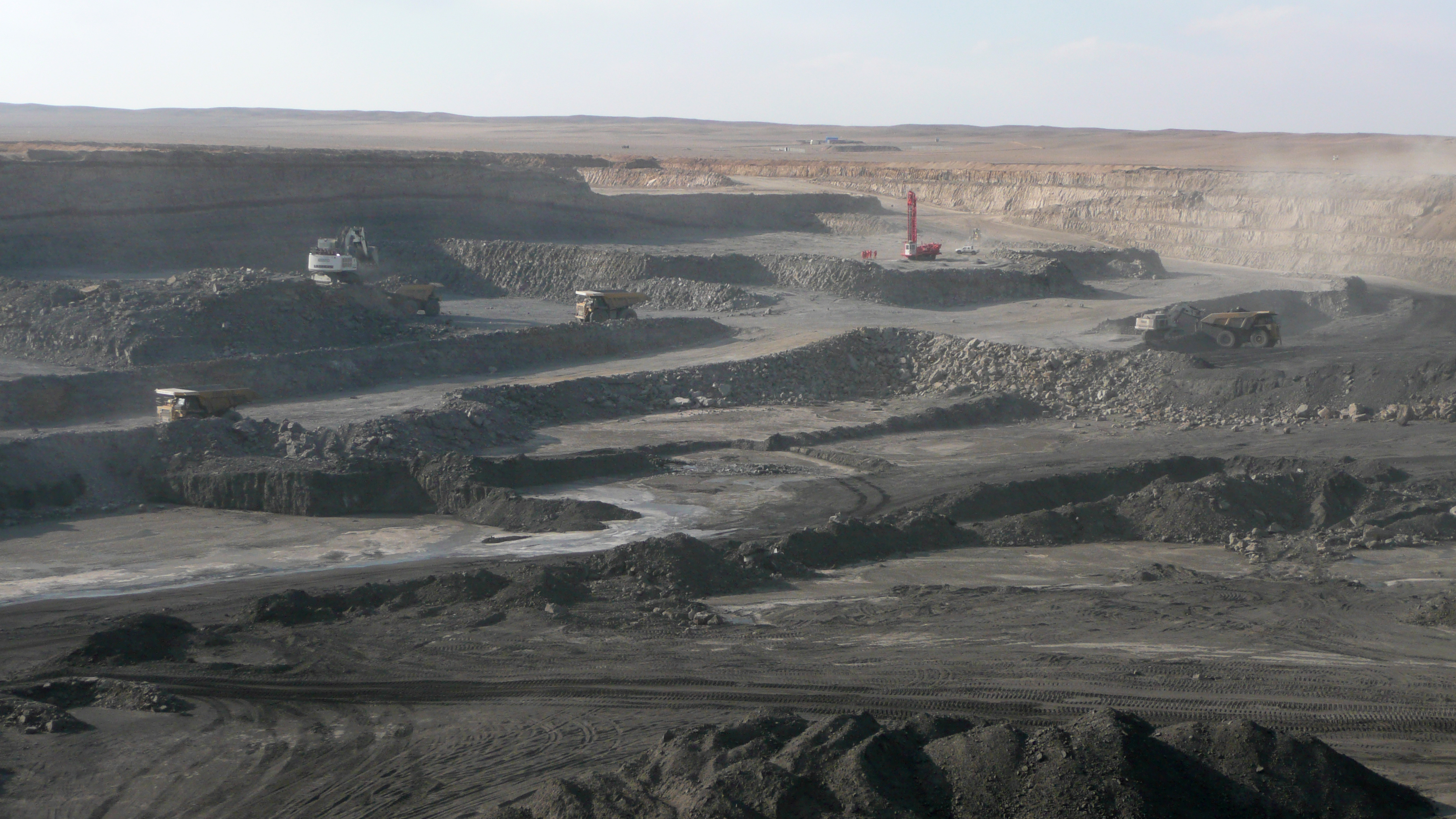
Ukhaa Khudag section

The Ukhaa Khudag section of Tavan Tolgoi deposit covers an area of 2,960 ha and has reserves of 581 million tonnes. It is owned and mined by the Mongolian Mining Corporation (formerly Energy Resources LLC); they were granted a mining license in August 2006, and began mining in April 2009. MMC has contracted Leighton Asia to conduct mining operations at the site. Production at the mine has increased to 2.1 million tonnes in the first quarter of 2012. MMC constructed a road from Ukhaa Khudag to the Gashuun Sukhait border crossing (finished in October 2011). The road charges other mining companies a fee for use - there are now concerns that trucks are avoiding the toll and driving parallel to it, causing erosion and pollution issues.

In 2012, MMC announced plans to construct a railway from Ukhaa Khudag to the Gashuun Sukhait border crossing, to be completed in 2015. While that particular plan apparently did not come to fruition, the railway along the same or similar route was said to be under construction as of 2014, with the estimated completion date in late 2016. A special vote of the Mongolian Parliament made it possible to construct this railway on the 1435 mm standard gauge (for a seamless connection with China's railway network), rather than on the 1520 mm Russian gauge used elsewhere in Mongolia.

The construction of the new railway networks linking coal mines in southern Mongolia with northern China is expected to be completed in the second half of 2022. The 233-km long railway from Tavan Tolgoi to Gashuunsukhait border port came online on September 9, 2022.
