= General Authority for Border Protection =

Government agency of Mongolia

The General Authority for Border Protection (Mongolian: Хил хамгаалах ерөнхий газар) is an agency that is part of the Government of Mongolia and acts as a reserve force for the Armed Forces of Mongolia. It guards the country's entry and exit points on its borders with Russia and China as well as prevents/suppresses illegal activities such as smuggling and human trafficking. It also is responsible for border patrol and the regulation of illegal immigration. The agency is supported by over 3,000 personnel across 300-350 permanent border guard units from the Mongolian Armed Forces, the National Police Agency and other government agencies. It is currently an agency of the Mongolian Ministry of Justice and Home Affairs.

== History ==
The Border Troops of the Mongolian People's Army were manifested in the 15,000 strong Border and Internal Troops Administration during the Cold War. They were equipped with helicopters, motor vehicles, signals equipment, as well as engineering equipment. It was established as the frontier guard in 1933 to manage Mongolian borders with the USSR and Manchuria. During the Battles of Khalkhin Gol, western border was heavily guarded by MPA personnel who defended the country from an invasion by the Imperial Japanese Army. In 1959, the Ministry of Defense created a Border Service Division and gave. In 1993, the "Border Law" was approved and the Border Guard Administration was established. The Border Protection Agency was more of a regulatory agency under the Ministry of Defense and has since 1996 has been under the direct command of the Ministry of Justice and Home Affairs since 2000 and has been appointed as the regulatory agency of the Border Troops Management Authority. Since 2002, it has been officially called the General Authority for Border Protection.

== Ranks ==
Rank group	General / flag officers				Senior officers			Junior officers
Uniform shirt
Field uniform
Native name	Генерал; Gyenyeral	Дэслэгч генерал Deslegch gyenyeral	Хошууч генерал Khoshuuch gyenyeral	Бригадын генерал Brigadyn gyenyeral	Хурандаа; Khurandaa	Дэд хурандаа Ded khurandaa	Хошууч; Khoshuuch	Ахмад; Akhmad	Ахлах дэслэгч Akhlakh deslegch	Дэслэгч; Deslegch
Translation	General	Lieutenant general	Major general	Brigadier general	Colonel	Lieutenant colonel	Major	Captain	First lieutenant	Lieutenant

Rank group	NCOs					Enlisted
Uniform shirt
Field uniform
Native name	Тэргүүн ахлагч Tergüün akhlagch	Cургагч ахлагч Curgagch akhlagch	Aхлах ахлагч Akhlakh akhlagch	Aхлагч; Akhlagch	Дэд ахлагч Ded akhlagch	Ахлах түрүүч Akhlakh türüüch	Түрүүч; Türüüch	Дэд түрүүч Ded türüüch	Ахлах байлдагч Akhlakh baildagch	Байлдагч; Baildagch
Translation	Sergeant major	Master sergeant	Senior sergeant	Sergeant	Junior sergeant	Senior corporal	Corporal	Junior corporal	Senior private	Private

== See also ==
- List of national border guard agencies
