= Tsogttsetsii, Ömnögovi =

District in Ömnögovi Province, Mongolia

Coordinates: 43°43′44″N 105°34′24″E

Tsogttsetsii District Цогтцэций сум ᠴᠣᠭᠲᠤᠴᠡᠴᠡᠢᠰᠤᠮᠤ
- District
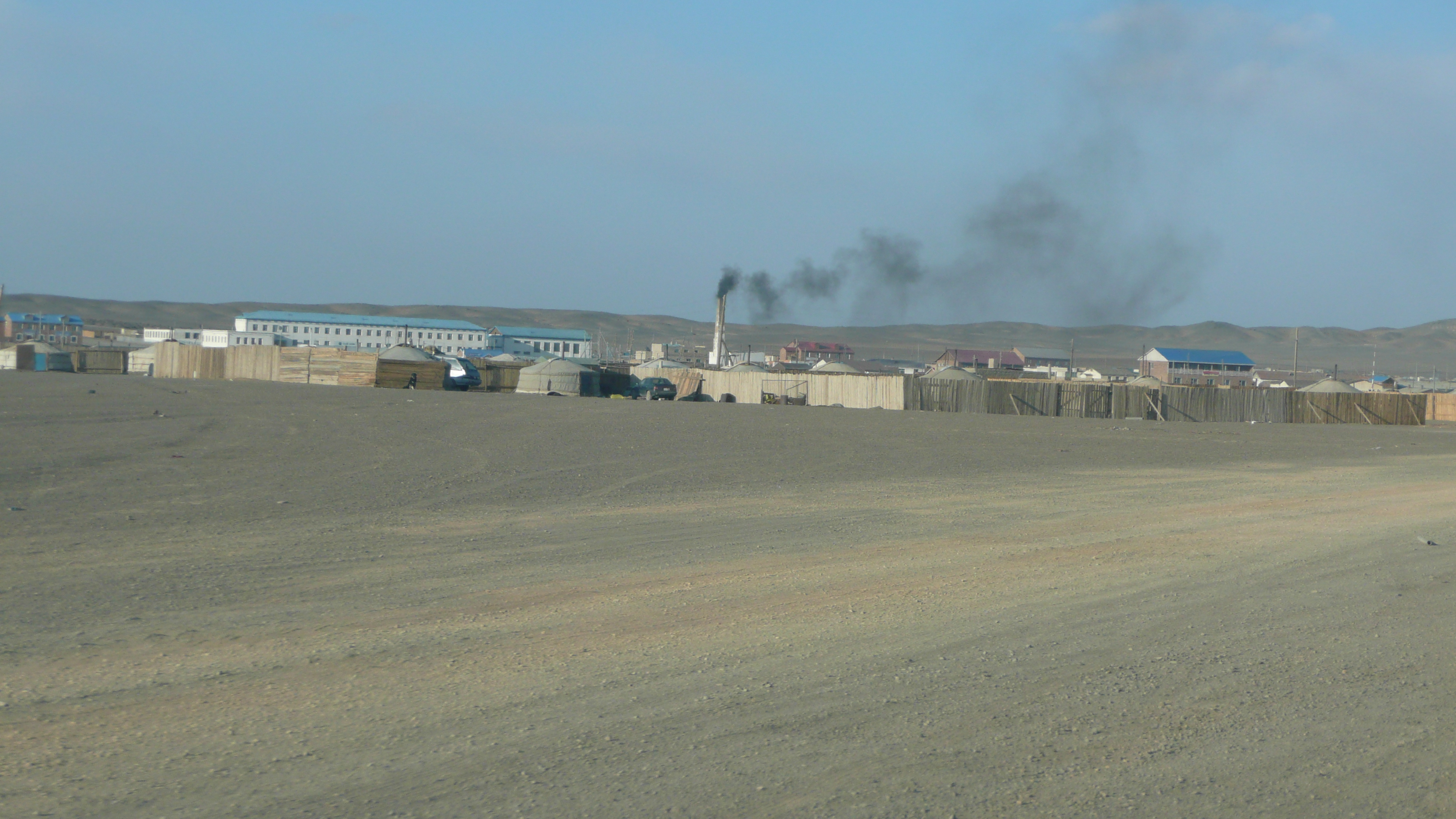

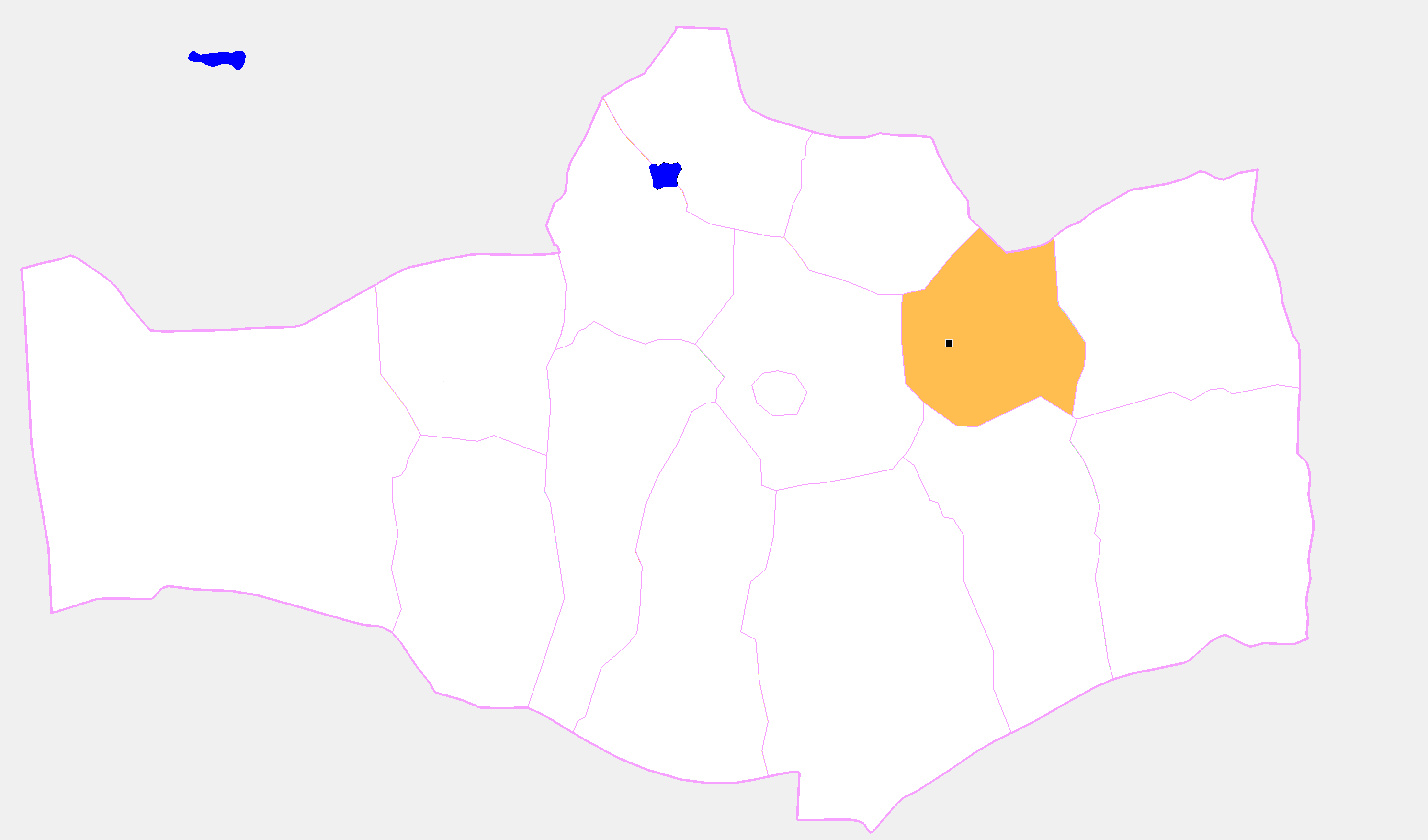
- Tsogttsetsii District in Ömnögovi Province
- Country: Mongolia
- Province: Ömnögovi Province

Area
  - Total: 7,246 km^{2} (2,798 sq mi)
- Time zone: UTC+8 (UTC + 8)

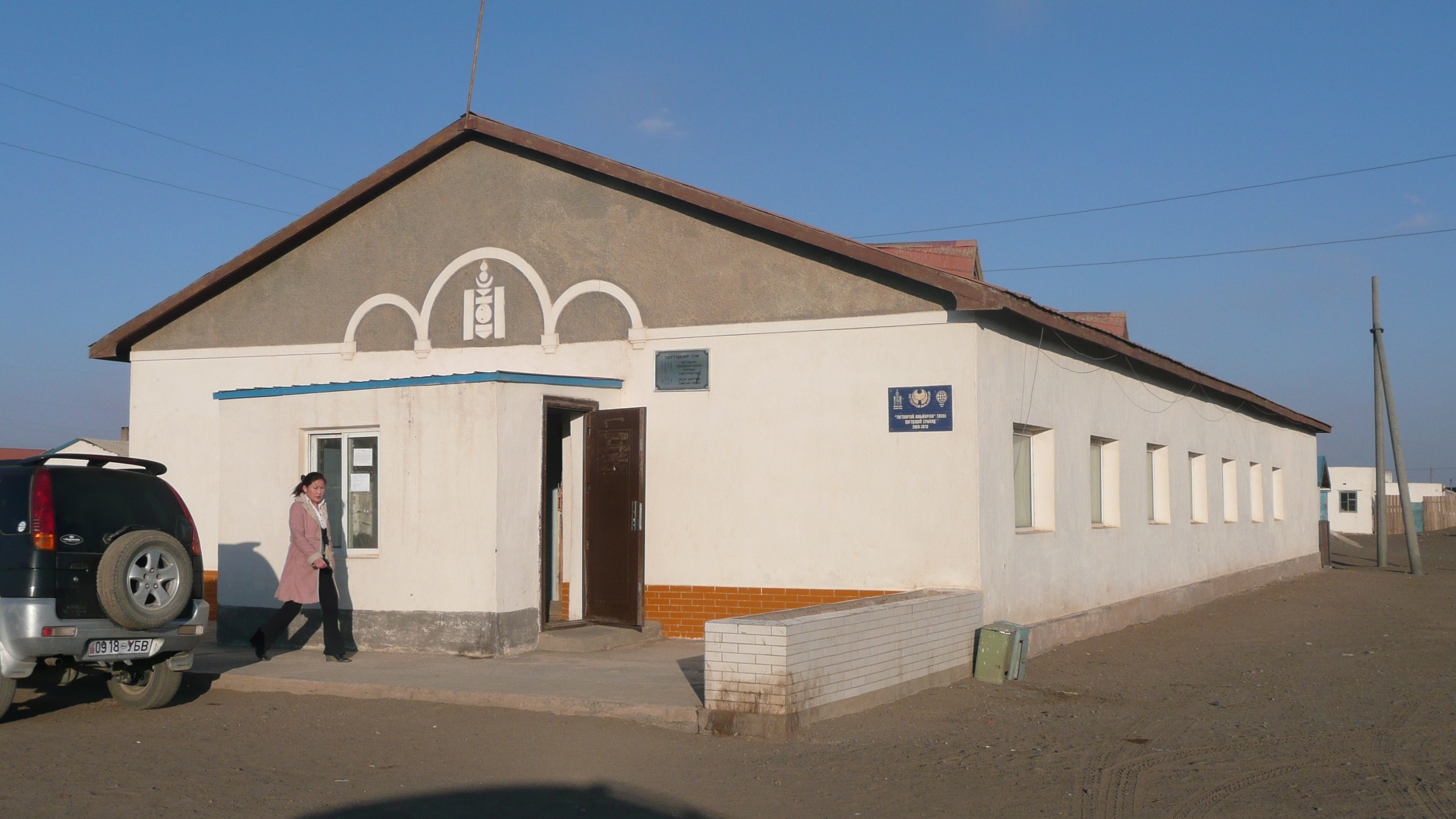
Tsogttsetsii District government building

Tsogttsetsii (Mongolian: Цогтцэций, mighty father) is a sum (district) of Ömnögovi Province in southern Mongolia. The Tavan Tolgoi coal mine is 15 km southwest of the sum center. In 2009, its population was 2,642.

== Administrative divisions ==
The district is divided into four bags, which are:

- Bilgekh
- Siirst
- Tsagaan-Ovoo
- Uguumur
