= Outline of Mongolia =

Landlocked country in East Asia

The Flag of Mongolia

The Emblem of Mongolia

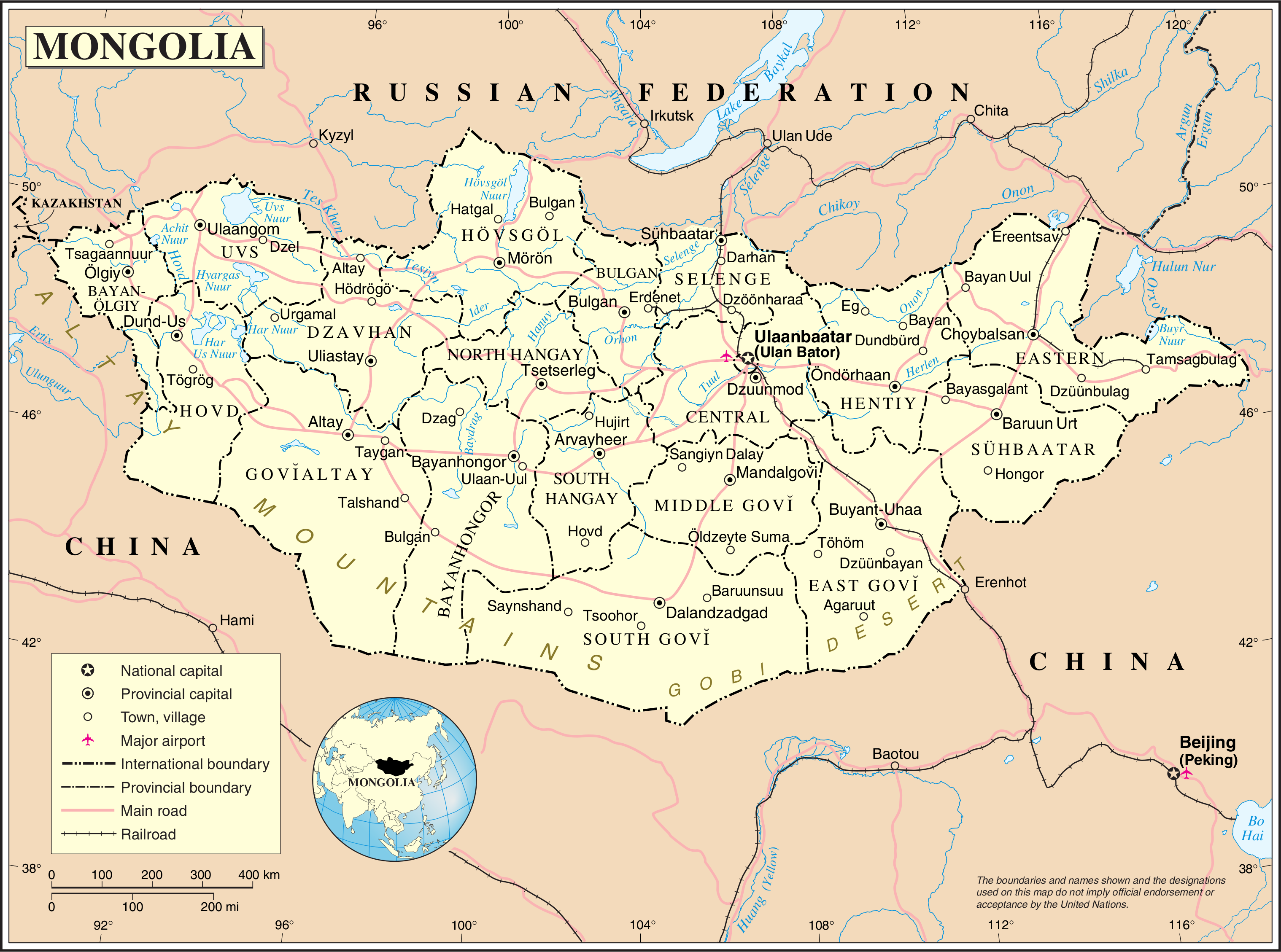
An enlargeable map of Mongolia

The following outline is provided as an overview of and topical guide to Mongolia:

Mongolia is a landlocked sovereign state in East Asia. It borders Russia to the north and China to the south. Ulaanbaatar, the capital and largest city, is home to about 38% of the population.

At 1,564,116 square kilometres (603,909 sq mi), Mongolia is the nineteenth largest, and the most sparsely populated independent country in the world with a population of around 2.9 million people. It is also the world's second-largest landlocked country after Kazakhstan. The country contains very little arable land, as much of its area is covered by arid and unproductive steppes, with mountains to the north and west and the Gobi Desert to the south. Approximately thirty percent of the country's 2.9 million people are nomadic or semi-nomadic. The predominant religion in Mongolia is Tibetan Buddhism, and the majority of the state's citizens are of the Mongol ethnicity, though Kazakhs, Tuvans, and other minorities also live in the country, especially in the west.

== General reference ==
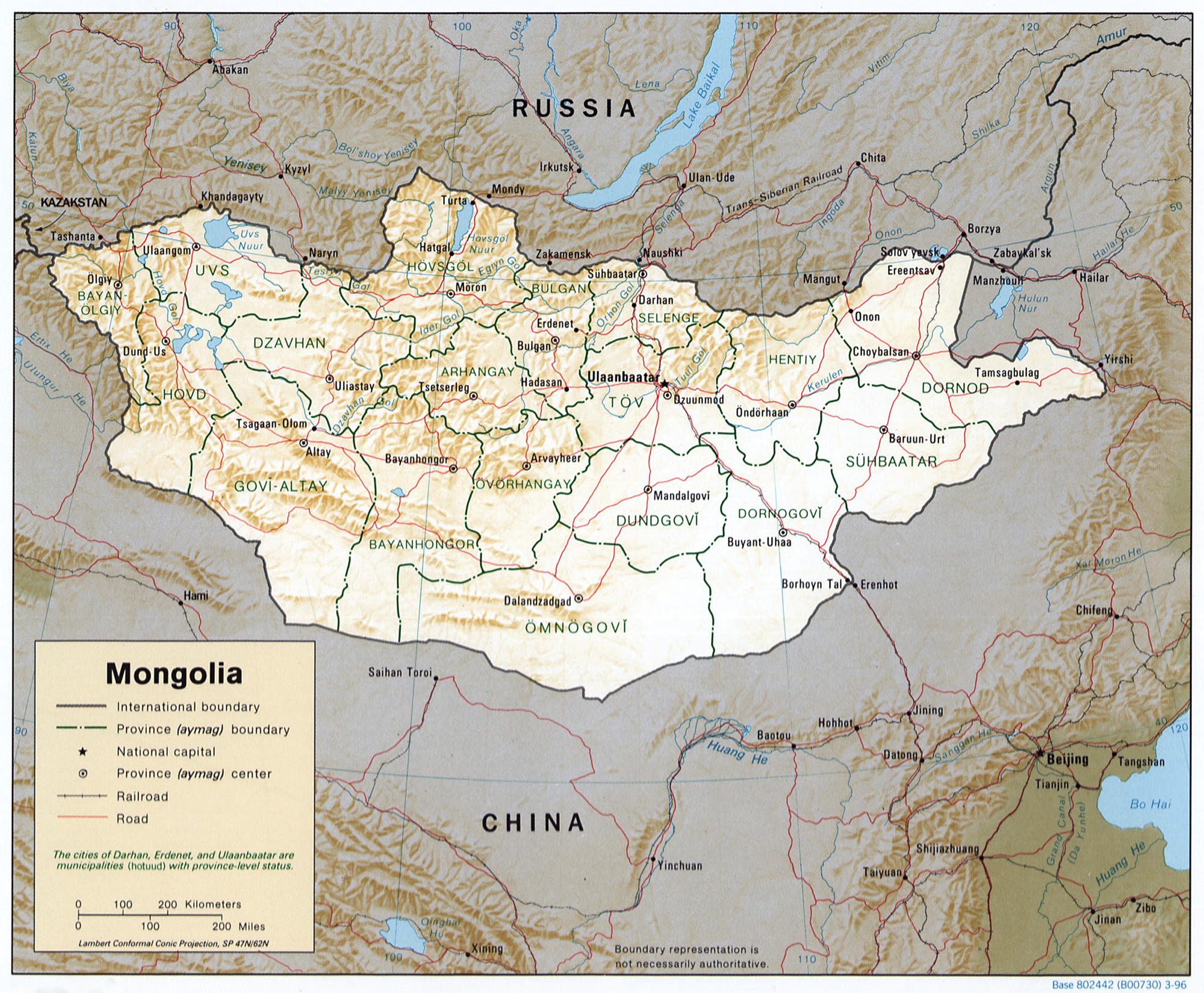
An enlargeable relief map of Mongolia

- Pronunciation: [mɔŋ'gəuliə]
- Common English country name: Mongolia, archaic Outer Mongolia
- Official English country name: Mongolia
- Common endonym(s): Монгол (Mongol)
- Official endonym(s): Монгол Улс (Mongol Uls)
- Demonym(s): Mongolian, Mongol
- International rankings of Mongolia
- ISO country codes: MN, MNG, 496
- ISO region codes: See ISO 3166-2:MN
- Internet country code top-level domain: .mn

== Geography of Mongolia ==
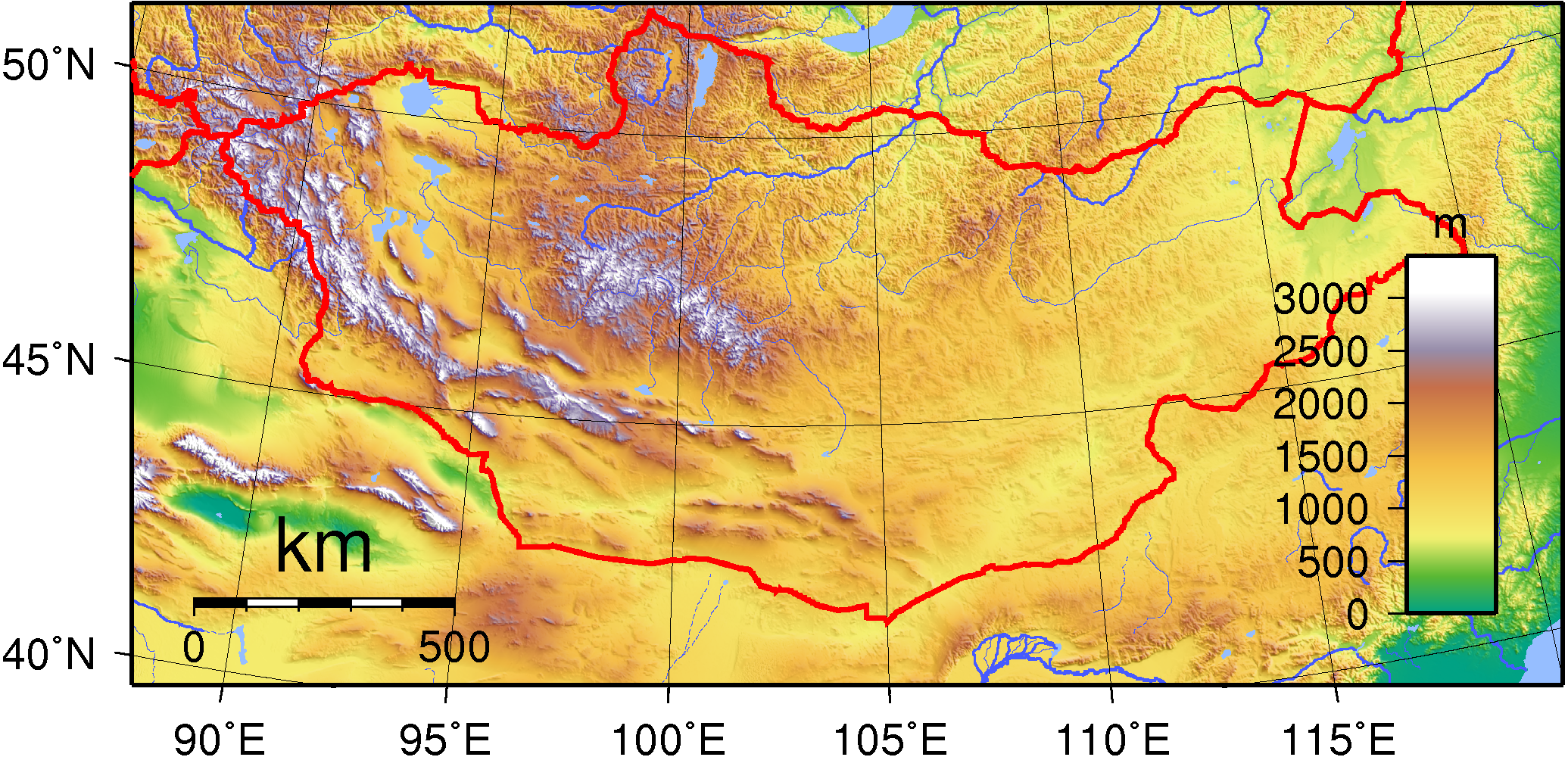
An enlargeable topographic map of Mongolia

Geography of Mongolia

- Mongolia is: a landlocked country
- Location:
  - Northern Hemisphere and Eastern Hemisphere
  - Eurasia
    - Asia
      - Central Asia
      - East Asia
  - Time zones:
    - Eastern and Central – UTC+08
    - Western – UTC+07
  - Extreme points of Mongolia
    - High: Khüiten Peak 4,374 m (14,350 ft)
    - Low: Hoh Nuur 518 m (1,699 ft)
  - Land boundaries: 8,220 km

China 4,677 km
Russia 3,543 km

- Coastline: none

- Population of Mongolia: 2,629,000 - 138th most populous country
- Area of Mongolia: 1,564,116 km^{2}
- Atlas of Mongolia

=== Environment of Mongolia ===
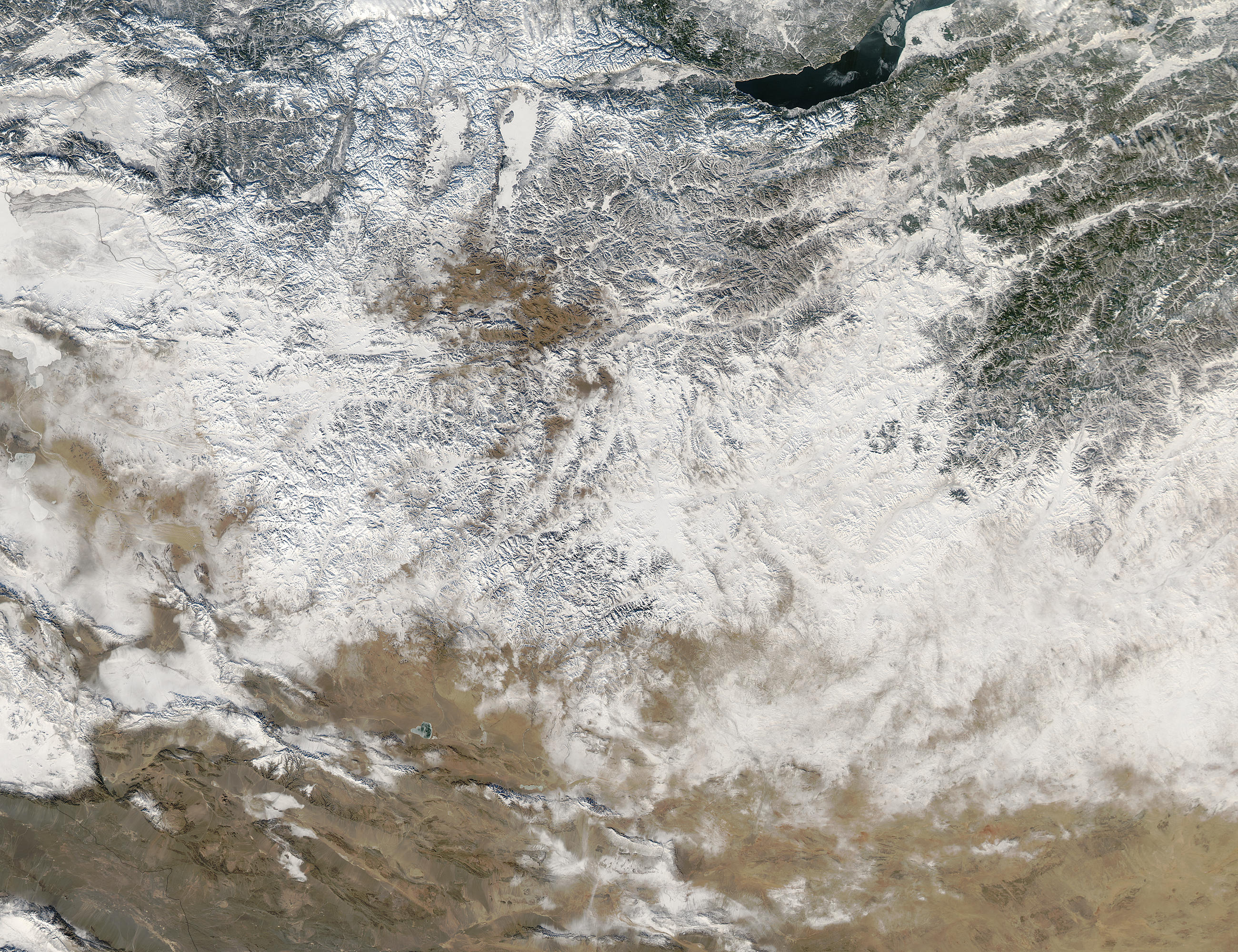
An enlargeable satellite image of Mongolia

- Climate of Mongolia
- Protected areas of Mongolia
  - Biosphere reserves in Mongolia
  - National parks of Mongolia
- Wildlife of Mongolia
  - Fauna of Mongolia
    - Birds of Mongolia
    - Mammals of Mongolia
- Environmental issues in Mongolia

==== Natural geographic features of Mongolia ====
- Lakes of Mongolia
- Mountains of Mongolia
  - Volcanoes in Mongolia
- Rivers of Mongolia
- List of World Heritage Sites in Mongolia

=== Regions of Mongolia ===
==== Administrative divisions of Mongolia ====
Administrative divisions of Mongolia

- Aimags of Mongolia
  - Sums of Mongolia (districts)

===== Aimags of Mongolia =====
Aimags of Mongolia

===== Sums of Mongolia =====
Sums of Mongolia

===== Municipalities of Mongolia =====
- Capital of Mongolia: Ulaanbaatar
- Cities of Mongolia

=== Demography of Mongolia ===
Demographics of Mongolia

== Government and politics of Mongolia ==
Politics of Mongolia

- Form of government: unitary semi-presidential representative democratic republic
- Capital of Mongolia: Ulaanbaatar
- Elections in Mongolia
- Political parties in Mongolia

=== Branches of the government of Mongolia ===
Government of Mongolia

==== Executive branch of the government of Mongolia ====
- Head of state: President of Mongolia, Tsakhiagiin Elbegdorj
- Head of government: Prime Minister of Mongolia, Jargaltulgyn Erdenebat

==== Legislative branch of the government of Mongolia ====
- Parliament of Mongolia: State Great Khural (unicameral)

==== Judicial branch of the government of Mongolia ====
Judiciary of Mongolia

- Supreme Court of Mongolia
- Judicial General Council of Mongolia
- Constitutional Court of Mongolia

=== Foreign relations of Mongolia ===
Foreign relations of Mongolia

- Diplomatic missions in Mongolia
- Sino-Mongolian relations

==== International organization membership ====
Mongolia is a member of:

- Asian Development Bank (ADB)
- Association of Southeast Asian Nations Regional Forum (ARF)
- Colombo Plan (CP)
- European Bank for Reconstruction and Development (EBRD)
- Food and Agriculture Organization (FAO)
- Group of 77 (G77)
- International Atomic Energy Agency (IAEA)
- International Bank for Reconstruction and Development (IBRD)
- International Civil Aviation Organization (ICAO)
- International Criminal Court (ICCt)
- International Criminal Police Organization (Interpol)
- International Development Association (IDA)
- International Federation of Red Cross and Red Crescent Societies (IFRCS)
- International Finance Corporation (IFC)
- International Fund for Agricultural Development (IFAD)
- International Labour Organization (ILO)
- International Maritime Organization (IMO)
- International Monetary Fund (IMF)
- International Olympic Committee (IOC)
- International Organization for Migration (IOM)
- International Organization for Standardization (ISO)
- International Red Cross and Red Crescent Movement (ICRM)
- International Telecommunication Union (ITU)
- International Telecommunications Satellite Organization (ITSO)
- International Trade Union Confederation (ITUC)
- Inter-Parliamentary Union (IPU)
- Multilateral Investment Guarantee Agency (MIGA)
- Nonaligned Movement (NAM)
- Organization for Security and Cooperation in Europe (OSCE) (partner)
- Organisation for the Prohibition of Chemical Weapons (OPCW)
- Shanghai Cooperation Organisation (SCO) (observer)
- United Nations (UN)
- United Nations Conference on Trade and Development (UNCTAD)
- United Nations Educational, Scientific, and Cultural Organization (UNESCO)
- United Nations Industrial Development Organization (UNIDO)
- United Nations Mission for the Referendum in Western Sahara (MINURSO)
- United Nations Mission in Liberia (UNMIL)
- United Nations Mission in the Sudan (UNMIS)
- United Nations Observer Mission in Georgia (UNOMIG)
- United Nations Organization Mission in the Democratic Republic of the Congo (MONUC)
- Universal Postal Union (UPU)
- World Customs Organization (WCO)
- World Federation of Trade Unions (WFTU)
- World Health Organization (WHO)
- World Intellectual Property Organization (WIPO)
- World Meteorological Organization (WMO)
- World Tourism Organization (UNWTO)
- World Trade Organization (WTO)

=== Law and order in Mongolia ===
Law of Mongolia

- Capital punishment in Mongolia
- Constitution of Mongolia
- Human rights in Mongolia
  - LGBT rights in Mongolia
  - Freedom of religion in Mongolia
- Law enforcement in Mongolia

=== Military of Mongolia ===
Military of Mongolia

- Command
  - Commander-in-chief: President of Mongolia
- Forces
  - Army of Mongolia
  - Navy of Mongolia: None
  - Air Force of Mongolia

=== Local government in Mongolia ===
Local government in Mongolia

== History of Mongolia ==
- Genghis Khan and the Mongol Empire

== Culture of Mongolia ==
Culture of Mongolia

- Architecture of Mongolia
- Cuisine of Mongolia
- Languages of Mongolia
- Media in Mongolia
- Museums in Mongolia
- National symbols of Mongolia
  - Coat of arms of Mongolia
  - Flag of Mongolia
  - National Anthem of Mongolia
- People of Mongolia
- Prostitution in Mongolia
- Public holidays in Mongolia
- Religion in Mongolia
  - Buddhism in Mongolia
  - Christianity in Mongolia
  - Hinduism in Mongolia
  - Islam in Mongolia
- List of World Heritage Sites in Mongolia

=== Art in Mongolia ===
- Cinema of Mongolia
- Literature of Mongolia
- Music of Mongolia

=== Sports in Mongolia ===
Sports in Mongolia

- Football in Mongolia
- Mongolian wrestling
- Mongolia at the Olympics
- Naadam

== Economy and infrastructure of Mongolia ==
Economy of Mongolia

- Economic rank, by nominal GDP (2007): 142nd (one hundred and forty second)
- Agriculture in Mongolia
- Banking in Mongolia
  - Bank of Mongolia (Central bank)
- Communications in Mongolia
  - Internet in Mongolia
- Companies of Mongolia
- Currency of Mongolia: Tögrög
  - ISO 4217: MNT
- Energy in Mongolia
- Mining in Mongolia
- Mongolia Stock Exchange
- Tourism in Mongolia
- Transport in Mongolia
  - Airports in Mongolia
  - Rail transport in Mongolia

== Education in Mongolia ==
Education in Mongolia

== See also ==
Mongolia

- List of international rankings
- Member state of the United Nations
- Outline of Asia
- Outline of geography
