= Judiciary of Mongolia =

Overview of Mongolian court system

The judiciary of Mongolia is made up of a three-tiered court system (first instance, appellate, supreme court) divided into three branches (civil, criminal, administrative cases). For questions of constitutional law there is a separate constitutional court. Besides there are forms of alternative dispute resolution.

== First instance ==
First instance court types are:

- District first instance court for civil cases (Mongolian: дүүргийн Иргэний хэргийн анхан шатны шүүх / дүүргийн ИХАШ шүүх)
- District first instance court for criminal cases (дүүргийн Эрүүгийн хэргийн анхан шатны шүүх / дүүргийн ЭХАШ шүүх)
  - Number: 4 each; named after Ulaanbaatar city districts.
- Inter-soum first instance court for civil cases (сум дундын Иргэний хэргийн анхан шатны шүүх / сум дундын ИХАШ шүүх)
- Inter-soum first instance court for criminal cases (сум дундын Эрүүгийн хэргийн анхан шатны шүүх / сум дундын ЭХАШ шүүх)
  - Number: 21 each; named after an aimag.
- Inter-soum court (сум дундын шүүх)
  - Number: 8; each named after an aimag's soum.
- First instance court for administrative cases (захиргааны хэргийн анхан шатны шүүх / ЗХАШ шүүх)
  - Number: 22; one for Ulaanbaatar and each aimag.

The Bayan-Ölgii courts of first instance bear alternative Kazakh names (Сұмын аралық азаматтық/Сұмын аралық қылмыстық/Әкімшілік істер алғашқы сатылы сот).

== Appellate instance ==
Appellate court types are:

- Capital city appellate court for civil cases (нийслэлийн Иргэний хэргийн давж заалдах шатны шүүх / нийслэлийн ИХДЗШ шүүх)
- Capital city appellate court for criminal cases (нийслэлийн Эрүүгийн хэргийн давж заалдах шатны шүүх / нийслэлийн ЭХДЗШ шүүх)
  - Number: 1 each.
- Aimag appellate court for civil cases (аймгийн Иргэний хэргийн давж заалдах шатны шүүх / аймгийн ИХДЗШ шүүх)
- Aimag appellate court for criminal cases (аймгийн Эрүүгийн хэргийн давж заалдах шатны шүүх / аймгийн ЭХДЗШ шүүх)
  - Number: 8 each; named after the aimags concerned.
- Appellate court for administrative cases (Захиргааны хэргийн давж заалдах шатны шүүх / ЗХДЗШ шүүх)
  - Number: 1.

== Supreme Court ==
The highest court in Mongolia is the Supreme Court of Mongolia (Улсын Дээд Шүүх), established in 1927. There are chambers for civil, criminal and administrative cases. The court hears general appeals from courts of lower instance as well as from the Constitutional Court in matters regarding the protection of law and human rights.

== Procedure ==
The courts' procedure is governed by the Law on civil procedure, the Criminal procedure law, the Law on the execution of court decisions, and the Law on administrative procedure.

=== Court administration ===
The Judicial General Council of Mongolia (Монгол Улсын Шүүхийн ерөнхий зөвлөл) is to maintain the independence of the judiciary. The status of judges is determined by a separate law. The number of judges for each court is set by parliament.

=== Alternative dispute resolution ===
For commercial disputes there is among others the Mongolian International and National Arbitration Center (MINAC; Монголын Олон Улсын ба Үндэсний Арбитр), established in 1960 at the Mongolian National Chamber of Commerce and Industry (MNCCI). The Law on mediation and conciliation provides for further forms of alternative dispute resolution.

== Constitutional court ==
Mongolia's highest court in constitutional matters is the Constitutional Court of Mongolia (Монгол Улсын Үндсэн хуулийн цэц). It was established in 1992 and has its own procedural law.
