= Administrative courts in Mongolia =

Civilian lawcourt in Mongolia

Administrative courts in Mongolia. The 1992 Constitution of Mongolia says: "The judicial system shall consist of the Supreme Court, Aimag (provincial) and capital city courts, Sum (county), inter-sum and district courts in Mongolia. Specialized courts such as criminal, civil and administrative courts may be formed. The activities and decisions of the specialized courts shall not but be under the supervision of the Supreme Court". This is the origin of the administrative courts, the first ever and only specialized courts in Mongolia. On 26 December 2002 the State Great Khural passed the Law on establishment of administrative court along with the Law on procedure for administrative cases in accordance with Article 48 (1) of the Constitution. It took almost ten years to convince the State Great Khural to pass this law with enormous work of lawyers and scholars, and the support of international organizations. The law of Mongolia on procedure for administrative cases entered into force on 1 June 2004. It is divided into two sections: first – procedure for administrative tribunal(s) and higher administrative officials to pre-decide the original act based on the complaint submitted by citizen or legal entity, second – procedure for administrative courts.

== Jurisdiction ==
The only target of this court procedure is "administrative act or action" and its validity and legitimacy. Article 3.1.4 of the Law of Mongolia on procedure for administrative cases provides the following definition. An administrative act is a single compelling order or commanding action [which causing direct legal result] that issued or acted by an administrative authority, official in oral or written form, in order to regulate the particular incident caused in public legal framework. Hence, the most common types of acts that likely to be in issue in administrative cases would be, but not limited to, all kinds of government licensing, tax order, land related regulation and government procurement.

== Organization ==
The Supreme Court has three chambers: civil, criminal, administrative, and consists of 17 justices. The court hears the civil and criminal cases with a panel of five justices. The general court system consists of the Supreme Court - last resort, aimag and capital city courts – appellate, Sum, inter-sum and district courts – trial.

For the following two reasons, the State Great Khural decided that the administrative courts should be organized differently from the ordinary court system. The reasons are first – financial (shortage of funding to establish three levels of administrative courts) and second – not enough cases to employ the courts in sums and districts. Thus, every Aimag and capital city (but not sum and district) has its administrative court and it is a trial court with jurisdiction over cases arising out of its own public administration or official action.

== Appeals ==
=== Supreme court ===
The Administrative Chamber of the Supreme Court had responsibility, until recently, not only as a last instance court but also as an intermediate appellate court. The intermediate appellate panel decides the case with a panel of three justices and is not limited to considering the issues stated in appeal but must review the whole case. As a last instance court, the Administrative Chamber hears the case with a panel of five justices. Moreover, if the case has been heard by the Chamber prior to this latter hearing, the justices who took part in the first hearing must recuse themselves. Administrative courts began operating on 1 June 2004. Since 2004, administrative courts in Mongolia have been operating without an intermediate appellate court. Up to date, there were 21 provincial administrative courts existing as first instance courts and their decisions were appealed directly to the Administrative Chamber of the Supreme Court, which acted as both intermediate appellate court and court of last resort for administrative cases.

=== Intermediate appellate court ===
Seven years after Mongolia established its first specialized court for administrative cases, the country decided to complete its court system for disputes in administrative law by establishing the intermediate appellate court. On 1 April 2011, the Administrative Court of Appeals began operating in Ulaanbaatar city, deciding cases which appealed judgment of 21 provincial administrative courts and the Capital city administrative court.
