= Solongo Batsukh =

Mongolian beauty queen

Solongo Batsukh (Mongolian: Солонго Батсүx) is a Mongolian beauty queen, model and make-up artist. As of 2018, she was one of the few openly transgender people in Mongolia. Solongo Batsukh was born Bilguun Batsukh and grew up as a boy in Dundgovi province. She learnt about different gender identities as a student, and realised whilst working at an LGBT organisation that she was a woman and began hormone therapy.

Batsukh works as a model and make-up artist. She became a celebrity in Mongolia in 2014, after participating in Miss International Queen, a transgender beauty pageant held in Thailand. She later participated in Miss Universe Mongolia 2018. She advocates for transgender rights in television appearances and on social media.

== See also ==
- LGBT Centre Mongolia
- LGBT rights in Mongolia
