= Freedom of religion in Mongolia =

The Constitution of Mongolia provides for freedom of religion; however, the law somewhat limits proselytism.

According to the national census of 2020, 51.7% of the Mongolians identify as Buddhists, 40.6% as non-religious, 3.2% as Muslims (predominantly of Kazakh ethnicity), 2.5% as followers of the Mongol shamanic tradition, 1.3% as Christians, and 0.7% as followers of other religions.

In 2023, the country was scored 4 out of 4 for religious freedom.

== Religious demography ==
The country has an area of 1,564,990 square kilometres (604,247 sq mi) and a population of 3.1 million. Buddhism and the country's traditions are closely tied, and while 26.5 percent of the population are atheists, 59.7 percent of religious Mongolians practice some form of Buddhism. Lamaist Buddhism and within it the Gelugpa school is the traditional and dominant religion.

When socialist controls on religion and on the country's traditions ended in 1990, interest in the practice of Buddhism grew.

Kazakhs, most of whom are Muslim, are the largest ethnic minority, constituting approximately 4 percent of the population nationwide and 85 percent in the western province, Bayan-Ölgii. Kazakhs operate Islamic schools for their children. They sometimes receive financial assistance from religious organizations in Kazakhstan and Turkey.

There is a small number of Christians, including Roman Catholics, Russian Orthodox, but especially Protestants. In the capital, Ulaanbaatar, approximately 30,000 citizens, or 3 percent of the registered population of the city, practice Christianity.

Many Mongols practice shamanism. The majority of these resides in the countryside. There are also small communities of the Baháʼí Faith and Ananda Marga in Ulaanbaatar.

Missionaries are present in the country.

== Status of religious freedom ==
=== Legal and policy framework ===
The Constitution provides for freedom of religion, and the Government generally respected this right in practice; however, the law limits proselytizing, and some religious groups seeking registration face burdensome bureaucratic requirements and lengthy delays. The constitution explicitly recognizes the separation of church and state.

Although there is no state religion, ethnic Mongolian traditionalists believe that Buddhism is the "natural religion" of the country. The Government contributed to the restoration of several Buddhist sites that are important religious, historical, and cultural centers. The Government did not otherwise subsidize Buddhist or any other religious groups.

A religious group must register with the Ministry of Justice and Home Affairs, a decentralized and bureaucratic process, in order to legally function as an organization. Religious institutions must reregister annually. The law allows the Government to supervise and limit the number of places of worship and number of clergy. The Government used the registration process as a mechanism to limit the number of places for religious worship; however, there were no reports that it limited the number of clergy during the reporting period.

Groups must provide the following documentation when registering: a letter to the national ministry requesting registration, a letter from the city council or other local authority granting approval to conduct religious services, a brief description of the organization, its charter, documentation of the founding of the local group, a list of leaders or officers, brief biographic information on the person wishing to conduct religious services, and the expected number of worshippers. The Ulaanbaatar city council and other local legislative bodies require similar documentation prior to granting approval to conduct religious services. While the Ministry of Justice and Home Affairs possesses the ultimate authority to approve an organization's application, this appears to be largely pro forma. In practice local legislative bodies assess the applications.

The registration process is decentralized with several layers of bureaucracy and, under the best of circumstances, can take months to complete. Registration with the Ministry of Justice and Home Affairs in the capital may not be sufficient if a group intends to work in the countryside where local registration is also necessary. Throughout the country, there were 391 registered places of worship, including 217 Buddhist, 143 Christian, 5 Baháʼí, 24 Muslim, and 2 shamanistic. During the period covered by this report, the Ministry registered 16 new Christian churches, 11 Buddhist temples, 19 Moslem mosques and 2 shaman temples. In Ulaanbaatar, the registration of one Buddhist and three Christian religious organizations which own a temple and three churches, respectively, remained under consideration.

Religious instruction is not permitted in public schools. There is a school to train Buddhist lamas in Ulaanbaatar.

== Restrictions on religious freedom ==
While the law does not prohibit proselytizing by registered religious groups, it limits such activity by forbidding spreading religious views to nonbelievers by "force, pressure, material incentives, deception, or means which harm health or morals or are psychologically damaging." There were no instances of prosecutions under this law during the reporting period. A Ministry of Education directive bans mixing foreign-language or other training with religious teaching or instruction. Monitoring of the ban, particularly in the capital area, is strict. There were no reported violations of the ban in recent years. Religious groups that violate the law may not receive an extension of their registration. If individuals violate the law, the Government may ask their employers to terminate their employment. No such cases were reported during the reporting period. Registration and reregistration are burdensome for all religious groups. The documentary requirements and lengthy process discourage some organizations from applying. Some Christian groups stated that local officials believed there were "too many" churches, or that there should be parity between the registration of new Buddhist temples and the registration of new Christian churches. Nevertheless, no churches were known to have been refused registration in Ulaanbaatar during the reporting period, though the applications of four religious organizations remained under consideration.

Authorities in Tuv aimag (province), near Ulaanbaatar, routinely denied registration to churches. There are currently no churches registered in the aimag, and several churches were again denied registration during the reporting period. A nongovernmental organization (NGO) filed a formal complaint with the National Human Rights Commission in May 2007 concerning the refusal by Tuv aimag authorities to register Christian churches. In June 2007, the Commission wrote to the legislature of Tuv aimag, stating that the actions of the legislature violated the Constitution.

Until the past year, almost all mosques throughout the country were registered as branches of one central Islamic organization. Then, during the reporting period, the Ministry of Justice and Home Affairs clarified that each mosque needed to seek additional approvals from local authorities in its area. This separate registration generally proceeded smoothly. However, one mosque in Darkhan-Uul aimag was told that the aimag legislature had approved its application; but the mosque did not receive documentation, leaving it unable to register with the Ministry of Justice and Home Affairs.

The Muslim community in Ulaanbaatar reported that authorities were helpful in assisting its efforts to construct a mosque, including donating land for the site.

Unregistered religious institutions are often able to function in practice but potentially face difficulties with authorities and are unable to sponsor foreign clergy for visas. Visa problems especially affect Christian churches, many of which depend on foreign clergy.

There were no reports of religious prisoners or detainees or of forced religious conversions.

Religions in Mongolia are unequal in funding for their activities. Buddhism was destroyed almost totally under Communist rule, and it lacks resources for adequate recovery. By contrast, Christian and especially Protestant organizations have significantly more funds coming from abroad for their missionary activities. This results in Christianity spreading faster than the traditional religions of Mongolia, Buddhism and Shamanism.

== See also ==
- Human rights in Mongolia
