= International rankings of Mongolia =

The following are international rankings of Mongolia.

== General ==
- United Nations: Human Development Index 2006, ranked 116 out of 177 countries
- Kearney and Foreign Policy Magazine: Globalization Index 2006, not ranked out of 62 countries

== Economic ==
- The Wall Street Journal and The Heritage Foundation: Index of Economic Freedom 2006, ranked 60 out of 157 countries
- International Monetary Fund: GDP (nominal) per capita 2006, ranked 125 out of 182 countries
- International Monetary Fund: GDP (nominal) 2006, ranked 146 out of 181 countries
- World Economic Forum: Global Competitiveness Index 2006-2007, ranked 92 out of 125 countries

== Political ==
- Transparency International: Corruption Perceptions Index 2006, ranked 99 out of 163 countries
- Reporters Without Borders: Worldwide press freedom index 2006, ranked 86 out of 168 countries

== Environmental ==
- Yale University: Environmental Sustainability Index 2005, ranked 71 out of 146 countries

== Technological ==
- Economist Intelligence Unit: E-readiness 2007, not ranked out of 69 countries
- World Intellectual Property Organization: Global Innovation Index 2026, ranked 72 out of 139 countries

== Social ==
- Economist Intelligence Unit: Quality-of-life index 2005, not ranked

== Cities ==
- Ulaanbaatar: not ranked as a Global city

== International rankings ==
Organization	Survey	Ranking
Institute for Economics and Peace	Global Peace Index	89 out of 144
United Nations Development Programme	Human Development Index	115 out of 182
Transparency International	Corruption Perceptions Index	120 out of 180
World Economic Forum	Global Competitiveness Report	117 out of 133
