= Administrative law in China =

Administrative law in the People's Republic of China was virtually non-existent before the reform and opening up era. Since the 1980s, the People's Republic of China has constructed a new legal framework for administrative law, establishing control mechanisms for overseeing the bureaucracy and disciplinary committees for the Chinese Communist Party. However, many have argued that the usefulness of these laws is vastly inferior in terms of controlling government actions, largely because of institutional and systemic obstacles like a weak judiciary, poorly trained judges and lawyers, and corruption.

== Law reform ==
During the late 1970s and early 1980s, economic reforms called for an expansive role for government, and little attention was paid to administrative law. The 1982 Constitution contained provisions regarding administrative procedures, compensation, and the right to sue. As the Constitution is not directly justiciable, between 1982 and 1988, there were more than 130 implementing laws and regulations which provided for administrative litigation in specific instances. By the end of 1988, the Supreme People's Court had established an administrative law division and more than 1400 local courts had created administrative panels to hear administrative cases.

In 1987, drafting of an Administrative Procedure Law (行政诉讼法) began. The APL was passed in 1989 and went into effect on 1 October 1990. This law made it possible for individuals to bring a case against the administration and also laid down the relevant criteria and procedures for administrative litigation.

The pace of administrative law legislation increased in the 1990s. In 1990, the Administrative Supervision Regulations (行政监察条例) and the Administrative Reconsideration Regulations (行政复议条例) were passed. Both regulations have since been amended and upgraded into laws. The 1993 State Civil Servant Provisional Regulations (国家公务员暂行条例) changed the way government officials were selected and promoted, requiring that they pass exams and yearly appraisals, and introduced a rotation system. In 1994, the State Compensation Law (国家赔偿法) was passed, followed by the Administrative Penalties Law (行政处罚法) in 1996.

== Administrative litigation ==
The Administrative Procedure Law (APL), also known as the Administrative Litigation Law (ALL), allows parties to bring suit when their lawful rights and interests are infringed by a specific administrative act of an administrative organ or its personnel. It has provided an avenue for citizens challenging administrative actions since 1989.

According to the law in China, a plaintiff refers to an individual, a legal person, or other lawful organizations, whose rights have been directly affected by a defendant, viz. a public authority or its employee exercising public powers. This position has, however, experienced reformation and expansion by the Supreme People's Court's interpretation of law and the introduction of public interest litigation. A plaintiff is now guaranteed the right of access to a court, right to counsel, right to motion for conflict out, etc. These rights are to be exercised lawfully and should comply with the rules and instructions laid down by the courts. Since all the parties are equal before law, a defendant or a third person is guaranteed similar rights and also subject to similar obligations. A few differences, however, exist among them as well.

Several Chinese dissidents have invoked administrative law. In 1991, Guo Ruoji, formerly a professor at Nanjing University, sued the Communist Party committee of his university for stripping him of his professorship and banning him from travelling abroad. Both the Nanjing Intermediate Court and the Jiangsu Provincial Supreme People's Court ruled against Guo, on the grounds that acts of the Chinese Communist Party is not an administrative organ. Several other dissidents filed similar lawsuits against the government and the CCP. In 1993, Yuan Hongbing, a professor at Renmin University in Beijing, sued the university's CCP committee for banning a book he had edited, The Tide of History, which attacked leftist orthodox views. In 1998, Li Weiping, a Wuhan-based dissident, used the administrative law to sue the head of the city's Public Security Bureau for the seizure of his passport.

In 2014, The Administrative Litigation Law was amended to lower the burdens on those challenging administrative actions.

As of at least 2024, the trend is that businesses rarely challenge administrative or regulatory agency decisions. Businesses that timely accept regulatory decisions typically receive significantly reduced penalties or sometimes immunity.

== Administrative reconsideration (review) ==
Administrative reconsideration offers a number of advantages over litigation under the Administrative Litigation Law. First, administrative reconsideration is free of charge. Second, administrative reconsideration bodies may consider both the legality and appropriateness of administrative decisions. Third, parties may challenge not only the specific act, but in some cases the abstract act on which it is based.

== Supervisory organs ==
In 1986, the Ministry of Supervision was restored and in 1993, it was merged with the CCP Discipline Committee system. In 1990, the State Council passed the Administrative Supervision Regulations, which were subsequently amended and upgraded to a law in 1997.

The ministry and its subordinate bodies function somewhat like ombudsmen in other jurisdictions. Supervisory organs are charged with overseeing government and administrative officials and their appointed personnel. Whereas courts are generally limited to examining the legality of administrative acts, supervision organs may look into the appropriateness of administrative decisions. Supervisory organs may conduct discovery on administrative departments and officials, issue injunctions to cease acts in violation of law or disciplinary rules, and temporarily remove or seal evidence, among other powers.
