= LGBTQ rights in Mongolia =

- Mongolia
- Legal status: Legal since 1993
- Gender identity: Transgender people permitted to change legal gender marker following a medical procedure to affirm their gender
- Military: Lesbians, gays, bisexuals permitted, transgender people banned
- Discrimination protections: Bans all discrimination based on sexual orientation and gender identity

Family rights
- Recognition of relationships: No
- Restrictions: Same-sex marriage constitutionally banned since 1992
- Adoption: No

Lesbian, gay, bisexual, transgender, and queer (LGBTQ) people in Mongolia face legal and social challenges not experienced by non-LGBTQ people, though there have been substantial improvements since the 1990s. Homosexuality was criminalised in Mongolia in 1961 through its Criminal Code. Following the Mongolian Revolution of 1990 and the peaceful transition to a democracy, homosexuality was legalised and awareness about LGBTQ people has become more prevalent. Since 2017, all discrimination and hate crimes on the basis of sexual orientation and gender identity are outlawed. Households headed by same-sex couples are, however, not eligible for the same legal protections available to opposite-sex couples.

The LGBT Centre (active since 2007) states "advocacy for the human rights of lesbian, gay, bisexual and transgender people in Mongolia" to be its mandate. It is the main engine behind the policy and legislative changes in the country around LGBTQ rights. Historically, the first gay men's human rights organisation was established in March 1999, and was called Tavilan (meaning "destiny" in Mongolian).

== Legality of same-sex sexual acts ==
Genghis Khan banned homosexual acts in the Mongol Empire and made them punishable by death, hoping to expand the Mongolian population which was about 1.5 million at the time, while the rival Song dynasty, which dominated today's central China, had an overwhelmingly outnumbering population of 100 million.

The Khalkha Mongols, like many early Siberian peoples, placed a high regard on heterosexual fertility, love, and intercourse and therefore viewed homosexual affairs as a sort of abomination.

According to Baasanjav Terbish, though forbidden for lamas from a monastic point of view, if seen from the perspective of the civil law, sleeping with a single person (whether same or opposite sex) neither constituted a criminal offense nor posed danger to existing social order in pre-socialist Mongolian society. However, in socialist Mongolia man-to-man penetration was universally forbidden for several ideological-political reasons. Following the Soviet Union, homosexuality was criminalised in Mongolia.

After being criminalized in 1961, all mentions of homosexuality were removed from the Mongolian Criminal Code in 1993, effectively legalising private and consensual same-sex sexual activity. The age of consent is 16, regardless of sexual orientation.

== Recognition of same-sex relationships ==
Article 16 (11) of the Mongolian Constitution defines marriage as being "based on the equality and mutual consent of a man and a woman who have reached the age determined by law. The State protects the interests of the family, motherhood, and the child." Same-sex relationships are not recognized under Mongolian law.

== Discrimination protections and hate crime laws ==
Section 14.1.1 of the Penal Code, in effect since 2017, bans all discrimination based on sexual orientation and gender identity. In addition, Section 10(1)(2)(14) aggravates penalties for homicides motivated by hate towards the victim's sexual orientation and gender identity.

Since 2022, Article 6 of the Labor Code bans discrimination based on sexual orientation, gender identity, and gender expression.

Until recently, violence and discrimination against LGBTQ people in Mongolia were fairly common and often not reported to the police. In 2001, a lesbian woman was raped, abducted and stabbed by two men. In 2009, an ultra-nationalist neo-Nazi group kidnapped three transgender women and sexually assaulted them. None of these crimes was reported to the police for fear of victimization and reprisal. In February 2014, a gay man was sexually assaulted by a neo-Nazi group. Following public outcry from the LGBTQ community and civil society organizations, the Government of Mongolia announced in May 2014 that it would consider anti-discrimination legislation to protect LGBTQ people.

On 3 December 2015, the Mongolian Parliament adopted a new Criminal Code covering hate crimes, with the protected grounds including sexual orientation, gender identity and health status, making Mongolia one of the first Asian countries to have this level of protections for LGBTQ people. The Criminal Code was planned to come into force on 1 September 2016; however, the newly elected Cabinet postponed the date to 1 July 2017. As of August 2018, the LGBT Centre was training more than 300 police officers, prosecutors and judges on what hate crimes are and how to properly handle them. Despite this, local reports and LGBTQ activists say that the police continue to disregard complaints of hate crimes against LGBTQ people or do not take them seriously, and that these attacks often result in no punishment.

== Gender identity and expression ==
An amendment made in June 2009 to Article 20(1) of the Civil Registration Law (Mongolian: Улсын бүртгэлийн ерөнхий хууль) allows transgender people to change their legal gender on birth certificates or citizen identification cards following sex reassignment surgery.

In addition, hate speech on the basis of gender identity is outlawed in the country. Crimes committed on the basis of the victim's gender identity, known as hate crimes, will result in additional legal penalties.

== Sex education ==
Mongolia's sex education curriculum introduced in 1998 includes discussion on LGBTQ and sexual health issues, though teachers may choose whether to cover these topics. Several LGBTQ students have reported discrimination and bullying at schools.

== Living conditions ==
Mongolian culture is and has remained strongly heteronormative. Despite laws introduced in 2017 to protect LGBTQ+ rights, ostracism, harassment, and violence persist, both socially and systemically. A 2019 report from the LGBT Centre revealed that 79% of LGBTQ-identified young people in Mongolia have experienced some form of bullying, discrimination, and/or ostracism.

In December 2018, the LGBTQ Centre held a social experiment in Ulaanbaatar, placing three LGBTQ persons (one gay man, one lesbian and one transgender man) on the side of the road and watching bystanders' reactions. Online reactions were mixed, ranging from death threats to negative comments to positive ones, and showed that the public were more welcoming of the lesbian and the trans man than of the gay man.

=== Legal recognition ===
In 2009, after more than 10 failed attempts, the Mongolian Government registered the LGBT Centre (Mongolian: ЛГБТ төв), the sole non-governmental LGBTQ human rights organisation. Initially, the State Registration Agency refused to register the organization because it "conflicts with Mongolian customs and traditions and has the potential to set a wrong example for youth and adolescents." A 2013 report by the LGBT Centre revealed that over 73% of LGBTQ Mongolians had considered suicide due to social nonacceptance and intolerance.

The International Day Against Homophobia, Transphobia and Biphobia has been celebrated in Mongolia since 2011, with events organised by the LGBT Centre. In 2013, the first Pride week was organised by members of the LGBTQ community. Since 2014, the LGBT Centre has been organising "Equality and Pride Days" annually to promote non-discrimination and equality. The 2018 pride march attracted more than 200 people.

=== LGBTQ culture ===
There are several gay bars in Ulaanbaatar, one being called D.D./H.Z. Multiple LGBTQ groups have emerged over the years. The first gay group, Tavilan (Mongolian: тавилан), was founded in 1999 and successfully registered as an NGO, then had its license revoked in 2000 and continued to operate informally. The first lesbian rights organisation, MILC, was established in December 2003 following the failure on the part of the founders of Tavilan to redraft its bylaws to include other sub-communities within the LGBTQ community. The organisation Zaluus Eruul Mend was established in 2003 to continue the HIV work of Tavilan.

=== Religious views ===
There are no religious barriers to homosexuality, as the dominant religion, Tibetan Buddhism, is silent on homosexuality. Some Mongolians believe homosexuality to be a product and subsequent import of the West.

=== United Nations ===
Mongolia has supported landmark LGBTQ reforms at the United Nations. In 2011, it signed the "joint statement on ending acts of violence and related human rights violations based on sexual orientation and gender identity" at the United Nations, condemning violence and discrimination against LGBTQ people. In 2016, it supported the appointment of an independent expert to identify what causes violence and discrimination against LGBTQ people and to find ways to protect them.

== LGBTQ Mongolians ==
Solongo Batsukh is an openly transgender model, make-up artist and beauty queen. In 2018, she participated in Miss Universe Mongolia.

== Summary table ==
Same-sex sexual activity legal	Yes (Since 1993)
Equal age of consent (16)	Yes (Since 1993)
Anti-discrimination laws in employment only	Yes (Since 2017)
Anti-discrimination laws in the provision of goods and services	Yes (Since 2017)
Anti-discrimination laws in all other areas (incl. indirect discrimination, hate speech)	Yes (Since 2017)
Hate crime laws include sexual orientation and gender identity	Yes (Since 2017)
Same-sex marriages	No (Constitutional ban since 1992)
Recognition of same-sex couples	No
Stepchild adoption by same-sex couples	No
Joint adoption by same-sex couples	No
Adoption by single people regardless of sexual orientation	Yes
Lesbian, gay, and bisexual people allowed to serve openly in the military	Yes
Transgender people allowed to serve openly in the military	No
Right to change legal gender	Yes (Since 2009; sex reassignment surgery required)
Access to IVF for lesbians	Yes
Commercial surrogacy for gay male couples	No
MSMs allowed to donate blood	No

== See also ==
- Human rights in Mongolia
- LGBTQ rights in Asia
