= LGBT Centre Mongolia =

Organization in Ulaanbaatar, Mongolia

The LGBT Centre
- ЛГБТ төв
- Logo
- Formation: 2007
- Founded at: Ulaanbaatar
- Website: lgbtcentre.mn

The LGBT Centre Mongolia (Mongolian: ЛГБТ төв, romanized: LGBT töv) was founded in 2007 and is based in Ulaanbaatar. After a legal struggle, it was officially recognised in 2009. It then submitted reports to the United Nations which encouraged the Mongolian government to change its criminal code. The centre supports LGBT rights in Mongolia and has organised an annual Pride march since 2013. It was awarded the Felipa de Souza Award in 2011.

== Foundation ==
The LGBT (Lesbian Gay Bisexual Transgender) Centre was set up in 2007. Directors include Anaraa Nyamdorj and Otgonbaatar Tsedendemberel. In the mid-2000s, the LGBT Centre was unsuccessful for two years in its attempts to register itself legally as a group with the Ministry of Justice and Home Affairs. The International Gay and Lesbian Human Rights Commission (now OutRight Action International) and Human Rights Watch campaigned on behalf of the centre. By 2009, it was applying to the Civil Registration Authority and after more than ten refusals because the name did not fit with "Mongolian traditions and customs", the Centre was finally able to register, helped by the National Human Rights Commission.

== Projects ==
After registering as a project, the Centre submitted reports to various United Nations mechanisms, namely the Universal Periodic Review, the Committee Against Torture and the Committee on Economic, Social and Cultural Rights. This resulted in the Mongolian government undertaking to conform with international standards on LGBT people's rights. The reports had documented assaults (physical and verbal), rape and domestic violence against young LGBT people. Subsequently in 2017, Mongolia was one of the first countries in Asia to protect gender and sexual identity in its criminal code. As well as campaigning legally, the centre engages with young people and provides health advice.

After a police officer assaulted a transgender woman in 2007, the LGBT Centre began training the National Police Agency about hate crimes and by 2019 it had assisted over 500 individuals. Alongside other groups such as the National Human Rights Commission, the LGBT Centre organised the first Pride march in Mongolia in September 2013. In 2019, the march had 250 participants. The organisation has worked with the Fulbright Program, hosting researchers. It also has links with LGBT researchers in Australia.

To mark Human Rights Day 2018, the LGBT Centre performed a social experiment at a busy pedestrian junction in central Ulaanbaatar. Three people stood blindfolded for thirty minutes, holding a sign which asked to be hugged and also declaring their sexuality or gender identity. One person was lesbian, one gay and one transgender man. The process was recorded and over the total ninety minutes, there were 30 hugs. Most passers by assumed the trans man was a woman and the gay man received the most negative reactions.

== Awards ==
The LGBT Centre was presented with the Felipa de Souza Award by OutRight Action International in 2011. Representatives went to New York to collect the award and were able to connect with funding organisations such as the Open Society Foundations.

== See also ==
- LGBT community centre
- LGBT rights in Mongolia
