= Judicial General Council of Mongolia =

Oversight body for judicial independence in Mongolia

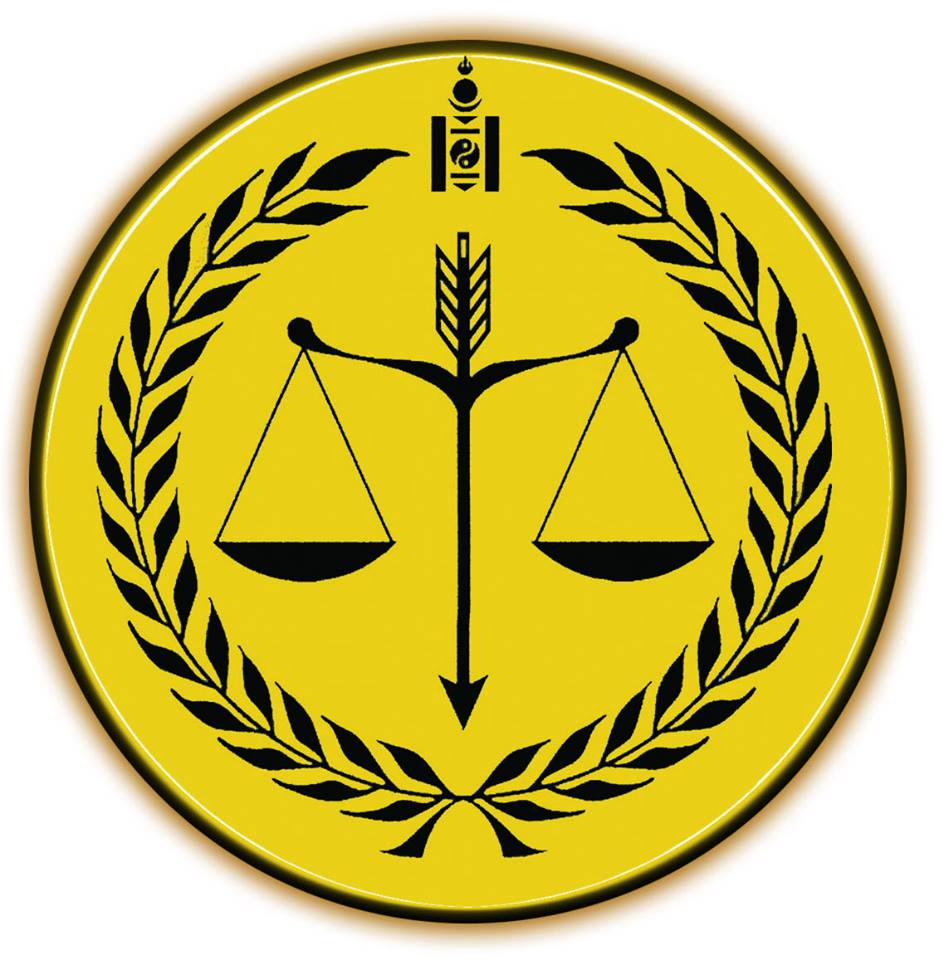
Emblem of the Judicial General Council of Mongolia

The Judicial General Council of Mongolia (Mongolian: Монгол Улсын Шүүхийн Ерөнхий Зөвлөл, Mongol Ulsyn Shüükhiin Yerönkhii Zövlöl) is an organ of the Mongolian judiciary mandated by the Constitution of Mongolia to maintain the independence of the judiciary, represent the Mongolian judiciary and advise on the selection and removal of judicial officers.

== Background ==
The Council consists of 5 members being appointed by the President of Mongolia.

In fulfilling its constitutional mandate, the Council submits recommendations to the State Great Khural and the President on the establishment and structure of the court system, their personnel, appointments and release of judicial officers. Further, it selects and examines judicial officers, upgrades their skills and qualifications through training, and distributes budgets and controls over expenditure of funds.

The council has been at the centre of ongoing judicial reform efforts in Mongolia. It has received assistance from the United States Agency for International Development to improve budgeting, enhance the capacity of court administrators and develop a national case information database. The council has also assisted aid organizations in attempts to curb corruption within the Mongolian judiciary.

== Structure ==
The council is currently organized in the following manner.

=== Working division ===
- Executive Secretariat
- Judicial Management Office
- Judges' Resource Office
- Judicial Finance and Investment Office
- Judicial External Relations Department
- Judicial Media and Public Relations Department
- Judicial Internal Auditing Division
- Judicial Research and Information center.

=== Ethics committee ===
- Head of the Ethics Committee
- Members of the Ethics Committee
- Ethics Committee Office

=== Qualifications committee ===
- Head of the Qualification Committee
- Members of the Qualification Committee
- Qualification Committee Office

=== Mediation committee ===
- Head of the Mediation Committee
- Members of the Qualification Committee
