= Human rights in Mongolia =

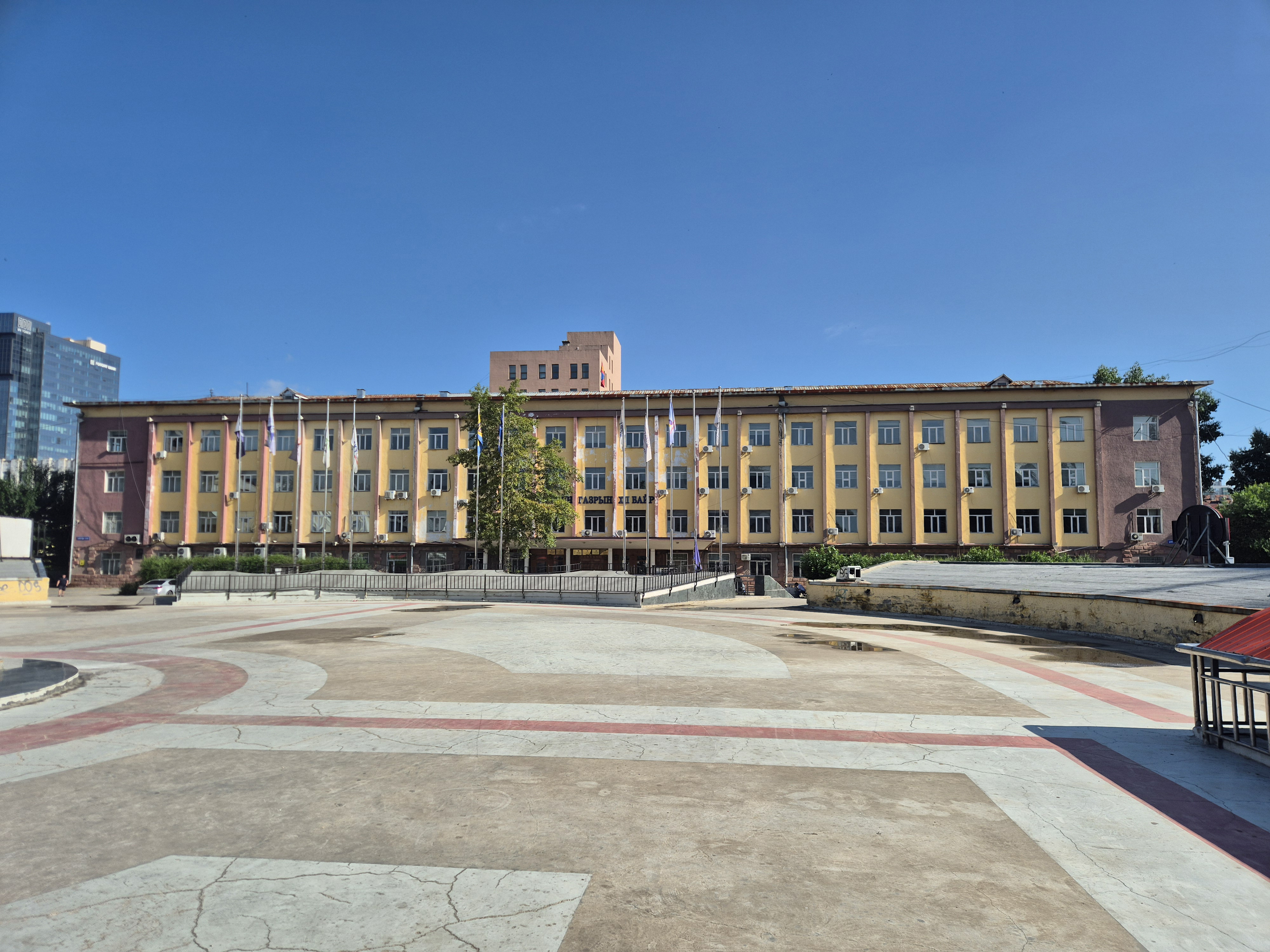
Government Building 12 which houses the National Human Rights Commission of Mongolia

Since its turn towards democracy in 1990, Mongolia has in principle acknowledged the concept of human and civic rights. "Human rights law," according to one human-rights organization, "is a rapidly expanding area in the Mongolian legal system." In September 2000, Mongolia unilaterally adopted the so-called "Millennium Goal 9", which is "to strengthen human rights and foster democratic governance." Writing in 2012 in the Jakarta Post, the secretary-general of the Indonesian Community who "led the first demonstrations for democracy and reforms in Mongolia," stated that "the passion for freedom and human rights" is "palpable in his being." Addressing an audience at the Asia Society in New York in 2011, Elbegdorj Tsakhia said: "Freedom, human rights, justice, the rule of law, those values can be enjoyed, even by the poor people, even by poor herdsman in Mongolia." The desire for human rights, he said, "is always there," in all people. "Sometimes that desire can be crushed by tyranny. But it will rise again. That is Mongolia."

Yet despite Mongolia's economic and social progress since the end of Communism, the "heritage from the old totalitarian regime," according to one observer, "is a negative influence on the realization of human rights in Mongolia." Official abuse of power is widespread, and law-enforcement officers "do not adequately respect the security and liberty of the people." While the media report frequently on human-rights violations, "most people, except lawyers and professors, have no systematic knowledge on human rights to be able to properly appreciate the news on human rights....People begin to see the real meaning of human rights only after suffering injustice."

A report by the UN Special Rapporteur on Extreme Poverty and Human Rights Mongolia indicated in December 2012 that while Mongolia "is currently experiencing a major resource boom and the country is on the brink of one of the most dramatic transformations in its history," with the mining of mineral wealth and foreign investment "expected to triple the national economy by 2020," the country "ranks disappointingly among the worse countries in the international human development index (110 out of 187 according to the 2011 Human Development Index)."

Among the serious human-rights problems that face Mongolia, especially within the police and security sector, are the abuse of prisoners by police, uneven law enforcement, poor prison conditions, arbitrary arrest, excessively long periods of pretrial detention, judicial corruption, lack of media independence, government secrecy, domestic violence, and trafficking in persons. Discrimination "on the basis of ethnic origin, language, race, age, sex, social origin, or status" is forbidden, and there is official sexual equality "in political, economic, social, cultural fields, and family." Increasing attention has been paid recently to the human-rights impact of the rapid expansion of the mining industry in Mongolia, which in many cases has had a deleterious impact upon the environment of traditional herders and therefore upon their everyday lives and occupational prospects.

== Basic rights ==
In Mongolia, basic human rights are constitutionally guaranteed, with the country being a signatory to various international treaties. The 1992 Constitution ensures freedom of speech, assembly, and religion, as well as the right to a fair trial and the protection from discrimination. However, challenges remain in practice, particularly regarding the treatment of minorities and issues related to press freedom. Mongolia has made strides in strengthening its human rights framework through cooperation with international bodies, including the European Union. In recent developments, the 23rd meeting of the Mongolia–EU Joint Committee, held on 4 April 2025, emphasized the importance of human rights dialogue, which includes monitoring and improving these rights as part of broader developmental goals.

While there is freedom of speech and of the press, "insulting" is a crime, and the government attempts to pressure and silence the news media in various ways. Although censorship is illegal, many journalists engage in self-censorship out of fear of reprisal by the government or by their employers. Although Mongolian law guarantees a right to privacy, the government often intrudes into the privacy of its opponents, journalists, and others, by tapping phones and breaking into e-mail accounts.

In 2009, most of the television stations in Ulaanbaatar signed an "agreement" with the Media Office of the General Policy Authority in which they effectively submitted to a degree of government oversight over their content in return for "protection". Newspapers have been fined for defamation of the government, and libel charges against and tax investigations of the news media are common. In libel cases, the burden of proof is on the defendant. Many journalists are corrupt, moreover, and will invent news stories in exchange for a payment.

Although the government does not restrict Internet access, it does monitor certain persons' e-mails. Academic freedom and cultural freedom are respected, as are the freedom of assembly and association. Mongolians are free to move within the country, travel abroad, move abroad and move back from abroad. Foreigners living in Mongolia must obtain exit visas in order to leave the country. Elections are relatively free and fair. There are 17 registered political parties, which are able to conduct their activities freely.

== Abolition of capital punishment ==
On 14 January 2010, the country's President Tsakhiagiin Elbegdorj announced that he would, henceforth, systematically use his prerogative to pardon all people sentenced to death. He stated that most countries in the world had abolished the death penalty, and Mongolia should follow their example. He suggested that the capital punishment would be commuted to a thirty-year prison sentence. The decision was controversial; when President Elbegdorj announced it in Parliament, MPP representatives chose not to give the applause customarily due after a presidential speech. (See: Capital punishment in Mongolia)

President Elbegdorj stated "Capital punishment is wrong–it degrades human dignity. It brings no peace to society. It does not deter crime and does not lift up mankind," in his speech at the High-Level Meeting on the Rule of Law of the 67th session of the United Nations General Assembly on 24 September 2012. "By ratifying the Second Optional Protocol Mongolia would add yet one more country in the world community to fully abolish the death penalty. Pardoning a life does not mean pardoning a penalty. The punishment for serious and cruel felonies must be severe, and must be just. However, I do not think it is just to deprive any citizens of life in the name of state. The right to life is one of the fundamental rights of a human being and cannot depend on anyone, not even on the head of state. The state should respect very fundamental human rights, and secure them by law," President Elbegdorj pointed out in his greeting to the delegation of the 5th international meeting of Justice Ministers on 18 May 2010.

Four months after President Elbegdorj's announcement of moratorium of death penalty by his pardon, a survey was conducted among Mongolian legal academics asking whether it is right or wrong to abolish death penalty in Mongolia. 83% of the survey participants responded that it was wrong. They criticized "By pardoning death row inmates, the Mongolian President directly interferes in criminal procedures. Nobody has the right to change court rulings." According to Article 33.1.8 of the Constitution, the Mongolian president has the prerogative "to grant pardon." Some academics and critics considered that it is too early and wrong to abolish death penalty in Mongolia, explaining that murder crimes are becoming too brutal and severe since the death penalty would not be implemented.

Despite much criticism from domestic conservative politicians, the opposition, and critics, President Elbegdorj's decision was positively received internationally. Amnesty International noted "President Elbegdorj's actions demonstrate commitment to the protection of human rights and set a good example for other Asian countries in the region," on 18 February 2010. International organization "Hands off Cain" awarded Elbegdorj with "Abolitionist of the Year 2011" noting Mongolia as an example that fosters the right to life among Asian countries.

Finally, in January 2012, Mongolian Parliament amended a law to join the 2nd Optional Protocol to the Convention on Civil and Political Rights; making Mongolia a state party to the convention and reinforcing the country's commitment to the abolition of capital punishment.

== Institutionalized corruption ==
Corruption is a major problem throughout the Mongolian government and law enforcement, and there is insufficient oversight by either official agencies or the independent media. Also, the immunity of parliament members from prosecution encourages corruption and shields offenders from punishment.

Public debate on issues is inhibited by the fact that much government decision-making takes place behind closed doors. There is no provision for the disclosure of government information to the public, and the State Secrets Law is strong and comprehensive.

In Transparency International's 2024 Corruption Perceptions Index, which scored 180 countries on a scale from 0 ("highly corrupt") to 100 ("very clean"), Mongolia scored 33. When ranked by score, Mongolia ranked 114th among the 180 countries in the Index, where the country ranked first is perceived to have the most honest public sector. For comparison with regional scores, the best score among the countries of the Asia Pacific region (Note: Afghanistan, Australia, Bangladesh, Bhutan, Cambodia, China, Fiji, Hong Kong, India, Indonesia, Japan, Laos, Malaysia, Maldives, Mongolia, Myanmar, Nepal, New Zealand, North Korea, Pakistan, Papua New Guinea, Philippines, Singapore, Solomon Islands, South Korea, Sri Lanka, Taiwan, Thailand, Timor-Leste, Vanuatu, and Vietnam) was 84, the average score was 44 and the worst score was 16. For comparison with worldwide scores, the best score was 90 (ranked 1), the average score was 43, and the worst score was 8 (ranked 180).

"I sincerely believe that the true enemy of democracy and freedom is corruption ... The worst theft is corruption which damages people's common rights and liberties ... I am convinced that fighting corruption must be one of the most important duties of the Mongolian State today," President Elbegdorj noted in 2012. In September 2009 Elbegdorj replaced the Community Council of Independent Authority Against Corruption (IAAC) formed by former President Nambaryn Enkhbayar which included sports and music stars and supreme clergy while expressing his dissatisfaction with its investigation of petty corruption instead of political level corruption. He then reorganized the council with professional lawyers.

Government corruption and the abuse of power by police have a deleterious effect on the right to engage freely in public debate. There have been several instances of police violence or arbitrary conduct in recent years involving opposition politicians, journalists, or protesters, among them:

- The abduction of D. Enkhbat from France in 2003. Allegedly, he was suspected to be involved in S. Zorig's assassination. Mongolia's Central Intelligence Agency abducted him from Le Havre in 2003, brought him to Berlin, where he was drugged and brought onto the regular MIAT plane to Ulaanbaatar. He was, however, not tried for being involved in the Zorig case. Instead, the authorities said they imprisoned Enkhbat because a health certificate that had led to a release from a previous sentence had been a forgery. Additionally, he and his lawyer L. Sanjaasüren were convicted of exposing state secrets in 2004. Enkhbat died on 22 April 2006. Ts. Nyamdorj (MPRP) was the Justice Minister in 2000–2008, 2008–2012. For his suspected role in D. Enkhbat's kidnapping, B.Khurts, who was a spy at the Central Intelligence Agency was arrested in the UK in late 2010. B.Khurts and three others of the Central Intelligence Agency were ordered and sent by then Prime Minister Nambaryn Enkhbayar (MPRP) to abduct D.Enkhbat from France. The Central Intelligence Agency is directly under the control of the Prime Minister. In 2010 B.Khurts was working as a high-ranking member of the National Security Council of Mongolia and on official visit to the UK then extradited to Germany in August 2011. Released the next month, Khurts returned to Mongolia and became Deputy Chief of the Independent Authority Against Corruption in Mongolia. Enkhbayar was convicted of and sentenced to two and a half-year prison term by all three-level courts for graft, embezzlement, misappropriation of government properties, and misuse of his position in 2012. However, Enkhbayar was never tried for his ordering and sending a mission to abduct D.Enkhbat from France.
- The detention of Member of Parliament Lamjaviin Gundalai (Democratic Party). In August 2003, the opposition MP L. Gundalai was detained from a flight to South Korea after a week-long conflict with then Justice Minister Ts. Nyamdorj (MPRP). Witnesses said that the police showed no arrest warrants or identity cards. A videotape of the incident allegedly showed Gundalai's bodyguard, who was also arrested, being choked, and Gundalai's assistant was beaten. Gundalai was released on the next day.
- In May 2006, Eagle TV reporters Batdorj, Bayanbat, and News Director Orgil were confronted by police when they tried to film the teardown for the morning news under MPRP Prime Ministership and Justice Minister Ts. Nyamdorj (MPRP). According to the TV station's Managing Director Tom Terry, the police officer repeatedly smashed his fist into the camera, causing damage significant enough that it no longer works properly and will have to be sent for repair.
- The deaths of five people were shot dead by the police during the state of emergency called by President Nambaryn Enkhbayar (MPRP) and the MPRP government led by Sanjaagiin Bayar (MPRP) and Justice Minister Tsendiin Munkh-Orgil (MPRP) following July 1st, 2008 riots, whose exact circumstances remain unclear. Additionally, there were allegations of police brutality against people arrested in connection to the riots.
- In 2023-2024, Prime Minister of Mongolia Luvsannamsrain Oyun-Erdene initiated a comprehensive dual reform agenda. This agenda aims to transform the judicial system and ensure fair distribution of the country's abundant mineral resources. The reform push comes after Mongolia's corruption perception suffered a significant decline, as reported by Transparency International. Furthermore, there was extensive public outrage over the mishandling of coal exports to China, resulting in large-scale street protests towards the end of 2022. Consequently, management changes and corruption convictions were made at the state-owned Erdenes Tavan Tolgoi coal mining company.

== Women's rights ==
Authorities do not interfere in the rights of families to make their own decisions about childbirth and upbringing. Most women have access to obstetric care, but there are widespread problems in regard to waiting times, confidentiality, and lack of professionalism by health-care workers.

Many women are their families' main breadwinners. Mongolian law specifies that men and women should receive equal pay for doing the same work and enjoy the same access to education, although women are banned from certain jobs that involve physical labor or that are especially dangerous and women are allowed to retire at 55, five years earlier than men.

In principle, women have equal rights in divorce and are entitled to alimony, but husbands are often permitted to retain full control of family businesses after divorces. Divorce is not available to women who are pregnant or have a child under the age of one. (Article 12.2 of the Family Code 1999) There is no official agency tasked exclusively with safeguarding women's rights, but there is a National Gender Center that is subordinate to the Prime Minister's Office as well as various other councils and committees that are concerned with women's issues. There are also active and outspoken women's rights organizations.

The UN Committee on the Elimination of Discrimination against Women expressed concern in a 2008 report that "women bear a disproportionate burden of family responsibility in the context of the State policy on population growth which encourages larger families." The committee urged Mongolia "to intensify its efforts to eradicate traditional stereotypes regarding the roles and responsibilities of women and men in the family and society" and to promote "the equal sharing of domestic and family responsibilities, including the idea of joint parental responsibility between women and men."

The committee also urged the "implementation of the Law on Fighting against Domestic Violence" and called on Mongolia "to ensure that all women who are victims of domestic violence, including rural women, have access to immediate means of redress and protection, including protection orders, access to safe shelters and medical and rehabilitation assistance in all parts of the country" and "to ensure that public officials, especially law enforcement personnel, the judiciary, health-care providers and social workers, are fully familiar with applicable legal provisions, and are sensitized to all forms of violence against women and adequately respond to them." It also urged Mongolia to criminalize marital rape and to take action against the trafficking of women.

== Children's rights ==
There is widespread violence against children and sexual abuse of them, particularly within families of the poor class, and it is often the case that authorities do not take these offenses seriously. Child prostitution is also common, and in some cases police officers are in cahoots with pimps and brothels. Some child prostitutes, instead of being helped by authorities, have been punished for prostitution. There are many orphans, and the abandonment of children is a major issue, with the law providing no deterrent to prevent this crime. Hundreds of children live on the street, and child shelters are substandard. Children residing at shelters are not sent to schools, and children without proper ID are refused treatment at hospitals. There exists a relatively new, privately funded program to provide schooling and play experiences for children in shelters but none that's funded or initiated by the government.

Mongolia is not a signatory of the 1980 Hague Convention on the Civil Aspects of International Child Abduction. It is, however, a signatory of the Convention on the Rights of the Child and since 2003 has passed several laws in an effort to conform to the convention, among them the Law on Prevention from Iodine Deficiency by Salt Iodization, the Law on Prevention of HIV/AIDS, the Law on Breast Milk Substitutes, and Law on Monetary Assistance to the Child and Family, and has also amended the Law on Social Welfare, the Law on Education, and the Criminal Procedure Law to conform to the convention.

The issue of child labor is also important in Mongolia. In fact, 13.8% of children aged 5 to 14 are working children according to a 2013 U.S. Department of Labor's report. Almost 86% of these children are engaged in agricultural activities while others are exposed to the hazards of the mining industry, digging for gold, coal and fluorspar. In December 2014, the Department's List of Goods Produced by Child Labor or Forced Labor indicated the ongoing use of child labor in these sectors.

== LGBT rights ==
Homosexuality is not explicitly outlawed, but there is a law against "immoral gratification of sexual desires." The LGBT Center has charged the government with monitoring members' e-mail accounts. In 2009, Human Rights Watch called on Mongolia's minister of justice to "overturn a state agency's decision to deny the official registration request of the Lesbian, Gay, Bisexual and Transgender Center, a national nongovernmental organization," noting that the "center cannot operate in the country without this registration." The agency's reason for rejecting the request was that the center's name "has a meaning that conflicts with Mongolian customs and traditions and has the potential to set the wrong example for youth and adolescents."

== Employees' rights ==
Employees have the right to unionize and strike, although this right is limited in the case of foreigners, government employees, workers without job contracts, and workers providing essential services. Pressure and harassment have been used to prevent the formation of unions or to inhibit union demonstrations, and a union leader was fired for leading a strike in 2010. Collective bargaining is permitted. Forced labor is illegal, but occurs. Several hundred North Koreans who work in factories, mines, and other jobs through an arrangement with their government are not free to quit or complain about their jobs.

The law prohibits work by children under 14 and limits work by older children, but enforcement is highly ineffective, and many children are forced to work in construction and in mines. Because of abandonment by parents, many children are obliged to support themselves by working as animal herders or in other jobs. Child jockeys are also used in horse races.

There is a minimum wage, but it is low and many workers are paid less. There are also laws setting a maximum workweek and other limits. There are no laws governing sick leave. Enforcement of occupational health and safety laws is insufficient, and the conditions under which many foreigners work, chiefly North Korean and Chinese laborerers working in such fields as mining and construction, are below standard.

Human Rights Watch, citing a report that the Mongolian and North Korean governments had agreed to an arrangement by which up to 5300 North Koreans would work in Mongolia, called on Mongolia in 2008 to "protect the human and labor rights of North Koreans coming to Mongolia to work," noting that North Koreans working abroad under such arrangements "face severe restrictions on their freedom of expression, movement, and association" and often remain "under virtually constant surveillance by North Korean 'minders,'" HRW asked Mongolian officials "to conduct thorough on-site investigations in facilities where North Koreans work, ensure that all North Korean workers are fully informed of their rights and how to exercise them, ensure that workers receive net wages compliant with minimum wage laws, and monitor freedom of movement of North Korean workers." An HRW official said: "This is a chance for the Mongolian government to set a positive precedent for North Koreans working overseas and allow them to be treated like other workers, instead of as virtual prisoners of North Korean minders. They must not waste it."

== Impact of mining on human rights ==
A report by the United Nations Human Rights Team Group in 2006 noted that while "Mongolia's mining sector has become an important part of Mongolia's economic development in the past ten years, this economic development has not been conducted in a manner consistent ... with [Millennium] Goal 9 to 'strengthen human rights' in Mongolia." Among its findings were that the destruction of pasture land and water resources as a result of mining has damaged conditions for herders and that they have not been provided with alternative opportunities for employment and the need to moves their herds further from former herding areas, and for longer periods, has caused them to lose access to education, health care, and social services.

The National Human Rights Commission of Mongolia held a three-day conference in Ulaanbaatar in October 2012 to study "the human rights impacts of the country’s booming mining sector." Government and industry representatives, plus members of international human-rights groups, discussed the fact that "many herders in mining areas have been forced to leave their traditional lands and find alternative means to support themselves" and "the impact of these changes on the human rights of herders, in particular, their right to live in a healthy and safe environment, property rights and the right to preserve one's culture and traditions." Also discussed was "conflict between mining companies and artisanal miners, civil society organisations and local people has been escalating in recent times, occasionally resulting in violence." Testimony by persons living in mining districts confirmed that the rapid development of mining has indeed had drastic impacts upon the environment and thus upon local residents' long-term health and survival prospects as well as their economic viability in non-mining occupations.

A member of the UN Working Group on Human Rights and Business, during a visit to mining areas in Mongolia in 2012, observed "an unfortunate lack of clarity about the respective roles and responsibilities of the government and business with regard to human rights. In many mining communities, I heard residents' expectations that hospitals and schools would be built in their soums by companies, without any mention of the government's responsibility to do so. In other conversations, I heard of severe workplace accidents caused by companies unwilling to take safety precautions. These companies were not sanctioned for their actions, and remedies were not available for victims or their families."

In the summer of 2012, the Asian Forum for Human Rights and Development and its Mongolian member organization, the Centre for Human Rights and Development, investigated "the situation of human rights defenders ... working on human rights violations in relation to mining activities in Mongolia." The investigators found that herders living near mines "face numerous human rights violations, including the rights to live in a safe and secure environment; to access clean water; to choose and protect the source of their livelihood and income; to own property; to participate in decision-making concerning the mineral exploitation on their lands; to access justice and effective remedies; and to preserve their cultural heritage." The investigators found that human rights defenders were subjected to threats, intimidation, judicial harassment, vilification, and smear campaigns; in their report the investigators noted that even they, though accompanied by local officials, "were harassed by a security guard" at mining site.

== Rights of persons seeking asylum or refugee status ==
Mongolia is not a signatory of the 1951 Convention relating to the Status of Refugees or the 1967 Protocol relating to the Status of Refugees, but its constitution recognizes a right to asylum and the government gives refuge to persons persecuted in their home countries on account of race, religion, and various other attributes. However, refugees are treated officially as illegal migrants and do not have a right to receive medical care, to get an education, or to work. nor are they allowed to work. Such persons can apply for Mongolian citizenship, but the process often takes much longer than the maximum of six months that it is supposed to take according to the law.

== Rights of persons under arrest ==
Although forbidden by law, arbitrary arrest occurs. Many Mongolians are unaware of their rights under the law when it comes to such matters. Abuse by police generally goes uninvestigated owing to inadequate resources or to the quashing of such efforts by police. Moreover, while a court-issued warrant is a prerequisite for arrest under Mongolian law, most arrests are made without a warrant. Laws requiring court orders to hold subjects for more than three days and requiring authorities to inform suspects of the charges against them are generally followed.

There is a bail system. Defendants who cannot afford a lawyer are entitled to court-appointed representation, though many defendants are unaware of this right and are not told about it, while others do not avail themselves of this opportunity because they do not trust court-appointed lawyers to represent them fairly. Police frequently employ excessive violence while making arrests. A UNESCO report issued in 2005 noted that while Mongolia had sought in recent years to bring its legislation into line with international human rights standards, it is still common for criminal suspects to undergo "torture and ill-treatment" and "perpetrators enjoy impunity".

== Rights of persons on trial ==
Although Mongolian law prescribes an independent court system and the right to a fair trial by a judge, judicial corruption, including a susceptibility to bribery and inappropriate influence, is a growing problem, particularly at the Supreme Court level. There are no jury trials; defendants technically have a right to interrogate witnesses, offer evidence, and file appeals, although many persons are convicted as a result of forced confessions. According to Amnesty International, lawyers and government officials describe Mongolian courts as corrupt and say that trials are often unfair, routinely using as evidence confession obtained through torture. Detention facilities do not make adequate provisions for confidential meetings between defendants and their attorneys.

== Rights of prisoners ==
Conditions in prison and detention facilities are poor, although in recent years there have been efforts at improvement. Adults and children are often detained together. Abuse is common, as are overcrowding, poor ventilation, low hygienic standards, and inadequate medical care. Prisoners doing time don't get medical treatment, even under serious sickness or injuries. There are no law for this kind of human rights. Prisoners enjoy the right to worship, receive visitors, submit complaints. Critics like the UN's Special Rapporteur on torture, Manfred Novak, have repeatedly criticized Mongolia's prisons, and especially the conditions surrounding the death penalty, as cruel and inhuman. Fifty-nine different crimes, including acts of terrorism, genocide, rape, sabotage, and murder were punishable by the death penalty until 2012, though no executions took place after 2010, when the president imposed a moratorium. Another subject of criticism was the fact that the use of the death penalty was covered by the Law on State Secrets and the Law on the List of State Secrets, which means that statistics on executions were kept secret.

== History of the minimum wage in Mongolia ==
Year	Monthly minimum wage	Remarks
Jan 2023	₮550,000	Approximately 30% Increase
Jan 2024	₮660,000	20%
April 2025	₮792,000	20%

== See also ==
- Freedom of religion in Mongolia
- Telecommunications in Mongolia
