= Supreme Court of Mongolia =

Highest court in the judicial system of Mongolia

Supreme Court of Mongolia Монгол Улсын Дээд Шүүх
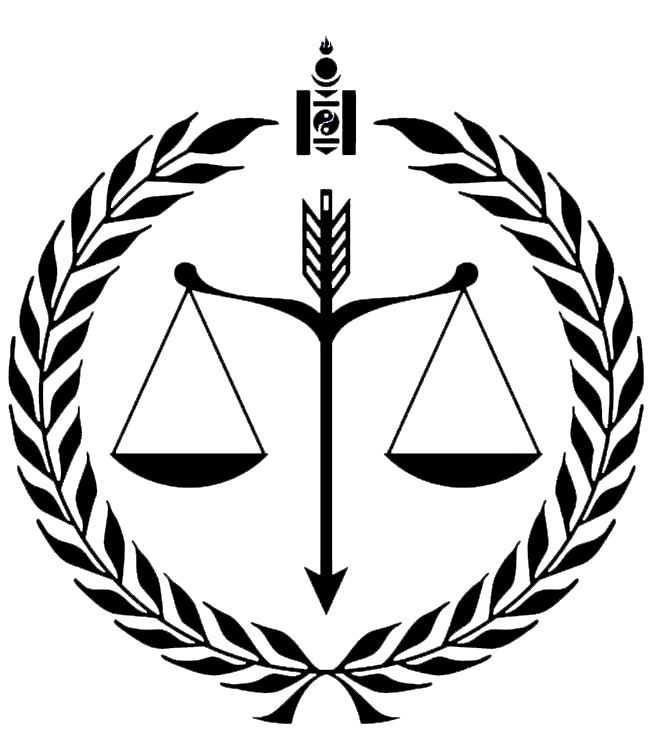
- Established: 1927
- Jurisdiction: Mongolia
- Location: Ulaanbaatar
- Composition method: Appointment by President of Mongolia after presentation by the General Council of the Courts
- Authorised by: Constitution of Mongolia
- Website: www.supremecourt.mn

Chief Justice of the Supreme Court
- Currently: Tsogt Tsend
- Since: 15 June 2026

The Supreme Court of Mongolia (Mongolian: Монгол Улсын Дээд Шүүх) is the highest court in the judicial system of Mongolia, and is generally the court of last resort for non-constitutional matters. It is established by Article 48(1) of the Constitution of Mongolia. The 1992 Constitution states in Article 50(1) that "the Supreme Court shall be the highest judicial organ".

The Supreme Court has jurisdiction over serious criminal matters, receives appeals from lower-instance courts. It also hears appeals from the Constitutional Court with respect to the protection of the rule of law and human rights and from the Prosecutor General. The Court may also provide official interpretations of Mongolian law, except for the Constitution of Mongolia. Official interpretations are made through a special procedure referred to as a 'sitting en banc'.

Justices of the Supreme Court of Mongolia are appointed by the President of Mongolia after being presented by the Judicial General Council of Mongolia. The Supreme Court consists of a Chief Justice and 24 subordinate Justices. The Chief Justice is appointed by the President of Mongolia for a term of six years for one time. Presently, the Justices manage cases through three separate chambers: a Chamber for Criminal Cases, a Chamber for Administrative Cases and a Chamber for Civil Cases. Cases coming before each chamber are generally heard by a panel of five Justices.

The Chief Justice of the Court sits as a member of the Judicial General Council of Mongolia, which is tasked with the general supervision of the judicial system.
