= Constitutional Court of Mongolia =

- Монгол Улсын Үндсэн хуулийн цэц
- Emblem of the Constitutional Court of Mongolia
- Established: 1992
- Location: Ulaanbaatar, Mongolia
- Composition method: Appointed by State Great Khural upon nomination from State Great Khural, President and the Supreme Court
- Authorised by: Constitution of Mongolia
- Judge term length: 6 years
- Number of positions: 9
- Website: constitutionalcourt.mn

Chief Justice
- Currently: Juujaagiin Erdenebulgan
- Since: 26 June 2026

The Constitutional Court of Mongolia is the highest court in Mongolia with the function of exercising supreme control over the implementation of the Constitution, issuing conclusions on violations of its provisions, and strictly enforcing the implementation of the Constitution.

The main principles of Tsets's activities are to be subject to the Constitution of Mongolia, to uphold the laws in accordance with the Constitution of Mongolia, to be based on research, to be neutral, independent and transparent. Any organization, official, or citizen is prohibited from interfering or influencing the activities of Tsets.

The Constitutional Tsets consists of nine members. A member of the Tsets must be a citizen of Mongolia who has high legal and political professional standing, is without a criminal record against and has reached 40 years of age. In accordance with the law, the members of the Constitutional Court are appointed by the State Great Khural for a term of six years, with three of them to be nominated by the State Great Khural, three by the President of Mongolia and three by the Supreme Court of Mongolia.

Questions regarding laws other than the Constitution are the province of the Supreme Court of Mongolia.

== Organization ==
The term of office of the newly appointed or filled in vacancy, member of the Tsets commences on the day of appointment and continues until the expiration of their term of office as provided for in the Constitution. The Chief Justice of the Constitutional Court co-ordinates its activities. Nine members of the Tsets propose from among themselves the name of a person who is to be elected Chief Justice and elect the person who receives the majority of votes as the Chief Justice of the Tsets is elected for a term of three years and may be re-elected only once. The State Great Hural determines and adopts the funds for the budget of the Tsets, the salary fund for the Tsets, and the salaries of members of Tsets upon the proposal of the Chief Justice.

== Current member ==
Name	Recommended by	Education	Appointed on	End of term
Juujaagiin Erdenebulgan (born 1970) (Chief Justice of the Constitutional Court of Mongolia)	Supreme Court of Mongolia	National University of Mongolia	26 March 2021	26 March 2027
Dashbalbaryn Gangabaatar (born 1978)	Supreme Court of Mongolia	Institute of Foreign language National University of Mongolia; Nagoya University	7 October 2021	7 October 2027
Odonkhüügiin Mönkhsaikhan (born 1983)	Supreme Court of Mongolia	National University of Mongolia; Nagoya University	16 November 2023	16 November 2029
Erdeneegiin Enkhtuya (born 1977)	President of Mongolia; Ukhnaagiin Khürelsükh	National University of Mongolia; Kyushu University	16 November 2023	16 November 2029
Tsedeviin Tsolmon (born 1973)	State Great Khural	Omsk State Technical University; National University of Mongolia; University of Exeter; Columbia University	30 May 2024	30 May 2030
Byambadorjiin Boldbaatar (born 1968)	President of Mongolia; Ukhnaagiin Khürelsükh	Moscow Automobile and Road Construction State Technical University; National University of Mongolia	30 May 2024	30 May 2030
Ragchaagiin Batragchaa (born 1977)	President of Mongolia; Ukhnaagiin Khürelsükh	Otgontenger university National University of Mongolia	30 May 2024	30 May 2030
Jamiyankhorloogiin Sükhbaatar (born 1970)	State Great Khural	National University of Mongolia	26 June 2026	26 June 2032
Gombojavyn Erdenebat (born 1972)	State Great Khural	University of Internal Affairs of Mongolia; National Defense University	26 June 2026	26 June 2032

== Jurisdiction ==
The Tsets shall consider and deliver a judgment, and, if necessary, reconsider the matter and make a final decision on the following disputes regarding the constitutionality of:

1. law and other decisions of the State Great Hural
2. decrees and other decisions of the President of Mongolia
3. decisions of the government
4. international treaties to which Mongolia is a signatory party
5. decisions of the Central electoral body on referendums
6. elections of the State Great Hural, its members, and the President

The Tsets shall consider and deliver a judgment on acts of non-compliance with the Constitution of the following officials:

1. the President of Mongolia
2. the Chairman of the State Great Hural
3. a member of the State Great Hural
4. the Prime Minister
5. a member of the Government
6. the Chief Justice of the Supreme Court
7. the Prosecutor General

The Tsets shall consider and deliver a judgment on existence of grounds for the resignation or withdrawal of the following officials:

1. the President of Mongolia
2. the Chairman of the State Great Hural
3. the Prime Minister
4. a Member of the State Great Hural

If claims filed to the Tsets contain claims within jurisdictions of other courts and authorities, the Tsets shall make a judgment on the claim within its jurisdiction and refrain from resolving claims or parts of claims outside its jurisdiction. This shall not constitute an obstacle to action on claims or parts of claims by relevant courts and authorities.

== Symbol ==
The Constitutional Court has its own emblem and its members wear judicial robes in line with international standards and Mongolian statehood traditions.

“The symbol of the Constitutional Court of Mongolia” is round-shaped and carries the words “Constitutional Court of Mongolia” in Cyrillic around the edge with male and female fish on the top, and the combination of scale with black and white cups and stretched bow and arrow in the center. The male and female fish on the top expresses the idea that the Constitutional Court shall safeguard vigilantly the nation’s Constitution without blinking the eyes and shall act while balancing the scales of truth. The balancing scale with black and white cups symbolizes that the Constitutional Court shall consider any constitutional disputes basing on strict observance of the law, and using the best of intellectual brain and issue honest and accurate decision. The stretched bow and arrow symbolized that the Constitutional Court decision shall be precise, sharp and fair. The words “Constitutional Court of Mongolia”, male and female fish image and the frame around shall be in golden color symbolizing the ever shining sun, while the scale, the stretched bow and arrow shall be placed on blue round-shaped background representing the eternal blue sky.

== See also ==
- Constitution
- Constitutionalism
- Constitutional economics
- Jurisprudence
- Judiciary
- Rule of law
- Rule According to Higher Law
