= Constitution of Mongolia =

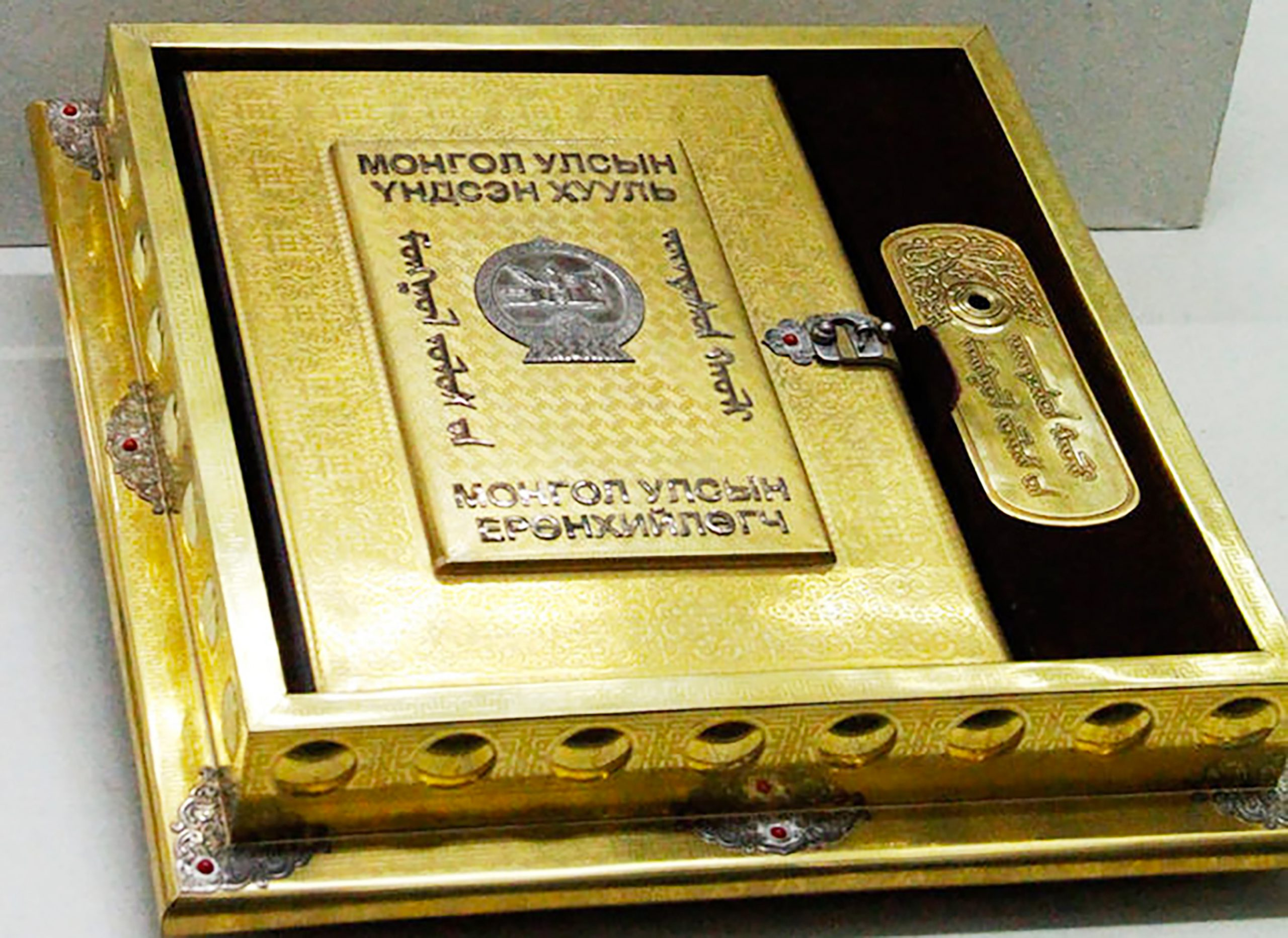
- Original copy of the 1992 Constitution

Overview
- Original title: Монгол Улсын Үндсэн хууль
- Jurisdiction: Mongolia
- Ratified: 13 January 1992
- Date effective: 12 February 1992
- System: Unitary parliamentary constitutional republic

Government structure
- Branches: Three
- Head of state: President
- Chambers: Unicameral (State Great Khural)
- Executive: Prime Minister led cabinet
- Judiciary: Constitutional Court Supreme Court
- Federalism: No
- Electoral college: No

History
- First legislature: 20 July 1992
- First executive: 6 June 1993 (President); 21 July 1992 (PM)
- Amendments: 4
- Last amended: 31 May 2023
- Location: Ulaanbaatar
- Commissioned by: People's Great Khural
- Supersedes: Constitution of the Mongolian People's Republic

The Constitution of Mongolia (Note: Mongolian: Монгол Улсын Үндсэн Хууль, romanized: Mongol Ulsiin Ündsen Khuuli, pronounced [mɔ́ɴɢɞɬ ʊɬsíɴ úntsɘɴ χʊ́ːɬʲ]; lit. 'Fundamental Law of Mongolia') was adopted on 13 January 1992, put into force on 12 February, with amendments made in 1999, 2000, 2019, 2022, and 2023. The constitution established a representative democracy in Mongolia, enshrining core functions of the government, including the separation of powers and election cycle, and guaranteeing human rights, including freedom of religion, travel, expression, and private property. The document was written after the Mongolian Revolution of 1990, effectively dissolving the Mongolian People's Republic and ending the one-party rule.

It consists of a preamble followed by six chapters divided into seventy articles. It is heavily inspired by Western liberal democracies, evident in its protection of minority rights, freedom of expression and assembly, and multi-party parliamentary system.

== Constitutional history ==
After the 1921 Revolution that overthrew the Buddhist theocratic khanate, the first codified constitution was introduced in 1924 with the creation of the Mongolian People's Republic.

A second constitution was adopted in June 1940 during the leadership of Premier Khorloogiin Choibalsan. The 1940 Constitution took the 1936 Soviet Constitution as its model. Elections were restricted—"enemies of the regime" could not vote—and indirect; lower bodies elected higher levels, but constitutional amendments after 1944 changed the system.

In 1951, the presidium of the MPR, the Little Khural, was abolished and its functions were transferred to the existing State Great Khural, which was renamed to the People's Great Khural.

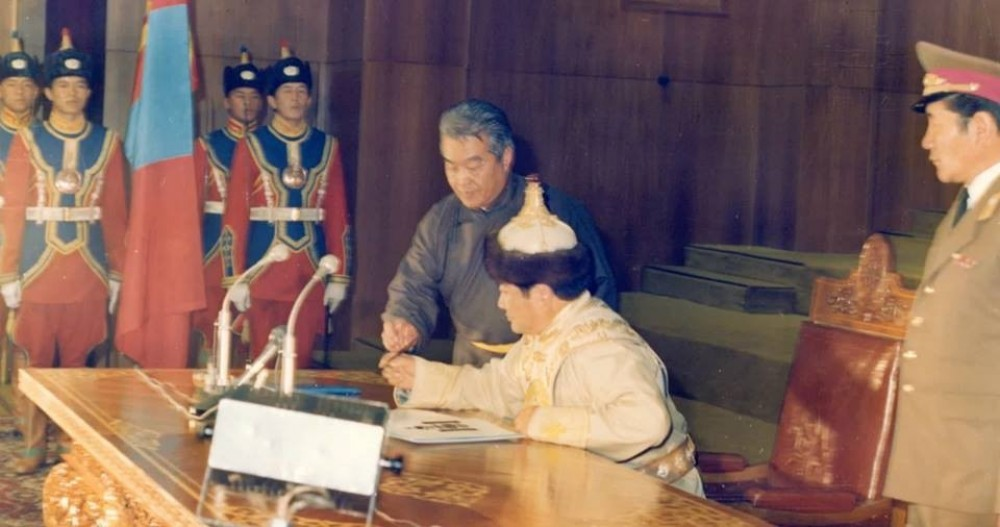
Mongolia's 1st President Punsalmaagiin Ochirbat ratifying the 1992 Constitution.

In July 1960, a third constitution was adopted by the People's Great Khural.

In the aftermath of the 1990 Democratic Revolution, a fourth constitution was ratified on 13 January 1992. It transitioned the country from a socialist party state to a unitary parliamentary sovereign republic. The 1992 constitution dissolved the People's Great Khural (upper house) and the State Little Khural (lower house), restructured the legislative branch of government, and ultimately created a new unicameral legislature, the State Great Khural. The official name of Mongolia was changed from the Mongolian People's Republic to Mongolia. A new state flag, emblem, and anthem were adopted.

== Contents ==
Chapter one declares the sovereignty and territorial integrity of the state, defines the relationship between religion and state, and defines the Mongolian emblem, flag, and anthem.

Chapter two specifies the civil, political, and inalienable rights of the individual: freedom of speech, of religion, of expression, of the press, the right to vote, equality before the law, the right to government-provided health care, education, and intellectual property. It also lists duties of the citizen, including paying taxes and serving in the armed forces. While chapter three defines the structure of the legal system, the form of the republic, and the structure of the government, chapter four codifies the administrative districts of Mongolia and describes the relationship between national and local government.

Chapter five establishes a Constitutional Court to make rulings on the interpretation of the constitution, while chapter six describes the amendment process for changing it.

== Amendments ==
=== Amendments of 2019 ===
In 2019, Mongolia amended its constitution, strengthening the powers of the prime minister in a bid to end years of political instability and economic stagnation. With the amendments, the presidential term was also shortened to a single 6-year term. The amendments in the constitution were supposed to enhance the economic opportunities of the Mongolian citizenry and give them better control over how the country's vast natural resources and the revenues earned from them are maintained. Furthermore, the amendments increased the independence of the judiciary by stripping the president of his power to appoint judges in key posts and establishing parliamentary rather than executive oversight over judicial matters. The amendments featured vigorous participation of ordinary people as well as incumbent politicians. Proportional representation as a system to elect lawmakers was rejected, though the constitutional changes guaranteed that election laws would not be changed a year before polls are held.

=== Amendments of 2022 ===
In 2022, the Constitutional Court found that some of the articles that were amended in 2019 conflicted with other articles of the constitution. The following amended paragraph in the constitutional provision of Article 39.1: "... The Prime Minister and no more than four members of the Government may hold concurrently the position of the Member of the State Great Khural." was invalidated by a constitutional amendment on August 25, 2022.

=== Amendments of 2023 ===
On May 31, 2023, a constitutional amendment that increased the number of seats from 76 to 126 and changed the electoral system from a majoritarian plurality-at-large voting to a mixed proportional system, where 78 members were to be elected by a multiple non-transferable vote in multi-member constituencies and 48 by a closed list proportional representation. The proportional party voting method, previously implemented in 2012, was reintroduced.

== See also ==
- Constitutionalism
- Politics of Mongolia
- State Great Khural
- President of Mongolia
- Prime Minister of Mongolia
