= Jamiyangiin Lhagvasuren =

Mongolian politician and general (1912–1982)

Hero of the Mongolian People's Republic Jamiyangiin Lkhagvasuren
- Жамъянгийн Лхагвасүрэн
- Lkhavgasuren in the late 1930s

Minister of Defence of the Mongolian People's Republic
- In office 28 June 1959 – July 1969
- Leader: Yumjaagiin Tsedenbal
- Preceded by: Sanjiin Bataa
- Succeeded by: Batyn Dorj

Personal details
- Born: 16 March 1912 Saikhan, Bulgan, Mongolia
- Died: 13 May 1982 (aged 70) Ulaanbaatar, Mongolian People's Republic
- Party: Mongolian People's Revolutionary Party
- Spouse: Dashtseden Tsend
- Children: 3
- Education: Frunze Military Academy
- Awards: Hero of the Mongolian People's Republic (2); Order of Sukhbaatar (3); Order of the Red Banner (4); Order of the Polar Star; Order of the Red Star; Order of Suvorov, 2nd class
- Nickname: "The Young commander" (Залуу жанжин)

Military service
- Allegiance: Mongolian People's Republic
- Branch/service: Mongolian People's Army
- Years of service: 1936–1982
- Rank: Colonel General (1944–1982)
- Battles/wars: Soviet–Japanese border conflicts; Battles of Khalkhin Gol; Second World War; Soviet–Japanese War; Invasion of Manchuria

Jamiyangiin Lkhagvasuren (Mongolian: Жамъянгийн Лхагвасүрэн; 16 March 1912 – 13 May 1982) was a Mongolian military officer and politician who served as Deputy Commander of the Mongolian People's Army during World War II. From 1939 to 1980, he was a member of the Presidium of the Central Committee and a candidate member, and then a member of the Politburo of the Central Committee of the Mongolian People's Revolutionary Party. He was also a deputy of the Little Khural (1940–1947), and in 1951 he became a member of the People's Great Khural.

He is most notable for leading the Mongolian forces to victory against Imperial Japan in the Battles of Khalkhin Gol and Soviet invasion of Manchuria, and modernizing the Mongolian People's Army into a modern motorized force during his tenure as the Minister of Defence.

== Biography ==
=== Early life and World War II ===
Lkhagvasuren was born in the rural province of modern-day Bulgan to herder Jamyan and his wife Dumaa, a disinherited noble heiress. According to tradition, Lkhagvasuren was sent away to receive a secular education, while his twin brother Zundui was dispatched to a Buddhist monastery for a theological education. After graduating and working for 4 years in his provincial administration, at the age of 20, Lkhagvasuren voluntarily enlisted in the Mongolian People's Army, despite being exempt from the draft due to his education status, serving in the 15th Cavalry Division. From this point onwards, Lkhagvasuren's life was inseparable from the armed forces and he achieved the rank of Colonel General in 1961. In 1935 he became a member of the Mongolian People's Revolutionary Party. For two years (1935–1937) he received military education in Moscow, graduating from courses at the Lenin Military-Political Academy. After graduation, until 1938, he continued to serve at the academy as the head of a group of Mongolian cadets.

Upon returning to Mongolia in January 1939, he was appointed head of the Political Council and Deputy Supreme Commander-in-Chief of the Mongolian People's Revolutionary Army (MPRA). He took part in the Battles of Khalkhin Gol in 1939 and also participated in the hostilities of the Soviet–Japanese War. During the battles, he, in his position as Corps Commissar of the MPRA, was Marshal Georgy Zhukov's deputy in command of the Mongolian cavalry. Towards the end of the war, he also served with General Issa Pliyev in the Soviet-Mongolian Cavalry-Mechanized Group of the Transbaikal Front. In 1944, he became one of the first generals of the Mongolian Army.

=== Post-war ===
In 1951, he graduated from the Frunze Military Academy in Moscow. Upon his return to Mongolia, Lkhagvasuren was put in charge of the Military Academy of Mongolia where he enacted swift reforms to transform the school and bring it into the modern era in just a little more than a year, before returning for the third time to his post as Deputy Minister of Defence in 1953.Beginning in 1955, he became Chief of the General Staff of the People's Army.

In this position, he was responsible for the renovation works at the Sükhbaatar's Mausoleum. In 1956, he headed the committee for physical culture and sports, and became the first president of the Mongolian National Olympic Committee. During his tenure in his Sports Committee role, he oversaw a revolution in sports and fitness in Mongolia, commissioning the building of the Sports Stadium and the Sports Palace, which became the first such centres for sports and national gatherings of its size, and maintains its significance to this day.

== Defence minister ==
For a decade, he was the Minister of People's Troops (in 1968 the ministry was renamed the Ministry of Defense) and commander-in-chief of the Mongolian People's Army. In this position, he undertook a significant reorganization of the Mongolian military. Lkhagvasuren rapidly modernized and motorized the Mongolian People's Army (which had previously consisted of mainly cavalry) into a mechanised, combined arms centered force. During the second wave of repressions in the 1960s by the People's Party of Mongolia, Lkhagvasuren was the subject of political targeting owing to his massive popularity with the people which led to a concerted effort to remove him from his post as Minister of Defence. After ten years of work in July 1969 he was summoned to a meeting of the Politburo and was dismissed.

== Later life ==
Later he served for two years as Ambassador Extraordinary and Plenipotentiary to Bulgaria and Poland. In 1980 he was elected Deputy Chairman of the Presidium of the Great People's Khural. He retired in March 1982 at the age of 70 and died two months later of a heart attack.

== Family life ==
Lkhagvasuren entered matrimony with Dashtseden Tsend, the adopted daughter of the State Oracle, Choijin Lama, Luvsankhaidav, who was the sibling of the Bogd Khan.

They had three children and nine grandchildren. Their son, Lkhagvaa, graduated from the Zhukovsky Air Force Engineering Academy specializing in aerospace engineering. He later served as the Head of the Civil Aviation Authority of Mongolia and CEO of MIAT Mongolian Airlines. In 1990, he established Mongolia's first private air company, "Hangarid," and has been serving as an Honorary Consul of Thailand in Mongolia for over a decade. The eldest daughter, Lkhagvadulam, is a journalist and Moscow State Pedagogical University alumna. Notably, she translated Paulo Coelho’s best-selling novel "The Alchemist" into Mongolian. The youngest daughter, Lkhagvajav, graduated from the Plekhanov Russian University of Economics and represented Mongolia as a trade attache in the embassy in Poland for eight years.

== Legacy ==
He was posthumously awarded the highest military honor in Mongolia, Hero of the Mongolian People's Republic, after years of pressure on the state and the party from supporters and admirers of the commander. A large bronze monument to was raised in one of the central streets of Ulaanbaatar city in 2000, the year commemorating the 55th anniversary of the end of WWII. A secondary school in his home province of Bulgan was also named after Lkhagvasuren. In 2012, Mongolia celebrated the centenary of his birth. The 167th Military Unit of the Mongolian Ground Force is named after him.
