= Sereenengiin Givaapil =

Mongolian statesman

Sereenen Givaapil
- Mongolian: Сэрээнэнгийн Гиваапил
- Born: 1906; Chuluut sum Arkhangai Province
- Died: 1938 (aged 31–32); Ulaanbaatar
- Military career
- Allegiance: Mongolian People's Republic
- Branch: State security organs
- Service years: 1925–1934
- Commands: Deputy head of the Internal Security Service (Internal Security Service)
- Conflicts: Suppression of the Tugsbuyant uprising (1930), suppression of the Khuvsgul uprising (1932)
- Awards: Order of the Red Banner

Sereenen Givaapil (Mongolian: Сэрээнэнгийн Гиваапил; 1906, Chuluut sum, Arkhangai Province, Mongolia (then part of the Sain Noyon Khan aimag) – 1938, Ulaanbaatar, Mongolian People's Republic) was a Mongolian communist, activist of the Mongolian People's Revolutionary Party (MPRP), and one of the leaders of the Internal Security Service. He commanded forces in the suppression of the Khuvsgul uprising. He criticized Soviet interference in the affairs of the Mongolian People's Republic and the policies of Khorloogiin Choibalsan. Arrested during the period of the Great Repression, he was sentenced to death and executed. He was posthumously rehabilitated.

== Early life ==
He was born into a herder (arat) family in the Sain Noyon Khan aimag of Bogd Khanate of Mongolia (present-day Chuluut sum of Arkhangai Province). From the age of fourteen he worked as a weaver. He learned to read and write and earned a living writing letters for others. He positively supported the Mongolian Revolution of 1921 and the establishment of the Mongolian People's Republic.

== Counter-insurgency service ==
=== Career in the Internal Security Service ===
In 1925, Givaapil was drafted into the Mongolian People's Revolutionary Army. He served as a clerk and administrative officer. He was a member of the ruling communist party (MPRP).

The leadership of the Internal Security Service recruited literate and capable personnel from party and army ranks. In June 1926, Sereenen Givaapil was transferred to the Internal Security Service (DHK). He proved to be an effective organizer. In 1927 he was appointed commander of security forces in the Khan-Taishir mountain region (now in Govi-Altai Province).

He participated in the suppression of the 1930 Tugsbuyant uprising and was awarded the Order of Military Merit. He was later noted for attempting to avoid large-scale repression and bloodshed. In 1932 he was appointed head of the political department and deputy head of the DHK under Bat-Ochiryn Eldev-Ochir, retaining his post under Davaagiin Namsrai.

=== Suppression of the Khuvsgul uprising ===
see: 1932 armed uprising in Mongolia

In 1932, Sereenen Givaapil led the suppression of the largest anti-communist popular uprising in Mongolia. He served on a special “Commission for Investigation of Political Crimes,” which functioned as an extraordinary party-state authority.

Givaapil led operational command and took part in combat against rebel forces, including units led by commanders Batboldyn Tugj and Chimedyn Sambuu in Khuvsgul and Arkhangai. He directed not only military operations but also the seizure of monasteries and settlements, and ordered executions of prisoners. In recaptured sums such as Jargalant, Tsetserleg, and Bayanzurkh, he quickly restored the previous administrative system. After the suppression of the uprising, he was again awarded the Order of Military Merit.

His unit was considered a shock detachment of government forces. However, Givaapil reportedly attempted to limit the severity of punitive measures. For example, he rejected an instruction from OGPU envoy Ivan Chibisov to use poisoned bullets.

== Conflict, arrest, and execution ==
Sereenen Givaapil was a committed communist but also an advocate of Mongolian sovereignty. He openly criticized Soviet interference in Mongolian politics and supported Peljidiin Genden. He also pointed out that OGPU advisers in the DHK did not understand local Mongolian conditions. This provoked a negative reaction from Soviet representatives and MPRP leadership.

In 1934 he was implicated in the Lhümbe Case. He denied the accusations during interrogation. Although not arrested at that time, he was effectively sent to study in Moscow. He spent about a year at the Communist University of the Toilers of the East. After returning in 1935, he was assigned to economic institutions and excluded from security services. He continued to criticize Choibalsan's policies privately.

He was arrested again during the 1937 purges. Investigators attempted to extract testimony against Genden and Gelegdorjiin Demid, but he refused. He was sentenced to death on standard charges of “conspiracy” and “espionage” and executed in 1938. He was posthumously rehabilitated by the Presidium of the Supreme Court of the MPR in 1962.
