= Sonomyn Luvsangombo =

Mongolian politician (1924–2026)

- Сономын Лувсангомбо

Minister of Public Security
- In office 1982–1984
- Prime Minister: Jambyn Batmönkh
- Preceded by: Ulziihutagiin Chojilsuren
- Succeeded by: Agvaanjantsan Jamsranjav

Mayor of Ulaanbaatar
- In office 1971–1972
- Prime Minister: Yumjaagiin Tsedenbal
- Preceded by: Dogsomyn Tsedev
- Succeeded by: Surenjavyn Balbar

Personal details
- Born: 19 December 1924 Khatanbulag, Dornogovi, Mongolia
- Died: 6 November 2026 (aged 101) Moscow, Russia
- Party: Mongolian People's Revolutionary Party
- Children: 1 daughter
- Profession: Military and civil engineer
- Awards: Order of Sukhbaatar Order of the Red Banner of Merit Order of Polar Star (Mongolia) Order of the Red Banner of Labor

Military service
- Allegiance: Mongolian People's Republic
- Branch/service: Mongolian People's Army
- Years of service: 1944–1989
- Rank: Colonel general

Sonomyn Luvsangombo (Mongolian: Сономын Лувсангомбо; 19 December 1924 – 6 November 2026) was a Mongolian general, engineer and politician. He served as the Minister of Public Security of the Mongolian People's Republic from 1982 to 1984. In the 7th, 8th, 9th and 10th elections, Luvsangombo was elected a deputy to the Great People's Khural. From 1984 to 1989, he served as deputy chairman of the Council of Ministers (government).

At the age of 65, he retired and was relieved of party, government, and military duties in 1989. Following his retirement, he resided in Moscow in his later years. As one of the only ten Mongolian military personnel to hold the rank of colonel general, he became the last living Mongolian colonel general after its discontinuance in 2006.

== Life and career ==
Luvsangombo was born on 19 December 1924 in Tüsheet Khan aimag (present day Khatanbulag, Dornogovi Province), not so long after the establishment of the Mongolian People's Republic.

After attending the Higher Military School in Ulaanbaatar, Luvsangombo studied at the Academy of Military Engineering in the Soviet Union. He was then an instructor and employee of the supply department of the Ministry of Construction between 1948 and 1956, where he was then chief engineer from 1956 to 1959.

From 1952 to 1984, he worked in the office of then Premier Yumjaagiin Tsedenbal as a commissioner.

From 1971 to 1972, he was Chairman of the Executive Office of the People's Assembly of Ulaanbaatar, For ten years after, he served as Deputy Prime Minister and Chairman of the Construction Architecture Commission. In 1982, he became Minister of Public Security. From 1984 to 1989, he served as Deputy Chairman of the Council of Ministers and then retired. In February 1982, he was member of the Politburo of the Central Committee of the MPRP and remained in that capacity until 1989.

He retired at the age of 65 in 1989. He moved his residence to Moscow in 1990 and lived there in his later years until his death.

Luvsangombo died on 6 November 2026, at the age of 101. He was the last living Mongolian to serve as colonel general, a military rank discontinued in 2006, becoming also one of the longest living Mongolian military personnel.

== Awards ==
- Order of Sukhbaatar
- Order of the Polar Star
- Medal of Merit
- Order of Military Merit
