= Ministry of Defense (Mongolia) =

Government ministry of Mongolia

Ministry of Defence of Mongolia
- Mongolian: Монгол Улсын Батлан хамгаалах яам
- Emblem of the Ministry of Defence of Mongolia

Agency overview
- Formed: 29 December 1911
- Jurisdiction: Mongolia
- Headquarters: Ulaanbaatar
- Employees: 80
- Minister responsible: Dambyn Batlut
- Website: Defence Ministry of Mongolia

Footnotes
- Dalai Van Gombosüren was first to serve as Defence Minister

The Ministry of Defence of Mongolia (Mongolian: Монгол Улсын Батлан хамгаалах яам) is a ministry of the Government of Mongolia. According to the Law on the Defence of Mongolia, the Ministry is responsible for developing Defence Policy, coordinating its political, economic, social, legal and military implementation, and exercise civil control over the Mongolian Armed Forces.

The ministry has the following leadership structure:

- Minister of Defence
- Deputy Minister of Defence
- Secretary of State

According to the Law on the Armed forces, the General Staff of the Mongolian Armed Forces is the professional managing body and the headquarters for the Mongolian Armed Forces and operates under the policies approved by the Ministry of Defence. The policies are also approved by the Government cabinet and the Parliament "Ikh Khural" of Mongolia.

== History ==
On 29 December 1911, Mongolia gained independence from the Manchu Empire, and established its first five ministries. One of the ministries was the Ministry of Military Affairs, which was one of the predecessors to the Ministry of Defence. From 1956 to 1959 the ministry took over the Ministry of Internal Affairs. In 1959 the latter again became independent agency again.

Since then, it has operated under the following names:

- Ministry of Military Affairs (1911–1919)
- Ministry of War (1921–1922)
- Ministry of Military Affairs of the People's Government of Mongolia (1922–1924)
- Ministry of Military Affairs of the Mongolian People's Republic (1924–1949)
- Ministry of Defence (1949–1956)
- Ministry of Military and Public Security (1956–1959)
- Ministry of People's Military Affairs (1959–1968)
- Ministry of Defence of the Mongolian People's Republic (1968–1992)
- Ministry of Defence of Mongolia (1992–present)

== Ministry structure ==
The ministry has the following structure:

- Strategic Policy and Implementation Directorate
- Public Administration Directorate
- Policy Implementation Coordination Directorate
- Foreign Cooperation Directorate
- Monitoring Evaluation and Internal Auditing Directorate

== Subordinate institutions/units ==
The following units/institutions are under the direct command of the Ministry of Defence:

- National Defense University – The MNDU is an accredited military university located in Ulaanbaatar and is the country's premier and oldest military educational institution. It prepares officers and NCOs to have grounded leadership skills as well as physical/moral strength.
- Institute for Strategic Studies – The institute was established in February 1990 as a strategic research centre under the Ministry of Defence. In May 2006, the government upgraded the institute's status to a separate research branch of the National Security Council of Mongolia (NSC), acting as a think tank institution.
- Cultural institutions/units
  - Mongolian Military Song and Dance Academic Ensemble
  - Mongolian Military Museum
- Central Archives – The Central Archives has data and documents which date back to the Mongolian Revolution of 1921. The military archives were set up by the Deputy Minister on 8 May 1939, coming into effect on 20 October. In the late 1950s, the government took concrete action to improve the orderly use of the preservation of the country's archives. In 1956, the Ministry of Defence appointed a spokesperson for the archives of the Mongolian People's Army. In the early 1980s, the Mongolian People's Army Central Archives was equipped with personnel who have professional and vocational training and an advanced post-secondary education and in 1988, a new building was created due to the expansion of the archives. Since 2006, it has been under the control of the defence ministry.
- "Baga Bayan" Peace Resort – Established in 1932, it is a living centre and retirement home for elderly veterans of military service.
- State Department Store of the Ministry of Defence "Börte"

== List of ministers of defence ==
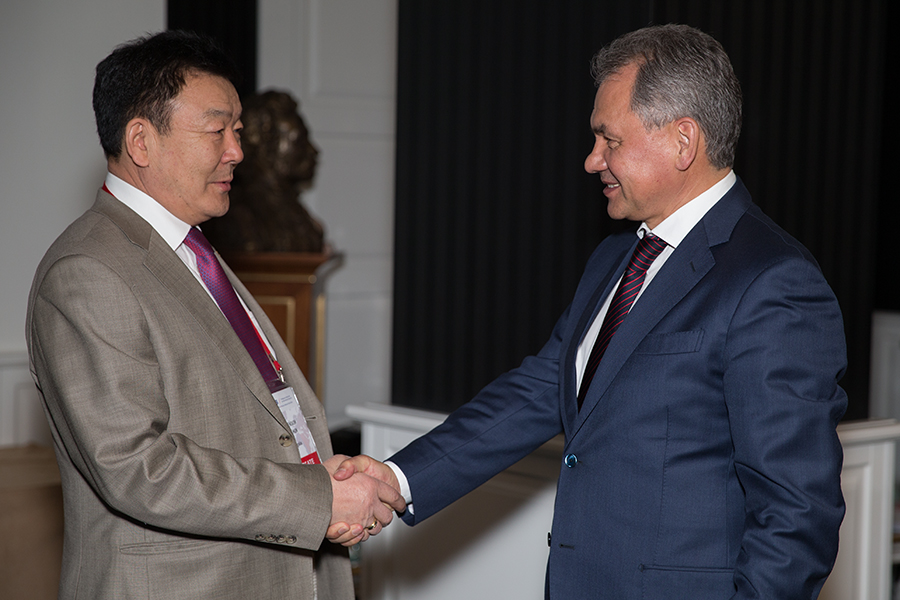
Tserendash Tsolmon with Sergei Shoigu.

Since July 1996, the ministry has been led by a civilian official.

=== Bogd Khanate of Mongolia ===
No.	Portrait	Minister of Defence	Took office	Left office	Time in office	Party
1	Dalai Van Gombosüren [mn]	Dalai Van Gombosüren (1884–1914)	1911	1914	2–3 years	n/a
2	Tögs-Ochiryn Namnansüren	Tögs-Ochiryn Namnansüren (1878–1919)	1914	1919	4–5 years	n/a

=== Mongolian People's Republic ===
No.	Portrait	Minister of Defence	Took office	Left office	Time in office	Party
3	Damdin Sükhbaatar	Damdin Sükhbaatar (1893–1923)	11 July 1921	1 December 1922	1 year, 143 days	MPP
4	Khatanbaatar Magsarjav	Colonel general Khatanbaatar Magsarjav (1877–1927)	1922	1927 †	4–5 years	MPP
5	Khorloogiin Choibalsan	Marshal of the Mongolian People's Republic; Khorloogiin Choibalsan (1895–1952)	1927	1929	1–2 years	MPP
6	Gelegdorjiin Demid	Marshal of the Mongolian People's Republic; Gelegdorjiin Demid (1900–1937)	1930	22 August 1937 †	6–7 years	MPP
7	Khorloogiin Choibalsan	Marshal of the Mongolian People's Republic; Khorloogiin Choibalsan (1895–1952)	1937	26 January 1952 †	14–15 years	MPP
8	Tsedengiin Janchiv	Lieutenant general Tsedengiin Janchiv (1914–1993)	1950	1952	1–2 years	MPP
9	Sanjiin Bataa	Colonel general Sanjiin Bataa (1915–1982)	1952	1956	3–4 years	MPP
10	Batyn Dorj	Colonel general Batyn Dorj (1914–1982)	1956	1959	2–3 years	MPP
11	Jamiyangiin Lhagvasuren	Colonel general Jamiyangiin Lhagvasuren (1912–1982)	28 June 1959	July 1969	10 years	MPP
12	Batyn Dorj	General of the Army; Batyn Dorj (1914–1982)	July 1969	1978	8–9 years	MPP
13	Jarantyn Avkhia	Colonel general Jarantyn Avkhia (1923–1992)	1978	1982	3–4 years	MPP
14	Jamsrangijn Jondon	Colonel general Jamsrangijn Jondon (1923–1992)	1982	1989	6–7 years	MPP
15	Luvsangombyn Molomjamts [mn]	Lieutenant general Luvsangombyn Molomjamts (1935–2022)	1989	September 1990	0–1 years	MPP

=== Modern era ===
No.	Portrait	Minister of Defence	Took office	Left office	Time in office	Party
16	Shagalyn Jadamba	Lieutenant general Shagalyn Jadamba (1940–1996)	September 1990	July 1996	5 years, 10 months	MPP
17	Dambyn Dorligjav	Dambyn Dorligjav (First civilian to hold this post)	19 July 1996	23 April 1998	1 year, 278 days	Democratic
18	Renchinsambuugiin Odonbaatar	Renchinsambuugiin Odonbaatar	23 April 1998	January 1999	8 months	Democratic
19	Sharavdorjiin Tüvdendorj	Sharavdorjiin Tüvdendorj	January 1999	August 2000	1 year, 7 months	Democratic
20	Jügderdemidiin Gürragchaa	Major general Jügderdemidiin Gürragchaa (born 1947)	9 August 2000	20 August 2004	4 years	MPP
21	Badarchiin Erdenebat	Badarchiin Erdenebat	20 August 2004	18 March 2005	210 days	Motherland
22	Tserenkhüügiin Sharavdorj	Tserenkhüügiin Sharavdorj	18 March 2005	28 January 2006	316 days	MPP
23	Mishigiin Sonompil	Mishigiin Sonompil (born 1965)	28 January 2006	5 December 2007	1 year, 311 days	MNDP
24	Jamyandorjiin Batkhuyag	Jamyandorjiin Batkhuyag	5 December 2007	September 2008	8 months	MPP
25	Luvsanvandangiin Bold	Luvsanvandangiin Bold (born 1961)	September 2008	January 2012	3 years, 4 months	Democratic
26	Jadambyn Enkhbayar	Jadambyn Enkhbayar (born 1973)	27 January 2012	17 August 2012	203 days	MPP
27	Dashdembereliin Bat-Erdene	Dashdembereliin Bat-Erdene (born 1963)	17 August 2012	10 December 2014	2 years, 115 days	Democratic
28	Tserendashiin Tsolmon	Tserendashiin Tsolmon	10 December 2014	23 July 2016	1 year, 226 days	MPRP
29	Badmaanyambuugiin Bat-Erdene	Badmaanyambuugiin Bat-Erdene (born 1964)	23 July 2016	20 October 2017	1 year, 89 days	MPP
30	Nyamaagiin Enkhbold	Nyamaagiin Enkhbold (born 1957)	20 October 2017	8 July 2020	2 years, 262 days	MPP
31	Gürsediin Saikhanbayar	Brigadier general Gürsediin Saikhanbayar (born 1968)	8 July 2020	10 July 2024	4 years, 2 days	MPP
32	Sandagiin Byambatsogt	Sandagiin Byambatsogt (born 1974)	10 July 2024	3 June 2025	328 days	MPP
33	Dambyn Batlut	Dambyn Batlut	3 June 2025	Incumbent	1 year, 137 days	MPP
