= Batyn Khurts =

Mongolian intelligence officer (born 1968)

- Батын Хурц

Director of the General Intelligence Agency
- In office November 2014 – 1 November 2017
- Preceded by: Baldanjavyn Ariunsan
- Succeeded by: Dorjpalamyn Gerel

Personal details
- Born: 1969 (age 56–57) Ulaanbaatar, Mongolia
- Party: Democratic Party
- Children: 4
- Education: Moscow State University of Economics, Statistics, and Informatics; FSB Academy

Military service
- Allegiance: Mongolia
- Branch/service: General Intelligence Agency
- Rank: Major general

Batyn Khurts (Mongolian: Батын Хурц; born 1969) is a Mongolian spy, general, and politician who served as the director of the General Intelligence Agency (GIA) from 2014 to 2017. He previously served as the head of Executive Office of the Mongolian National Security Council and the deputy head of the Independent Authority Against Corruption.

== Early life and career ==
Khurts was born in Ulaanbaatar, the capital of the Mongolian People's Republic, in 1969. He completed his secondary education at the No.23 secondary school of Ulaanbaatar in 1988. He studied at the Irkutsk College of Construction in Russia from 1987 to 1990, later studying at the Moscow State University of Economics, Statistics, and Informatics from 1997 to 1999 and FSB Academy from 1999 to 2000. During his study in Moscow, Khurts worked as a representative of the Mongolian company "Silk Road" in Moscow from 1992 to 2000.

He began his career at the General Intelligence Agency (GIA) as an employee in 2000, in that position until 2002. He worked as the first secretary of the Mongolian embassies in Hungary (between 2002 and 2003) and Turkey (between 2003 and 2004). From 2005 to 2006, he served as deputy and later head of a department at the GIA, before working as general representative of MIAT Mongolian Airlines, the national airline of Mongolia, in Seoul.

In 2006, he was investigated for accusations of alleged collaboration with former MIAT executive director R.Bat-Erdene. He held the position of representative from 2006 to 2009, followed by an appointment as head of the Office of the National Security Council, chaired by the President of Mongolia, in 2009. He was briefly investigated by the country's anti-corruption watchdog for concealing his assets and failing to declare his wealth.

== Arrest ==
In September 2010, Khurts traveled to London. Upon landing, he was arrested and put in Wandsworth Prison because of a European Arrest Warrant issued by the German authorities. Consequently, the Mongolian government accused the UK of luring Khurts to London to be arrested.

Khurts was imprisoned for allegedly arranging the kidnapping of Enkhbat Damiran, a Mongolian national who emigrated to France, and sending him back to Mongolia where he was then tortured. It was alleged that around 15 May 2003, Damiran, who was seeking asylum in France at the time, was kidnapped by officers of the General Intelligence Agency of Mongolia outside a restaurant in the French port of Le Havre, smuggled across the border to Brussels, and then to the Mongolian embassy in Berlin. He was briefly held at the embassy before he was drugged and taken in a wheelchair onto a Mongolian MIAT flight to Ulaanbaatar on 18 May. His arrival in Ulaanbaatar was not registered by the border police and he was taken to a secret location outside the capital. He was tortured, unsuccessfully, to confess to the murder of the well-known politician Zorig Sanjaasürengiin, a former Minister of Infrastructure and a potential future prime minister, in 1998. On 24 May, he was registered as a GIA informant and his entry into Mongolia was subsequently registered by the border police as 25 May. During his torture, it was alleged that Damiran was, among other things, forced to sit on a stool for hours, beaten on the liver with a pistol, and subjected to a mock execution.

The Mongolian government apologized earlier for the kidnapping to the French, German and Belgian governments.

Khurts' arrest had led to tensions between the governments of Mongolia and the UK. The controversy has escalated to what has been called "diplomatic war". He was extradited to Germany in 2011 on charges of Verschleppung (abduction or kidnapping).

In September 2011, the charges of Verschleppung were dropped against Mr Khurts, three weeks ahead of a visit to Mongolia by German Chancellor Angela Merkel, and he was released from prison and returned to Mongolia.

== Later career ==
Khurts was appointed as deputy head of the Independent Authority Against Corruption (IAAC) in 2011 following his return to Mongolia. During his tenure, he was accused of firing a large number of IAAC employees following his appointment. Eleven people who worked in the IAAC were fired by Khurts. The dismissed employees won in court in 2013. He held the post until November 2014 when he was appointed director of the GIA by the Government of Mongolia, headed by Norovyn Altankhuyag.

On 28 December 2015, Khurts was promoted the rank of major general by then President of Mongolia Tsakhiagiin Elbegdorj.

On 1 November 2017, Khurts was relieved from his post as GIA director by the cabinet and succeeded by Dorjpalamyn Gerel. Later that month, Khurts was nominated for ambassadorship in South Korea by the cabinet of then Prime Minister Ukhnaagiin Khürelsükh. However, his nomination, despite being approved by the Standing Committee on Security and Foreign Policy, wasn't supported by the State Great Khural.
