= Tsedengiin Janchiv =

Mongolian politician (1914–1993)

Tsedengiin Janchiv Цэдэнгийн Жанчив

Minister of Interior of the Mongolian People's Republic
- In office 1952–1956
- Preceded by: Damdinnerangiin Bath
- Succeeded by: Batyn Dorj

Minister of Defense of the Mongolian People's Republic
- In office 1950–1952
- Preceded by: Khorloogiin Choibalsan
- Succeeded by: Sanjiin Bataa

Personal details
- Born: 1914
- Died: 1993 (aged 78–79)
- Party: Mongolian People's Party
- Education: Lenin Military-Political Academy

Tsedengiin Janchiv (Mongolian: Цэдэнгийн Жанчив) (1914-1993) was a Mongolian communist politician who served as Minister of Defense from 1950 to 1952 and Minister of Internal Affairs from 1952 to 1956.

== Biography ==
He was born in Bor Tolgoi, a place behind the Zuun Bogd mountain, present-day Övörkhangai Province, as the second son of a herder, Kh. Tsedengiin.

After graduating from school in 1928, he worked as a sum clerk, shopkeeper, and union cell head from 1929. After graduating from the Central Party School of the Mongolian People's Revolutionary Party in 1930, he worked as an assistant, full and senior representative, and head of a special unit and department in the Internal Security Department. In 1935–1936, he completed a special professional course in the Soviet Union, and in 1943–1947, he graduated from the Lenin Military-Political Academy in Moscow.

In 1948–1950, he was Deputy Chief of the General Staff of the Mongolian Armed Forces, in 1950–1952 as Minister of National Defense, in 1952–1956 as Minister of Internal Affairs, in 1956–1958, Head of the Non-Ferrous Metals Industry Management Department, in 1958–1959, Minister of Geology and Mining of the Mongolian People's Republic, and from 1959 until his retirement, he served as Head of the Ulaanbaatar City Construction Trust, Head of the Ulaanbator City Electrical and Plumbing and Installation Department, Specialist in charge of special construction at the Mines, and Specialist in charge of foreign relations at the Ministry of Construction.

He died in 1993 in Ulaanbaatar.
