= Hero of the Mongolian People's Republic =

Highest distinction in the MPR

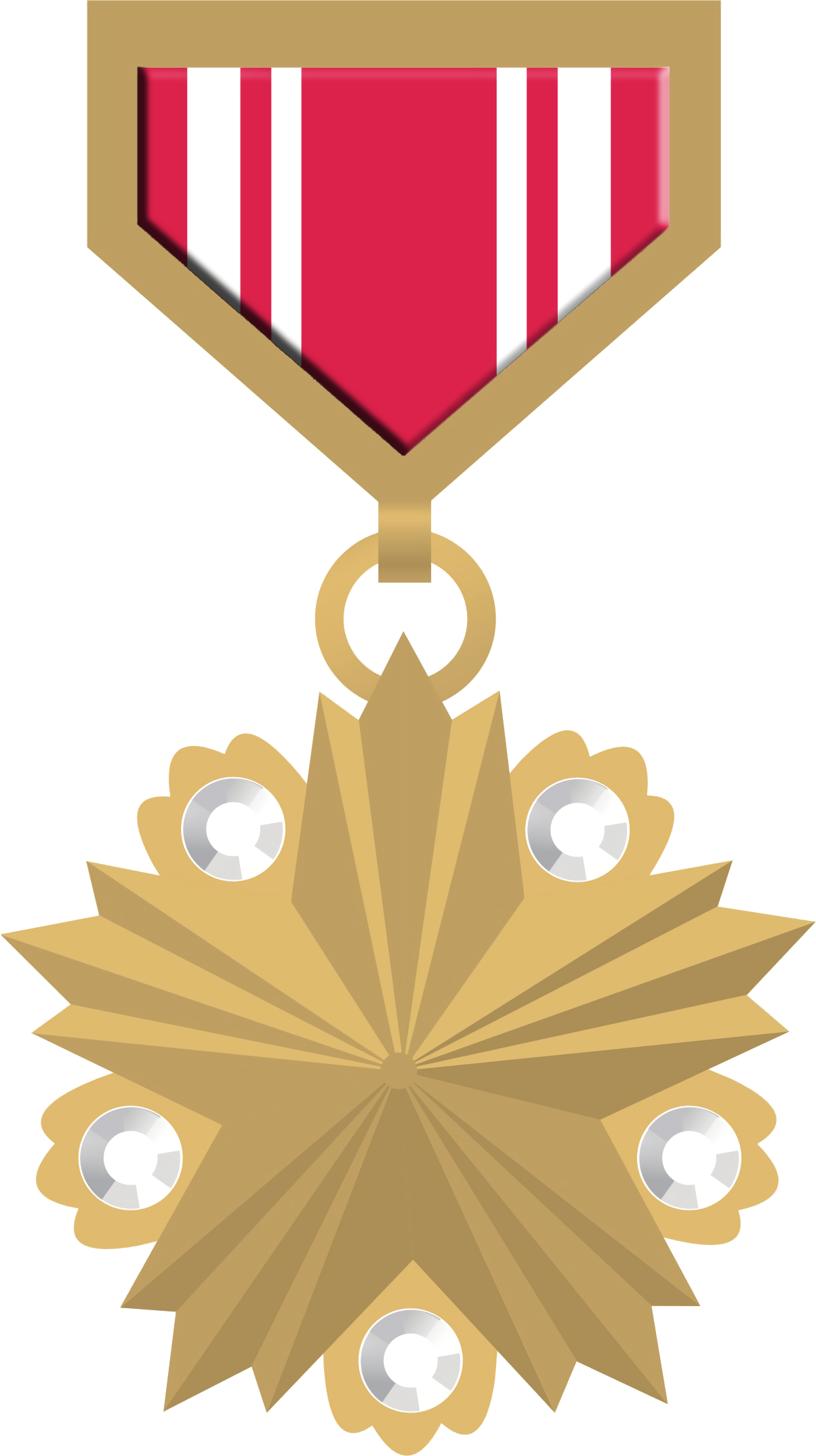
- Gold Star Medal of Hero of the Mongolian People's Republic
- Type: Honorary title
- Awarded for: Heroic feats in service to the people of Mongolia
- Presented by: Mongolian People's Republic
- Eligibility: Mongolian and foreign citizens
- First award: 23 September 1922
- Final award: 19 July 1989

Highlights
- Total: 59
- Total awarded posthumously: 2
- Ribbon
- Related: Hero of Labour of the Mongolian People's Republic

The title Hero of the Mongolian People's Republic was the highest distinction in the Mongolian People's Republic (MPR). It was modeled on the Soviet Union's highest award, the Hero of the Soviet Union title.

== History ==
Soon after the victory of the Mongolian Revolution of 1921, the new government formed high degrees of distinction, which was appropriated by the Provisional People's Government . The first such title was the title of "Fearless Hero of the Mongolian People's State", which was awarded on September 23, 1922, to Damdin Sükhbaatar. On April 24, 1924, the title of "Unyielding People's Hero" was awarded to his colleague Khatanbaatar Magsarjav. Two more Mongolian servicemen were awarded this title for heroism in battles on the border with Manchuria in 1936. In 1945, a special insignia was introduced for those awarded the title of Hero of the Mongolian People's Republic: the Gold Star of the Hero of the MPR.

== Notable Recipients ==
=== Mongolian ===
- Damdin Sükhbaatar – Minister of War of Mongolia
- Khatanbaatar Magsarjav – Former Prime Minister of Mongolia
- Khorloogiin Choibalsan – Marshal of the Mongolian People's Republic
- Yumjaagiin Tsedenbal – Chairman of the Presidium of the People's Great Khural
- Batyn Dorj – Minister of Defense of the Mongolian People's Republic
- Butochiyn Tsog – Mongolian general
- Jügderdemidiin Gürragchaa – Mongolian Cosmonaut
- Bagziin Givaan – Veteran of Border Guards who took part in the Battle of Baitag Bogd.
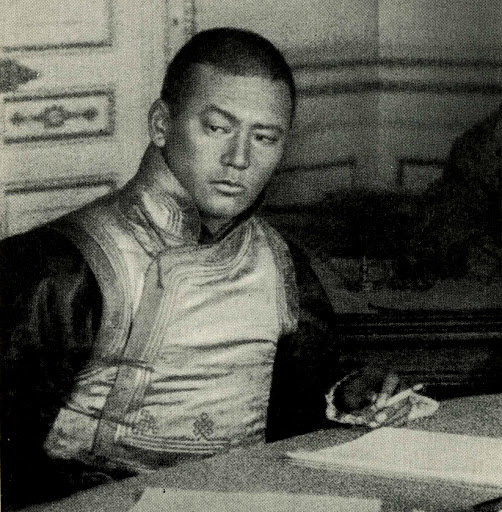
Damdin Sükhbaatar

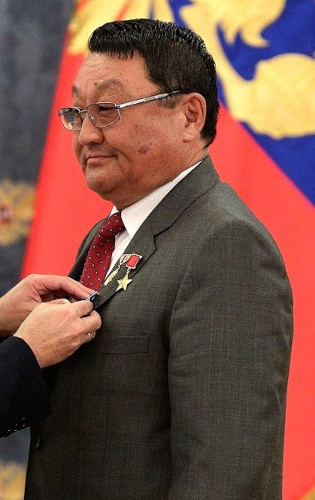
Jügderdemidiin Gürragchaa

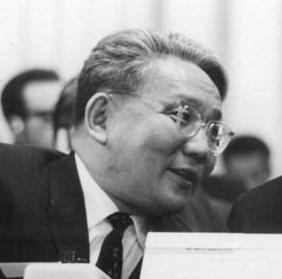
Yumjaagiin Tsedenbal

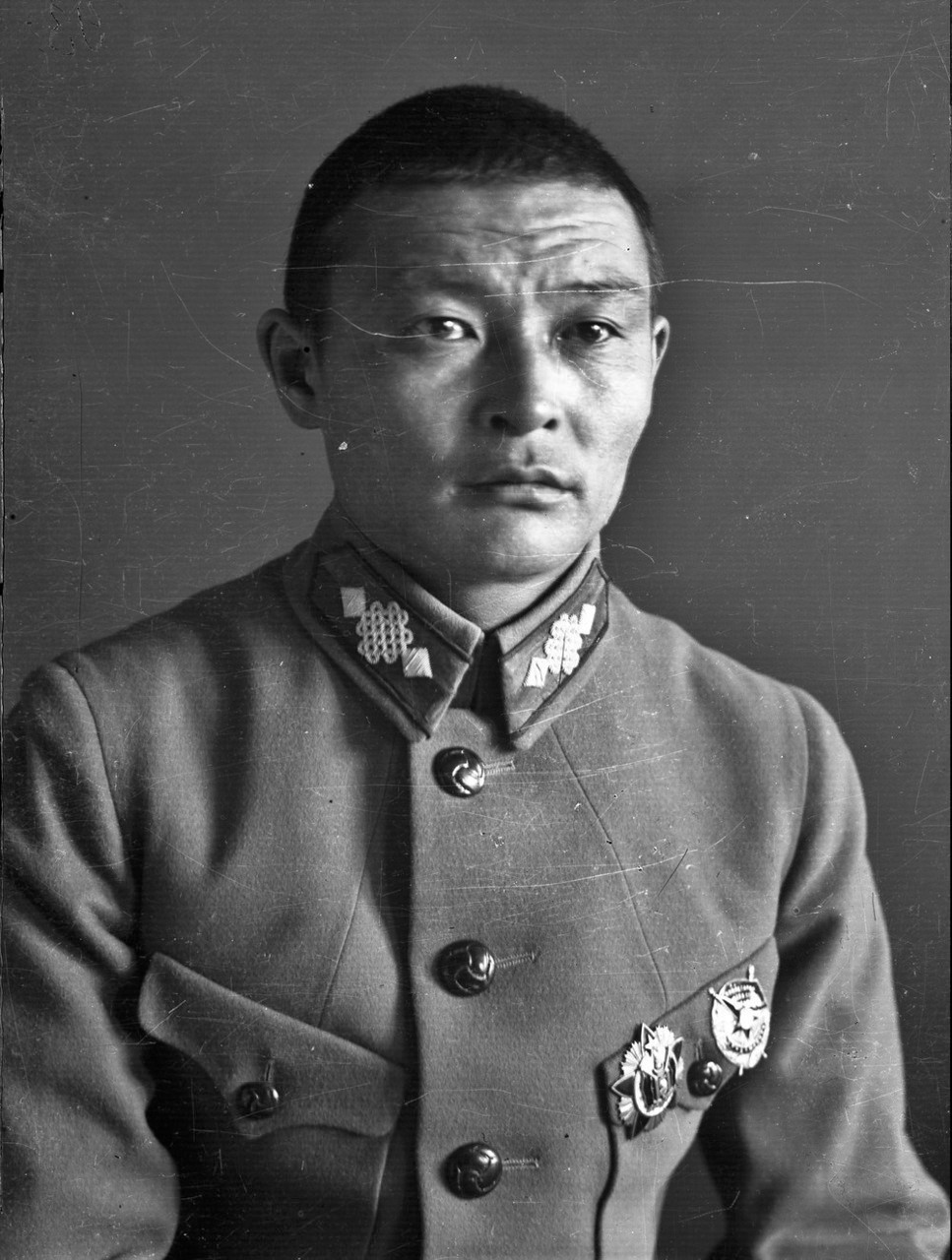
Khorloogiin Choibalsan

=== Foreign ===
- Joseph Stalin – Leader of the Soviet Union
- Kliment Voroshilov – Chairman of the Supreme Soviet of the USSR
- Gherman Titov – Soviet Cosmonaut
- Andriyan Nikolayev – Soviet Cosmonaut
- Pavel Belyayev – Soviet Cosmonaut
- Georgy Zhukov – Marshal of the Soviet Union
- Ivan Konev – Marshal of the Soviet Union
- Issa Pliyev – General of the Army (Soviet Union)
- Leonid Brezhnev – General Secretary of the Communist Party of the Soviet Union
- Alexei Kosygin – Prime Minister of the Soviet Union
- Dmitry Ustinov – Minister of Defense of the Soviet Union
Joseph Stalin

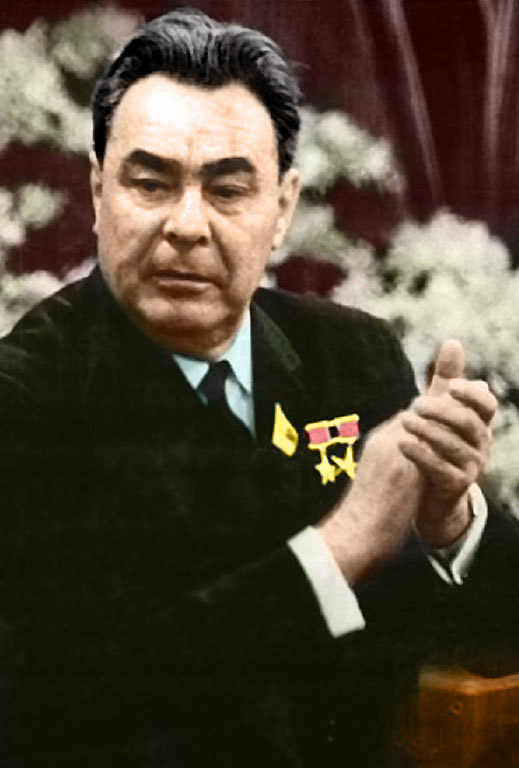
Leonid Brezhnev

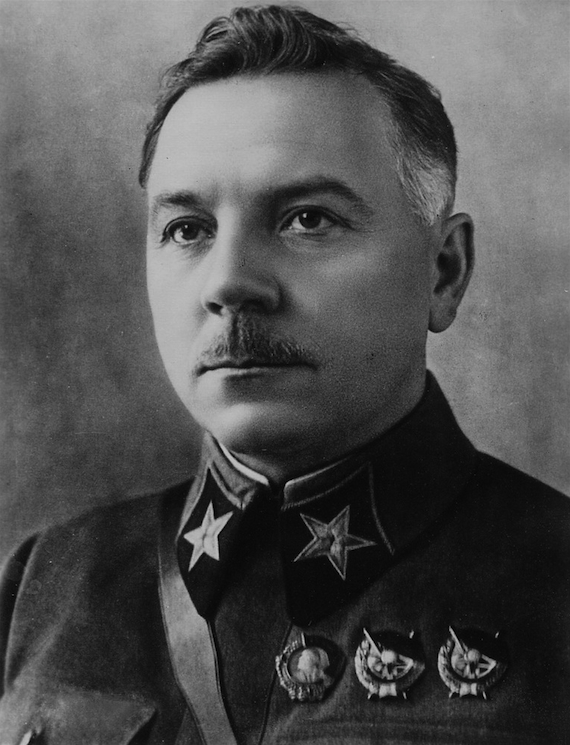
Kliment Voroshilov

== See also ==
- Orders, decorations, and medals of Mongolia

== Links ==
- «Золотая Звезда Героя МНР» на сайте Награды Монголии
