= Shagalyn Jadambaa =

Chief of the General Staff of the Mongolian Armed Forces

Shagalyn Jadamba
- Шагалын Жадамба
- Born: 1940; Govi-Altai Province, Mongolia
- Died: 1996 (aged 55–56); Ulaanbaatar, Mongolia
- Children: Jadambyn Enkhbayar
- Military career
- Allegiance: Mongolian People's Republic
- Branch: Mongolian People's Army
- Service years: 1950s—1996
- Rank: Lieutenant general
- Commands: Ministry of Defense (Mongolia)(1990-1996)

Lieutenant general Shagalyn Jadamba (Mongolian: Шагалын Жадамба) was a Mongolian military leader and Minister of Defense of the Mongolian People's Republic from September 1990 to July 1996. He was a member of the Mongolian People's Party.

== Career ==
He was born in 1940 in Khaliun District, Govi-Altai Province. He joined the Mongolian People's Army at the age of 20 and began serving in the Army Chemical Protection Company. Shortly after joining the army, he graduated from the Far Eastern Higher Combined Arms Command School in Blagoveshchensk, Russia. He worked as a company commander and tactical instructor at the Military University. During this time, he worked at all levels of the army. He graduated with honors from the Frunze Military Academy and the Voroshilov Academy of the General Staff (1974–1976). He was appointed First Deputy General Staff and Chief of Operations of the People's Army in 1974, and First Deputy Chief of the First Department of the Ministry of Defense in 1979. During his training of astronauts in Moscow in 1980-1981, General Jadambaa worked with them as a representative of the Ministry of Defense.

He served from 1986 to October 1990 as Chief of General Staff. after his term expired, he became defense minister, the first one in the post-communist Mongolian state. After spats between government members arose over how former party secretary Yumjaagiin Tsedenbal should be buried, Jadamba ordered that he be buried with the honors of a general instead of a marshal. His last appearance in Mongolian politics was in 1996, after which President Punsalmaagiin Ochirbat awarded him with the Order of Sukhbaatar before he retired the same year.

== Personal life ==
His son Jadambyn Enkhbayar is a three time member of parliament from the MPP, elected first in 2004 from Gobi-Altai. He is also a lawyer and businessman.

== Accomplishments ==
Jadamba, together with his colleagues, developed the National Security Concept of Mongolia, which was developed in the early 1990s through his leadership. In 1993, the State Great Hural approved his Law on Defense, Law on Universal Military Duty and the Legal Status of Military Servicemen. Many of his initiatives have been engrained in the modern Mongolian military.
