= Sanjiin Bataa =

Mongolian politician (1915–1982)

Sanjiin Bataa Санжийн Батаа

Minister of Defense of the Mongolian People's Republic
- In office 1952–1956
- Preceded by: Tsedengiin Janchiv
- Succeeded by: Batyn Dorj

Mayor of Ulaanbaatar
- In office 1959–1962
- Preceded by: Budin Batjargal
- Succeeded by: Luvsanchoimbol Mangaljav

Personal details
- Born: 1915
- Died: 1982 (aged 66–67)
- Citizenship: Mongolia
- Party: Mongolian People's Party
- Education: Lenin Military-Political Academy

Sanjiin Bataa (Mongolian: Санжийн Батаа; 1915, Central aimag of Inner Mongolia (now Bayandelger Sum, Töv Province, Mongolia) – August 10, 1982) was a Mongolian politician, statesman and military figure who served as Minister of Defense of the Mongolian People's Republic from 1952 to 1956 and Mayor of Ulaanbaatar from 1959 to 1962.

== Biography ==
After finishing school, he worked in a cooperative from 1931 to 1936. In 1936, he was drafted into the Mongolian army. In 1945, he graduated from the Lenin Military-Political Academy in Moscow.

In 1946–1950 he was head of the department of the Mongolian People's Democratic Party, deputy head of the department.

In 1950, he was appointed deputy minister of defense and head of the department. Minister of Defense of the Mongolian People's Republic from 1952 to 1956.

In 1956, when the Ministry of Defense took over the Ministry of Internal Affairs and the combined, Ministry of Military and Public Security was created, he was appointed first deputy minister and commander of the Mongolian People's Army.

Since 1956 he was engaged in diplomatic work. In 1956–1959 he was the ambassador of the Mongolian People's Republic to the Soviet Union. In 1956, he was appointed Chairman of the Mongolian Committee for Friendship and International Cultural Relations.

In 1959–1962 he served as the Chairman (mayor) of the executive committee of the People's Assembly of Ulaanbaatar.

From 1962 he was head of the Department of the Central Committee of the MPRP. In 1966 he headed of the Administrative Department of the Central Committee of the MPRP, and then he headed the Administrative and Organizational Department of the Central Committee of the MPRP.

From 1963 until the end of his life, he was elected as a deputy of the Great People's Khural, was a member of the Presidium of the Great People's Khural, from 1966 to 1969 - Deputy Chairman of the Presidium of the Great People's Khural. He held the rank of Colonel General.
