= Corruption in Mongolia =

Corruption in Mongolia remains a significant issue that affects its economic development and erodes public trust in state institutions. The existing state instrumentalities and legal frameworks fail to completely eradicate corrupt practices, which continue to persist across various sectors. Mongolia ranked 124th out of 182 countries in Transparency International’s 2025 Corruption Perceptions Index, with a score of 31 out of 100, continuing a fall from its highest scores of 39 in 2014 and 2015. This stagnation reflects long-standing concerns about the effectiveness of anti-corruption measures and the entrenchment of elite interests in political and economic spheres.

== High corruption ==
High-profile scandals have underscored the depth of corruption in Mongolia’s political establishment. Recent examples include the scandal in 2022, which implicated the state-owned coal company Erdenes-Tavan Tolgoi JSC. Its senior officials reportedly engaged in illicit contracts and smuggling operations. The scandal, often referred to as the "coal theft" case, involved the alleged conspiracy between these officials and business leaders to transport large quantities of coal into China without proper customs registration. An estimated 40 trillion Mongolian tugrik (US$13 billion) in terms of potential revenue was lost to the Mongolian government. The scandal also included members of the State Great Khural in addition to the executives who had signed secret offtake agreements with foreign entities. After the arrest and incarceration of top executives, two members of the parliament lost their positions on March 30, 2023. The scandal had triggered mass protests and intensified scrutiny of the members of Mongolian People’s Party (MPP), highlighting the blurred lines between political authority and business interests.

The resignation of Prime Minister Luvsannamsrain Oyun-Erdene in June 2025 also demonstrated serious allegations of corruption. His departure followed a parliamentary vote of no confidence, sparked by a wave of public outrage after viral social media posts exposed the extravagant lifestyle of his son. Protests erupted after posts shared via social media exhibited his luxury cars, designer handbags, and helicopter rides – all raising suspicions about ill-gotten wealth, particularly amid Oyun-Erdene's claims of modest origins. Although no formal evidence of corruption was presented, the episode amplified public discontent over perceived misuse of public funds and deepened mistrust toward elected officials.

== Judicial corruption ==
Judicial corruption also remains a critical issue in Mongolia, undermining the rule of law and public confidence in legal institutions. Surveys conducted by the Independent Authority Against Corruption (IAAC) between 2016 and 2021 ranked the judiciary among the most corrupt sectors, with corruption prevalence rate of 38.6 percent in 2016. The judiciary's corruption prevalence rating consistently increased, reaching 53.3 percent in 2019, making it the most corrupt government institution for that year.

In 2019, 17 judges were also dismissed by the National Security Council (NSC), including several Supreme Court justices. This raised alarms about political interference in the Mongolian judiciary. The move followed emergency amendments to the Law on Legal Status of Judges, which granted the NSC sweeping powers to suspend judges based on recommendations from the Judicial General Council—a body whose members were all appointed by the President. Transparency International criticized these actions as threats to judicial independence and due process. The constitutional crisis was resolved in November 2019 with amendments to the Constitution of Mongolia, which empowered the judiciary's independence and limited the presidential term and executive oversight.

There is also the case of the autonomy of the Prosecutor’s Office and the internal independence of the prosecutors in Mongolia. According to an OECD report, political bodies are involved in the appointment and dismissal of the leadership of the Prosecutor’s Office, exposing it to political interference.

== Anti-corruption initiatives ==
Mongolia has improved on its legal framework for addressing corruption and this include the enactment of several anti-corruption laws and institutional reforms, including the 2006 Anti-Corruption Law and the establishment of the IAAC. More recently, the 2023 National Anti-Corruption Strategy introduced e-procurement systems and strengthened political party transparency requirements. The Mongolian government has also touted recent amendments to its criminal code, the increase in judicial budget and the improvements in judicial independence as part of its anti-corruption measures. However, implementation gaps persist. The absence of a whistleblower protection law and limited prosecutorial capacity hinder effective enforcement. The OECD’s 2024 monitoring report emphasized the need for improved coordination among anti-corruption bodies and enhanced judicial autonomy.

=== Challenges ===
Public perception of corruption remains deeply negative. According to the Global Corruption Barometer, 69% of Mongolians believe government corruption is a major problem, and 22% reported paying bribes to access public services. These figures reflect widespread disillusionment with governance and the perceived impunity of elites. Civil society organizations have called for greater transparency, civic engagement, and reforms to strengthen accountability mechanisms. The Asia Foundation’s SPEAK survey further revealed skepticism about the government’s commitment to fighting grand corruption.

International scrutiny has also intensified. The United Nations Human Rights Committee, during its 2025 review of Mongolia’s compliance with the International Covenant on Civil and Political Rights, expressed concern over high-level corruption and inadequate enforcement of anti-corruption laws. The Committee urged Mongolia to bolster judicial independence, improve transparency in investigations, and ensure accountability for senior officials implicated in corruption cases. These recommendations underscore the global dimension of Mongolia’s anti-corruption efforts and the importance of aligning domestic reforms with international standards.

In Transparency International's 2025 Corruption Perceptions Index, which scored 182 countries on a scale from 0 ("highly corrupt") to 100 ("very clean"), Mongolia scored 31. When ranked by score, Mongolia ranked 124th among the 182 countries in the Index, where the country ranked first is perceived to have the most honest public sector. For comparison with regional scores, the best score among those countries of the Asia Pacific region that appeared in the Index (Note: Afghanistan, Australia, Bangladesh, Bhutan, Brunei Darussalam, Cambodia, China, Fiji, Hong Kong, India, Indonesia, Japan, North Korea, South Korea, Laos, Malaysia, Maldives, Mongolia, Myanmar, Nepal, New Zealand, Pakistan, Papua New Guinea, Philippines, Singapore, Solomon Islands, Sri Lanka, Taiwan, Thailand, Timor-Leste, Vanuatu, Vietnam) was 84, the average score was 45 and the worst score was 15. For comparison with worldwide scores, the best score was 89 (ranked 1), the average score was 42, and the worst score was 9 (ranked 181, in a two-way tie).
