= Order of the Red Banner (disambiguation) =

The Order of the Red Banner is a national award of many now dissolved socialist nations, originally descending from the award in the Soviet Union:

- Order of the Red Banner (Soviet Union), initially, there were various orders of the Russian SFSR, Armenian SSR, Azerbaijan SSR, and the Georgian SSR that went under the name of the Order of the Red Banner.
- Order of the Red Banner (Mongolia)
- Order of the Red Banner (Afghanistan)
- Order of the Red Banner (Czechoslovakia)
- Order of the Red Banner (Hungarian People's Republic)
- Order of the Red Banner (People's Republic of Bulgaria)

== See also ==
- Order of the Red Banner of Labor
