= Military ranks of the Mongolian People's Republic =

The Military ranks of Mongolian People's Republic were the military insignia used by the Mongolian People's Army. The Mongolian People's Republic shared a similar rank structure to those used by the Soviet Armed Forces.

== 1927–1936 ==
=== Higher, senior and middle commanders ===
| Designation | Higher commanders | | | | Senior commanders | | | Middle commanders |
|---|---|---|---|---|---|---|---|---|---|---|---|
| Rank |
| Native name | Армийн командлагч Armiin komandlagch | Корпусын дарга Korpusyn darga | Дивизийн дарга Diviziin draga | бригадын дарга Brigadyn draga | Хорооны дарга Khoroony darga | Хоороны туслах Khoorony tuslakh | Батальюны дарга Bataliony darga | Батальюны туслах Bataliony tuslakh | Сумангийн дарга Sumangiin darga | Сумангийн туслах Sumangiin tuslakh | Салааны дарга Salaany darga |
| Translation | Army commander | Corps commander | Divisional commander | Brigade commander | Regimental commander | Assistant regimental commander | Battalion commander | Assistant battalion commander | Company commander | Assistant company commander | Platoon commander |

=== Junior commanders and enlisted men ===
| Designation | Junior commanders | | | | Enlisted men |
|---|---|---|---|---|---|
| Rank |
| Native name | Ахлагч; Akhlagch | Cалааны туслах Salaany tuslakh | Тасгийн дарга Tasgiin darga | Тасгийн туслах Tasgiin tuslakh | Цэрэг; Tsereg |
| Translation | Quartermaster | Assistant platoon leader | Squad leader | Assistant squad leader | Private |

== 1936–1940 ==
=== Higher, senior and middle commanders ===
| Designation | | Higher commanders | | | | | Senior commanders | | | Middle commanders |
|---|---|---|---|---|---|---|---|---|---|---|---|
| Rank insignia | Gymnastjorka |
| Rank insignia | Sleeve chevron |
| Native name | | Маршал; Marshal | Армийн генерал Armiin gyenyeral | Корпус генерал Korpus gyenyeral | Дивиз генерал Diviz gyenyeral | Бригадын генерал Brigadyn gyenyeral | Хурандаа; Khurandaa | Хошууч; Khoshuuch | Ахмад; Akhmad | ахлах дэслэгч Akhlakh deslegch | дэслэгч Deslegch |
| Translation | | Marshal | Army general | Corps general | Divisional general | Brigadier general | Colonel | Major | Captain | Senior lieutenant | Lieutenant |

=== Junior commanders and enlisted men ===
| Designation | | Junior commanders | | | Enlisted men |
|---|---|---|---|---|---|
| Rank insignia | Gymnastjorka |
| Rank insignia | Sleeve chevron |
| Native name | | Ахлагч; Ahlagch | Жаксаалын дарга Jaksaalyn darga | Сааланы туслах Saalany tuslakh | Байлдагч; Baildagch |
| Translation | | Master sergeant | Quartermaster | Platoon leader assistant | Private |

== 1940–1944 ==
=== Higher, middle and senior commanders ===
| Designation | | Higher commanders | | | | | Senior commanders | | | | Middle-level commanders |
|---|---|---|---|---|---|---|---|---|---|---|---|---|---|
| Rank insignia | Gymnastjorka |
| Rank insignia | Sleeve chevron |
| Native name | | Маршал; Marshal | Армийн генерал Armiin gyenyeral | Корпус генерал Korpus gyenyeral | Дивиз генерал Diviz gyenyeral | Бригадын генерал Brigadyn gyenyeral | Хурандаа; Khurandaa | Дэд хурандаа Ded khurandaa | Хошууч; Khoshuuch | Ахмад; Akhmad | ахлах дэслэгч Akhlakh deslegch | Дэслэгч; Deslegch | Бага дэслэгч Baga deslegch |
| Translation | | Marshal | Army general | Corps general | Divisional general | Brigadier general | Colonel | Lieutenant colonel | Major | Captain | Senior lieutenant | Lieutenant | Junior lieutenant |

=== Junior commanders and enlisted men ===
| Designation | | Junior commanders | | | Enlisted men |
|---|---|---|---|---|---|---|
| Rank insignia | Gymnastjorka |
| Rank insignia | Sleeve chevron |
| Native name | | Ахлагч; Ahlagch | Aхлах турууч Akhlakh Turuuch | Tурууч; Turuuch | Бага турууч Baga turuuch | Байлдагч; Baildagch |
| Translation | | Master sergeant | Senior sergeant | Sergeant | Junior sergeant | Private |

== 1944–1972 ==
=== Officers ===
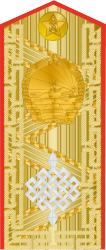
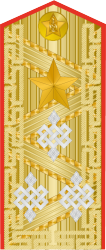
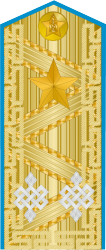
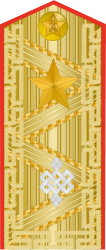
| Rank group | General / flag officers | | | | Senior officers | | | Junior officers |
|---|---|---|---|---|---|---|---|---|---|---|---|
| (Mongolia) Mongolian People's Army |
| (Mongolia) Mongolian People's Army | Маршал; Marshal | Хурандаа генерал Khurandaa gyenyeral | Дэслэгч генерал Deslegch gyenyeral | Хошууч генерал Khoshuuch gyenyeral | Хурандаа; Khurandaa | Дэд хурандаа Ded khurandaa | Хошууч; Khoshuuch | Ахмад; Akhmad | Ахлах дэслэгч Akhlakh deslegch | Дэслэгч; Deslegch | Бага дэслэгч Baga deslegch |
| Translation | Marshal | Colonel general | Lieutenant general | Major general | Colonel | Lieutenant colonel | Major | Captain | Senior lieutenant | Lieutenant | Junior lieutenant |

=== Enlisted ===
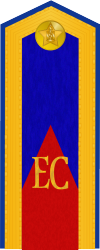
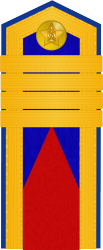
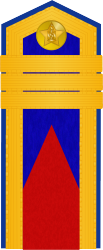
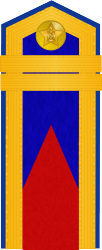
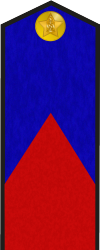
| Rank group | Senior NCOs | | | Junior NCOs | Enlisted |
|---|---|---|---|---|---|---|
| (Mongolia) Mongolian People's Army |
| (Mongolia) Mongolian People's Army | Ахлагч; Ahlagch | Ахлах tïрïïч Akhlakh tïrïïch | Тïрïïч; Tïrïïch | Бага tïрïïч Baga tïrïïch | Ахлах байлдагч Akhlakh baildagch | Байлдагч; Baildagch |
| | Staff sergeant | Sergeant first class | Sergeant | Junior sergeant | Private first class | Private |

== 1972–1992 ==
=== Officers ===
| Rank group | General / flag officers | | | | | Senior officers | | | Junior officers |
|---|---|---|---|---|---|---|---|---|---|---|---|---|
| (Mongolia) Mongolian People's Army |
| (Mongolia) Mongolian People's Army | Маршал; Marshal | Армийн генерал Armiin gyenyeral | Хурандаа генерал Khurandaa gyenyeral | Дэслэгч генерал Deslegch gyenyeral | Хошууч генерал Khoshuuch gyenyeral | Хурандаа; Khurandaa | Дэд хурандаа Ded khurandaa | Хошууч; Khoshuuch | Ахмад; Akhmad | Ахлах дэслэгч Akhlakh deslegch | Дэслэгч; Deslegch | Бага дэслэгч Baga deslegch |
| US equivalent | General of the Army | General | Lieutenant general | Major general | Brigadier general | Colonel | Lieutenant colonel | Major | Captain | First lieutenant | Second lieutenant |

=== Enlisted ===
| Rank group | Senior NCOs | | | Junior NCOs | Enlisted |
|---|---|---|---|---|---|---|
| (Mongolia) Mongolian People's Army |
| (Mongolia) Mongolian People's Army | Ахлагч; Akhlagch | Ахлах Түрүүч; Akhlagch türüüch | Түрүүч; Türüüch | Бага түрүүч Baga türüüch | Ахлах байлдагч Akhlagch baildagch | Байлдагч; Baildagch |
| US equivalent | Sergeant major | Sergeant first class | Staff sergeant | Corporal | Private first class | Private |

== See also ==
- Mongolian military ranks
