= Independent Authority Against Corruption =

Anti-corruption agency of Mongolia

Independent Authority Against Corruption Авлигатай Тэмцэх Газар
- Emblem of the IAAC
- Abbreviation: IAAC (English); АТГ (Mongolian)
- Motto: Шударга ёс, хөгжил дэвшилд (Together for a corruption-free society)

Agency overview
- Formed: 11 January 2007; 19 years ago

Jurisdictional structure
- National agency: Mongolia
- Operations jurisdiction: Mongolia
- Governing body: Government of Mongolia / State Great Khural
- Constituting instrument: Law Against Corruption (2006)
- Specialist jurisdiction: Anti-corruption

Operational structure
- Headquarters: Ulaanbaatar, Mongolia
- Agency executive: Zandraagiin Dashdavaa, General Director

Website
- www.iaac.mn

The Independent Authority Against Corruption (IAAC) (Mongolian: Авлигатай тэмцэх газар, romanized: Avligatai temtsekh gazar) is the special, independent anti-corruption agency of Mongolia. Established in 2007, the IAAC is responsible for running anti-corruption education and prevention programmes; conducting undercover operations, inquiries, and investigations to detect corruption; and inspecting the assets and income declarations of individuals required by law.

== History ==
Prior to the agency's establishment, the Government of Mongolia and the State Great Khural (parliament) adopted and enacted various laws to combat corruption. In 1996, the State Great Khural adopted the first Law Against Corruption. Later in 2002, the National Program Against Corruption was approved, and a non-permanent National Council was established. In 2005, the parliament signed the United Nations Convention Against Corruption on 29 April 2005 and ratified the treaty on 11 January 2006. Efforts for the renewal of the Law Against Corruption was subsequently made.

On 6 July 2006, the new Law Against Corruption, which constituted the anti-graft special agency, was passed by parliament. The law took effect on 1 November 2006. Consequently, the Independent Authority Against Corruption was formally established on 11 January 2007. Baasain Dangaasuren was appointed the first chief of the agency on 28 December 2006. However, he died of suspicious circumstances while on a working visit to Sydney on 25 October 2007.

Since its establishment, the IAAC has evolved as a central law enforcement institution in Mongolia. However, of the total 2207 criminal cases investigated by the IAAC, it was reported in 2018 that only 233 cases had been prosecuted. The investigative powers of the IAAC was curtailed by Prosecutors. Criminal investigations by the IAAC could be stopped by prosecutors at different levels while its submitted cases could be returned or delayed by courts.

== Legal framework ==
According to the Law Against Corruption, the General Director (head) of the IAAC is nominated by the President of Mongolia, which is then approved by parliament. To avoid politicization during national elections held every four year, the agency head serves a six-year-long term.

The three main criterias for the post are:

- Lawyer by profession
- 10 to 15 years of experience in government service
- No political appointments for five years prior to the post

=== Jurisdiction ===
The agency's jurisdiction includes:

- Abuse of power or office by a state official
- Excess of authority by a state official
- Abuse of authority by an official of an NGO or a business entity
- Excess of authority by an official of an NGO or a business entity
- Receiving of a bribe
- Giving of a bribe or intermediation in bribery
- Spending of the budget funds contrary to their designation

The IAAC works independently of the government and isn't affiliated to any ministries, agencies, or institutions. According to its constituting law, the agency's form, structure, and dissolution is decided by the State Great Khural with consultation of the National Security Council.

== General directors ==
- Baasain Dangaasuren (28 December 2006 – 25 October 2007)
- Chimgeegiin Sangaragchaa (28 December 2008 – 22 March 2011)
- Navaansurengiin Ganbold (17 November 2011 – 14 April 2016)
- Khurelsukhiin Enkhjargal (8 July 2016 – 2 May 2019)
- Zandraagiin Dashdavaa (2 May 2019 – present)

== See also ==
- Corruption in Mongolia
- Law enforcement in Mongolia
