= Gelegdorjiin Demid =

Mongolian marshal and politician (1900–1937)

- Гэлэгдоржийн Дэмид
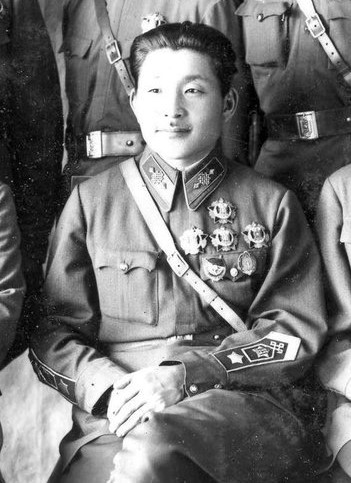

Minister of Military Affairs of People's Republic of Mongolia
- In office 1930 – 22 August 1937
- Leader: Anandyn Amar (as Chairman of the Presidium of the State Little Hural)
- Preceded by: Khorloogiin Choibalsan
- Succeeded by: Khorloogiin Choibalsan

Personal details
- Born: 1900 Ikh-Tamir, Arkhangai Province, Outer Mongolia, Qing China
- Died: 22 August 1937 (aged 36–37) Tayga, Novosibirsk, Russian SFSR, Soviet Union
- Party: Mongolian People's Revolutionary Party (1921–1937)

Military service
- Allegiance: Mongolian People's Republic
- Branch/service: Mongolian People's Army
- Years of service: 1921–1937
- Rank: Marshal of the Mongolian People's Republic

Gelegdorjiin Demid (Mongolian: Гэлэгдоржийн Дэмид; 1900 – August 22, 1937) was a prominent political and military figure in 1920s and 1930s Mongolia who served as minister of war and Marshal of the Mongolian People's Republic (general chief commander) of the Mongolian armed forces. His death under suspicious circumstances in 1937 allowed his rival Khorloogiin Choibalsan to consolidate power and subsequently launch the Great Terror during which 30,000 to 35,000 Mongolians died.

== Career ==
Demid was born in 1900 in present-day Ikh-Tamir, Arkhangai Province. In 1921 he joined the Mongolian People's Party and fought as a partisan during the Mongolian Revolution of 1921. After the revolution, Demid served in the Mongolian military and taught at Mongolia's Military Academy. From 1926 to 1929 he studied at the Red Army Cavalry School in Tver, returning to Mongolia in 1929 to take command of the Military Academy.

In 1930 he was elected as member of the Presidium (or Politburo) of the Central Committee of the Mongolian People's Revolutionary Party and named army commander-in-chief. By the time the government adopted the New Turn policy in 1932, Demid had become one of Mongolia's most important and influential leaders.

Through the 1930s he held several important political and military posts including president of the military council, minister of war, and second deputy chairman of the council of ministers. Demid was a strong proponent of technological modernization of Mongolia's military and under his command the military substantially increased its stock of automobiles, trucks, planes and modern weapons. Demid was also known to be wary of the military's excessive reliance on Soviet advisers but later advocated the stationing of Soviet troops in Mongolia in 1935. In 1936 Choibalsan and Demid were appointed Marshals of the Armed Forces.

== Death and rehabilitation ==
Demid died at Tayga railway station (in northeastern Novosibirsk) on August 22, 1937, while on board the Trans-Siberian Railway en route to Moscow. His death, at the age of 37, was officially attributed to food poisoning but the timing and circumstances remain suspicious.

Choibalsan, tapped by Joseph Stalin and the NKVD to be the next leader of the Mongolian People's Republic, had always resented Demid's popularity. The death of his rival cleared the way for Choibalsan to accede to the dual role of sole Commander-in-Chief of the Mongolian military and minister of war, in addition to being minister of interior.

The day after Demid's burial, on September 3, 1937, Choibalsan issued Order 366, which declared that many in Mongolia “had fallen under the influence of Japanese spies and provocateurs.” A few days later Demid himself was posthumously declared the head of a counter-revolutionary organization and a Japanese spy. Demid's widow Navch, his two brothers, and his father were arrested.

By the end of August, Stalin had ordered the stationing of 30,000 Red Army troops in Mongolia to counter Japanese military movements in Manchuria. Stalin also dispatched Soviet Deputy NKVD Commissar Mikhail Frinovsky to Ulaanbaatar to launch sweeping and violent purges against Buddhist clergy, intelligentsia, political dissidents, ethnic Buryats and Khazaks, and other "enemies of the revolution", similar to the purges he had so effectively managed in the Soviet Union under NKVD Chief Nikolai Yezhov.

Demid was rehabilitated in June 1962 and posthumously restored as a member of the MPRP.
