= Bugyn Dejid =

Mongolian politician and army figure (born 1927)

Bugyn Dejid Бугын Дэжид

Minister of Public Security of the Mongolian People's Republic
- In office 1971–1981
- Preceded by: Badrakhyn Jambalsuren
- Succeeded by: Ulziihutagtiin Choijilsuren

Personal details
- Born: 1927
- Party: Mongolian People's Party
- Education: Mongolian State University

Bugyn Dejid (Mongolian: Бугын Дэжид; born 1927) was a Mongolian politician and military figure who served as Minister of Public Security of the Mongolian People's Republic from 1971 to 1981.

== Biography ==
Bugyn Dejid studied at the Mongolian State University between 1952 and 1957 and was then Vice-Chairman of the Executive Committee of the People's Khural of the Govi-Altai Province from 1957 to 1960 and then Vice-Chairman of the Executive Committee of the People's Khural of the Töv Province, the central province of the Mongolian People's Republic, between 1960 and 1963. After serving as First Secretary of the MRVP Provincial Committee of the Töv Province from 1963 to 1966, he served as First Secretary of the Mongolian People's Party Provincial Committee of the Bayan-Ölgii Province between 1966 and 1970. He also became a member of the Central Committee of the Mongolian People's Party at the 15th Party Congress in 1966.

Bugyn Dejid then served as First Deputy Minister of Public Security from 1970 to 1971 and then as Lieutenant General between 1971 and 1981 as Minister of Public Security. He was finally promoted to Colonel General and was also a deputy of the Great People's Khural, the parliament of the Mongolian People's Republic. At the 18th Party Congress in 1981, he was also a candidate for the Politburo of the Central Committee and also served as chairman of the Party Control Commission between 1981 and 1986. At the 7th Plenum of the Central Committee on 6 December 1983, he was appointed as the successor to Sampilyn Jalan-Aajav who had been relieved of all his functions, as a member of the Politburo of the Central Committee, of which he remained until March 1990. In addition, after the 19th Party Congress, he was Secretary of the Central Committee of the Mongolian People's Party from 1986 to March 1990. In this capacity, he also took part in the Fourteenth Party Congress of the Romanian Communist Party (20 to 24 November 1989) and was received by General Secretary Nicolae Ceaușescu. After his loss of power, he was expelled from the party shortly afterwards for "gross violation of party discipline and the reputation of the party".
