= Bayandelger, Sükhbaatar =

District in Sükhbaatar Province, Mongolia

Bayandelger District Баяндэлгэр сум ᠪᠶ᠋ᠠᠨᠳᠡᠯᠭᠡᠷᠰᠤᠮᠤ
- District
- Location in Mongolia
- Coordinates: 45°43′39″N 112°21′25″E
- Country: Mongolia
- Elevation: 1,110 m (3,640 ft)

Population (2009)
  - Total: 4,569
- Time zone: UTC+8

Bayandelger (Mongolian: Баяндэлгэр, Rich expanse) is a sum (district) of Sükhbaatar Province in eastern Mongolia. The population (as of 2009) of the sum is 4,569, including 1,169 in the sum center.

== Climate ==
Bayandelger has a cold semi-arid climate (Köppen climate classification BSk) with warm summers and very cold winters. Most precipitation falls in the summer as rain. Winters are very dry.

Climate data for Bayandelger, elevation 1,101 m (3,612 ft), (1991–2020 normals, extremes 1956–present)
Month	Jan	Feb	Mar	Apr	May	Jun	Jul	Aug	Sep	Oct	Nov	Dec	Year
Record high °C (°F)	2.2 (36.0)	10.9 (51.6)	22.5 (72.5)	29.0 (84.2)	36.0 (96.8)	37.5 (99.5)	39.4 (102.9)	39.4 (102.9)	35.2 (95.4)	30.5 (86.9)	15.1 (59.2)	4.4 (39.9)	39.4 (102.9)
Mean daily maximum °C (°F)	−13.3 (8.1)	−8.1 (17.4)	2.9 (37.2)	12.6 (54.7)	20.2 (68.4)	25.8 (78.4)	28.6 (83.5)	26.9 (80.4)	20.1 (68.2)	10.2 (50.4)	−2.0 (28.4)	−11.9 (10.6)	9.3 (48.8)
Daily mean °C (°F)	−18.5 (−1.3)	−14.2 (6.4)	−4.3 (24.3)	5.4 (41.7)	12.9 (55.2)	19.3 (66.7)	22.2 (72.0)	20.2 (68.4)	13.5 (56.3)	3.8 (38.8)	−7.9 (17.8)	−16.8 (1.8)	3.0 (37.3)
Mean daily minimum °C (°F)	−22.9 (−9.2)	−19.3 (−2.7)	−10.1 (13.8)	−1.1 (30.0)	6.0 (42.8)	13.1 (55.6)	16.2 (61.2)	14.0 (57.2)	7.3 (45.1)	−1.9 (28.6)	−12.6 (9.3)	−21.0 (−5.8)	−2.7 (27.2)
Record low °C (°F)	−37.8 (−36.0)	−35.0 (−31.0)	−33.9 (−29.0)	−21.1 (−6.0)	−8.0 (17.6)	0.0 (32.0)	1.1 (34.0)	1.3 (34.3)	−6.4 (20.5)	−21.0 (−5.8)	−30.5 (−22.9)	−37.8 (−36.0)	−37.8 (−36.0)
Average precipitation mm (inches)	0.8 (0.03)	1.2 (0.05)	2.9 (0.11)	7.9 (0.31)	24.4 (0.96)	34.1 (1.34)	44.9 (1.77)	27.8 (1.09)	19.6 (0.77)	6.9 (0.27)	3.8 (0.15)	1.9 (0.07)	176.2 (6.92)
Average precipitation days (≥ 1.0 mm)	0.2	0.5	1.0	1.7	3.7	4.8	6.7	4.6	3.1	1.6	1.0	0.7	29.6
Source 1: NOAA Starlings Roost Weather
Source 2: Meteo Climat (record highs and lows)

== Administrative divisions ==
The district is divided into six bags, which are:

- Bayan
- Delger
- Dukhum
- Khongor
- Shireet
- Tuv

== Notable natives ==
- Sanjiin Bataa, Minister of Defense (1952–1956)
