= National Security Council of Mongolia =

Consultative body of the Mongolian president

- Монгол Улсын Үндэсний аюулгүй байдлын зөвлөл
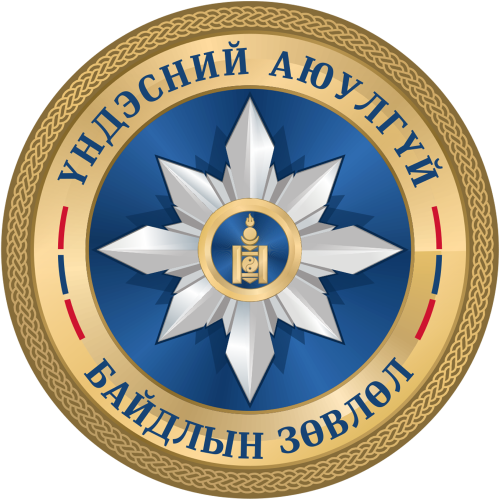
- Emblem of the National Security Council

Council overview
- Formed: 13 January 1992; 34 years ago
- Jurisdiction: Mongolia
- Headquarters: Government Palace, Ulaanbaatar
- Council executives: Sandagiin Byambatsogt, Acting President (chair); Sandagiin Byambatsogt, Chairman of State Great Khural (member); Nyam-Osoryn Uchral, Prime Minister (member)
- Website: nsc.gov.mn

The National Security Council of Mongolia (NSC; Mongolian: ҮАБЗ, Монгол Улсын Үндэсний аюулгүй байдлын зөвлөл, romanized: Mongol Ulsyn Ündesnii ayulgui baidlyn zövlöl) is a consultative body to the Office of the President of Mongolia. It focuses mainly on briefing high-ranking national security and/or political figures on the state of internal and external threats in Mongolia. It also advises the President in his/her orders to the Mongolian Armed Forces under the Ministry of Defense and the National Police Agency under the Ministry of Justice and Internal Affairs. The NSC is affiliated with the larger Security and Foreign Policy Council (established in April 2010) and the Information and Analytical Council, the latter of which is composed of former politicians, military leaders, diplomats, and academics and intellectual experts.

Besides executive leadership of the council by the President as chairman, the post of Secretary of the NSC advises the president in relation to the main missions of the NSC and coordinates work on preparatory decisions and discussions for the council.

== History, status, and role ==
An article in the newly introduced Constitution of Mongolia (adopted on 13 January 1992) stated that the President will be the chairman of the National Security Council. On 29 May, the State Great Khural established the NSC by adopting the National Security Council Law. This law defined the principles, powers, and functions of the NSC. It held its first meeting in August of that year under the chairmanship of President Punsalmaagiin Ochirbat , and later in July, saw the appointment of Jargalsaikhany Enkhsaikhan as secretary. In 1994, the National Security Concept was established to charter the conditions and situations that the security of Mongolia is in. Over the years, the concept has been renewed multiple times, more recently in July 2010.

In March 2019, the NSC became involved in a national constitutional crisis when the State Great Khural adopted an unprecedented law on the proposal of President Khaltmaagiin Battulga on the 27th of that month, which effectively gave the NSC the power to recommend the firing of judges, prosecutors, and the leaders in the Anti-Corruption Agency. The opposition Democratic Party , as well as some dissenting voices in the ruling Mongolian People's Party criticized the law as an attempt to seize state power and undermine democracy, while lawyers and former MPs protested by affirming that it is not a constitutional body.

== Composition ==
The NSC is composed of the following permanent members:

- President of Mongolia (chairman)
- Prime Minister of Mongolia
- Chairman of the State Great Khural

The following officials shall attend an NSC meeting with advisory rights:

- Vice Speaker of the State Great Khural
- Chairperson of the Standing Committee on Security and Foreign Policy of the State Great Khural
- Floor leaders of the State Great Khural
- Head of General Intelligence Agency

Cabinet ministers and Chief of the General Staff also give presentations to the NSC. The Executive Office of the NSC supports the NSC's members in fulfilling their duties and organizes joint-government institutions in implementing national security policy.

== Secretaries of the NSC ==
- Ravdangiin Bataa (1992–1993)
- Jargalsaikhany Enhsaikhan (1993–1996)
- Choisürengiin Baatar (1996–1997)
- Ravdangiin Bold (1997–2003)
- Dugerjavyn Gotov (2003–2006)
- Palamyn Sündev (2006–2008)
- Manibadrakhyn Ganbold (2008–2009)
- Tsagaandariin Enkhtüvshin (2009–3 November 2017)
- Amarjargalyn Gansükh (3 November 2017 – 25 June 2021)
- Jadambyn Enkhbayar (25 June 2021 – 28 December 2023)
- Altangereliin Byambajargal (since 28 December 2023)

== See also ==
- National security council
- Government of Mongolia
- Bat Khurts
