= Batyn Dorj =

Mongolian statesman and military leader

General of the Army Hero of the Mongolian People's Republic Batyn Dorj
- Батын Дорж

Minister of Defense of the Mongolian People's Republic
- In office July 1969 – 1978
- Leader: Yumjaagiin Tsedenbal
- Preceded by: Zhamyangiyn Lhagvasuren
- Succeeded by: Jarantyn Avkhia

Personal details
- Born: 17 September 1914 Aldarkhaan, Zavkhan, Bogd Khanate of Mongolia
- Died: 23 July 1982 (aged 67) Ulaanbaatar, Mongolian People's Republic
- Citizenship: Mongolian People's Republic
- Party: Mongolian People's Party
- Profession: Soldier

Military service
- Allegiance: Mongolian People's Republic
- Branch/service: Mongolian People's Army
- Years of service: 1935–1982
- Rank: General of the Army

General of the Army Batyn Dorj (Mongolian: Батын Дорж; 17 September 1914 — 23 July 1982) was a Mongolian statesman and military leader in the Mongolian People's Republic. He was one of the first 11 generals in Mongolia. Dorj is regarded as one of the most influential and consequential Mongolian government, military and social figures of the twentieth century.

== Biography ==
He was born in Mongolia in the Barzan area on the territory of the Aldarkhaan, in what was then the Bogd Khanate. The early 30s, he worked as a firefighter and collective farmer. From 1935 to 1936, he studied at the cavalry school under the 1st Cavalry Division and in 1937, he joined the Mongolian People's Revolutionary Party. During World War Two, he participated in the Battles of Khalkhin Gol, serving as head of the Ulaanbaatar Garrison as well. Until 1940, he held various positions from platoon commander to commander of the 7th Cavalry Division on the western border, guarding the Aimags of mongolia from the troops of the Republic of China and Ospan Batyr's Armies.

From 1940 to 1948, he was Deputy Minister of Internal Affairs of the MPR, serving as Head of the Directorate of Border and Internal Troops. After graduating from the Frunze Military Academy in 1952, he was appointed commander of a separate cavalry brigade. In 1956, he was made the Minister of Military and Public Security, and then from 1959 to 1961, the Minister of Public Security. For most of the 1960s, he was in diplomatic work, consistently holding the posts of Ambassador to North Korea (1961–1963), East Germany (1963–1966), and Yugoslavia (1966–1968). During this period, he also had close relations with the leadership of Bulgaria and Poland. In July 1969, he became Minister of Defense of the Mongolian People's Republic. The following year, he graduated and attended courses at the Military Academy of the General Staff. In 1971, on the occasion of the 50th anniversary of the People's Revolution, he became the first officer to hold the rank of general of the army in the republic. During this period he was elected six times to the Great People's Khural and served on the Central Committee of the MPRP.

He was dismissed in 1978, and from then on until his death he was the Chairman of the Committee of Honored Revolutionary Figures of the All-Russian State Art Academy.

== Awards ==
=== MPR ===
- Hero of the Mongolian People's Republic (1974)
- Order of Sukhbaatar
- Order of the Red Banner of Merit
- Order of the Red Banner of Labor
- Order of the Polar Star

=== Foreign countries ===
- (Soviet Union) Order of Lenin
- (Soviet Union) Order of the Red Banner
- (Soviet Union) Order of the Patriotic War
- Order of the Red Banner (People's Republic of Bulgaria)
- (Socialist Federal Republic of Yugoslavia) Order of the Red Banner (Yugoslavia)
- Order of the Red Banner (North Korea)

=== Ranks ===
- Major general (1944
- Lieutenant general (1956)
- Colonel general (1969)
- General of the army (1971)

== Legacy ==
In 1982, the 0130th Frontier Post of the Mongolian Border Guard was named after him. Monuments to Dorj are located in his native Aldarkhaan as well as in the Khovd Province. On his 100th anniversary in 2012, efforts were launched to release memoirs and create research books in his honor.
