= Order of the Red Banner (People's Republic of Bulgaria) =

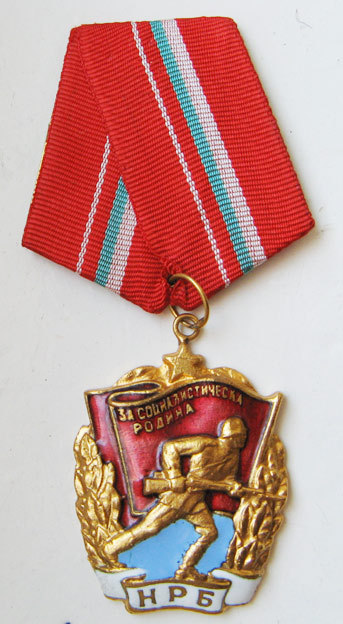
- Type: single-grade order
- Awarded for: Heroism in combat
- Presented by: People's Republic of Bulgaria
- Eligibility: Bulgarian and foreign citizens, military units and formations, military schools, and institutions
- Status: No longer awarded
- Established: 13 December 1950
- First award: March 10, 1951
- Final award: 5 April 1991
- Ribbon of the award
- Related: Order of the Red Banner (Soviet)

The Order of the Red Banner (Bulgarian: Орден Червено знаме) was a military decoration of the People's Republic of Bulgaria. The medal had been awarded to Bulgarian and foreign military personnel as well as institutions for services to the state. There are two variations of this award, originally one which is numbered and then issued later, one which is unnumbered. It was designed by O. Odabashyan.

== History ==
The Order of the Red Banner of Labor was established on 13 December 1950 and was awarded to Bulgarian and Warsaw Pact military personnel for distinction in battle or for merit in the strengthening of power and structure of the Bulgarian People's Army. The first holder of the order was Senior Lieutenant N. Ivanov on March 10, 1951. It had five variations before its discontinuation on 5 April 1991 alongside other awards such as the Order of Georgi Dimitrov.

== Recipients ==
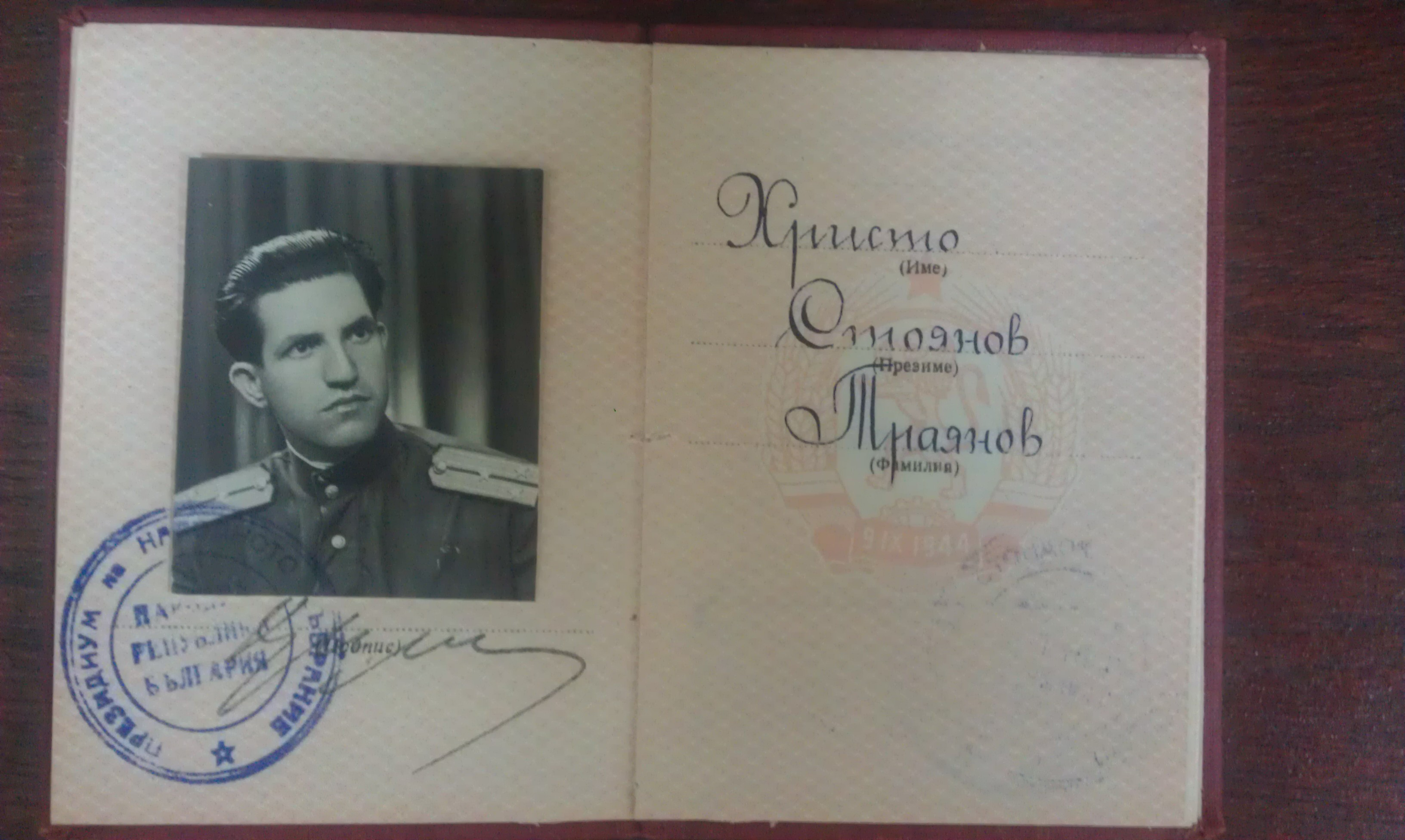
Hristo Trayanov's Order of the Red Banner document.

=== Bulgarian ===
- Valko Chervenkov
- Asen Karastoyanov
- Hristo Trayanov, writer

=== Foreign ===
- Batyn Dorj
- Magomed Tankayev
- Mikhail Moiseyev
- Nikolai Skomorokhov
- Vladimir Ivanov (January 22, 1985)
