= General Intelligence Agency of Mongolia =

Intelligence agency of Mongolia

- Тагнуулын ерөнхий газар ᠮᠣᠩᠭᠤᠯ ᠤᠯᠤᠰ ᠤ᠋ᠨ ᠲᠠᠩᠨᠠᠭᠤᠯ ᠤ᠋ᠨ ᠶᠡᠷᠦᠩᢈᠡᠢ ᠭᠠᠵᠠᠷ
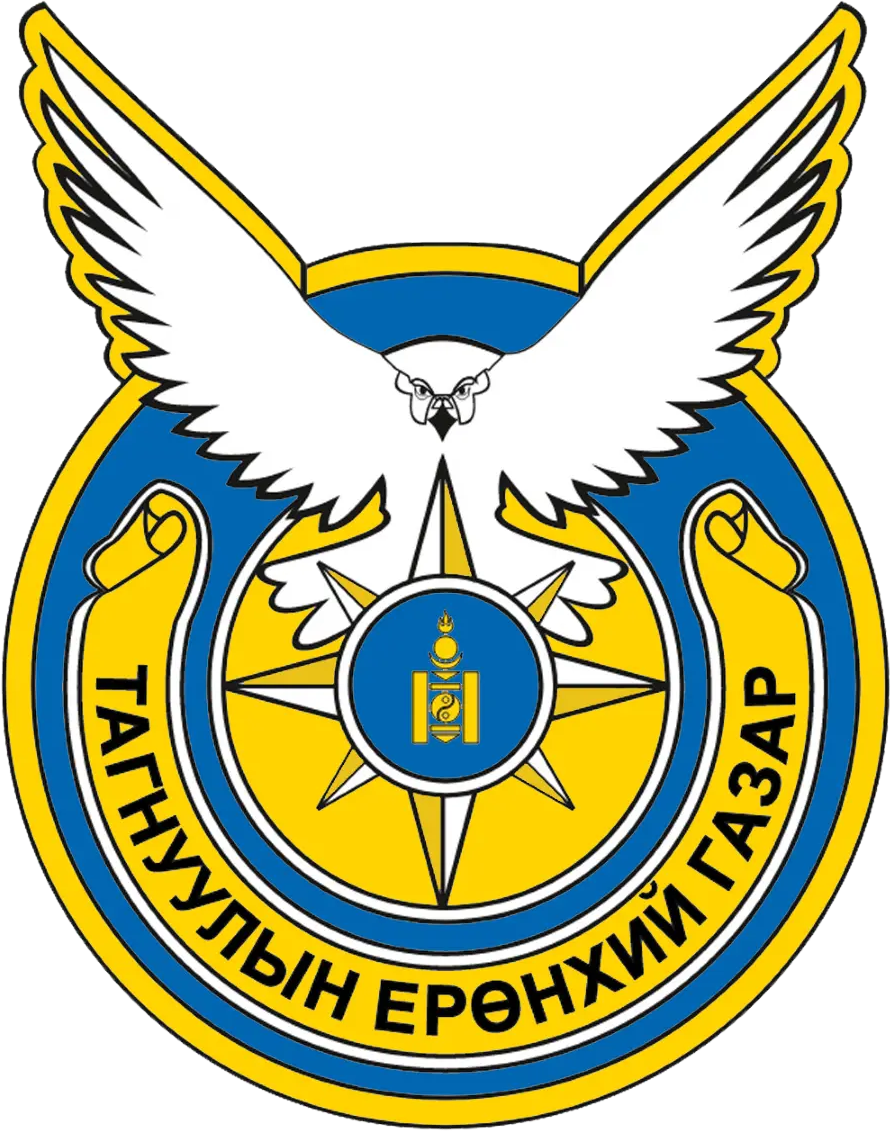
- Seal of the General Intelligence Agency

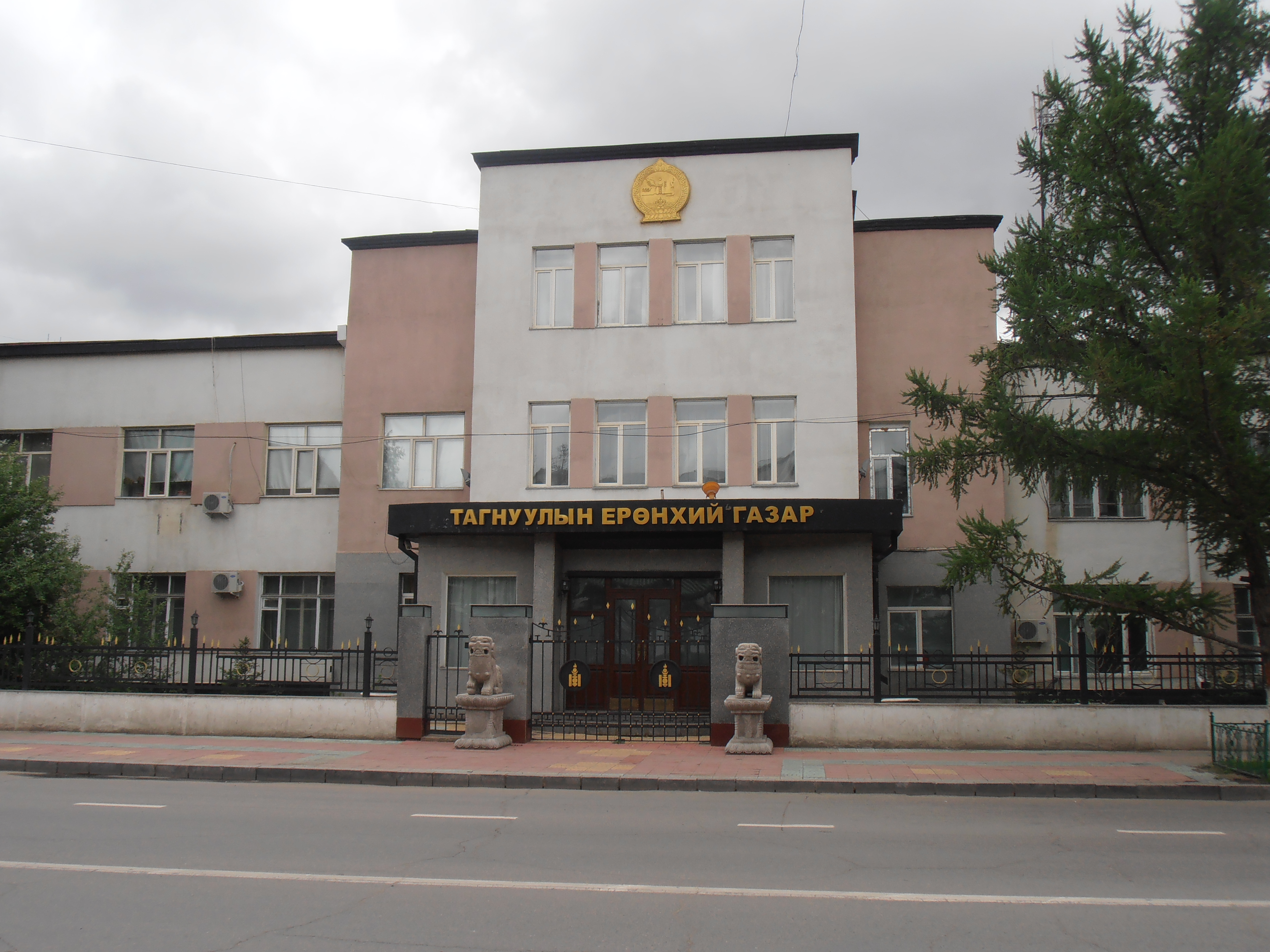
- Headquarters of the GIA in Ulaanbaatar

Agency overview
- Formed: July 3, 1922; 104 years ago
- Preceding agency: Directorate of State Security
- Jurisdiction: Government of Mongolia
- Headquarters: Ulaanbaatar
- Agency executive: Peljee Odonbaatar, GIA Director
- Website: Official website

The General Intelligence Agency or General Intelligence Directorate (GIA; Mongolian: ТЕГ, Тагнуулын ерөнхий газар, romanized: Tagnuulyn yurönkhii gazar) is the intelligence agency of the Government of Mongolia, under the direct control of the Prime Minister of Mongolia. Its headquarters is in the Mongolian capital of Ulaanbaatar. The GIA employs several hundred people and acts as an early warning system to alert the Mongolian government of national security threats. It collects and evaluates information on a variety of areas such as international terrorism, organized crime, weapons and drug trafficking, money laundering, illegal migration, and information warfare.

Founded in 1922 with Soviet assistance, Mongolian intelligence performed well against both Imperial Japanese and Republican Chinese services during the 1930s and 1940s, while providing assistance to Soviet forces and Chinese Communists. Later, after the Sino-Soviet split and the Cultural revolution in the 1960s and 1970s, Mongolian intelligence confronted Mao's intelligence agencies in close collaboration with the Soviet KGB.

== History ==
The General Intelligence Agency began as the Directorate of Internal Security (Mongolian: Дотоодыг хамгаалах газар, romanized: Dotoodyg khamgaalakh gazar), which was established on 3 July 1922 under the leadership of director Dashin Baldandorzh with 14 employees for counterintelligence operations. Despite the name "Internal Security", a "Foreign Department" was established within the Directorate in 1926, that sent agents to both China and Japan to gather intelligence, under Soviet tutelage.

In 1933, it was reorganized as the General Directorate of Internal Security, and in 1936 as the General Directorate of State Security under the Ministry of the Interior, later the Ministry of Public Security of the Mongolian People's Republic (Mongolian: БНМАУ-ын Нийгмийг аюулаас хамгаалах яам). The Ministry of Public Security was a catalyst for the republic's paramilitary forces, which totaled around 30,000 men by 1955. The GIA was founded as a successor to the State Security Directorate after the abolition of the socialist state in 1992.

== Naming lineage ==
- Directorate of Internal Security (1922-1933)
- General Directorate of Internal Security (1933-1936)
- General Directorate of State Security under the Ministry of the Interior (1936-1956)
- General Directorate of State Security under the Ministry of Military Affairs and Public Security (1956-1959)
- Directorate of State Security under the Ministry of Public Security (1959-1990)
- General Department of State Security (1990-1994)
- Central Intelligence Agency (1994-1996)
- Department of State Security (1996-2000)
- General Intelligence Agency (since 2000)

== List of directors ==
- Dashin Baldandorzh (1922–1923)
- Konstantin Batorun (1923–1925)
- Nasanbat Navaandorzhiyn (1925–1926)
- Khayanhirva Namzhilin (1926–1928)
- Zolbinginy Shizhe (1928–1930)
- Bat-Ochiryn Eldev-Ochir (1930–1932)
- Davaagine Namsrai (1932–1936)
- Khorloogiin Choibalsan (1936–1940)
- Puravyn Dambadarzh (1940–1941)
- Bat Ochirin Shagdarzhav (1941–1946)
- Dashin Tsedev (1946–1949)
- Butamgein Duinharzhav (1949–1951)
- Damdinnerangiin Bath (1951–1952)
- Tsedengiin Janchiv (1952–1956)
- Batyn Dorj (1956–1961)
- Tsevegiin Nansaljav (1961-1962)
- Budiin Banzaragch (1962-1963)
- Badrakhyn Jambalsuren (1963-1971)
- Bugyn Dejid (1971-1981)
- Ulziihutagtiin Choijilsuren (1981-1982)
- Sonomyn Luvsangombo (1982-1984)
- Agvaanjantsan Jamsranjav (1984-1990)
- Battsagaanii Tsiiregzen (1990.04.19-1990.10.19)
- Jaalkhuugiin Baatar (1990-1993), (1996.09.02-1996.12.05)
- Dalkhjavyn Sandag (1993-1996)
- Jamsrangiin Enkhnasan (1996-2001)
- Mandaakhuugiin Batsaikhan (2001-2004)
- B. Bilegt (until 2006)
- Navaansurengin Gunbold (2006–2007)
- Ravdangiin Bold (2007–2012)
- D. Gerel (2012–2013)
- B. Ariunsan (2013–2014)
- Bat Khurts (2014–2017)
- D. Gerel (since 2017-2020)
- Peljee Odonbaatar (2020-present)

== The activities of intelligence agencies are regulated by the following laws of Mongolia ==
1. About intelligence agencies
2. About the work to be done
3. About national security
4. Criminal Law
5. Criminal procedure
6. About fighting terrorism
7. Combating Money Laundering and Terrorist Financing
8. About state secrets
9. On approval of the list of state secrets
10. On the legal status of government agencies
11. About special state protection
12. About civil service
13. About state inspection
14. Controlling the circulation of explosives and explosives
15. General Administrative Law
16. On administrative proceedings
17. About the armed forces
18. About pensions and allowances of military personnel
19. About the legal status of foreign citizens
20. About firearms
21. Protection of witnesses and victims
22. About crime prevention
23. About psychic energy
24. About the Prosecutor's Office
25. About emergency
26. Controlling the circulation of narcotic drugs and psychoactive substances
27. Defense of Mongolia
28. About the archive
29. Against corruption
30. About the border crisis
31. About toxic and dangerous chemicals
32. Regulation of public and private interests in public service and prevention of conflict of interest
33. On solving petitions and complaints submitted by citizens to government organizations and officials
