= Marshal of the Mongolian People's Republic =

Marshal of the Mongolian People's Republic Бүгд Найрамдах Монгол Ард Улсын маршал
- Collar strap (1936–1944)
- Country: Mongolian People's Republic
- Service branch: Mongolian People's Army
- Rank: General officer
- Formation: 21 February 1936
- Abolished: 12 February 1992
- Next higher rank: None
- Next lower rank: General

The Marshal of the Mongolian People's Republic (Mongolian: Бүгд Найрамдах Монгол Ард Улсын маршал, romanized: Bügd Nairamdakh Mongol Ard Ulsyn marshal) was the highest rank in the Mongolian People's Army of the Mongolian People's Republic.

== History ==
The position was established in 1936 after Khorloogiin Choibalsan and Gelegdorjiin Demid were awarded the title of Marshal by the Presidium of the Little Khural and Council of People's Commisars on 21 February 1936. However, Marshal Demid died of "food poisoning" while en route to Moscow via the Trans-Siberian Railway on 22 August 1937.

Military uniform of the Marshal (1936–1944)

Following Demid's death, Marshal Choibalsan, who became Internal Affairs minister in 1937, orchestrated the Great Repression and alleged Demid was the head of a counter-revolutionary organization. The purges claimed the lives of around 25,000 to 30,000 people and ended after Choibalsan's ascension to premiership (Chairman of the People's Commisars) in March 1939. Choibalsan held the rank of Marshal and absolute power until his death in January 1952. He was succeeded by General Secretary of the Central Committee and vice premier Yumjaagiin Tsedenbal, who served as an officer in the army since 1934. Tsedenbal consolidated his power by "soft purge" of his opponents in the late 1950s and 1960s.

Between 1952 and 1979, no one actively served as the marshal of the Armed Forces. Tsedenbal promoted himself to army general, the highest rank in the Mongolian People's Army. On 14 August 1979, he was promoted as marshal by the Presidium of the People's Great Khural, which he chaired. At the age of 68, while abroad, he was ousted from power by party cadres in August 1984, with the support of the Soviet Union. At the height of the 1990 Democratic Revolution, the reshuffled Central Committee of the MPRP criticized Tsedenbal's legacy, stripped him of his titles, and expelled him from the party "for not fulfilling his lofty responsibilities" in April 1990. Tsedenbal passed away in exile on 21 April 1991. The rank of Marshal was abolished when the Mongolian People's Republic was dissolved on 12 February 1992, the day the Constitution of Mongolia came into effect.

== Insignia ==
Rank insignia

Collar insignia
(1936–1944)

Sleeve chevron
(1936–1944)

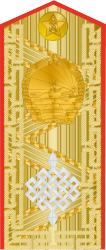
Shoulder insignia
(1944–1972)

Shoulder insignia
(1972–1992)

Ceremonial uniform of the Marshal, worn by Khorloogiin Choibalsan, displayed at the National Museum of Mongolia.

== List of Marshals of the Mongolian People's Republic ==
Portrait	Name	Date of promotion	Defence branch	Ref.
Khorloogiin Choibalsan	Khorloogiin Choibalsan (1895–1952)	21 February 1936	Mongolian People's Army	
Gelegdorjiin Demid	Gelegdorjiin Demid (1900–1937)	21 February 1936	Mongolian People's Army	.
Yumjaagiin Tsedenbal	Yumjaagiin Tsedenbal (1916–1991)	14 August 1979	Mongolian People's Army	.

== See also ==
- Marshal of the Soviet Union
