= Mongolian People's Army =

1921–1992 armed forces of Mongolia

- Монголын Ардын Арми
- Emblem of Mongolian People's Army
- Founded: 13 March 1921
- Disbanded: 12 February 1992
- Service branches: Ground Force; Air Force
- Headquarters: Ulaanbaatar

Leadership
- Commander-in-Chief: Damdin Sükhbaatar (1921–1923); Jambyn Batmönkh (1984–1990)
- Minister of Defence: Damdin Sükhbaatar (1921–1923); Shagalyn Jadambaa (1990–1992)
- Chief of General Staff: General Shagalyn Jadambaa (1990)

Personnel
- Military age: 18
- Conscription: Yes
- Reserve personnel: 15,000

Industry
- Foreign suppliers: Soviet Union; Poland; East Germany; Vietnam; Democratic People's Republic of Korea; Cuba; Bulgaria; China

Related articles
- History: People's Revolution; Uprising in Western Mongolia; Soviet–Japanese border conflicts: Battle of Khalkhin Gol; World War II: Manchurian Strategic Offensive Operation; Aftermath of World War II: Battle of Baitag Bogd
- Ranks: Military ranks of the Mongolian People's Republic

The Mongolian People's Army (Mongolian: Монголын Ардын Арми, romanized: Mongolyn Ardyn armi, Mongolian pronunciation: [mɔŋɡ(ə)ɮɨŋ ɑrdɨŋ armi]), also known as the Mongolian People's Revolutionary Army (Mongolian: Монгол Ардын Хувьсгалт Цэрэг), was an institution of the Mongolian People's Revolutionary Party constituting as the armed forces of the Mongolian People's Republic.

It was established in March 1921 as a secondary army under Soviet Red Army command during the 1920s and during World War II. In 1992, the army's structure changed and then reorganized and renamed as the Mongolian Armed Forces following the dissolution of the Mongolian People's Republic.

== Etymology ==
The armed forces of the Mongolian People's Republic went by several names throughout its existence.

- People's Militia (Note: Mongolian: Ардын журамт цэрэг, romanized: Ardyn juramt tsereg, lit. 'People's Militia') (1921–1925)
- Mongolian People's Revolutionary Army (Note: Mongolian: Монгол ардын хувьсгалт цэрэг, romanized: Mongol ardyn khuvisgalt tsereg, lit. 'Mongolian People's Revolutionary Army/Troops') (1925–1955)
- People's Troops or People's Army (Note: Mongolian: Ардын цэрэг, romanized: Ardyn tsereg, lit. 'People's Army/Troops') (1955–1971)
- Mongolian People's Army (Note: Mongolian: Монголын Ардын Арми, romanized: Mongolyn Ardyn Armi, lit. 'Mongolian People's Army') (1971–1992)

== History ==
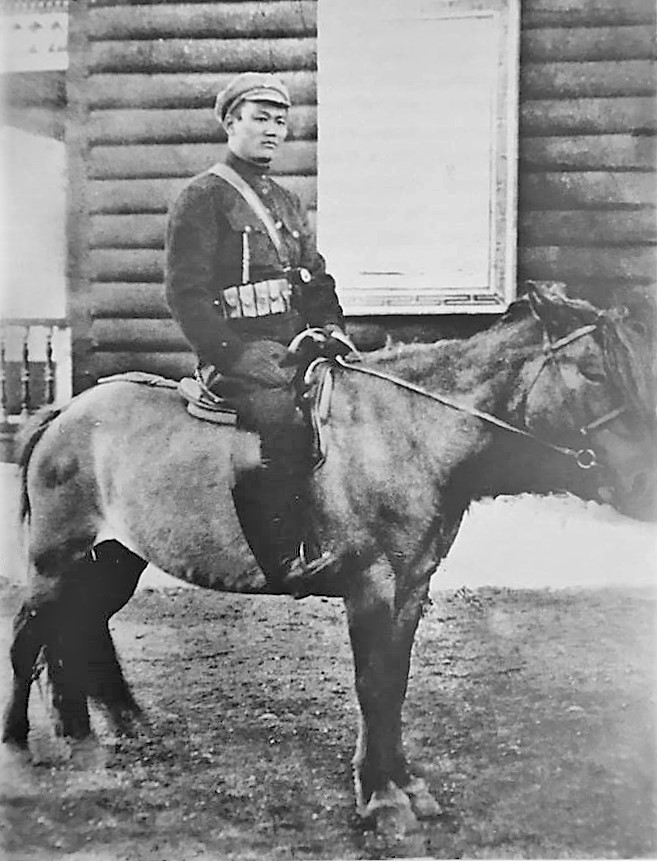
Damdin Sükhbaatar (pictured), one of the founders of Mongolian People's Army

=== Formation ===
One of the first actions of the Mongolian People's Party, established in 1920, was the creation of a native communist army under the leadership of adept cavalry commander Damdin Sükhbaatar in order to fight against Russian troops from the White movement and remaining Chinese forces. The decision to create the People's Militia, the military force of the People's Provisional Government, was made on 9 February 1921.

On 13 March 1921, four cavalry regiments were formed from partisan detachments. The newly formed People's Militia was aided by the Red Army of the Russian SFSR, which helped to expel White Russian and Beiyang troops from the country. Mongolian forces liberated Kyakhta from Chinese garrisons in March 1921 and reached Niislel Khuree (capital) in July 1921. Remaining White forces were defeated in January 1922. Following the 1921 revolution, the Mongolian People's Republic (MPR) was proclaimed in 1924. A Military Council was formed soon after among the military leadership, while the General Staff was led by Soviet specialists.

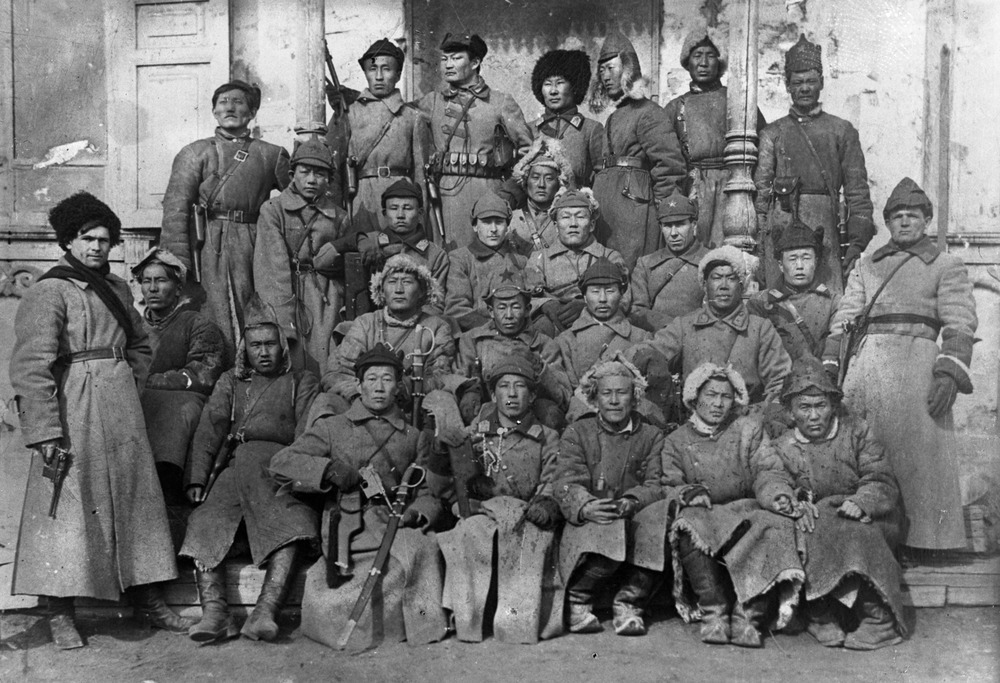
Soldiers of the Mongolian People's Revolutionary Army with Soviet commanders in the late 1920s.

In September 1923, on the outskirts of Urga, the first cavalry school and an artillery school were opened, and a year later, the publication of the army newspaper began. On October 16, 1925, Mongolia adopted a law on universal conscription, and in 1926, the creation of temporary detachments of the people's militia began.

=== 1930s conflicts and WWII ===
The first general banner of the People's Army, presented to the army on 21 January 1925.

Initially during the native revolts of the early 1930s and the Japanese border probes beginning in the mid-1930s, Soviet Red Army troops in Mongolia amounted to little more than instructors for the native army and as guards for diplomatic and trading installations. Domestically, it took part in the suppression of the 1932 armed uprising. It also involved in many border conflicts against Manchukuo and the Kwantung Army (one of the largest parts of the Imperial Japanese Army) and the Chinese National Revolutionary Army. The Imperial Japanese Army recorded 152 minor incidents on the border of Manchuria between 1932 and 1934. The number of incidents increased to over 150 per year in 1935 and 1936, and the scale of incidents became larger.

In January 1935, the first armed battle, Halhamiao incident (哈爾哈廟事件, Haruhabyō jiken) occurred on the border between the MPR and Manchukuo. Scores of Mongolian cavalry units engaged with a Manchukuo army patrol unit near the Buddhist temple of Halhamiao. The Manchukuo Army incurred slight casualties, including a Japanese military advisor.

Between December 1935 and March 1936, the Orahodoga incident (オラホドガ事件, Orahodoga jiken) (ja) and the Tauran incident (タウラン事件, Tauran jiken) (ja) occurred. In these battles, both the Japanese and Mongolian armies used a small number of armoured fighting vehicles and military aircraft.

In the 1939 Battles of Khalkhin Gol (also known as the Nomonhan incident), heavily armed Red Army forces under Georgy Zhukov assisted by Mongolian troops under Khorloogiin Choibalsan decisively defeated Imperial Japanese Army forces under Michitarō Komatsubara. During a meeting with Joseph Stalin in Moscow in early 1944, Choibalsan requested military assistance to the MPRA for border protection. Units of Mongolian People's Revolutionary Army were also supported and allied with the Soviet Red Army on the western flank of the Soviet invasion of Manchuria in 1945. As part of the Cavalry mechanized group of the Transbaikal Front under General Issa Pliyev, Mongolian troops under General Jamiyangiin Lhagvasuren comprised the 5th, 6th, 7th, and 8th Cavalry Divisions, the 7th Motorized Armored Brigade, the 3rd Tank Regiment, and the 3rd Artillery Regiment.

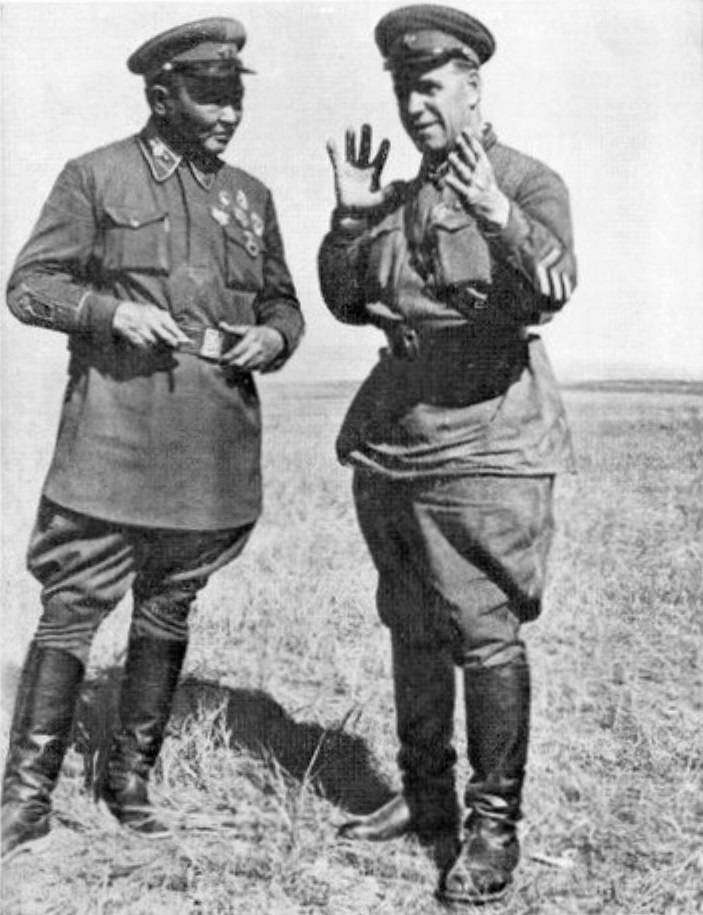
Georgy Zhukov (right) and Khorloogiin Choibalsan (left) consult during the Battle of Khalkhin Gol.

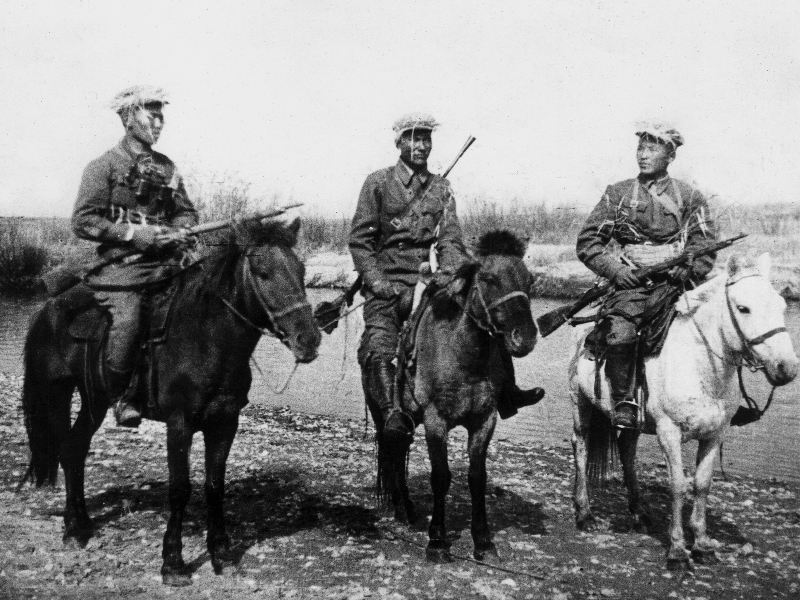
Mongolian cavalry in the Khalkhin Gol, 1939.

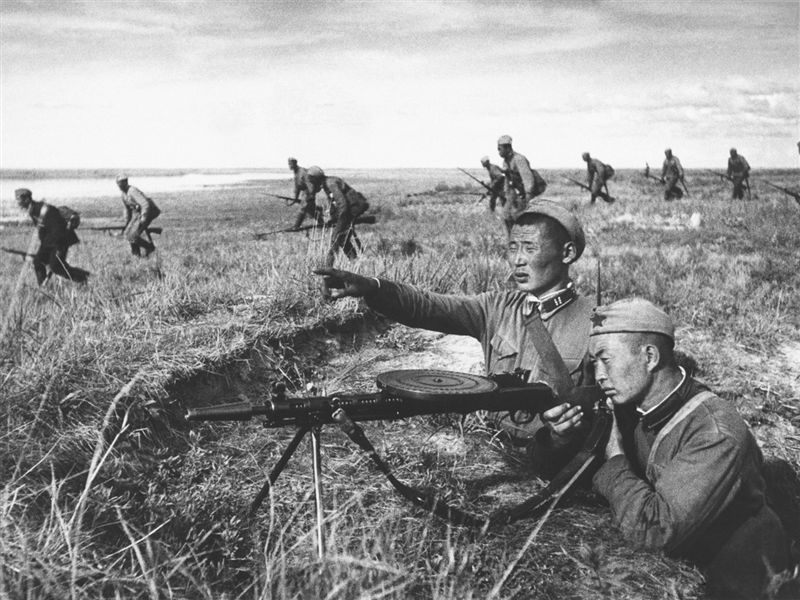
Mongolian troops defend against a Japanese counterattack on the western beach of the Khalkhin Gol, 1939.

=== Great Repression ===
Mongolian soldier with Japanese prisoners of war, 1939.

Between 1937 and 1939, during an 18-month-long period of purges, monks who were not executed were forcibly conscripted into the MPRA. At the same time, 187 persons from the military leadership were killed on the orders of Marshal Khorloogiin Choibalsan. The army, under the leadership of Choibalsan since the 1920s, stayed linked to Soviet Red Army intelligence groups and the NKVD. The purges came to an end in early-to-mid 1939 when Choibalsan assumed the premiership.

=== Cold war era ===
After the end of World War II, de-militarization efforts were implemented to transition the army into peace time. These efforts included the merging of the Ministry of Defence into the Ministry of Public Safety, reduction in troop numbers, reorganization of several military regiments, and disbandment of some border guards. The post-war purpose of the military included national security, protection of local communist establishments, and collaboration with Soviet forces in future military actions against exterior enemies.

By the end of 1945, it was reported that 42,680 soldiers were serving in the Mongolian People's Revolutionary Army, and 10,570 soldiers in the border guard, with a total active personnel of 53,250. After 8 military reductions carried out between 1946 and 1956, the MPRA was reduced by 90 percent, leaving 4,256 people in the army and 213 in the border troops. Additionally, 3,692 officers were actively serving in 1945, which later reduced to 482 officers as of 16 October 1956.

In 1947, during the ongoing Chinese Civil War, a border skirmish occurred along the border in Xinjiang. In the subsequent Battle of Baitag Bogd, elite Qinghai Chinese Muslim cavalry were sent by the Chinese Kuomintang to destroy the Mongolian and Soviet positions.

With the disbandment of the 5th Cavalry Division on 31 May 1954, the MPRA no longer had any cavalry divisions in its organization. On 6 July 1955, the name of the armed forces was changed from the Mongolian People's Revolutionary Army to the People's Army of the Mongolian People's Republic, the People's Army for short.

During the unravelling of the Sino-Soviet split, the army underwent military reorganization and modernisation in the following years under Yumjaagiin Tsedenbal. In February 1957, the Politburo of the Central Committee of the MPRP passed a resolution on the establishment of a voluntary association to assist the People's Army. On 23 June 1959, the Ministry of Defence (Ардын Цэргийн Хэргийг Эрхлэх Яам) was re-established from the Ministry of Public Safety with colonel general Jamiyangiin Lhagvasuren as minister. In 1961, the Defense and Labor Association was established by the Council of Ministers of the MPR. The first civil defense in the country was established in 1964 as the 122nd Civil Defense Battalion of the People's Army. Moreover, all Mongolian citizens were obliged to participate in civil defense training organized by the Civil Defense Office of the Ministry of Defense. Starting in 1960, an independent branch with special functions in reorganizing the People's Army was established. On 6 March 1971, the People's Army was renamed to the Mongolian People's Army.

In 1971–72, Mongolian forces were listed as two infantry divisions; 40 T-34 and 100 T-54/55 tanks; 10 SU-100 tank destroyers, BTRs, and Air Force of 1,000 men with no combat aircraft. The Air Force has transports, trainers, and 10 Mil Mi-1 and Mil Mi-4 helicopters.

== Education ==
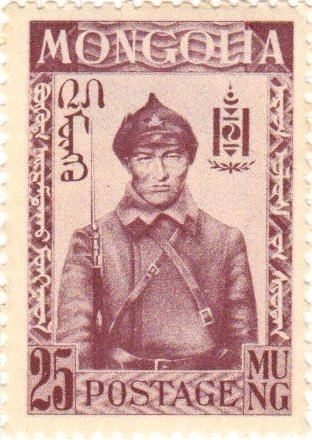
An MPRA soldier on a 1932 Mongolian stamp.

Relief, displaying revolutionary heroism, on the wall of the National Museum of Mongolia.

=== Political indoctrination ===
The central Political Administration Unit was established in the army in 1921 to supervise the work of political commissars (Politruk) and party cells in all army units and to provide a political link with the Central Committee of the MPRP in the army. The unit served to raise morale and to prevent enemy political propaganda. Up to one third of army units were members of the party and others were in the Mongolian Revolutionary Youth League.

The army received sixty percent of the government budget in early years and it was expanded from 2,560 men in 1923 to 4,000 in 1924 and to 7,000 in 1927. The native armed forces stayed linked to Soviet Red Army intelligence groups and NKVD, Mongolian secret police, and Buryat Mongol Comintern agents acted as administrators and represented the real power in the country albeit under direct Soviet guidance.

=== Training ===
By 1926 the government planned to train 10,000 conscripts annually and to increase the training period to six months. Chinese intelligence reports in 1927 indicated that between 40,000 and 50,000 reservists could be mustered at short notice. In 1929 a general mobilization was called to test the training and reserve system. The expected turnout was to have been 30,000 troops but only 2,000 men presented. This failure initiated serious reforms in recruiting and training systems.

== Organization ==
=== Strength ===
In 1921–1927, the land forces, almost exclusively horsemen, numbered about 17,000 mounted troops and boasted more than 200 heavy machine guns, 50 mountain howitzers, 30 field guns, seven armored cars, and a maximum of up to 20 light tanks.

=== Basic units and motorization ===
The basic unit was the 2,000-man cavalry regiment consisting of three squadrons. Each 600-plus-man squadron was divided into five companies: a machine gun company, and an engineer unit. Cavalry regiments were organized into larger units—brigades or divisions—which included artillery and service support units. The chief advantage of this force was mobility over the great distances in Mongolia: small units were able to cover more than 160 km in 24 hours.

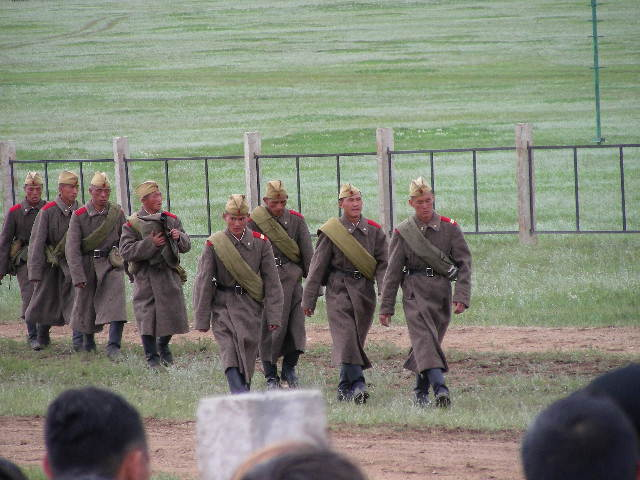
Mongolian People's Army reenactors in 2006.

== Branches ==
=== Special troops of the Ground Forces ===
==== Armoured corps ====
Under Soviet support campaign for mechanization, the army formed its first mechanized unit in 1922. Also it was by structure in the ground force half-mechanization cavalry in the other units distributed to light armored vehicles until 1943. It began to process to motorised since 1943. This is a list of Mongolian People's Army tanks and armour during the 1922s-World War II period.

==== Anti-aircraft forces ====
Although little attention was paid to anti-aircraft weaponry in the Mongolian People's Army, a few dozen units of Soviet origin were known to be distributed to light armored outfits.

=== Mongolian People's Army Air Force ===
Roundel of the Mongolian People's Army Air Force

The Mongolian People's Army Aviation drastically improved with Soviet training and vastly ameliorated within a time span of several years.

In May 1925, a Junkers F.13 entered service as the first aircraft in Mongolian civil and military-related aviation. In March 1931, the Soviet Union donated three Polikarpov R-1s to the Mongolian People's Army, with Mongolia further purchasing three R-1s.

During the 1932 uprising in Western Mongolia, both Soviet and Mongolian-operated R-1s took part in actions against the rebellion. The aircraft carried out reconnaissance, leaflet dropping, and bombing missions. Chinese intelligence reports that in 1945 the Mongolian People's Air Force had been with a three-fighter and three-bomber aviation-regiment, and one flight training school and greater air squadrons. It was reported that headquartered in the Mukden Manchukuo spy-section in October 1944 air force whole units had been 180 aircraft and 1231 airmen. The Mongolian People's Army Aviation demonstrated its full potential during the Battle of Khalkhin Gol, which was its largest engagement. Apart from intercepting intruding aircraft, the air force was used heavily to repress domestic rebel movements.

The Mongolian People's Air Force has operated a variety of aircraft types.

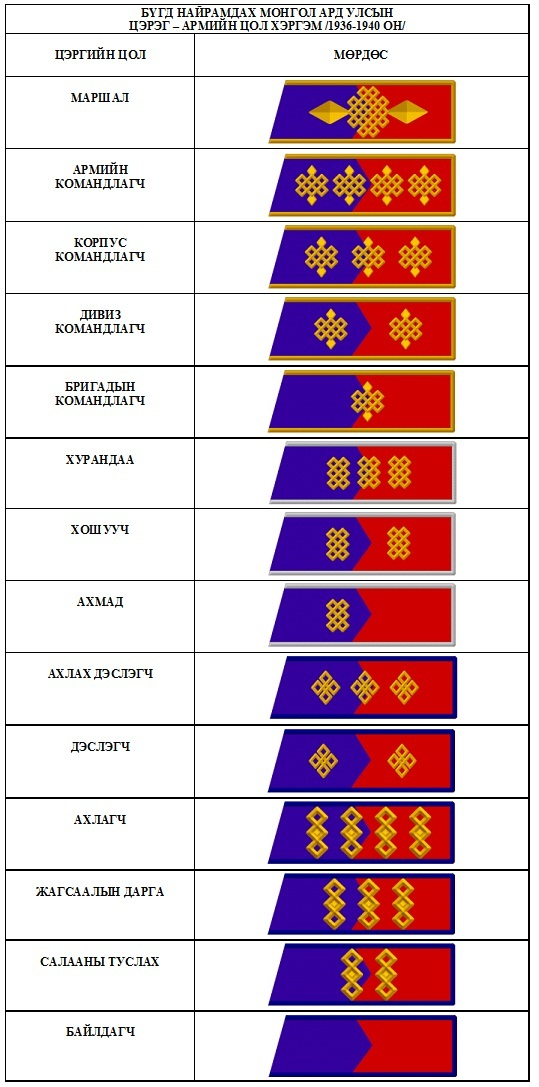
Rank Insignia of the Mongolian People's Revolutionary Army between 1936 and 1940.

== Army ranks and uniform ==
Military uniform of the Marshal of the Mongolian People's Republic, the highest rank of the army from 1936 to 1992.

- Conscript soldiers
  - Private
  - Lance Corporal
  - Corporal
  - Senior Corporal
- NCO's
  - Junior Sergeant
  - Sergeant
  - Senior Sergeant
  - Training Sergeant
  - Lead Sergeant
- Officers
  - 2nd Lieutenant
  - 1st Lieutenant
  - Captain
  - Major
  - Lieutenant Colonel
  - Colonel
  - Brigadier General
  - Major General
  - Lieutenant General
  - General

On 28 April 1944, the Council of Ministers promoted the 11 officers to the rank of general, a rank that was never crossed before up until then. This date has been remembered as “Mongolian Generals' Day”. The highest military ranks in the People's Army is army general, but in 2006 the Law on the Legal Status of Military Servicemen was amended to make it more developed to a Western model.

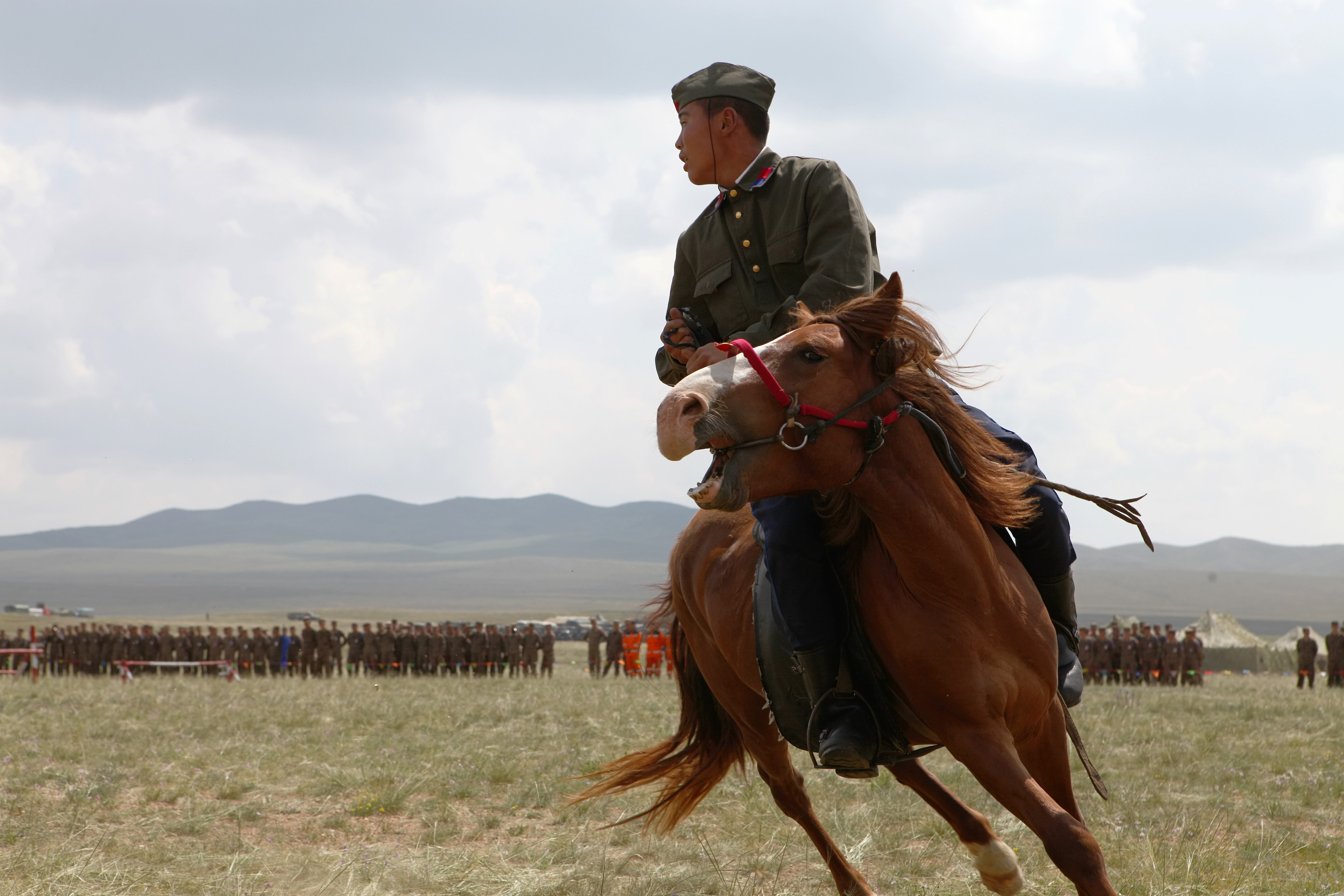
A horseman with MPA-style uniform performs during the opening ceremony of the multinational military execise Khaan Quest in 2013.

Because the establishment of the Armed Forces was based on a Soviet military system in the 1920s, the Mongolian People's Army used similar uniforms with the Red Army, only with Mongolian distinctions. Until 1924, the People's Army personnel wore traditional deel, which had their respective shoulder insignias.

In the mid-1930s, the army adopted Soviet Gymnasterka and developed its true rank and distinction system. All personnel were distinct by their sleeve and collar insignias from the general population when the gymnastyorka was rather popular. After the Battle of Khalkhin Gol, slight modifications were made. In 1944, all uniforms and insignia were significantly changed to include shoulder insignia and camouflage cloaks, similar to Soviet uniform modifications but on olive green.

From the 1960s, the equipment and uniforms of the Mongolian People's Army were modernized. As before, the Mongolian People's Army (a Soviet ally) was similar to the Soviet Armed Forces in appearance and structure.

== Equipment ==
=== Ground Forces (1950–1990) ===
| Equipment | Origin | Versions | Number | Notes |
Main Battle Tank/Medium Tank
| SU-100 | Soviet Union | Self-propelled gun | 10 | |
| T-34/85 | Soviet Union | Medium Tank | 40 | |
| T-54 | Soviet Union | Medium Tank | 250 | |
| T-55 | Soviet Union | Medium Tank | 250 | |
| T-62 | Soviet Union | Main Battle Tank | 100 | |
Infantry Fighting Vehicle/Armored Personnel Carrier
| BMP-1 | Soviet Union | Infantry Fighting Vehicle | 400 | |
| BTR-40 | Soviet Union | Wheeled armoured personnel carrier | 200 | |
| BTR-60 | Soviet Union | Wheeled armoured personnel carrier | 50 | |
| BTR-152 | Soviet Union | Wheeled armoured personnel carrier | 50 | |
| BRDM-1 | Soviet Union | Armored Personnel Carrier | 150 | |
| BRDM-2 | Soviet Union | Armored Personnel Carrier | 120 | |
Multiple rocket launcher
| BM-21 Grad | Soviet Union | 122 mm Multiple rocket launcher | 130 | |
Towed artillery
| 85 mm divisional gun D-44 | Soviet Union | 85 mm divisional gun | unknown number | |
| 122 mm gun M1931/37 (A-19) | Soviet Union | 122 mm towed gun | 20 | |
| 152 mm howitzer M1943 (D-1) | Soviet Union | 152 mm field gun | unknown number | |
| 122 mm howitzer 2A18 (D-30) | Soviet Union | 122 mm howitzer | 50 | |
| 122 mm howitzer M1938 (M-30) | Soviet Union | 122 mm howitzer | 100 | |
| 130 mm towed field gun M1954 (M-46) | Soviet Union | 130 mm towed field gun | unknown number | |
| 152 mm howitzer-gun M1937 (ML-20) | Soviet Union | 152 mm howitzer gun | unknown number | |
Mortar
| BM-37 | Soviet Union | 82 mm calibre mortar | unknown number | |
| PM-43 | Soviet Union | 120 mm calibre smoothbore mortar | unknown number | |
| M-160 | Soviet Union | 160 mm Divisional mortar | unknown number | |
Anti-tank gun
| SPG-9 | Soviet Union | 73 mm anti-tank gun | unknown number | |
| 85 mm antitank gun D-48 | Soviet Union | 85 mm anti-tank gun | unknown number | |
| 100 mm field gun M1944 (BS-3) | Soviet Union | 100 mm field gun | 25 | |
| T-12 antitank gun | Soviet Union | 100 mm anti-tank gun | 25 | |

=== Air Force (1950–1990) ===
| Name | Origin | Type | Versions | In service | Notes |
Fighter aircraft
| Polikarpov I-15 | Soviet Union | Fighter | I-15bis | 1+ | There may have been two aircraft left. |
| Polikarpov I-16 | Soviet Union | Fighter | I-16Type30 | 1+ | It is possible that there were two aircraft left. |
| Yak-9 | Soviet Union | Fighter | Yak-9P | 34 | It remained in service until the MiG-15 was deployed. |
| Mikoyan-Gurevich MiG-15 Fagot | Soviet Union | Fighter | MiG-15bis | 48 | It was introduced to replace existing reciprocating fighters, including the trainer type described below. |
| Mikoyan-Gurevich MiG-17 Fresco | Soviet Union | Fighter | MiG-17F | 36 | It was deployed as the first aircraft equipped with an afterburner. |
| Mikoyan-Gurevich MiG-21 Fishbed | Soviet Union | Fighter | MiG-21PFM/MF | PFM:30/MF:12 | It was the last fighter jet in service at the time. |
Bomber
| Polikarpov R-Z | Soviet Union | Bomber | RZ | 1 | Mainly survivors of aircraft used against Japan in World War II. |
| Yakovlev UT-2 | Soviet Union | Bomber | UT-2MV | 3 | It is a survival of the aircraft used in the battle against Japan, and it is possible that a light bomber version was introduced to supplement the bomber force. |
Attack aircraft
| Ilyushin Il-2 Bark | Soviet Union | Shturmovik | Il-2M3 | 71 | Received in 1945. It remained in operation until 1954. |
| Polikarpov Po-2 Mule | Soviet Union | pesticide sprayer | Po-2A | 20 | It is possible that it was primarily used as an attack aircraft, carrying bombs. Before 1944, it was called U-2A. |
Transport aircraft
| Boeing 727 | United States of America | Narrow-body Type | Boeing 727-200 | 2 | |
| Tupolev Tu-104 Camel | Soviet Union | Transport aircraft | Tu-104 | 2 | |
| Tupolev Tu-154 Careless | Soviet Union | Transport aircraft | Tu-154M | 1 | |
| Yakovlev Yak-6 Frank | Soviet Union | Transport aircraft | Yak-6M | 2 | |
| Ilyushin Il-12 Coach | Soviet Union | Transport aircraft | Il-12D | 4 | It was used to transport troops and weapons. |
| Ilyushin Il-14 Crate | Soviet Union | Transport aircraft | Il-14T | 6 | It was used to transport troops and weapons. |
| Antonov An-2 Colt | Soviet Union | Transport aircraft | An-2 | 30 | |
| Antonov An-12 Cub | Soviet Union | Transport aircraft | An-12 | 12 | |
| Antonov An-14 Clod | Soviet Union | Transport aircraft | An-14A | 2 | |
| Antonov An-24 Coke | Soviet Union | Transport aircraft | An-24B/RV | B:4 RV:20 | |
| Antonov An-26 Curl | Soviet Union | Transport aircraft | An-26 | 4 | |
| Harbin Y-12 | China | Utility aircraft | Y-12 | 5 | |
| PZL-104 Wilga | Poland | Utility aircraft | Wilga-2 | 3 | |
Training aircraft
| Mikoyan-Gurevich MiG-15 Fagot | Soviet Union | Trainer aircraft | MiG-15UTI | 1 5 || rowspan="6" | | |
| Mikoyan-Gurevich MiG-21 Fishbed | Soviet Union | Trainer aircraft | MiG-21UM | 5~6 | |
| Yakovlev Yak-9 Frank | Soviet Union | Trainer aircraft | Yak-9UV | 9 | |
| Yakovlev Yak-11 Moose | Soviet Union | Trainer aircraft | Yak-11 | 10 | |
| Yakovlev Yak-12 Creek | Soviet Union | Trainer aircraft | Yak-12M | 2 | |
| Yakovlev Yak-18 Max | Soviet Union | Trainer aircraft | Yak-18 | 10 | |
Attack Helicopter
| Mil Mi-24 Hind | Soviet Union | Attack helicopter | Mi-24V | V:11 | Ground support/Anti tank |
Transport Helicopter
| Mil Mi-1 Hare | Soviet Union | Light helicopter | Mi-1 | 5 | Transport |
| Mil Mi-2 Hoplite | Mi-2 | Light helicopter | 1 | | Transport |
| Mil Mi-4 Hound | Mi-4A | Light helicopter | 5 | | Transport |
| Mil Mi-8 Hip | Mi-8T/MT | Light helicopter | 10 | | Transport |
| Kamov Ka-26 Hoodlum | Light utility | Ka-26 | unknown number | | Transport |
SAM
| S-75 Dvina | Soviet Union | Strategic SAM system | S-75 Dvina | 1 | 24 missiles |
| S-200 Angara/Vega/Dubna | Soviet Union | Strategic SAM system | S-200 | unknown number | |
| 9K31 Strela-1 | Soviet Union | Vehicle-mounted SAM system | 9K31 Strela-1 | unknown number | |
| Strela-2 | Soviet Union | Man portable SAM launcher | Strela-2 | 1250 | |
Air Defence Artillery
| ZPU-4 | Soviet Union | Anti-aircraft machine gun | ZPU-4 | unknown number | |
| ZU-23-2 | Soviet Union | Anti-Aircraft Twin Autocannon | ZU-23-2 | unknown number | |
| ZSU-23-4 "Shilka" | Soviet Union | Self-propelled anti-aircraft gun | ZSU-23-4 | unknown number | |
| S-60 | Soviet Union | Autocannon | 57 mm S-60 | unknown number | |
| 61-K | Soviet Union | Air defense gun | 37 mm M1939 | unknown number | |

== See also ==
- 17th Army
- 39th Army
- Tuvan People's Revolutionary Army
