= List of Japanese military detachments in World War II =

Detachments (支隊, shitai) were particular military formations of the Japanese Imperial Army. Detachments were a force of infantry, artillery, armor, and other support units which were temporarily assigned for independent action and had a special mission. Generally such units were named after a leader, for example the Ichiki Detachment was named after Kiyonao Ichiki, and the Yasuoka Detachment was named after Masaomi Yasuoka. Some were named after a location, such as the Aoba Detachment. These designations also often referred to the core or main force under personal command of its operative chief within a division or another Army unit.

The Japanese Imperial Navy also used such formations in special assignments.

== Infantry detachments ==
These units grouped not only infantry units, but usually included artillery, cavalry or armor, engineer and other support units as well.

- South Seas Detachment - a brigade-size force formed in 1941 to be the army unit used in the Japanese seizure of the South Pacific island groups of Wake, Guam and the Gilberts. As part of the South Seas Force, it fell under Imperial Japanese Navy command and control. It was drawn from the 55th Division and was commanded by Major General Horii.
- Matsumoto Force (led by LtCol. Matsumoto)
- Yamamoto Unit (124th Infantry Regiment) (led by Colonel Yamamoto)
- Kaneuji Unit (Commanded by Major Kaneuji)
- Bodjonegoro Raiding Unit (also designated as Kitamura Force) (Led by LtCol. Kuro Kitamura)
- Tjepoe Raiding Unit (also designated as Tanaka Unit) (Guided by Colonel Tohru Tanaka) (see Tjepoe)
- Abe Unit (Led for MjrGen. Koichi Abe)
- Imai Unit (Commanded by Colonel Hifumi Imai)
- Shoji Detachment (Led by Colonel Toshishige Shoji)
- Nasu Detachment (Guided by MajGen Yumio Nasu)
- Fukushima Detachment (Command for Colonel Kyusaku Fukushima)
- Kanemura Detachment (Led by Major Matabei Kanemura)
- Yamamoto Detachment (also Yamamoto Force) (led by MajGen Tsunoru Yamamoto)
- Ichiki Detachment (Commanded by MajGen Kiyonao Ichiki)
- Kawaguchi Detachment (also Kawaguchi Force) (led by MajGen Kiyotake Kawaguchi)
- Nakai Detachment (Commanded by MajGen Masutaro Nakai)
- Sakaguchi Detachment (led by MajGen Shizuo Sakaguchi)
- Hyakutate Detachment (Commanded by MajGen Haruyoshi Hyakutate)
- Horii Detachment (Led by MajGen Tomitaro Horii)
- Aoba Detachment (built around 4th Infantry Regiment, named after Mt. Aoba)
- Nanyo Detachment (sometimes Itoh Detachment) (Commanded by MajGen Takeo Itoh)
- Harada Detachment (also 2nd Nanyo Detachment Unit) (led by MajGen Yoshikazu Harada)
- Yamagata Detachment (Commanded by MajGen Rikao Yamagata)
- Hokkai Detachment (Hokkai Garrison Unit) (led by Mjr.Matsutoshi Hozumi and MajGen Juichiro Mineki)
- Attu Garrison Unit (Commanded by Col. Yasuyo Yamazaki)
- Nanto Detachment (led by MajGen Minoru Sasaki)
- Sano Detachment (commanded by LtGen. Tadayoshi Sano)
- Kume Detachment (led by LtCol. Kume)
- Sendai Detachment (conformed by elements of 2nd Division, under Commander Sendai)
- Kobayashi Detachment
- Kokushi Detachment
- Yoshida Detachment

== Armored detachments ==
These could be armored sections of infantry detachments or completely independent armor units.

- Yasuoka Detachment
- Saeki Detachment
- Sakaguchi Detachment
- Itoh Detachment (Army Gr.)
- 1st Special Tank Company
- Anai Tankette Unit
- Iwashita Independent Tank Company
- Special Tank Company of China Detachment Tank Unit
- Kamiyoshi Detachment
- Shoji Detachment
- 48th Recon Regiment
- 56th Infantry Group Tankette Unit
- Itoh SNLF Detachment (Navy Gr.)
- Makin Detachment of 3rd Naval Special Base Force
- Kwajalein Armor Detachment of Sasebo 7th SNLF

== Airborne detachments ==
Refers to Army airborne/paratroop detachments and units.

- Ohmura Detachment (Led by Captain Fumio Ohmura)
- Kaoru Detachment (Commanded by Commander Officer Kaoru)
