= 3rd Tank Regiment (Japan) =

- Active: 1937-1945
- Country: Japan
- Branch: Imperial Japanese Army
- Size: Regiment
- Engagements: World War II; Battles of Khalkhin Gol; Second Sino-Japanese War; Operation Ichi-Go

The 3rd Tank Regiment was an armored regiment of the Imperial Japanese Army in World War II. It served in the China/Manchuria theater throughout the war.

== History ==
The 3rd Tank Regiment was created in 1937 by upgrading the 3rd Tank Battalion. At the end of January 1939, Lieutenant Colonel Kiyotake Yoshimaru took command of the regiment; Yoshimaru was promoted to full colonel in March, and under him the regiment participated in the Battles of Khalkhin Gol against the Soviet Union in 1939, as part of the 1st Tank Corps. The other regiment of the 1st Tank Corps was the 4th Tank Regiment, which was equipped mostly with light tanks, and the 1st Tank Corps was part of the Yasuoka Detachment under Major General Masaomi Yasuoka.

At this time the 3rd Tank Regiment had the following order of battle:

- 26 Type 89 I-Go medium tanks armed with a short-barrelled (low-velocity) Type 90 57 mm gun
- 4 Type 97 Chi-Ha medium tanks armed with the similar Type 97 57 mm tank gun
- 4 Type 97 tankettes armed with a Type 94 37 mm tank gun (Note: Nominally; due to production shortages, most Type 97 tankettes were fitted with the Type 97 heavy tank machine gun instead.)
- 7 Type 94 tankettes armed with a light machine guns

Japanese armor fared poorly in these battles, the low-velocity guns being unable to penetrate Soviet armor, while being themselves vulnerable to Soviet high-velocity tank guns. Colonel Yoshimaru himself was killed when his command tank was destroyed by Soviet gun fire on 3 July 1939. During the action of 2 and 3 July, the 3rd Tank Regiment was badly mauled by the Soviet army forces.

3rd Tank Regiment was included in 1st Tank Division when the division was formed at Ningan in Manchukuo in June 1942.

The 3rd Tank Regiment was detached from the 1st Armored Division and attached to 11th Army for Operation Ichi-Go against China in 1944. It remained in China while the rest of the 1st Armored Division returned to Japan for the defense of the home islands, and was disbanded with the rest of the 11th Army in 1945.
