= Khalkhin-Gol =

Board wargame published in 1973

Khalkhin-Gol, subtitled "Tactical Game of the Soviet Japanese War", is a board game published by Simulations Design Corporation (SDC) in 1973 that simulates the decisive battle between Soviet and Japanese forces in 1939.

== Background ==
In 1938, Japanese forces that had occupied Manchuria tried to expand into Mongolia, which was allied with the Soviet Union, leading to the Soviet–Japanese War. There were a number of skirmishes near the Khalkin Gol River before the Soviets attacked in force near Nomonhan on 20 August 1939.

== Contents ==
Khalkhin-Gol is a two-player regimental level game in which the battle from the Soviet-Japanese war is depicted, on the sandy plains and marshes of Mongolia, featuring infantry armies with some tanks, cavalry and artillery. With a 17" x 36" map and only 100 counters, the game is relatively simple, using a standard "I Go, You Go" system of alternating turns.

There is only one scenario that is twelve turns long.

== Publication history ==
In 1973, Dana Lombardy and M.A. Ramsay designed Khalkin-Gol, and it was published as a pull-out game in Issue #5 (June 1973) of SDC's house magazine Conflict. SDC also published it as their fifth "pouch game" (packaged in a ziplock bag).

== Reception ==
In a 1976 poll conducted by SPI to determine the most popular wargames in North America, Khalkin-Gol was rated a very poor 159th out of 202 games.

In the 1977 book The Comprehensive Guide to Board Wargaming, Nicholas Palmer described the game as a "Simple system with considerable realism" and described the depicted scenario as "A tough battle - including infantry leaping onto tanks to destroy them!"

In Issue 15 of the UK wargaming magazine Phoenix, Ron Levell called the counters "disappointing", saying "to call the counters square would be flattering. No two are exactly alike." He thought the Combat Result Table was particularly "bloody" and predicted that "only a dozen units [will be] on the map by the end of the game." Levell also found the victory conditions favored the Japanese player, commenting that "A certain amount of fiddling is required to balance the game." He thought that it was "A challenging game with unusual rules and excellent for the beginner to desert warfare, although experienced players may feel the whole situation is artificial." However, he concluded on a negative note, saying, "unless you are a fanatic on minor engagements in Mongolia (like myself), it is not worth buying [...] unless you are prepared to go to great lengths modifying the rules."

In a retrospective review in Issue 5 of Simulacrum, Brian Train commented "Both sides race around each other's flanks in an effort to destroy enemy units and get to the other side of the Halha River. The speedy units, open flanks and simple victory conditions make for a game that plays in well under two hours."

== Other reviews and commentary ==
- Fire & Movement 71
