= Masaomi =

- Gender: Male

Origin
- Origin: Japanese
- Meaning: Different meanings depending on the kanji used

Masaomi (written: 正臣 or 将臣) is a masculine Japanese given name. Notable people with the name include:

- Masaomi Kanzaki (神崎 将臣), Japanese manga artist
- Masaomi Yasuoka (安岡 正臣; 1886–1948), Japanese general
