= Soviet troops in Mongolia =

Formation of the Soviet Army formerly stationed in Mongolia

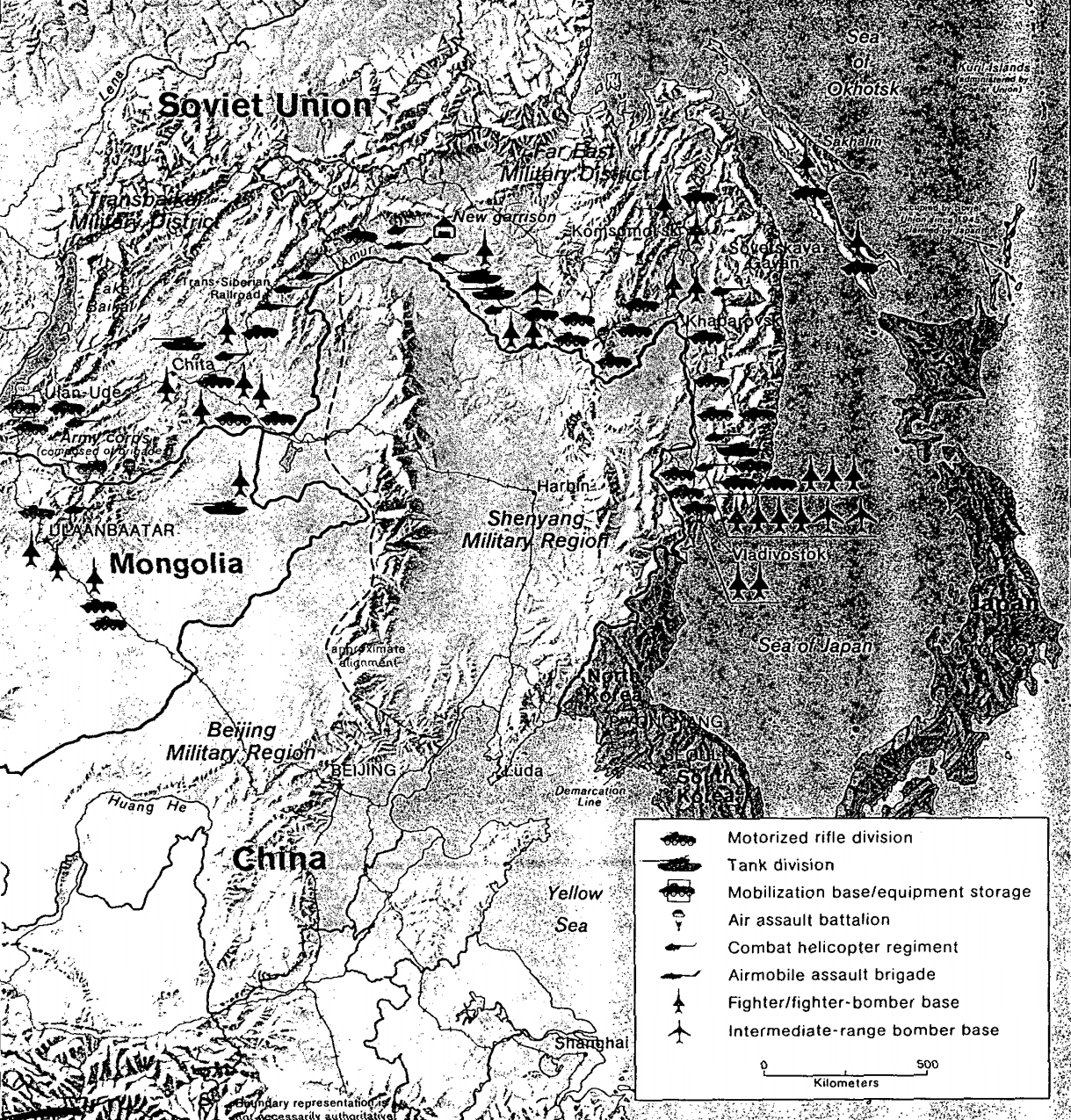
U.S. estimate of key Soviet forces opposite northeastern China, November 1985.

Soviet troops were stationed in Mongolia during the Russian Civil War, the interwar period and the Cold War. The Russian Armed Forces withdrew from Mongolia in late 1992.

For the first time, Soviet troops were introduced into Mongolia in 1921 during the period of Russian Civil War and the Mongolian Revolution in order to attack the anti-communist White Movement, which had a foothold in Mongolia. In March 1925, the Soviets withdrew troops from the country.

Later, Soviet troops were brought in in 1932 to suppress the Khuvsugul uprising, in 1937, which was due to the need to repel Imperial Japanese aggression against the allied Mongolian People's Republic and in 1967 to carry out tasks to defend the country from a potential military threat from China. The Soviet troops stationed on the territory of Mongolia, in contrast to the deployment in other allied countries, did not form a separate "group of forces", "grouping" or "contingent", but were directly subordinate to the MOD/General Staff or the Transbaikal Military District.

== Protocol of 1936 ==
"In January 1936, in the face of an increased threat by Japan, the government of Mongolia turned to the government of the USSR with a request for military assistance. In February of the same year, the Soviet government announced that the Soviet Union would help the MPR protect itself from Japanese aggression. Following this, on 12 March, a Soviet-Mongolian protocol on mutual assistance for a period of 10 years was signed in Ulaanbaatar, which replaced the 1934 agreement. In accordance with this protocol, Soviet troops were deployed on the territory of Mongolia. The 57th Special Rifle Corps, commanded by Ivan Konev, was deployed to Mongolia in September 1937. By late October, its strength had grown to a formidable force of 32,794 men, including 3,124 commanders. The corps fielded 265 tanks, 281 armored vehicles, 108 aircraft, 516 guns, and 5,046 motor vehicles. By 25 May 1939, the number of these troops, which were part of the 57th Special Rifle Corps and took part in the first battles on Khalkhin-Gol, was 5,544 people, of which 523 commanders and 996 junior commanders."

Later, the 17th Army and the 39th Army were stationed in Mongolia. The 39th Army was relocated to Mongolia in May-June 1945, and attacked from Mongolia during the August 1945 Soviet invasion of Manchuria.

Postwar, elements of the 6th Guards Tank Army, headquartered at Choibalsan, continued to be based in Mongolia until Soviet troops withdrew from the country in 1956.

The 39th Combined Arms Army, whose headquarters was in Ulaanbaatar, included two tank divisions (the 2nd Guards Tank Division and 51st Tank Division), three motor rifle divisions, a reconnaissance brigade, two anti-aircraft rocket brigades, a radio engineering brigade, a separate communications regiment, two engineer regiments, an air assault battalion, an electronic warfare battalion, a separate helicopter regiment, and a separate radio battalion.

On 4 February 1989 a Soviet-Chinese agreement was signed to reduce the number of troops on the border. On May 15, 1989, the Soviet leadership announced a partial and then a complete withdrawal of the 39th Army from Mongolia. The army consisted of more than 50 thousand military personnel, 1816 tanks, 2531 armored vehicles, 1461 artillery systems, 190 aircraft and 130 helicopters.

Soviet/Russian troops were finally withdrawn in the early 1990s after the collapse of the Soviet Union. The withdrawal of troops from Mongolia took 28 months. On 25 September 1992, the completion of the withdrawal of troops (by that time, no longer Soviet, but Russian) was officially announced. The last Russian soldiers left Mongolia in December 1992.

== Russian military cooperation ==
On May 21, 2008, the Russian Minister of Defense visited Mongolia, who was received by President Nambaryn Enkhbayar, and held talks with his colleague J. Batkhuyag. A medium-term program of military-technical cooperation was signed. Deliveries of military equipment and weapons to Mongolia from the Russian Ministry of Defense began.
