= Yasuoka Detachment =

Armored Japanese Imperial Army unit in 1939

Yasuoka Detachment (Japanese: 安岡支隊) or Yasuoka Task Force, was an armored Japanese Imperial Army unit in 1939.

== Organisation ==
It was commanded by Lt. General Yasuoka Masaomi, composed of 3rd Tank Regiment and 4th Tank Regiment (seventy-three tanks total), 64th Infantry Regiment/IJA 23rd Division, 2/28th Infantry Regiment/IJA 7th Division, the 2nd Battalion of the 13th Field Artillery Regiment, and 24th Independent Engineer Regiment. It was an armored Detachment of the Kwantung Army organized for the Japanese July 1939 offensive of the Battle of Khalkhin Gol.

== Battle of Khalkhin Gol ==
The Yasuoka Task Force planned to attack Soviet forces on the Halha's east bank, north of the Holsten River while simultaneously, the main force of the IJA 23rd Division would eliminate Soviet forces on the east bank and then cross to the west bank of the Halha River and drive south to the Kawamata Bridge, destroying Soviet artillery batteries and supply dumps along the west bank. The link-up of the two pincer columns in the vicinity of the Kawamata Bridge would encircle the Soviet forces and then destroy them.

The Japanese tank regiments operating on the east bank from July 2, separated and not coordinating with each other or their attached infantry, engineers and artillery failed to break through the Soviet defenses resulting in the loss of half their armor. On July 9 the Yasuoka Task Force was dissolved, Lt. General Yasuoka Masaomi was relieved and the Armour regiments withdrawn.

== Sources ==
- Drea, Edward J., Nomonhan: Japanese-Soviet Tactical Combat, 1939; Leavenworth Paper #2, Combat Studies Institute, U.S. Army Command and General Staff College, Fort Leavenworth, Kansas 66027, 1981.
