= 4th Tank Regiment =

4th Tank Regiment may refer to:

- 4th Royal Tank Regiment, a British unit extant 1917 – 1992
- 4th Tank Regiment (Japan), extant 1934 – 1945
- 4th Tank Regiment (Italy)
