= 3rd Tank Regiment =

3rd Tank Regiment may refer to:

- 3rd Royal Tank Regiment, a British unit extant 1917 – 1992
- 3rd Tank Regiment (Japan), extant 1937 – 1945
