= Nomonhan Burd Obo =

Border cairn between Mongolia and China

Coordinates: 47°46′24″N 118°45′24″E

Nomonhan Burd Obo is an obo, a cairn set as a border marker in the Yongzheng period of the Qing dynasty. The Japanese name "Nomonhan Incident" for the Battles of Khalkhin Gol is after the obo. The clashes resulted from the dispute: Japan maintained that the border between Mongolia and China runs along Khalkhin Gol, while Mongolia and the Soviet Union maintained that the border runs 10 to 20 km northwards and passes by the Nomonhan.
