= Type 98 So-Da =

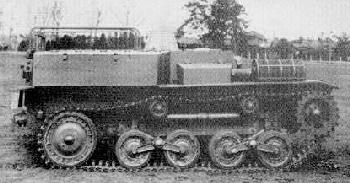
- Type 98 So-Da
- Type: Armored personnel carrier
- Place of origin: Empire of Japan

Production history
- Designed: 1937
- Produced: introduced in 1941

Specifications (Type 98 So-Da)
- Mass: 5 tons
- Length: 3.8 m (12 ft 6 in)
- Width: 1.9 m (6 ft 3 in)
- Height: 1.6 m (5 ft 3 in)
- Crew: 2+4–6
- Armor: 6–12 mm
- Main armament: none
- Engine: diesel 65 PS (48 kW) at 2300 rpm
- Payload capacity: 1 ton
- Suspension: bellcrank
- Operational range: 200 km
- Maximum speed: 45 km/h (28 mph)

The Type 98 So-Da (九八式装甲運搬車 ソダ, Kyūhachi-shiki Sōkounpansha So-Da) was an armored personnel and ammunition carrier used by the Imperial Japanese Army in World War II.

== History and development ==
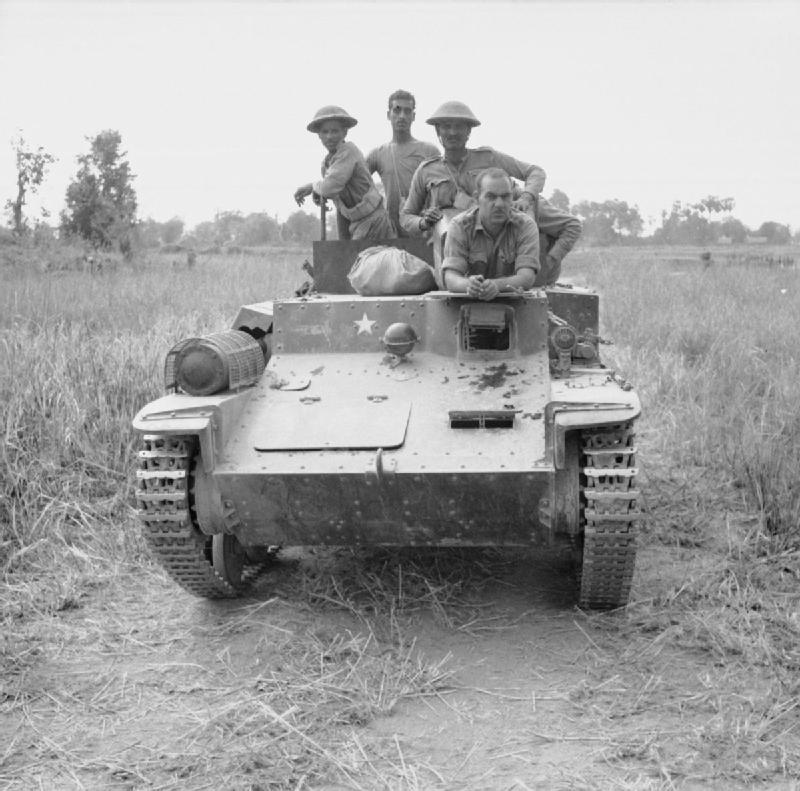
Type 98 So-Da captured by 6th Rajputana Rifles in Burma, February 1945

Type 98 So-Da was designed in 1937, with a chassis based on the Type 97 Te-Ke tankette. However, its engine compartment was moved to the front of the chassis. The fully tracked vehicle was first produced in 1941. The Type 98 So-Da was used as a personnel and ammunition carrier in forward-line areas. In addition, it was also used as an "artillery tractor" to tow a gun trailer.

Its hull had an open top and the "flatbed" in back had a double door at the rear. The flatbed could be covered with a tarp over the three rail supports. The towing coupling was secured to the frame of the hull on a "semi-elliptical spring". This protected the frame while hauling heavy equipment The total number of Type 98 So-Da vehicles produced is unknown.
