= Type 97 Te-Ke tankette =

Japanese tankette

Type 97 Te-Ke
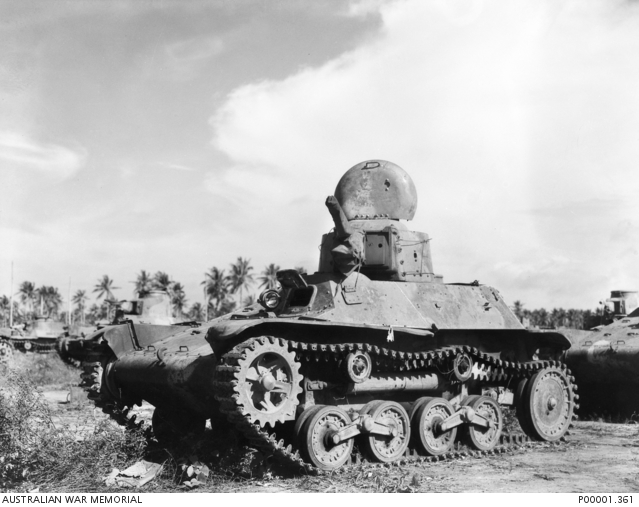
- A Type 97 Te-Ke in New Britain, 1945
- Type: Tankette
- Place of origin: Empire of Japan

Production history
- Designed: 1936–1937
- Unit cost: 37,200 yen ($9,996 USD) in August 1939, excluding armament
- Produced: 1938–1944
- No. built: 616

Specifications
- Mass: 4.7 tonnes (4.6 long tons; 5.2 short tons)
- Length: 3.68 m (12 ft 1 in)
- Width: 1.80 m (5 ft 11 in)
- Height: 1.9 m (6 ft 3 in)
- Crew: 2 (commander, driver)
- Armor: 4–16 mm (0.16–0.63 in)
- Main armament: 37 mm Type 94 tank gun or 7.7 mm Type 97 machine gun
- Engine: Ikegai air-cooled inline 4-cylinder diesel 65 hp (48 kW)
- Power/weight: 10 hp/t (7.5 kW/t)
- Suspension: 2-wheel bogie
- Operational range: 250 kilometers (160 mi)
- Maximum speed: 42 km/h (26 mph)

The Type 97 Light armored car Te-Ke (九七式軽装甲車 テケ, Kyū-nana-shiki kei sōkōsha Teke) was a tankette used by the Imperial Japanese Army in the Second Sino-Japanese War, at Nomonhan against the Soviet Union, and in World War II. It was designed as a fast reconnaissance vehicle, and was a replacement for the earlier Type 94 tankette.

== History and development ==
The origins of the Type 97 lay in a prototype diesel-engine version of the Type 94 TK developed by Hino Motors in 1936. Although the prototype had a more powerful engine and larger gun, initial trials were not successful and the Japanese Army demanded changes before acceptance. Hino responded with a modified prototype in November 1937, in which the engine was moved towards the rear of the chassis. This design was accepted and full production began in 1938. A total of 616 units were produced from 1937 to 1944 (1 prototype unit in 1937, 56 units in 1938, 217 units in 1939, 284 units in 1940, 58 units between 1941 and 1944).

== Design ==
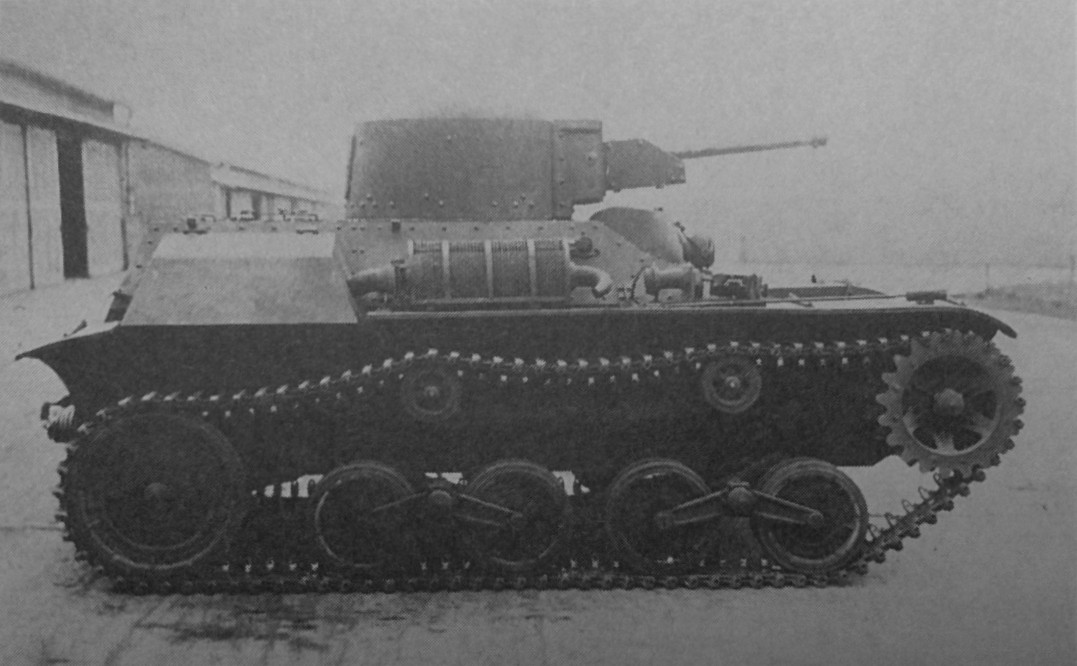
Type 97 Te-Ke side view

Although the chassis was similar in appearance, the design of the Type 97 was different from the Type 94 in several significant areas. The engine was moved to the rear and the gun turret (commander position) moved to the middle of the tankette, with the driver located to the left side of the hull. This gave the two men a better position to communicate with each other. As with the Type 94, the interior was lined with heat absorbing asbestos sheets.

The main armament was the Type 94 37 mm tank gun, with 96 rounds, barrel length of 136 cm (L36.7), EL angle of fire of −15 to +20 degrees, AZ angle of fire of 20 degrees, muzzle velocity of 600 m/s, penetration of 45 mm/300 m, which was also used by Type 95 Ha-Go. However, due to shortages in the production of this weapon, many vehicles were fitted with a 7.7 mm Type 97 machine gun instead.

The Type 97 replaced the Type 94 on the assembly line in 1939, it was primarily assigned to reconnaissance regiments, and, as with US Army tanks prior to 1941, it was not designed to engage enemy tanks. Because it was a reconnaissance vehicle, built for speed, and not direct combat, its hull and turret were designed for only two crewmen; leaving the tankette commander to load and fire the main gun. As with most tankettes, it was severely deficient in armor protection, and was prey for any "anti-tank weapon".

== Variants ==
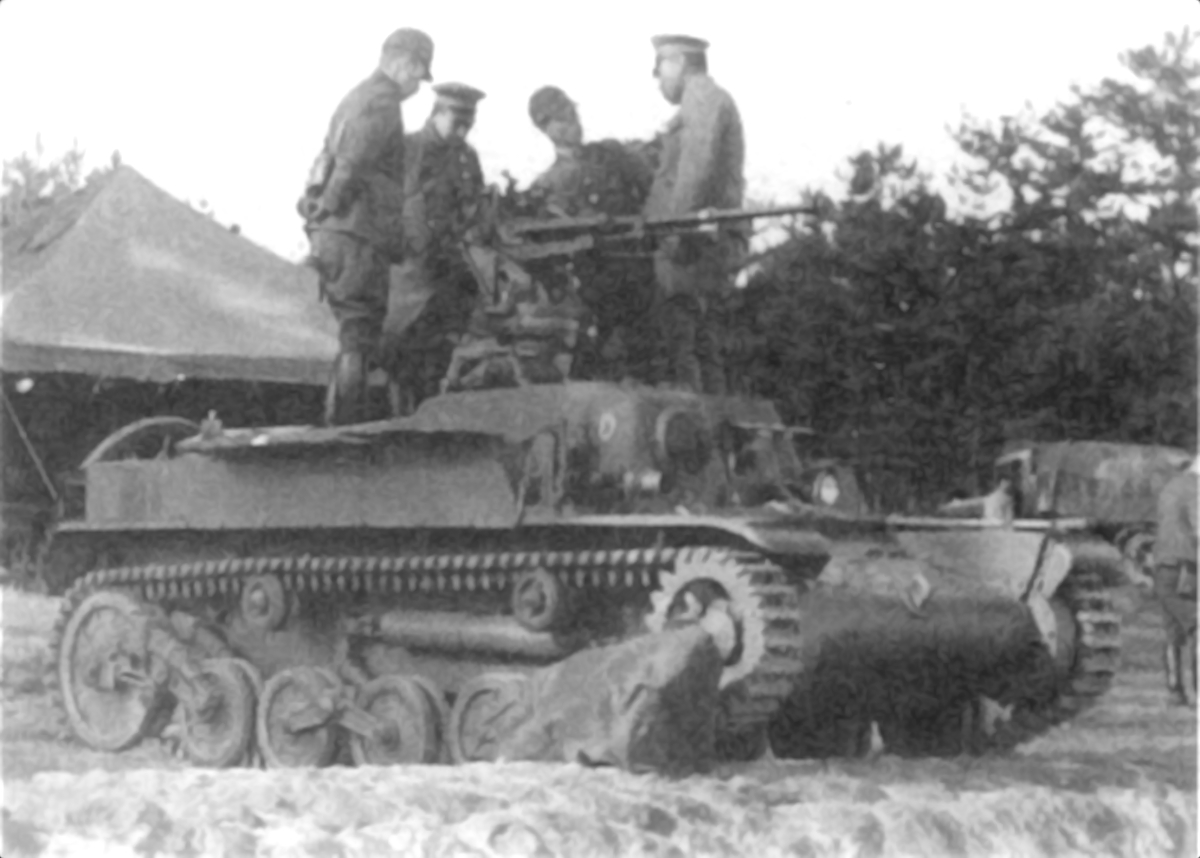
Type 97 Ki-To SPAAG

Several variants of the Type 97 were produced. The Type 98 So-Da APC was designed for use as an armored personnel and ammunition carrier. Production of the vehicle began in 1941. The Type 100 Te-Re was designed for use as an artillery observation vehicle. It went into production in 1940.

Another variant saw the Type 97 modified into the prototype Ki-To SPAAG. The Type 97 turret was removed and a single Type 98 20 mm autocannon was mounted on the chassis. There was no protective gun shield for the crew. The chassis was elongated with an extra road-wheel on each side. It did not enter production.

In addition, the Type 97 disinfecting vehicle and Type 97 gas scattering vehicle were produced. They were based on the Type 97 Te-Ke chassis, but had a Type 94 tankette turret. The Type 97 Te-Ke was modified and used as a "tractor"; closed for protection against the chemical agents. It would pull either a configured independent tracked mobile liquid dissemination chemical vehicle or a respective tracked mobile disinfecting anti-chemical agents vehicle. They operated in the same way as its predecessors, the Type 94 disinfecting vehicle and Type 94 gas scattering vehicle.

== Operational history ==
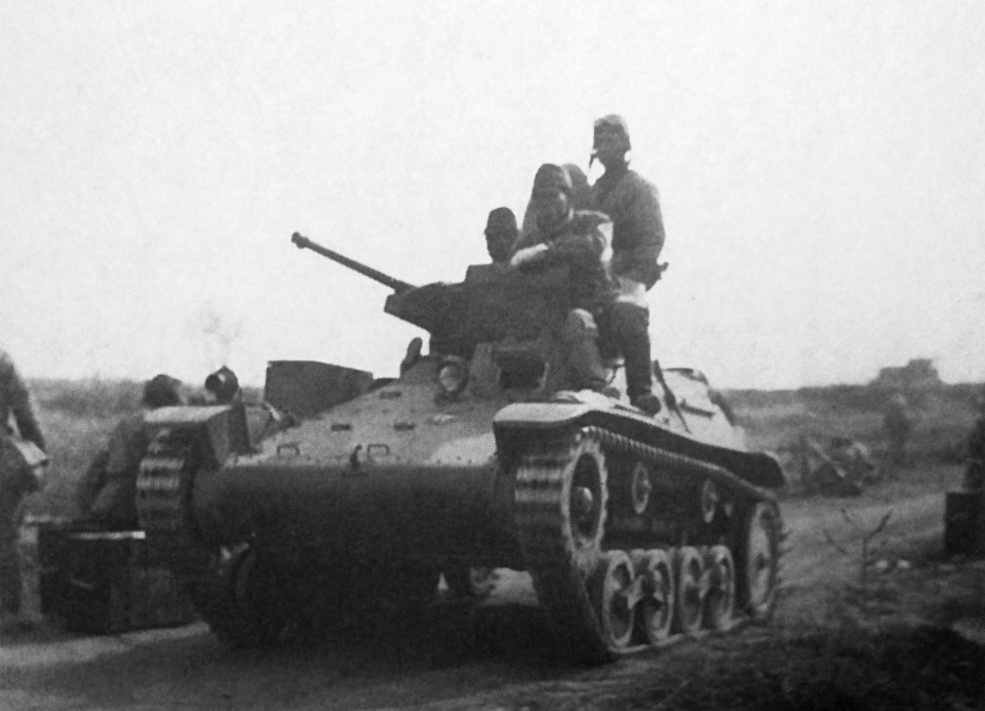
Type 97 Te-Ke tankette in China

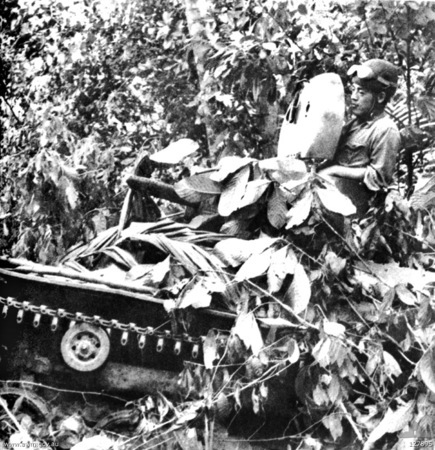
A camouflaged Type 97 Te-Ke in the Battle of Muar, 17 January 1942

Typically, Type 97s were distributed to support infantry divisions, where they were very often used as armored tractors, supply vehicles, and for recon/scouting.

The Type 97 was successfully fielded in China during the Second Sino-Japanese War of 1938–1945, as the Chinese National Revolutionary Army had only three tank battalions, which themselves consisted of some Italian CV33 tankettes. Their light weight enabled them to be transported easily across the sea or rivers. The Type 97 tankettes first real test of combat came during the Battle of Nomonhan during the months of May through August in 1939 against the Red Army of the Soviet Union. Although not designed for such combat, the 97 tankette went up against Russian anti-tank guns and 45mm high velocity guns of the Soviet BT-5 and BT-7 light tanks. The Japanese tank force in which they were included was decimated.

With the start of World War II, the Type 97 contributed to the Japanese victories at the Battle of Malaya and the Battle of the Philippines, as its light weight enabled the tank to traverse unsupported bridges and ferry crossing that would be unable to take heavier tanks, and its small size allowed it to travel along the long winding and narrow roads in the area.

After the end of World War II, Type 97 tankettes that were stationed in Dutch East Indies was used by the Indonesian Army during the Indonesian National Revolution.

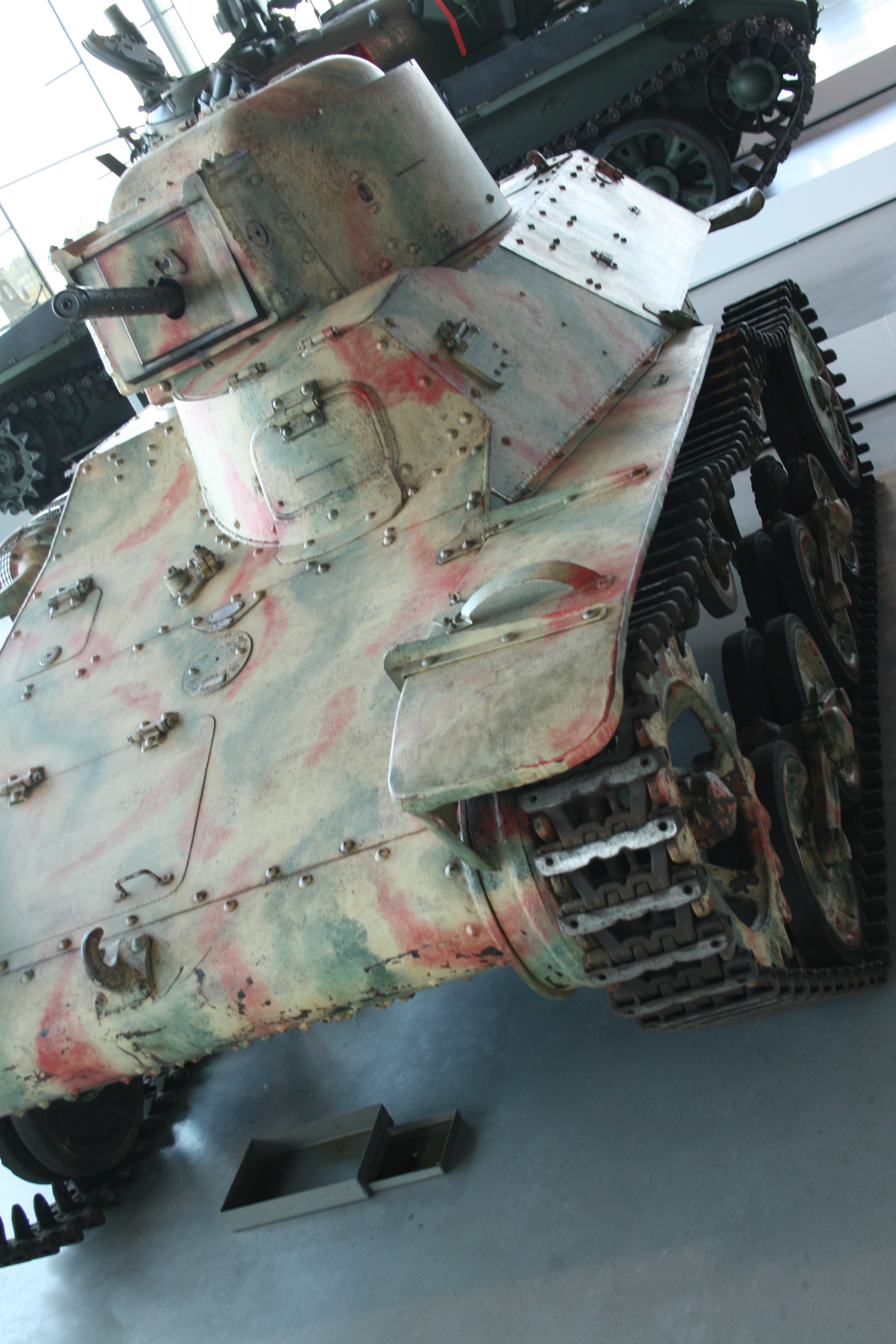
Type 97 Te-Ke at the Nationaal Militair Museum, The Netherlands. Note the 7.7 mm machine gun as main armament

== Survivors ==
Type 97 Te-Ke

- Nationaal Militair Museum, Soesterberg, Netherlands (7.7 mm)
- Patriot Park, Kubinka, Russia (37 mm)
- Defense Services Museum, Naypyidaw, Myanmar (37 mm)
- Kokopo War Museum, Kokopo, Papua New Guinea (37 mm)
- Adams Brothers Corporation Collection, Kolonia, Micronesia (7.7 mm)
- Nippo Maru wreck, Chuuk Lagoon, Micronesia (Unknown)
- Royal Australian Armoured Corps Memorial and Army Tank Museum, Puckapunyal, Australia (37 mm)
- National Armor and Cavalry Museum, Fort Benning, USA (7.7 mm)
- National Museum of Military Vehicles, Dubois, USA (7.7 mm)
- Camp San Luis Obispo, California, USA (37 mm)
- Ross Rockstad Collection, USA (Unknown)
- Meiktila, Mandalay Region, Myanmar (Hull Only)
- American Heritage Museum, Stow MA, USA, (chemical warfare variant, hull only)
