= Type 100 Te-Re =

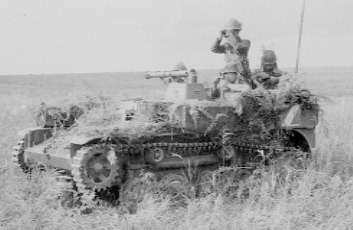
- Type 100 Te-Re artillery observers vehicle
- Type: Artillery Observation Vehicle
- Place of origin: Empire of Japan

Service history
- In service: 1940–1945
- Used by: Empire of Japan
- Wars: Second Sino-Japanese War, World War II

Specifications
- Mass: 4.9 tonnes
- Length: 4.07 meters
- Width: 1.99 meters
- Height: 1.9 meters
- Crew: 6–8
- Armor: 6 mm
- Engine: diesel 65 hp (48 kW)
- Maximum speed: 40 km/h

The Type 100 Te-Re was an artillery observation vehicle of the Imperial Japanese Army used to spot and recon for self-propelled gun and stationary artillery.

== Design ==
Based on the chassis of the Type 97 Te-Ke tankette, production of the vehicle began in 1940. The Type 100 Te-Re was able to accommodate a crew of six to eight, while designed to carry observation and radio equipment. The rear compartment was for the spotters and radio operator instead of being used for storing cargo or troops. It was fitted with a large radio, observation equipment and a cable reel. The exact number of units converted and produced is not known. Estimates vary between 80 or 100 to 150 units produced. They were mainly used in the Second Sino-Japanese War.

== Operation ==
Using the radio and observation equipment, the spotters would find and relay targets to artillery positions. They would act as observers for artillery and provide firing corrections for targets, as needed.
