= 4th Tank Regiment (Imperial Japanese Army) =

- Active: 1934-1945
- Country: Japan
- Branch: Imperial Japanese Army
- Size: Regiment
- Engagements: World War II; Battles of Khalkhin Gol; Pacific War; Invasion of the Philippines; Battle of Binalonan; Dutch East Indies campaign

The 4th Tank Regiment was a unit of the Imperial Japanese Army in World War II.

== History ==
The 4th Tank Regiment was created in 1934 by an upgrade of the 4th Tank Battalion. The 4th Tank Regiment participated in the Battles of Khalkhin Gol against the Soviet Union in 1939. The commander was Tamado Yoshio, and the 4th Tank Regiment was brigaded into the 1st Tank Corps with the 3rd Tank Regiment, the group under the overall command of Major General Yasuoka. The 4th Tank Regiment at that time was equipped with mostly light tanks, complementing the medium tanks of the 3rd Tank Regiment. The 4th Tank Regiment order of battle at this time was:

- 35 Type 95 Ha-Go light tanks armed with the Type 94 37 mm tank gun
- 8 Type 89 I-Go medium tanks armed with a short-barrelled (low-velocity) Type 90 57 mm gun
- 3 Type 94 tankettes armed with a light machine gun

The 4th Tank Regiment was equipped with Type 97 Chi-Ha tanks in 1941 to replace the Type 89 I-Go, and the regiment was part of the forces used for the Japanese conquest of Luzon in the Philippines and the conquest of Java and Sumatra in 1942. For the campaign, it was under command of Lieutenant Colonel Kumagaya, and consisted solely of 38 Type 95 light tanks with five captured US M3 Light tanks.

Thereafter, the 4th Tank Regiment remained stationed in the Dutch East Indies for the rest of the war.
