= Battles of Khalkhin Gol =

1939 border clashes between Imperial Japan and the Soviet Union

- Part of the Soviet–Japanese border conflicts and World War II
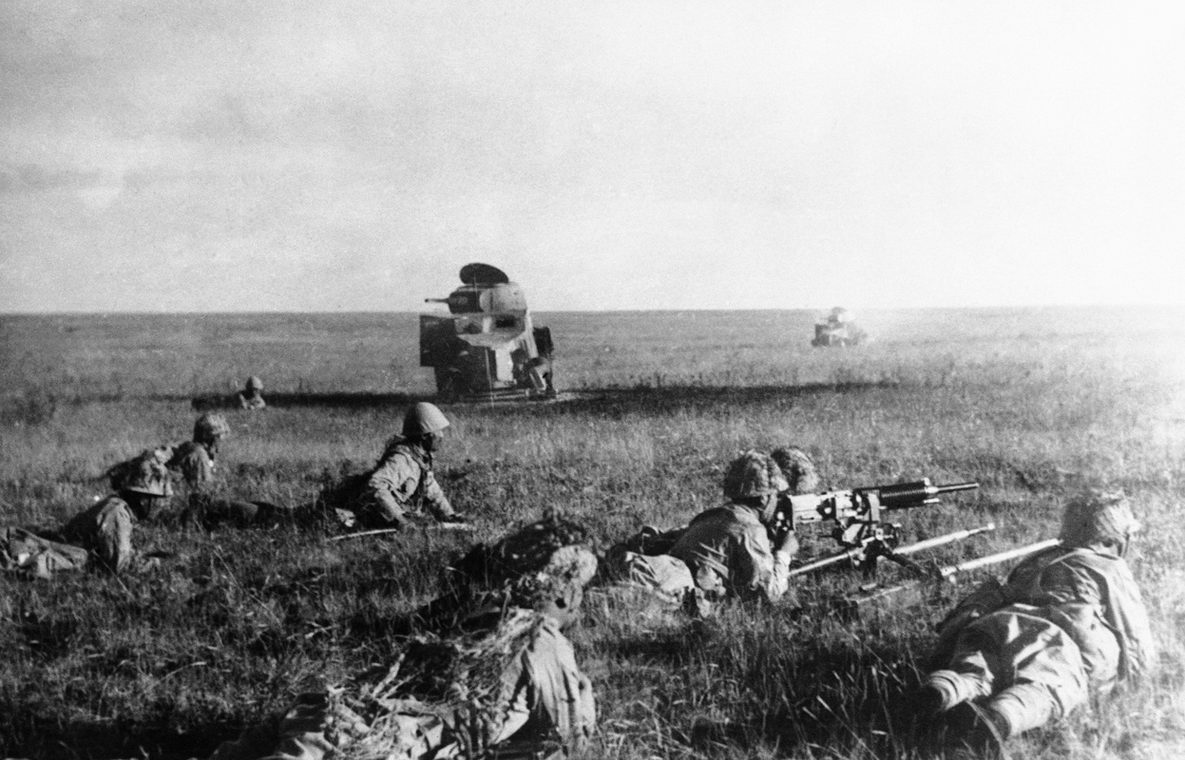
- Japanese infantrymen near wrecked Soviet armored vehicles, July 1939
Date	11 May – 16 September 1939 (4 months and 5 days)
Location	Khalkh River, Mongolian People's Republic 47°43′49″N 118°35′24″E
Result	Soviet–Mongolian victory
Territorial changes	Status quo ante bellum; enforcement of border claims in accordance with the Soviet and Mongolian interpretation.

Belligerents
Soviet Union (Mongolian People's Republic) Mongolia	Japan; Manchukuo

Commanders and leaders
(Soviet Union) Grigory Shtern; (Soviet Union) Georgy Zhukov; (Soviet Union) Yakov Smushkevich; (Mongolian People's Republic) Khorloogiin Choibalsan	(Empire of Japan) Michitarō Komatsubara; (Empire of Japan) Masaomi Yasuoka; (Empire of Japan) Kōtoku Satō; (Manchukuo) Urzhin Garmaev

Strength
57,000 (late August); 498–550 tanks 385–450 armored cars 900 aircraft (total), peak strength 623; 546 artillery pieces (156 100mm+); 4,000 trucks 1,921 horses and camels (Mongol only)	25,000 (late August); 73 tanks 19 tankettes Tanks withdrawn after July action 400 aircraft (total), peak strength 255; 277 artillery pieces (50 100mm+); 2,000 trucks (20 August); 2,708 horses

Casualties and losses
Manpower total: 26,211–28,169 casualties (Note: 9,703 dead and missing, 15,251 wounded, 701 to 2,225 hospitalized due to disease. Boris Sokolov writes that according to E. I. Smirnov's "Война и военная медицина. 1939–1945 годы" ("War and military medicine. 1939–1945") the figure of 701 only accounts for sick patients who were treated in hospitals of the Transbaikal Military District and that the total number of ill during the campaign was 2,225.) (Soviet Union) 24,903 combat 752–2,276 noncombat (Mongolian People's Republic) 556–990; Equipment: 250 aircraft lost 253 tanks destroyed or crippled 133 armored cars destroyed 96 mortars and artillery 49 tractors and prime movers 652 trucks and other motor vehicles significant animal casualties	Manpower total: ~20,000 casualties (Note: Japanese military record: 8,440 killed, 8,766 wounded Soviet claim: 60,000 killed and wounded, 3,000 captured); See § Casualties. (Empire of Japan) 17,364–17,716 combat 2,350 noncombat (Manchukuo) 2,895 (Soviet claim); Equipment: 162 aircraft lost 29 tanks destroyed or crippled 7 tankettes destroyed 72 artillery pieces (field guns only); 2,330 horses killed, injured, or sick significant motor vehicle losses
- Location within Mongolia Khalkhin Gol/Nomonhan (Inner Mongolia)

The Battles of Khalkhin Gol (Russian: Бои на Халхин-Голе, romanized: Boy na Khalkhin-Gole; Mongolian: Халхын голын байлдаан, romanized: Khalkhyn golyn baildaan), known in Japan as the Nomonhan Incident (Japanese: ノモンハン事件, Hepburn: Nomonhan jiken) after Nomonhan Burd Obo, were the decisive engagements of the undeclared Soviet–Japanese border conflicts which involved the Soviet Union, Mongolia, Japan, and Manchukuo in 1939. The conflict is named after the river Khalkhin Gol, which passes through the battlefield. The Soviet offensive, led by general Georgy Zhukov, utilized airplanes, tanks, and infantry in a simultaneous three-pronged offensive, the first of its kind in modern warfare. Similar tactics were later used during Operation Uranus at the Battle of Stalingrad.

The Soviet–Japanese Neutrality Pact was later signed in April 1941. The decisive Soviet victory altered the eventual course of World War II by dissuading the Empire of Japan from any further confrontation with the Soviet Union under its Hokushin-ron (strike north) doctrine. During World War II, Japan favored the Nanshin-ron (strike south) strategy, attacking Southeast Asia rather than Siberia, eventually leading to the Japanese attack on Pearl Harbor and American entry into World War II in December 1941.

== Background ==
=== Mongolia as a buffer ===
After the Japanese occupation of Manchuria in 1931, Japan turned its military interests to Soviet territories that bordered those areas. Meanwhile, the Soviet Union and the People's Republic of Mongolia signed a Mutual Assistance Pact in March 1936, allowing the former to send troops to Mongolia. In the same year, Japan signed the Anti-Comintern Pact in response. Following Japan's full invasion of China in July 1937, the Soviet Union sent the 57th Special Corps led by Ivan Konev to Mongolia. On 13 June, Genrikh Lyushkov, a Soviet NKVD major general who knew Stalin personally, defected to Japan for fear of the Great Purge. He took with him a large number of secret documents that allegedly revealed the dire situation of the Soviet army in the Far East. The first major Soviet-Japanese border incident, the Battle of Lake Khasan, occurred in 1938 in Primorye. Clashes between Japanese and Soviet forces occurred frequently along the border of Manchuria.

In 1939, Manchuria was a puppet state of Japan known as Manchukuo, and Mongolia was a communist state allied with the Soviet Union, known as the Mongolian People's Republic. The Japanese maintained that the border between Manchukuo and Mongolia was the Khalkhin Gol (English "Khalkha River"), which flows into Lake Buir. In contrast, the Mongolians and their Soviet allies maintained that the border ran 16 kilometres (10 mi) east of the river, just east of Nomonhan.

The principal occupying army of Manchukuo was the Kwantung Army of Japan, which had instructions from the Japanese Cabinet to strengthen and fortify Manchukuo's borders with Mongolia and the Soviet Union. However, the Kwantung Army, which had long been stationed in Manchuria far from the Japanese Home Islands, had become largely autonomous and tended to act without approval from, or even against the direction of, the Japanese government.

== Battles ==
=== May: Skirmishes ===
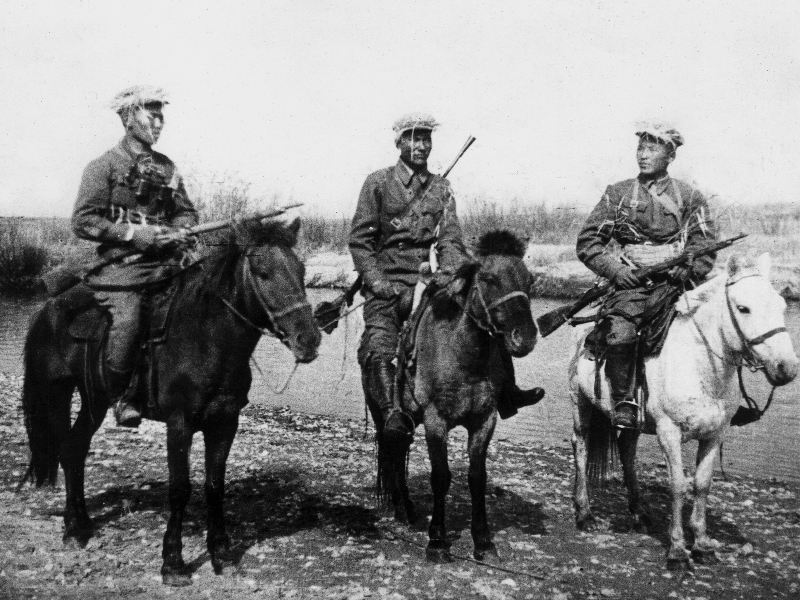
Mongolian cavalry in the Khalkhin Gol (1939)

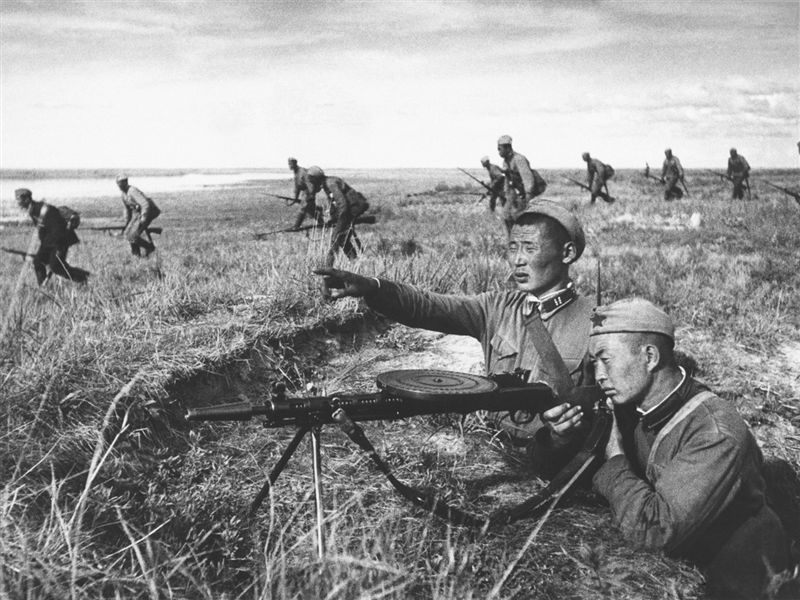
Mongolian troops fight against a Japanese counterattack on the western beach of the river Khalkhin Gol, 1939

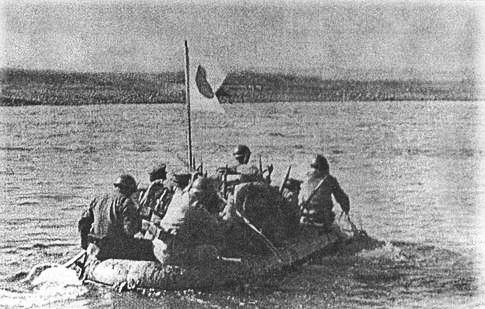
Japanese soldiers cross the Khalkhin Gol

The battles began on 11 May 1939. A Mongolian cavalry unit of 70 to 90 men had entered the disputed area in search of grazing for their horses. On that day, Manchu cavalry attacked the Mongolians and drove them back across the river Khalkhin Gol. On 13 May, the Mongolian force returned in greater numbers and the Manchukoans failed to dislodge them.

On 14 May, Lt. Col. Yaozo Azuma led the reconnaissance regiment of the 23rd Infantry Division, supported by the 64th Infantry Regiment of the same division, under Colonel Takemitsu Yamagata, into the territory, and the Mongolians withdrew. Soviet and Mongolian troops returned to the disputed region however, and Azuma's force again moved to evict them, but the Soviet-Mongolian forces surrounded Azuma's force on 28 May and destroyed it. The Azuma force suffered eight officers and 97 men killed, and one officer and 33 men wounded, for 63% total casualties.

=== June: Escalation ===
Both sides increased their forces in the area. On 5 June, Zhukov, the new corps commander, arrived, and brought more motorized and armored forces (I Army Group) to the combat zone. Accompanying Zhukov was Comcor Yakov Smushkevich with his aviation unit. Zhamyangiyn Lhagvasuren, Corps Commissar of the Mongolian People's Revolutionary Army, was appointed Zhukov's deputy.

On 27 June, the Japanese Army Air Force's 2nd Air Brigade struck the Soviet airbase at Tamsak-Bulak in Mongolia. The Japanese won this engagement, but the strike had been ordered by the Kwantung Army without obtaining permission from Imperial Japanese Army (IJA) headquarters in Tokyo. In an effort to prevent the incident from escalating, Tokyo promptly ordered the JAAF not to conduct any more air-strikes against Soviet airbases.

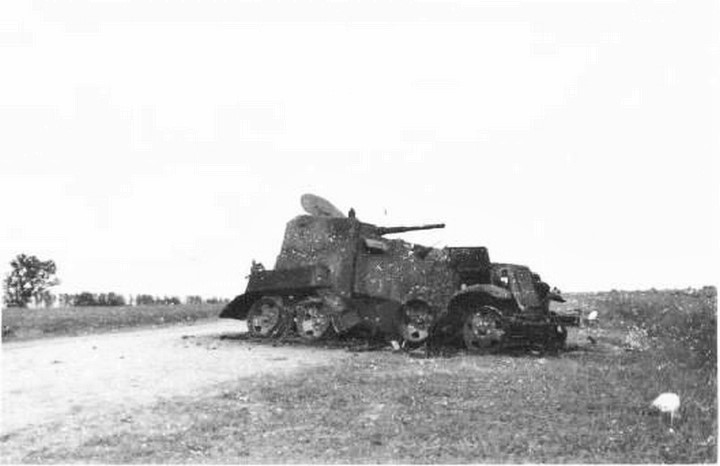
Destroyed Soviet BA-10 armored car

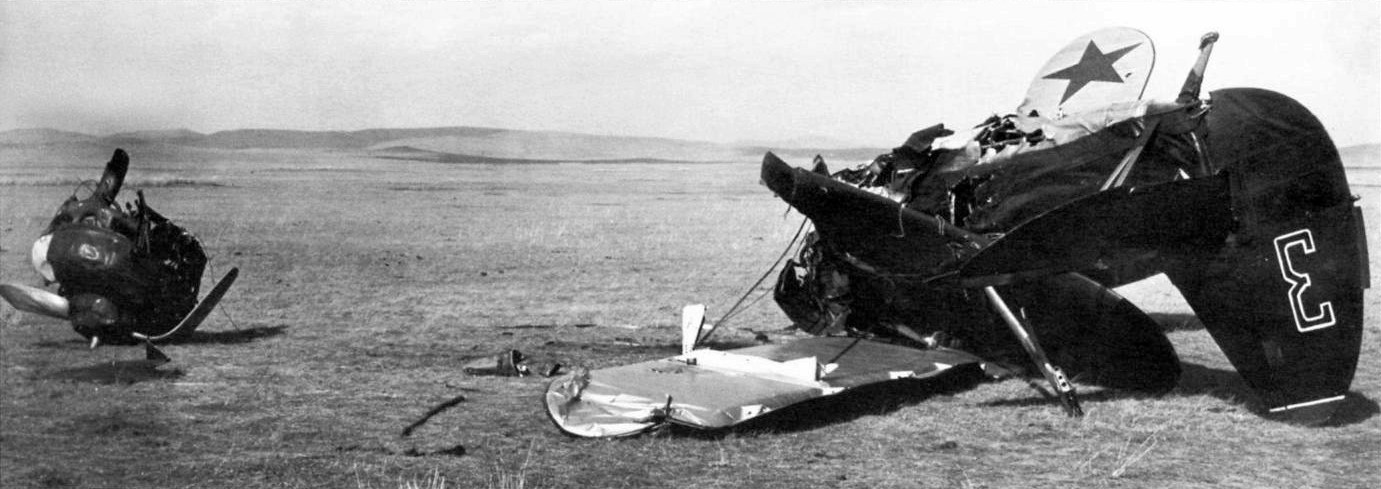
A destroyed Soviet biplane fighter (presumably an I-15 or an I-153)

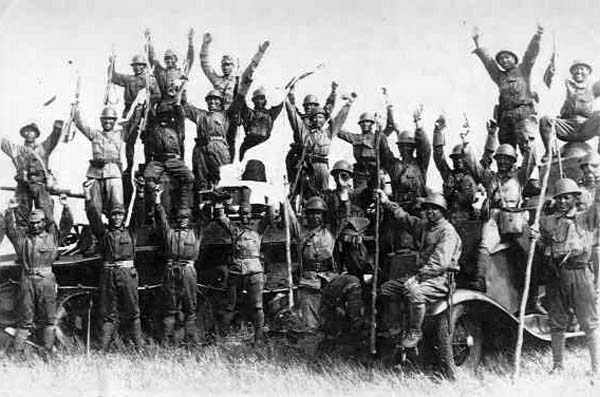
Japanese soldiers cheering alongside captured Soviet AFVs

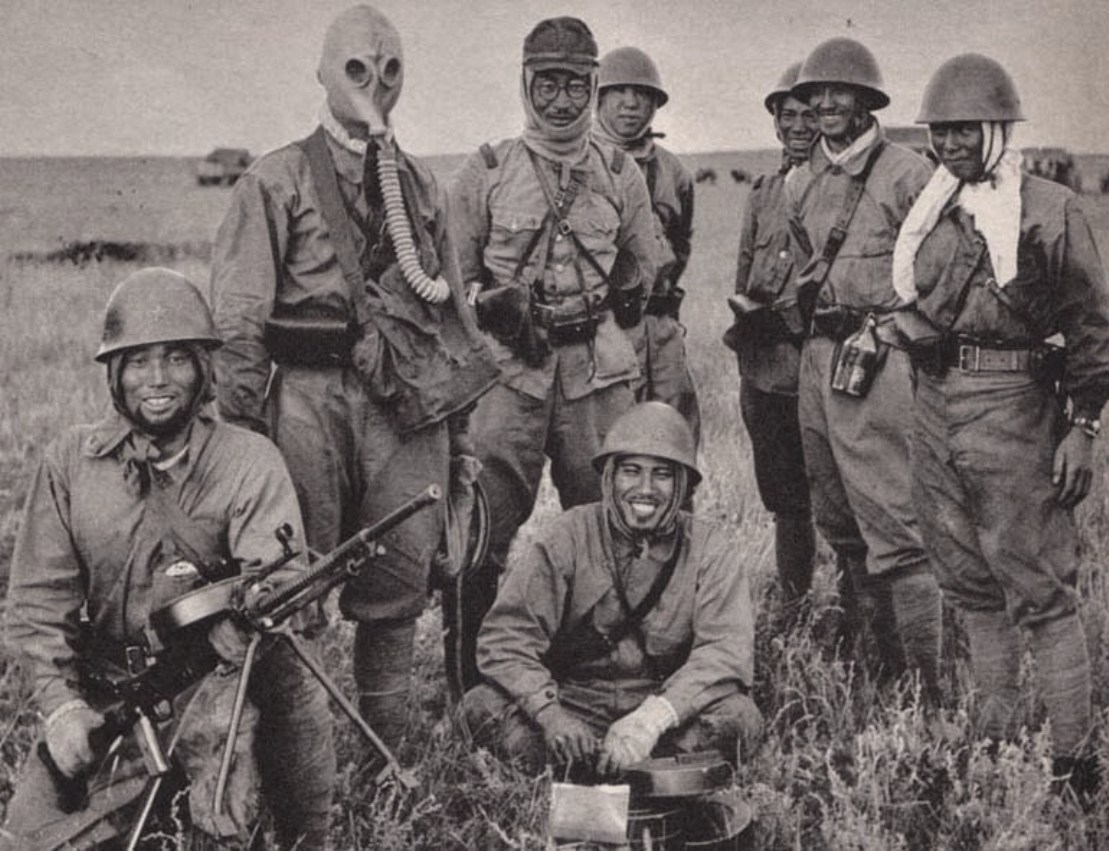
Japanese soldiers posing for a photo with captured Soviet equipment

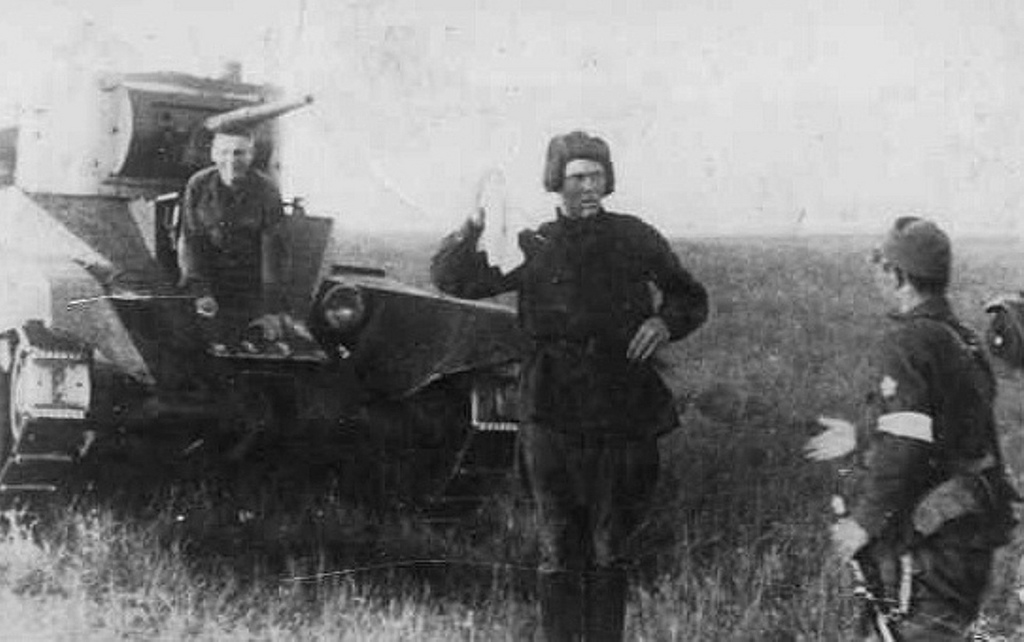
Crew of a BT-5 cavalry tank surrendering to the Japanese

Throughout June, there were reports of Soviet and Mongolian activity on both sides of the river near Nomonhan, and small-scale attacks upon isolated Manchukoan units. At the end of the month, the commander of the 23rd Japanese Infantry Division, Lt. Gen. Michitarō Komatsubara, received permission to "expel the invaders".

=== July: Japanese assault ===
The Japanese planned a two-pronged assault. The first attack would be made by three regiments plus part of a fourth: the 71st and 72nd Infantry Regiment (23rd Division), a battalion of the 64th Infantry Regiment and the 26th Infantry Regiment under Colonel Shinichiro Sumi (7th Infantry Division). This force would advance across the Khalkhin Gol, destroy Soviet forces on Baintsagan Hill on the west bank, then make a left turn and advance south to the Kawatama Bridge. The second prong of the attack would be the task of the IJA 1st Tank Corps (1st TC) (Yasuoka Detachment), consisting of the 3rd and 4th Tank Regiments, plus a part of the 64th Infantry Regiment, a battalion from the 28th Infantry Regiment, detached from the 7th Infantry, 24th Engineer Regiment, and a battalion from the 13th Field-Artillery Regiment, all under the overall command of Lieutenant General Yasuoka Masaomi. This force would attack Soviet troops on the east bank of the Khalkhin Gol and north of the Holsten River. The two Japanese thrusts were to join on the wings. The order of battle was thus:

- Lt. Gen. Yasuoka Masaomi, IJA, Commanding Officer, 1st Tank Corps
  - 3rd Tank Regiment
    - Type 89 I-Go medium tanks – 26
    - Type 97 Chi-Ha medium tanks – 4
    - Type 94 tankettes – 7
    - Type 97 Te-Ke tankettes – 4
  - 4th Tank Regiment
    - Type 95 Ha-Go light tanks – 35
    - Type 89 I-Go medium tanks – 8
    - Type 94 tankettes – 3

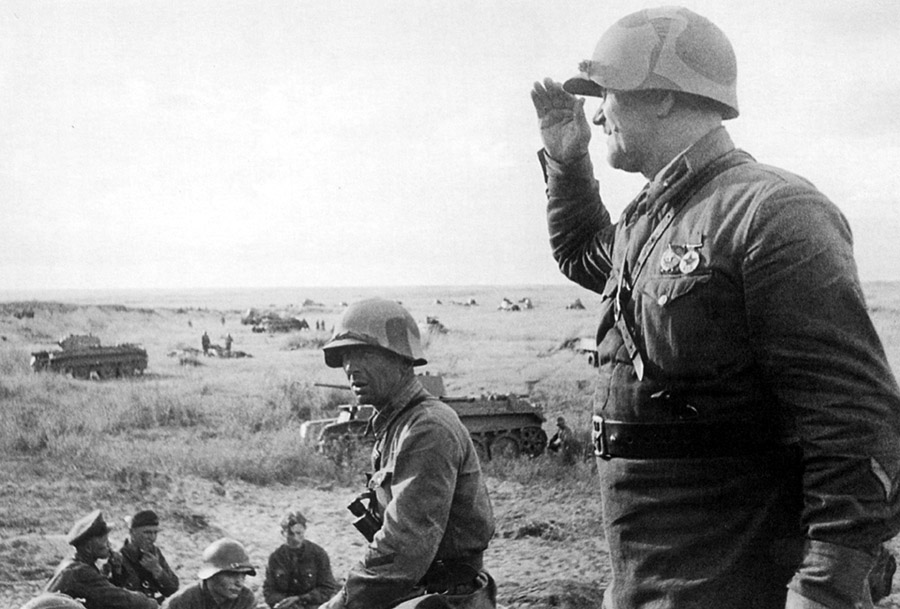
The commander of the Soviet 149th Rifle Regiment before the offensive

The northern task force succeeded in crossing the Khalkhin Gol, driving the Soviets from Baintsagan Hill, and advancing south along the west bank. However, Zhukov, perceiving the threat, launched a counterattack with 450 tanks and armored cars. The tanks consisted primarily of BT tanks with a handful of T-26s, while the armored cars were BA-10s and BA-3/6s, which were similar in armor (6–15 mm (0.24–0.59 in)) and armament (main: 45 mm (2 in) gun 20K mod, secondary: two 7.62 mm (0.30 in) machine guns) to the Soviet light tanks.

The Soviet armored force, despite being unsupported by infantry, attacked the Japanese on three sides and nearly encircled them. The Japanese force, further handicapped by having only one pontoon bridge across the river for supplies, was forced to withdraw, recrossing the river on 5 July.

Meanwhile, the 1st Tank Corps of the Yasuoka Detachment (the southern task force) attacked on the night of 2 July, moving in the darkness to avoid the Soviet artillery on the high ground of the river's west bank. A pitched battle ensued in which the Yasuoka Detachment lost over half its armor, but still could not break through the Soviet forces on the east bank and reach the Kawatama Bridge. After a Soviet counterattack on 9 July threw the battered, depleted Yasuoka Detachment back, it was dissolved and Yasuoka was relieved.

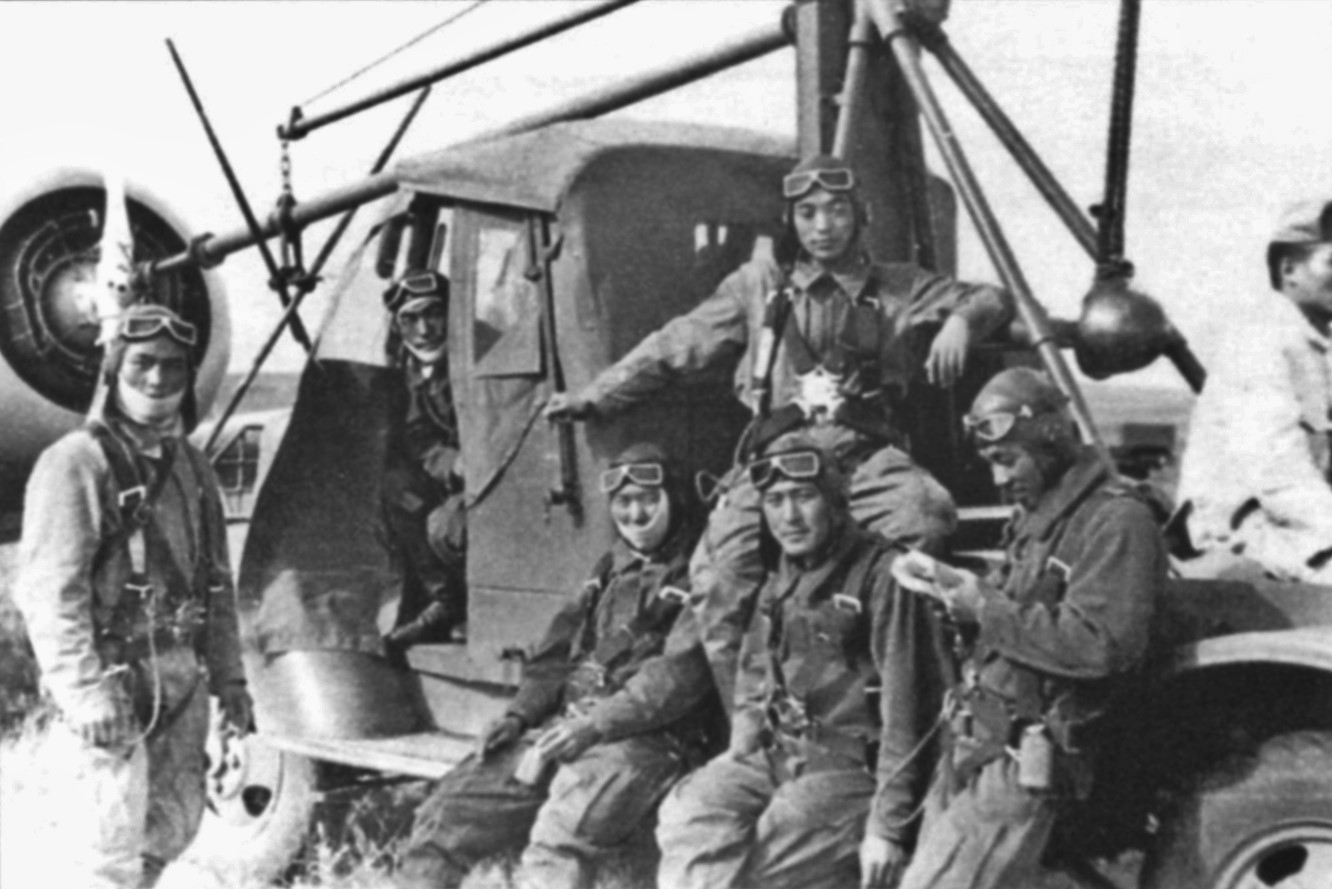
Japanese pilots pictured on a Toyota KC starter truck

The two armies continued to spar with each other over the next two weeks along a four-kilometre (2.5 mi) front running along the east bank of the Khalkhin Gol to its junction with the Holsten River. Zhukov, whose army was 748 km (465 mi) away from its base of supply, assembled a fleet of 2,600 trucks to supply his troops, while the Japanese suffered severe supply problems due to a lack of similar motor transport. In early July the Japanese had only 600 trucks, rising to 1,000 by the end of the month, of which only 75% were operable. By 20 August the Japanese managed to accumulate 2,000 trucks delivering 1,500 tons of supply daily, but even this fell below the Red Army's capabilities.

On 23 July, the Japanese launched another large-scale assault, sending the 64th and 72nd Infantry Regiments against Soviet forces defending the Kawatama Bridge. Over a period of two days, Japanese artillery supported the attack with a massive barrage that consumed more than half of their ammunition stores. The attack made some progress but failed to break through Soviet lines and reach the bridge. The Japanese disengaged from the attack on 25 July due to mounting casualties and depleted artillery stores. By this point they had suffered over 5,000 casualties between late May and 25 July, with Soviet losses being much higher but more easily replaced. The battle drifted into a stalemate.

=== August: Soviet counterattack ===
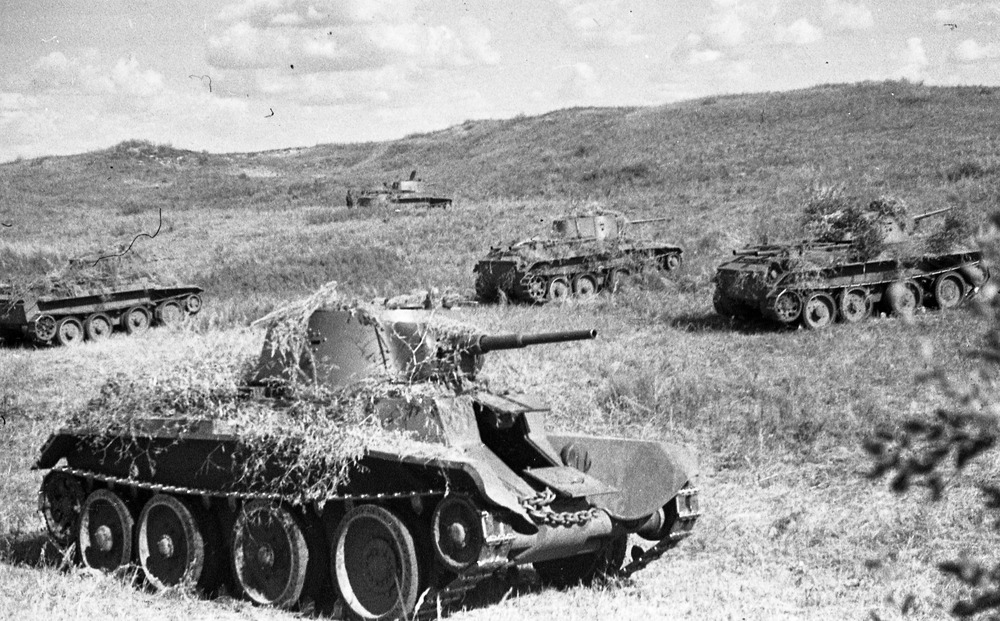
BT-7 Tanks in the Battle of Khalkhin Gol

With war apparently imminent in Europe, and to avoid fighting a two-front war, Zhukov planned a major offensive on 20 August 1939 to clear the Japanese from the Khalkhin Gol region and to end the fighting. Zhukov, using a fleet of at least 4,000 trucks, and transporting supplies from the nearest base in Chita 600 km (370 mi) away, assembled a powerful armored force of three tank brigades (the 4th, 6th, and 11th) and two mechanized brigades (the 7th and 8th, which were armored car units with attached infantry support). This force was allocated to the Soviet left and right wings. The entire Soviet force consisted of three rifle divisions, two tank divisions plus two more tank brigades (in all, around 498 BT-5 and BT-7 tanks), two motorized infantry divisions, and over 550 fighters and bombers. The Mongolians committed two cavalry divisions.

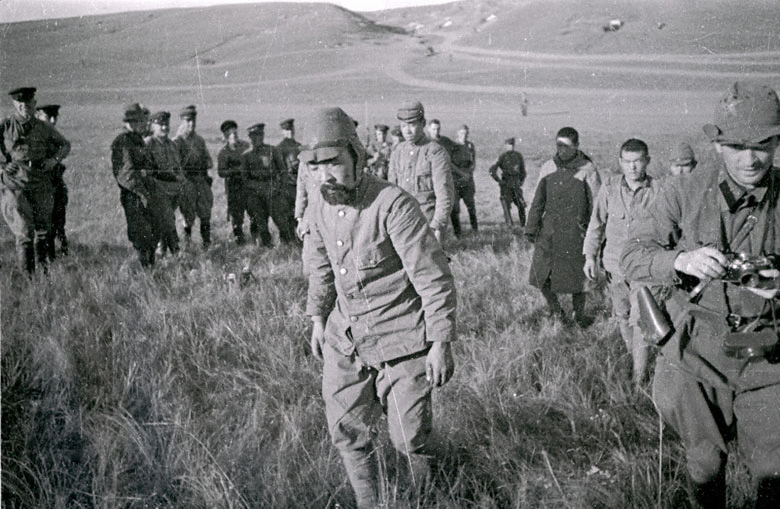
Captured Japanese soldiers

In comparison, at the point of contact, the Kwantung Army had only the 23rd Infantry Division, which, with various attached forces, was equivalent to two light infantry divisions. Its headquarters had been at Hailar, over 150 km (93 mi) from the fighting. Japanese intelligence, despite demonstrating an ability to track the build-up of Zhukov's force, failed to precipitate an appropriate response from below. Thus, when the Soviets finally did launch their offensive, Komatsubara was caught off guard.

To test the Japanese defenses prior to their main assault on 20 August, the Soviets launched three aggressive probing assaults, one on 3 August and the others on 7-8 August. All three were disastrously thrown back, with around 1,000 combined dead and several tanks knocked out on the Soviet side compared to just 85 Japanese casualties. The Japanese counterattacked and routed elements of the Mongolian 8th Cavalry Division, seizing a hilly sector of the battlefront.

Despite the fact that no more major fighting would take place until 20 August, Japanese casualties continued to mount at a rate of 40 wounded per day. Kwantung Army staff officers were becoming increasingly worried over the disorganized state of the 6th Army headquarters and supply elements. The growing casualty count meant that the green 23rd Division would have to take, train and assimilate new replacements "on the job". By contrast, Tokyo's oft-stated desire that it would not escalate the fighting at Khalkhin Gol proved immensely relieving to the Soviets, freed to hand-pick select units from across the military to be concentrated for a local offensive without fear of Japanese retaliation elsewhere.

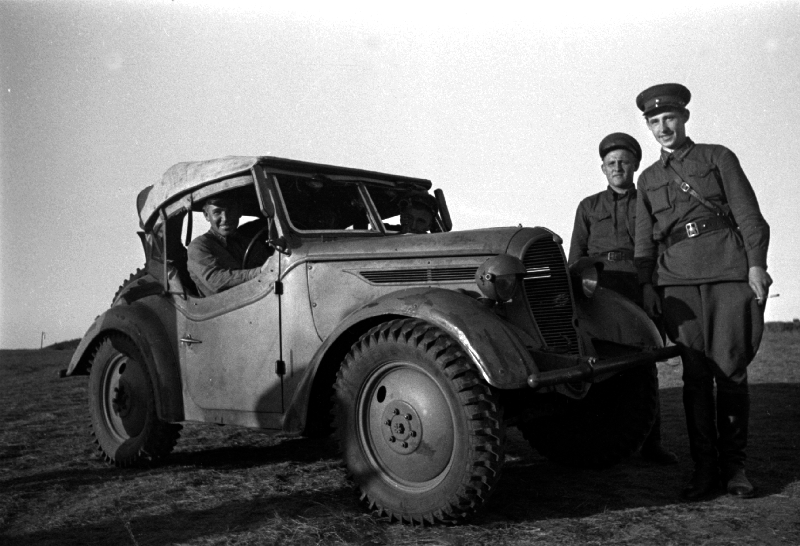
Captured Japanese Type 95 scout car

Zhukov decided it was time to break the stalemate. At 05:45 on 20 August 1939, Soviet artillery and 557 aircraft attacked Japanese positions, the first fighter-bomber offensive in Soviet Air Force history. Approximately 50,000 Soviet and Mongolian soldiers of the 57th Special Corps attacked the east bank of the Khalkhin Gol. Three infantry divisions and a tank brigade crossed the river, supported by massed artillery and by the Soviet Air Force.

Once the Japanese were pinned down by the attack of Soviet center units, Soviet armored units swept around the flanks and attacked the Japanese in the rear, achieving a classic double envelopment. When the Soviet wings linked up by Nomonhan on 25 August, they trapped the Japanese 23rd Infantry Division. On 26 August, a Japanese counterattack to relieve the 23rd Division failed. On 27 August, the 23rd Division attempted to break out of the encirclement but failed. When the surrounded forces refused to surrender, they were again hit with artillery and air attacks. By 31 August, Japanese forces on the Mongolian side of the border were destroyed, leaving remnants of the 23rd Division on the Manchurian side. The Soviets had achieved their objective.

The Soviet Union and Japan agreed to a cease-fire on 15 September; it took effect the following day at 1:10 pm.

== Casualties ==
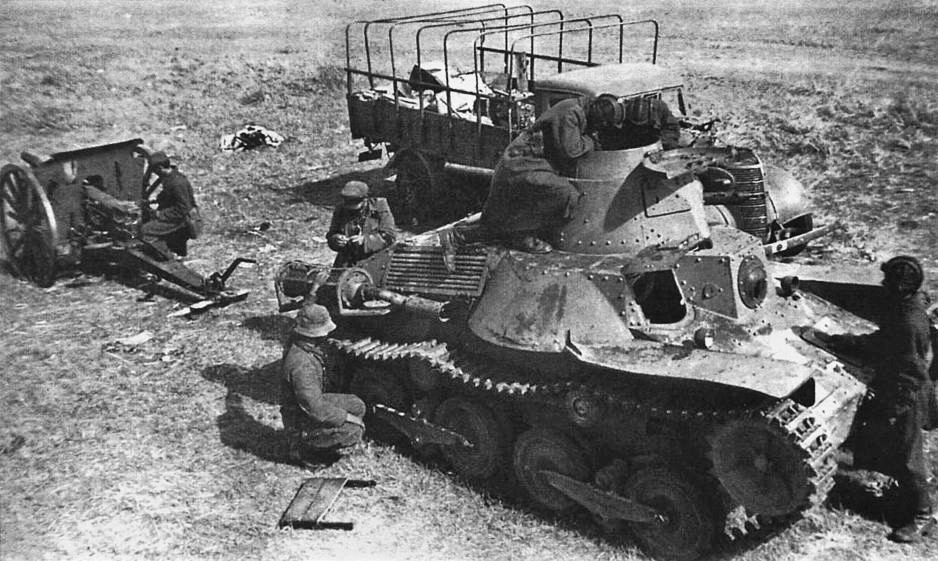
Japanese tank Type 95 Ha-Go captured by Soviet troops after the battle of Khalkhin Gol

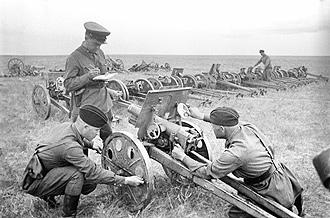
Captured Japanese guns

Japanese military records reported approximately 20,000 battle and non-battle casualties, 162 aircraft lost in combat, and 42 tanks disabled (of which 29 were later repaired and redeployed). Roughly 500 to 600 Japanese and Manchus were taken prisoner. Due to a military doctrine that prohibited surrender, most of these men were listed as killed in action for the benefit of their families. The Soviets initially claimed to have inflicted 29,085 casualties on the Japanese, but later increased this to 52–55,000 and then 61,000 for their official histories.

According to the Sixth Army's medical data, Japanese casualties amounted to 7,696 killed, 8,647 wounded, 1,021 missing, and 2,350 sick, for a total of 19,714 personnel losses. The Kwantung Army headquarters and their internal records gave a slightly different figure of 8,629 killed and 9,087 injured, excluding sick. In November 1939 the American consulate in Harbin claimed to possess "authoritative" information that Japanese casualties reached 30,000, while Agricultural Minister Yukio Sakurauchi reported in October that casualties reached 35–36,000 out of 40,000 participants. In September 1942 the Japanese dedicated a monument to the fallen in the Manchurian theater; of these, 9,471 Japanese and 202 Manchus were attributed to the Nomonhan campaign, an increase of approximately 10 percent over previous totals.

IJA battle casualties for selected periods, Nomonhan campaign

Period	Personnel strength	Battle casualties	Casualties as % of strength
3–4 July	10,000	800	8
7–14 July	15,000	2500	16
23–25 July	22,000	1700	8
1–20 August	22,000	1800	8
21–31 August	25,000	8500	34
Total	–	15,300	–

Zhukov reported Soviet casualties during the final offensive (beginning 20 August) as 9,284, including 1,701 dead & missing and 7,583 wounded. In 1993, Grigoriy Krivosheev cited totals of 7,974 killed and 15,251 wounded for the entire campaign. In the 2001 edition of Krivosheev's work, revised figures of 9,703 dead & missing, 15,251 wounded, and 701 sick are given, for a total of 25,655. Of the dead, 6,472 were killed in action or died of wounds during evacuation, 1,152 died of wounds in hospitals, eight died of disease, 2,028 were missing, and 43 died from non-combat causes. Historian Boris Sokolov has cited a higher number of sick, 2,225, writing that the lower number of 701 only reflects patients who were treated in the Trans-Baikal Military district.

In addition to their personnel losses, the Soviets lost a large amount of equipment including 253 tanks, 250 aircraft (including 208 in combat), 96 artillery pieces, and 133 armored cars. Of the Soviet tank losses, 75–80% were destroyed by anti-tank guns, 15–20% by field artillery, 5–10% by infantry-thrown incendiary bombs, 2–3% by aircraft, and 2–3% by hand grenades and mines. The large number of Soviet armor casualties is reflected in the manpower losses for Soviet tank crews. A total of 1,559 Soviet "Tank Troops" were killed or wounded during the battles.

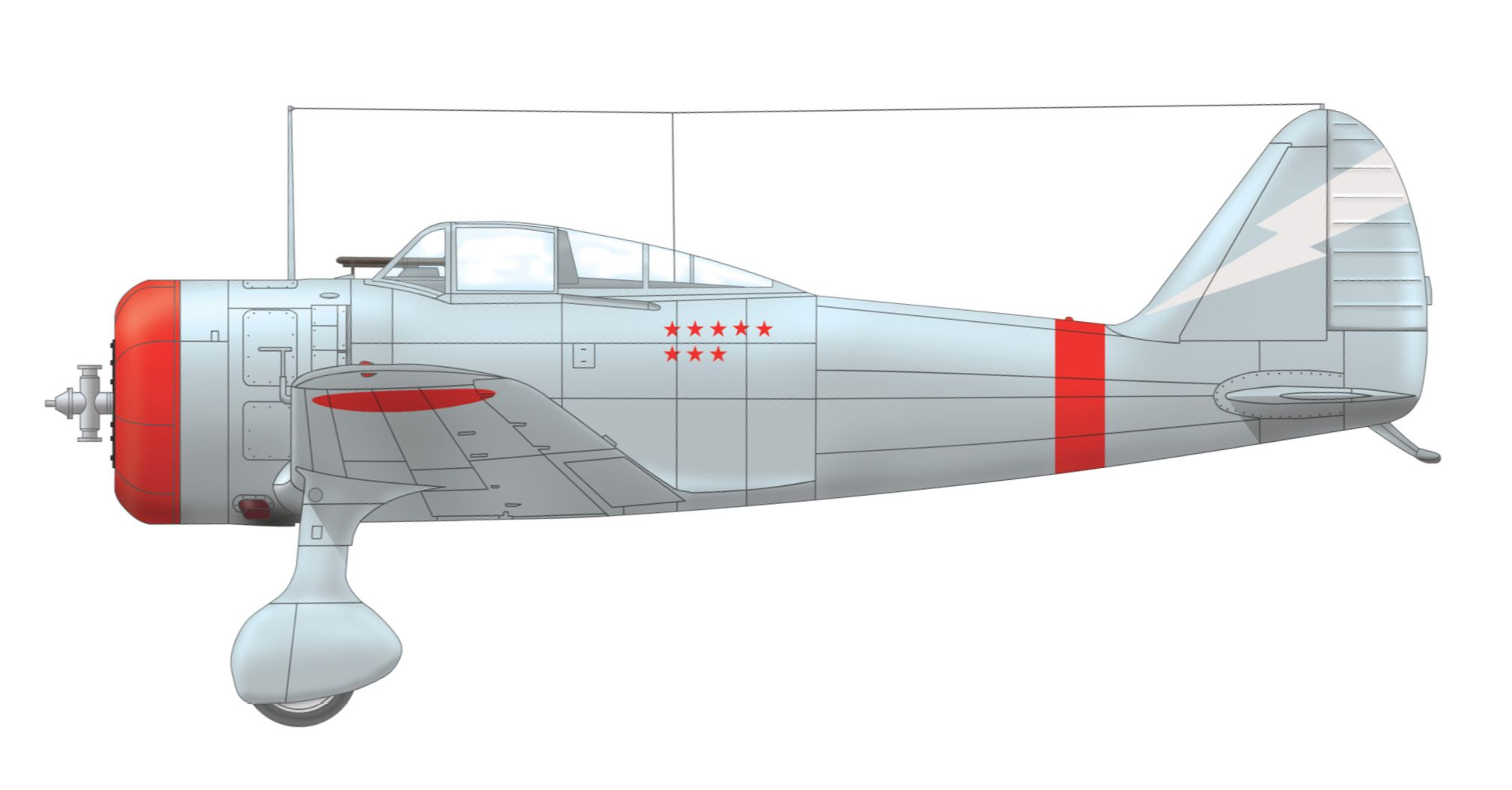
Nakajima Ki-27b of Kenji Shimada, commander of the 1st Chutai of the 11th Sentai, battle of Khalkhin Gol, June 1939

Mongolian casualties were 556–990, including 280 killed and 710 wounded. At least 11 armored cars were destroyed and 1,921 horses and camels were lost.

Nomonhan was the first use of airpower on a massive scale in a high-intensity battle to obtain a specific military objective. The combatants remained at peace until August 1945, when the Soviet Union declared war on Japan and invaded Manchukuo and other territories after the atomic bombing of Hiroshima.

== Air combat ==
=== Soviet aircraft strength ===
Date	I-16 fighter	I-15 biplane fighter	I-153 biplane fighter	SB high-speed bomber	TB-3 heavy bomber	R-5 reconnaissance aircraft	Total:
27 May	52	49	0	88	0	17	206
22 June	95	56	0	116	0	51	318
20 Aug	223	21	84	181	23	43	623 (incl. 65 additional fighters)
11 Sep	362			166		54	582
Ref:

=== Japanese aircraft strength ===
Date	Fighter	Heavy bomber	Light bomber	Reconnaissance	Total:
27 May	40	12	6	6	64
20 June	77	24	6	12	119
23 July	86	9	29	24	148
21 Aug	88	12	24	21	145
13 Sep	158	13	66	18	255
Ref:

=== Soviet aircraft losses ===
Type	I-16 fighter	I-15 biplane fighter	I-153 biplane fighter	SB high-speed bomber	TB-3 heavy bomber	R-5 reconnaissance aircraft	Total:
Combat losses	87	60	16	44	0	1	208
Non-Combat losses	22	5	6	8	1	0	42
Total losses	109	65	22	52	1	1	250
Ref

=== Japanese aircraft losses ===
Type	Ki-4 reconnaissance aircraft	Ki-10 biplane fighter	Ki-15 reconnaissance	Ki-21 high speed bomber	Ki-27 fighter	Ki-30 light bomber	Ki-36 utility aircraft	Fiat BR.20 medium bomber	Transport aircraft	Total
Aerial combat losses	1	1	7	3	62	11	3	0	0	88
Write-offs due to combat damage	14	0	6	3	34	7	3	1	6	74
Total combat losses	15	1	13	6	96	18	6	1	6	162
Combat damage	7	4	23	1	124	33	6	20	2	220
Ref

=== Aircraft losses summary and notes ===
Combat losses include aircraft shot down during aerial combat, written off due to combat damage or destroyed on the ground.

Non-combat losses include aircraft that were lost due to accidents, as well as write-offs of warplanes due to the end of their service life. Thus Soviet combat losses amount to 163 fighters, 44 bombers, and a reconnaissance aircraft, with a further 385 fighters and 51 bombers requiring repairs due to combat damage. VVS (Soviet Air Forces) personnel losses were 88 killed in aerial combat, 11 killed by anti-aircraft artillery, 65 missing, six killed in air strikes and four died of wounds (174 total) and 113 wounded. The Japanese combat losses were 97 fighters, 25 bombers and 41 other (mostly reconnaissance), while 128 fighters, 54 bombers and 38 other required repairs due to combat damage. The Japanese Air Force suffered 152 dead and 66 severely wounded.

=== Aircraft ordnance expenditures ===
USSR: Bomber sorties 2,015; fighter sorties 18,509; 7.62 mm machine gun rounds fired 1,065,323; 20 mm (0.80 in) cannon rounds expended 57,979; bombs dropped 78,360 (1,200 tons).

Japan: Fighter/bomber sorties 10,000 (estimated); 7.7 mm (0.30 in) machine gun rounds fired 1.6 million; bombs dropped 970 tons.

== Summary ==
North Strike Group plans

While this engagement is little known in the West, it played an important part in subsequent Japanese conduct in World War II. The battle earned the Kwantung Army the displeasure of officials in Tokyo, not so much due to its defeat, but because battles were initiated and escalated without direct authorization from the Japanese government. This defeat combined with the Chinese resistance in the Second Sino-Japanese War, together with the signing of the German-Soviet non-aggression pact (which deprived the Army of the basis of its war policy against the USSR), moved the Imperial General Staff in Tokyo away from the policy of the North Strike Group favored by the Army, which wanted to seize Siberia for its resources as far as Lake Baikal.

Instead, support shifted to the South Strike Group, favored by the Navy, which wanted to seize the resources of Southeast Asia, especially the petroleum and mineral-rich Dutch East Indies. Masanobu Tsuji, the Japanese colonel who had helped instigate the Nomonhan incident, was one of the strongest proponents of the attack on Pearl Harbor. General Ryūkichi Tanaka, Chief of the Army Ministry's Military Service Bureau in 1941, testified after the war that "the most determined single protagonist in favor of war with the United States was Tsuji Masanobu". Tsuji later wrote that his experience of Soviet fire-power at Nomonhan convinced him not to attack the Soviet Union in 1941.

On 24 June 1941, two days after the war on the Eastern Front broke out, the Japanese army and navy leaders adopted a resolution "not intervening in German-Soviet war for the time being". In August 1941, Japan and the Soviet Union reaffirmed their neutrality pact. The United States and Britain had imposed an oil embargo on Japan, threatening to stop the Japanese war effort, but the European colonial powers were weakening and suffering early defeats in the war with Germany; only the US Pacific Fleet stood in the way of seizing the oil-rich Dutch East Indies. Because of this, Japan's focus was ultimately directed to the south, leading to its decision to launch the attack on Pearl Harbor on 7 December of that year.

Despite plans being made for a potential war against the USSR (particularly contingent on German advances towards Moscow), the Japanese never launched an offensive against the Soviet Union. In 1941, the two countries signed agreements respecting the borders of Mongolia and Manchukuo and pledging neutrality towards each other. In the closing months of World War II, the Soviet Union annulled the Neutrality Pact and invaded the Japanese territories in Manchuria, northern Korea, and the southern part of Sakhalin Island.

=== Soviet assessment ===
Following the battle, the Soviets generally found the results unsatisfactory, despite their victory. Though the Soviet forces in the Far East in 1939 were not plagued by fundamental issues to the same extent as those in Europe during the 1941 campaigns, their generals were still unimpressed by their army's performance. As noted by Pyotr Grigorenko, the Red Army went in with a very large advantage in technology, numbers and firepower, yet still suffered huge losses, which Grigorenko blamed on poor leadership.

The battle was the first victory for the soon-to-be-famous Soviet general Zhukov, earning him the first of his four Hero of the Soviet Union awards. The two other generals, Grigori Shtern and Yakov Smushkevich, had important roles and were also awarded the Hero of the Soviet Union. They would, however, both be executed in the 1941 Purges. Zhukov himself was promoted and transferred west to the Kiev district.

The battle experience gained by Zhukov was put to good use in December 1941 at the Battle of Moscow. Zhukov used his experience to launch the first successful Soviet counteroffensive against the German invasion. Many units of the Siberian and other trans-Ural armies were part of this attack, and the decision to move these divisions from Siberia was aided by the Soviet spy Richard Sorge in Tokyo, who alerted the Soviet government that the Japanese were looking south and were unlikely to launch another attack against Siberia in the immediate future.

A year after defending Moscow against the advancing Germans, Zhukov planned and executed the Red Army's offensive, i.e. Operation Uranus, at the Battle of Stalingrad, using a technique very similar to Khalkhin Gol, in which the Soviet forces held the enemy fixed in the center, built up an undetected mass force in the immediate rear area, and launched a pincer attack on the wings to trap the German army.

Although their victory and the subsequent negotiation of the Soviet–Japanese Neutrality Pact secured the Far East for the duration of the Soviet-German War, the Red Army always remained cautious about the possibility of another, larger Japanese incursion as late as early 1944. In December 1943, when the American military mission proposed a logistics base be set up east of Lake Baikal, the Red Army authorities were, according to Coox, "shocked by the idea and literally turned white".

The Red Army kept a large force in the Far East even during the bleakest days of the war in Europe. For example, on 1 July 1942, Soviet forces in the Far East consisted of 1,446,012 troops, 11,759 artillery pieces, 2,589 tanks and self-propelled guns, and 3,178 combat aircraft. Despite this, the Soviet operations chief of the Far Eastern Front, General A. K. Kazakovtsev was not confident in his army group's ability to stop an invasion if the Japanese committed to it (at least in 1941–1942), commenting: "If the Japanese enter the war on Hitler's side ... our cause is hopeless."

=== Japanese assessment and reforms ===
The Japanese similarly considered the result not a failing of tactics, but one that simply highlighted a need to address the material disparity between themselves and their neighbours. They made several reforms as a result of this battle: Tank production was increased from 500 annually to 1,200 in 1939. A mechanized headquarters was established in early 1941, and the new Type 1 47 mm anti-tank gun was introduced as a response to the Soviet 45 mm. These cannons were mounted on Type 97 Chi-Ha tanks, resulting in the Type 97 ShinHoTo Chi-Ha ("New Turret") variant, which became the IJA's standard medium tank by 1942.

IGHQ also dispatched General Tomoyuki Yamashita to Germany in order to learn more about tank tactics, following the crushingly one-sided Battle of France and the signing of the Tripartite Pact. He returned with a report where he stressed the need for mechanization and more medium tanks. Accordingly, plans were put underway for the formation of 10 new armoured divisions in the near future.

Despite all of the above, Japanese industry was not productive enough to keep up with either the United States or the Soviet Union, and Yamashita warned against going to war with them for this reason. His recommendations were not taken to heart, and Japanese militarists eventually successfully pushed for war with the United States. In spite of their recent experience and military improvements, the Japanese generally continued to underestimate their adversaries, emphasizing the courage and determination of the individual soldier as a way to make up for their lack of numbers and smaller industrial base. To varying degrees, the basic problems that faced them at Khalkhin Gol would haunt them again when the Americans and British recovered from their defeats of late 1941 and early 1942 and turned to the conquest of the Japanese Empire.

Also, events exposed a severe lack of procedures for emergency stanching of bleeding. The original Japanese doctrine explicitly forbade first aid to fellow soldiers without prior orders from an officer, and first-aid training was lacking. As a result, a large proportion of Japanese dead was due to hemorrhaging from untreated wounds. Furthermore, up to 30% of the total casualties were due to dysentery, which the Japanese believed was delivered by Soviet biological warfare aerial bombs. To reduce susceptibility to diseases, future Japanese divisions commonly included specialized Epidemic Prevention and Water Purification Departments. Finally, the Japanese food rations were found to be unsatisfactory, both in packing and in nutritional value.

== Legacy ==
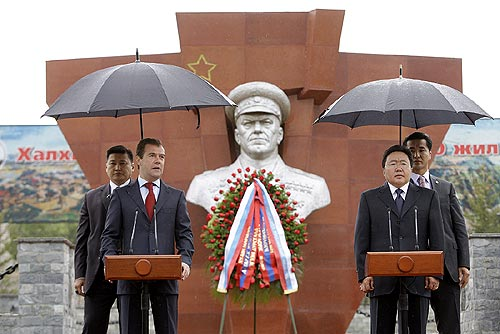
Russian president Dmitry Medvedev and Mongolian president Tsakhiagiin Elbegdorj standing in front of a statue of Zhukov at a ceremony in Ulaanbaatar in August 2009, commemorating the 70th anniversary of the battle

After the Second World War, at the International Military Tribunal for the Far East, fourteen Japanese were charged by delegates of the conquering Soviet Union with having "initiated a war of aggression ... against the Mongolian People's Republic in the area of the Khalkhin-Gol River" and also with having waged a war "in violation of international law" against the USSR. Kenji Doihara, Hiranuma Kiichirō and Seishirō Itagaki were convicted on these charges.

=== Commemoration ===
The anniversary of the battle was first celebrated in the Soviet Union in 1969, on the occasion of its 30th anniversary. After its 50th anniversary, in 1989, it dwindled in importance, going down to the level of academic debates and lectures. Only recently has the anniversary made a resurgence as an important event in Mongolian history.

The Mongolian town of Choibalsan, in the Dornod Province, where the battle was fought, is the location of the "G. K. Zhukov Museum", dedicated to Zhukov and the 1939 battle. Ulaanbaatar also has a "G. K. Zhukov Museum" with information about the battle. The latter museum was opened on 19 August 1979 in the presence of Yumjaagiin Tsedenbal and Zhukov's three daughters. During the 70th, 75th, 80th, and 85th anniversaries of the battle in 2009, 2014, 2019, and 2024, respectively, the president of Russia took part in the celebrations alongside the president of Mongolia and Soviet and Mongolian veterans, with the celebration often coinciding with a state visit.

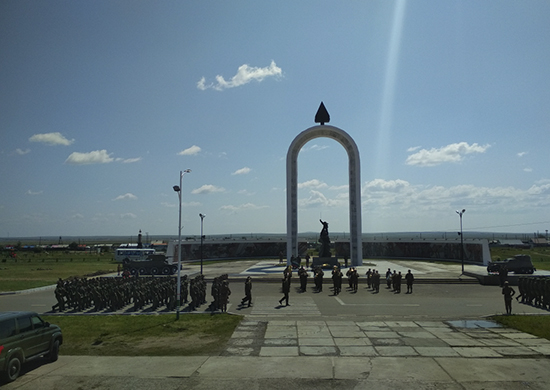
Troops of the Mongolian Armed Forces during the 80th anniversary parade in 2019

On the 80th anniversary, in 2019, a military parade was held in Choibalsan on Independence Square, which featured tactical formations of the Russian Armed Forces' Eastern Military District and the Mongolian Armed Forces, all of whom were participants in the joint Russian-Mongolian military exercises "Selenga-2019" the previous month. Parades were held in the federal subjects of Russia that surround and have a close relationship with Mongolia, such as Buryatia, Yakutia and the Altai Republic. In the Buryat capital of Ulan-Ude, a parade was held in the capital. In addition, a concert on Sükhbaatar Square took place on 28 August, during which the Russian Alexandrov Ensemble together with the Mongolian singers gave a performance.

== See also ==
- Mukden Incident
- Tientsin incident
- Kantokuen
- Mongolia in World War II
