= Type 94 37 mm anti-tank gun =

Type 94 37 mm quick-firing gun
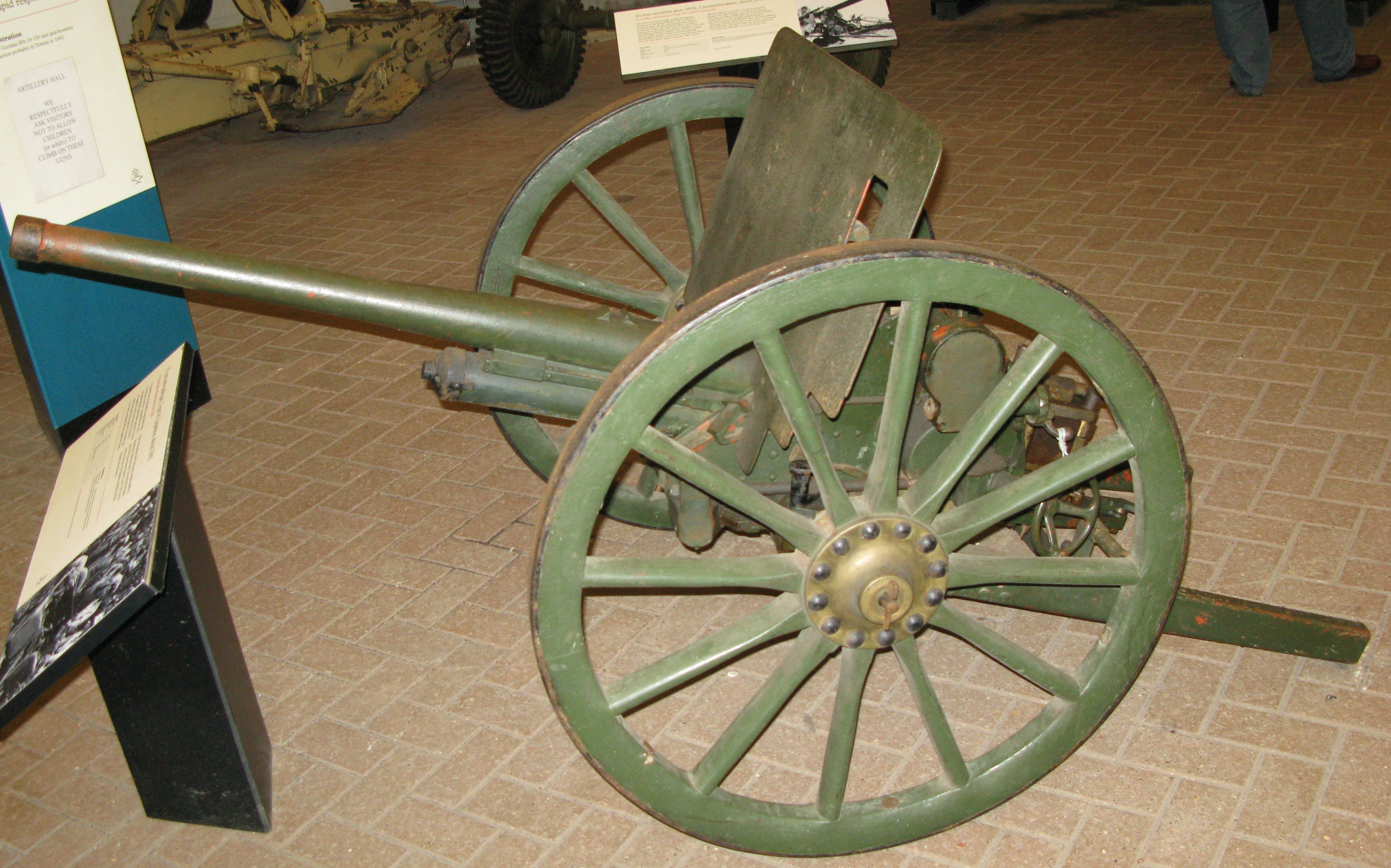
- Type 94 37 mm AT gun at Royal Armouries at Fort Nelson, Hampshire, England
- Type: Anti-tank gun Quick-firing gun
- Place of origin: Empire of Japan

Service history
- In service: 1936–1945
- Used by: Imperial Japanese Army, North Vietnam
- Wars: Second Sino-Japanese War, Soviet-Japanese Border Wars, World War II, First Indochina War

Production history
- Unit cost: 8,400 yen ($2,257 USD) in August 1939 ($51,029 USD in 2024)
- Produced: 1936-1941
- No. built: 3,400

Specifications
- Mass: 324 kg (714 lb) approx
- Length: 2.9 m (9 ft 6 in)
- Barrel length: 1.765 m (5 ft 9 in) L/46.1
- Width: 1.19 m (3 ft 11 in)
- Shell: Fixed QF 37×165 mm. R
- Shell weight: .69 kg (1 lb 8 oz)
- Caliber: 37 mm (1.45 in)
- Breech: Sliding horizontal breech
- Elevation: -10° to +25°
- Traverse: 60°
- Rate of fire: 30 rpm
- Muzzle velocity: 700 m/s (2,300 ft/s)
- Effective firing range: 2,870 m (3,140 yd)
- Maximum firing range: 4,500 m (4,900 yds)
- Sights: straight telescopic

The Type 94 37 mm quick-firing gun (九四式三十七粍速射砲, Kyūyon-shiki sanjyūnana-miri sokushahō) was an anti-tank gun developed by the Imperial Japanese Army. It was used in combat during the Second Sino-Japanese War and World War II. The Type 94's number was designated for the year the gun was accepted, 2594 in the Japanese imperial year calendar, or 1934 in the Gregorian calendar.

== History and development ==
The Type 94 37-mm AT gun was introduced in 1936. The design originated as an improvement to the Type 11 37 mm infantry gun, which was also used as a primitive anti-tank weapon. However, its short bore, low muzzle velocity, short range and slow reloading time gave it a limited capacity against enemy armor. Development of a replacement began in July 1933 and was completed a year later. Initial testing indicated that a trained crew could fire up to 30 rounds per minute; however, Army planners felt that the initial design was too heavy. A modified design was tested in 1935, and actual production began in 1936; however, the weapon retained its original “Type 94” (imperial year 2594 = western year 1934) designation. Approximately 3,400 units were produced. It later was developed into the Type 1 37 mm anti-tank gun.

== Design ==
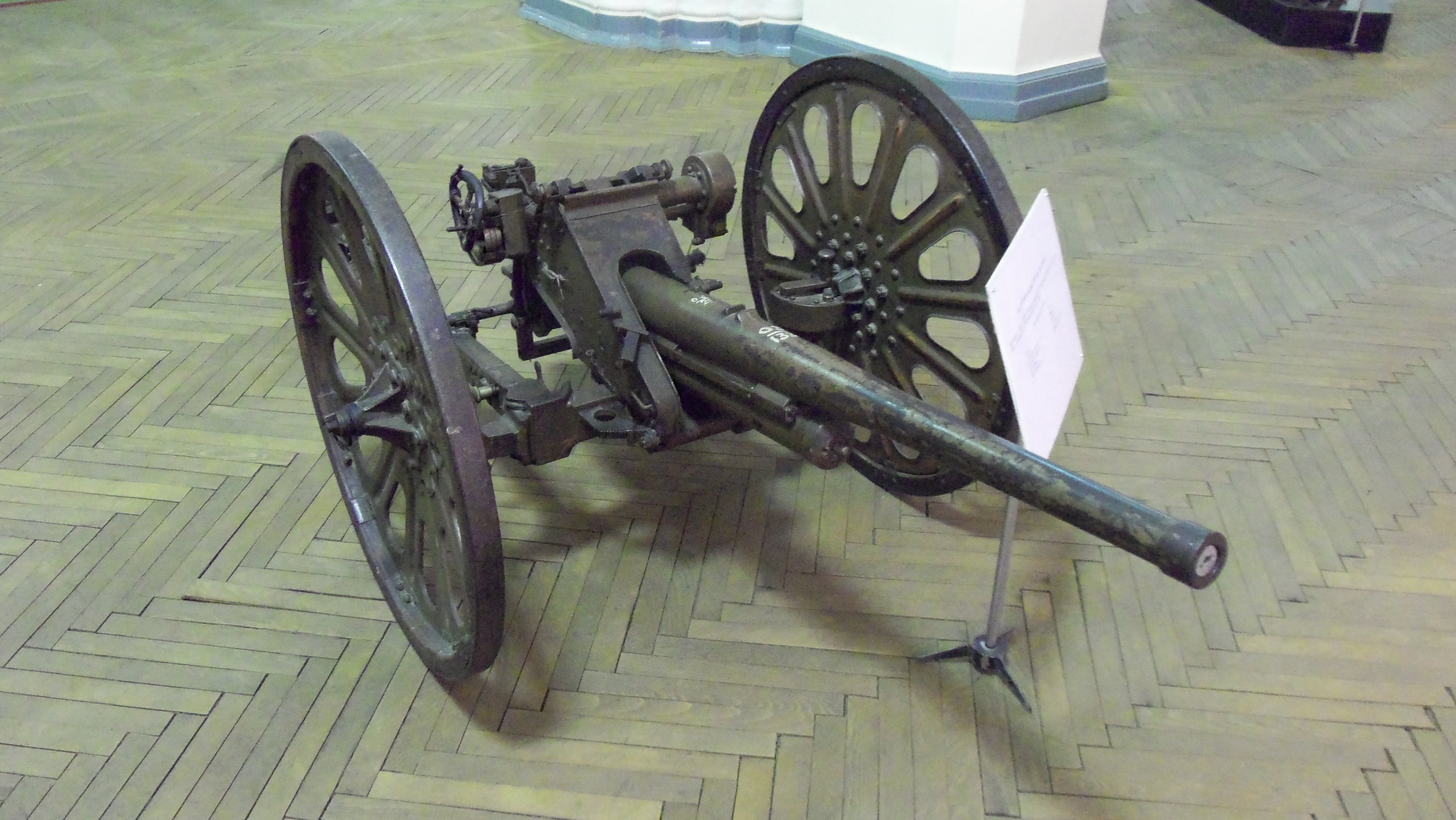
A Type 94 gun in the Military Historical Museum of Artillery, Engineers and Signal Corps in Saint Petersburg, Russia.

As with many Japanese designs, it had a very low profile and was intended to be operated from a squatting or prone position. The gun had a gun shield to protect the gunner and open carriage-style legs which could be spread to improve the stability. The breech had a semi-automatic cartridge case ejection system to improve reloading time. When the shell was loaded, the rear of the cartridge case tripped a catch closing the breechblock. The recoil action of firing opened the breech and extracted the cartridge case.

The carriage was equipped with either wooden spoked or perforated steel wheels, and the whole assembly could be broken down into four pack loads each weighing less than 100 kilograms to permit transport in four horse loads. Sighting was by a straight telescopic sight. The gun could fire either high-explosive or armor-piercing rounds.

== Combat record ==
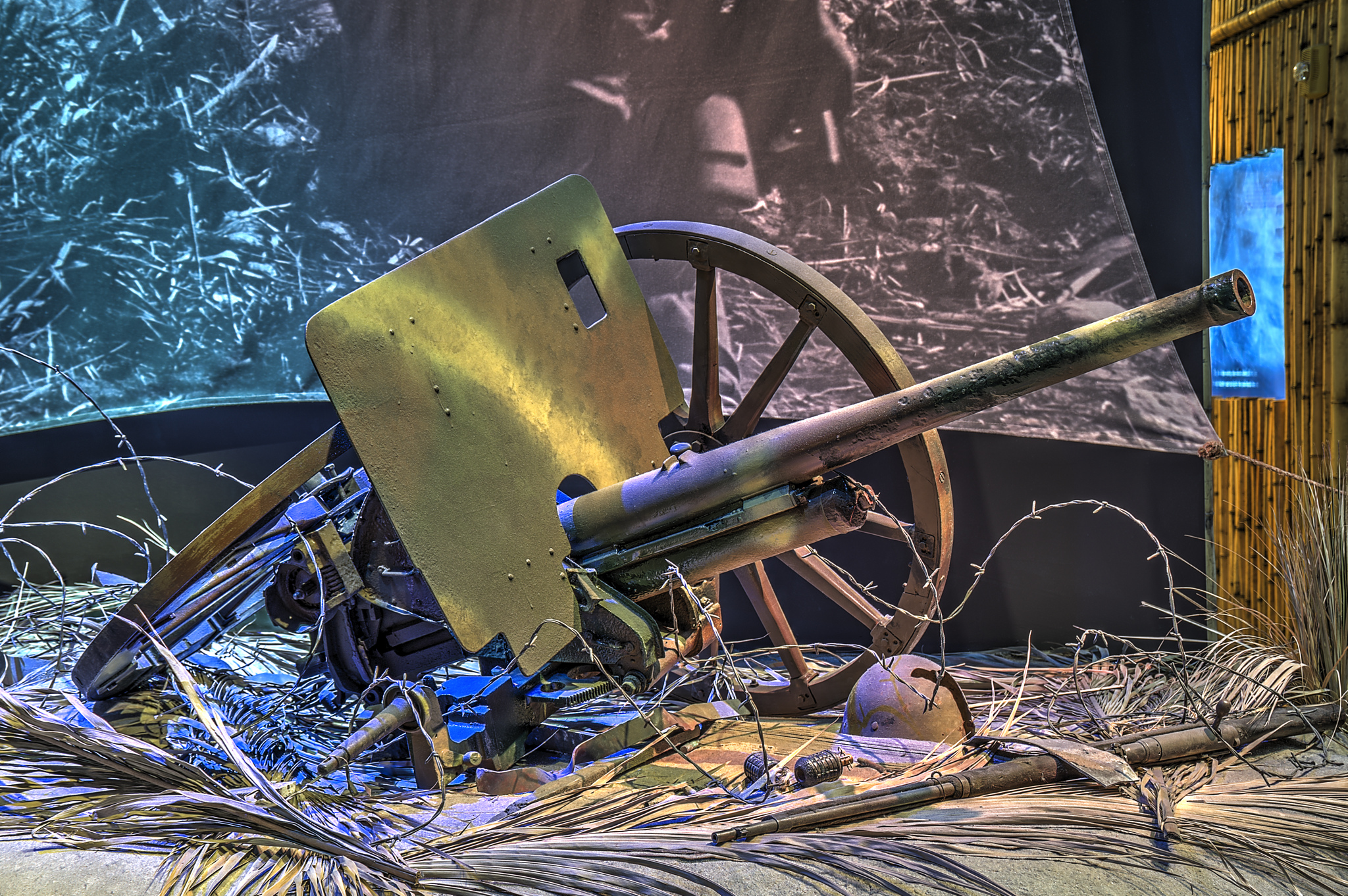
Type 94 gun on display at the American National World War II Museum

The Type 94 37mm AT guns were typically assigned in groups of four to combat infantry regiments. Each weapon was manned by a squad of 11 personnel, and was kept in contact with the regimental headquarters (typically up to 300 meters away) by field telephone or messenger runners. With the standard AP shell, it could penetrate 1.7 inches (43 mm) of armor at 500 yards (460 meters). The Army Technical Bureau continued to experiment with ways to increase muzzle velocity through 1941.

The Type 94 37mm AT gun was effective against Soviet lightly armored BT tanks in the Nomonhan Incident of 1939, but was considered obsolete against more advanced Allied tanks, such as the M4 Sherman, by the start of the Pacific War. However, it remained in service on most fronts in World War II for lack of a better replacement. The Type 1 47 mm anti-tank gun was put into service starting in early 1942, and was intended to replace it, but was never available in large enough numbers to do so completely.

== Surviving examples ==
One of the few remaining Type 94 guns is on display at the Missouri Yacht Club in Lake Lotawana, Missouri.

== Bibliography ==
- Bishop, Chris (eds) The Encyclopedia of Weapons of World War II. Barnes & Nobel. 1998. ISBN 0-7607-1022-8
- Chant, Chris. Artillery of World War II, Zenith Press, 2001, ISBN 0-7603-1172-2
- McLean, Donald B. Japanese Artillery; Weapons and Tactics. Wickenburg, Ariz.: Normount Technical Publications 1973. ISBN 0-87947-157-3.
- Nakanishi, Ritta Japanese Infantry Arms in World War II, Dainipponkaiga Company 1991, ISBN 4-499-22690-2
- US Department of War, TM 30-480, Handbook on Japanese Military Forces, Louisiana State University Press, 1994. ISBN 0-8071-2013-8
- War Department TM-E-30-480 Handbook on Japanese Military Forces September 1944
- "兵器臨時定価、予価、表送付の件 Military catalogue of the Japanese military". National Archives of Japan. Ministry of the Army.
- "Banking and Monetary Statistics, 1914-1941, Part I". Federal Reserve Bank of St. Louis. Board of Governors of the Federal Reserve System (U.S.). January 1943 [1943].
