= Khalkhin Gol =

River in eastern Mongolia and China

Khalkhin Gol Khalkh River, Khalkha River, Ha-la-ha River, Ha-lo-hsin Ho
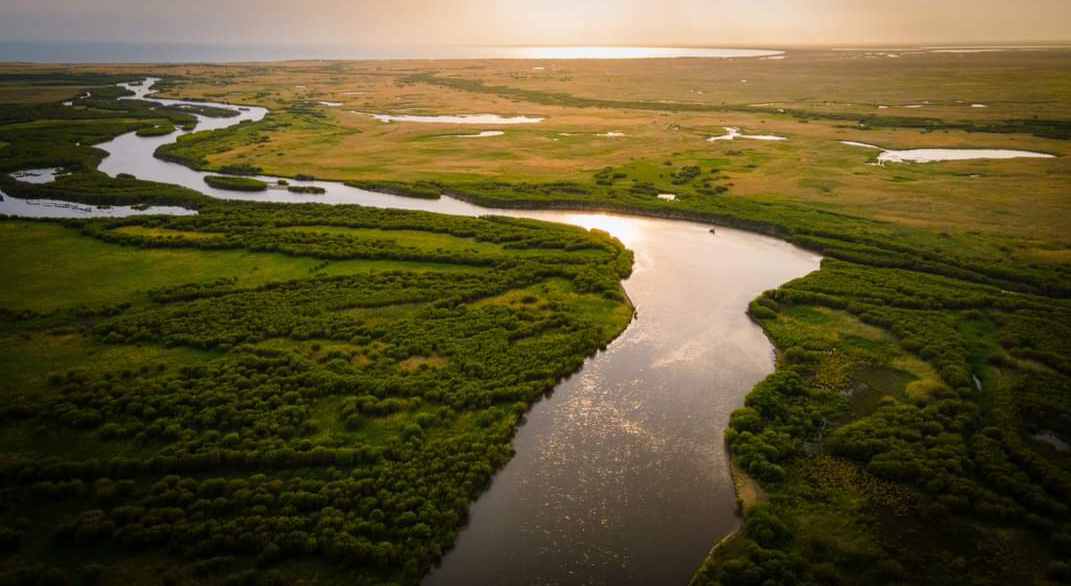

- The Khalkin Gol (Note: In this sketch of the Amur basin, Buir Lake is not shown and Khalhin Gol is sketched as a single channel together with the Orhuun Gol, which splits approximately by the border and flows into the Hulun Lake) is at the far eastern edge of Mongolia in the Amur basin (yellow)
- Native name: Халхын гол (in Mongolian)

Location
- Country: Mongolia
- Mongolian Aimag: Dornod
- Region: Mongolia
- District: Dornod

Physical characteristics
- Source
  - location: People's Republic of China
  - coordinates: 47°04′51″N 120°29′16″E
  - elevation: 1,443 m (4,734 ft)
- Mouth: Buir Lake
  - location: Mongolia
  - coordinates: 47°53′44″N 117°50′08″E
  - elevation: 583.1 m (1,913 ft)
- Length: 233 km (145 mi)
- Basin size: 17,000 km^{2} (6,600 sq mi)
- Discharge
  - average: 25 m^{3}/s (880 cu ft/s)

The Khalkh River (also spelled as Khalkha River or Halaha River; Mongolian: Халх гол; Chinese: 哈拉哈 Ha-la-ha; Ha-lo-hsin Ho) is a river in eastern Mongolia and northern China's Inner Mongolia region. The river is also referred to with the Mongolian genitive suffix -iin as the Khalkhin Gol, or River of Khalkh.

The river's source is the western slopes of the Greater Khingan mountains of Inner Mongolia. In its lower course, it forms the boundary between China's Inner Mongolia, and the Mongolian Republic until around 48.033179°N 118.134290°E, the river splits into two distributaries. The left branch (the Halh River proper) flows into the Buir Lake at 47.895556°N 117.835556°E; discharge from that lake at 47.950011°N 117.814270°E) is known as the Orshuun Gol (Mongolian: Оршуун гол, Chinese: 乌尔逊河; pinyin: Wūěrxùn Hé). The right branch, known as the Shariljiin Gol (Mongolian: Шарилжийн гол) flows directly into the Orshuun Gol at 48.069891°N 117.755433°E. Orhuun connects the Buir Lake with the Hulun Lake. The Chinese–Mongolian border then follows the Shariljiin Gol for about an equal distance.

From May to September 1939, the river was the site of the Battles of Khalkhin Gol, the decisive engagement of the Soviet-Japanese border conflicts. Soviet and Mongolian forces defeated the Japanese Kwantung Army.
