= Masaomi Yasuoka =

Japanese officer (1886–1948)

- 安岡 正臣
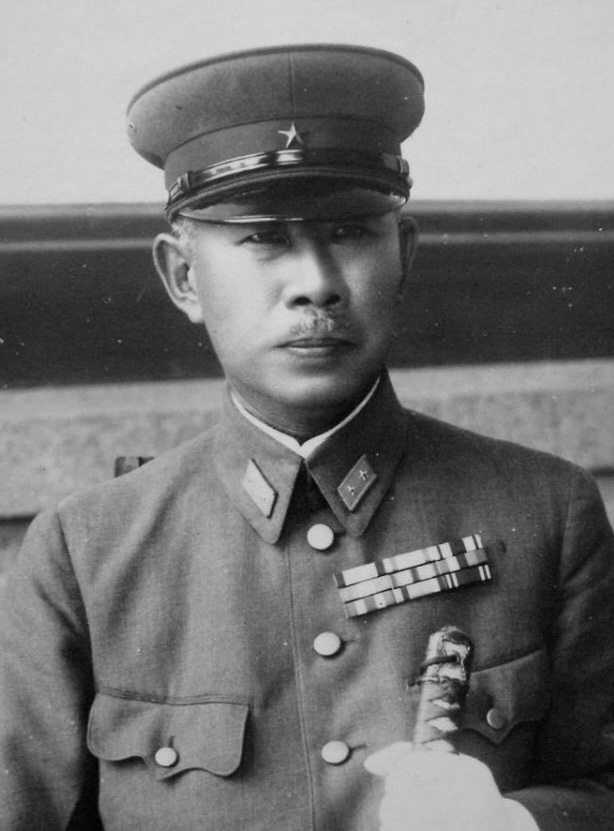

Governor of Surabaya
- In office July 1942 – September 2, 1945
- Monarch: Emperor Hirohito

Personal details
- Born: July 21, 1886 Satsumasendai, Kagoshima, Japan
- Died: April 12, 1948 (aged 61) Surabaya, Netherlands East Indies

Military service
- Allegiance: Empire of Japan
- Branch/service: Imperial Japanese Army
- Years of service: 1906–1945
- Rank: Lieutenant General
- Commands: Yasuoka Detachment
- Battles/wars: Soviet-Japanese Border Wars; World War II

Masaomi Yasuoka (安岡 正臣, Yasuoka Masaomi; 21 July 1886 – 12 April 1948) was a lieutenant general in the Imperial Japanese Army in World War II.

== Biography ==
=== Military career ===
Yasuoka was born in Sendai city, Kagoshima Prefecture (present day Satsumasendai, Kagoshima) and was the son of an officer in the Imperial Japanese Army. After attending military preparatory schools in Kumamoto, he graduated from the 18th class of the Imperial Japanese Army Academy in 1906. After attending the Army Toyama School, he graduated from the 26th class of the Army Staff College in 1914. After serving in a number of staff positions, he was assigned to the IJA 51st Infantry Regiment, rising to become its commander by 1922. He served on the staff of the IJA 9th Division, the IJA 29th Infantry Regiment and the IJA 16th Division and after his promotion to colonel in August 1930, as commander of the IJA 49th Infantry Regiment from 1930. In January 1935, he became Chief of Staff of the Hiroshima-based IJA 5th Division.

Yasuoka was promoted to major general and given command of the IJA 30th Infantry Brigade in March 1935. He served as commandant of the Army Tank School from August 1936. In March 1938, he was promoted to lieutenant general and was made commander of the IJA 1st Independent Mixed Brigade.

With the start of the Soviet-Japanese Border Wars, Yasuoka's expertise in armored warfare was recognized when he was made commander of the Yasuoka Detachment, an armored task force of the Kwantung Army, organized for the July 1939 offensive of the Battle of Khalkhin Gol. However, the Japanese army suffered a ruinous defeat at the hands of the combined Soviet-Mongolian forces and Yasuoka was relieved of command in July 1939 and his detachment was dissolved.

He was placed in command of the reserve IJA Third Depot Division in August 1939, and went into the reserves in March 1941. He retired from the military at the end of the same month.

=== Governor of Surabaya ===
In July 1942, Yasuoka agreed to accept the post of governor of Surabaya in Japanese-occupied Java, Netherlands East Indies. During his time in Surabaya, he learned enough of the Javanese language to be able to make a speech in public, and was known for visiting schools and government offices without notice. He attempted to employ as many native Indonesians in government positions as possible, both from a practical standpoint, but also from a belief that the Netherlands East Indies should be freed from colonial rule. He also released many of the Dutch officials who were held as prisoners of war to train the Indonesians to take their places. He held the post until the surrender of Japan in August 1945, whereupon he was arrested by Dutch colonial authorities and tried before a military tribunal where he was declared guilty of unspecified war crimes. He was condemned to death and hanged on 12 April 1948.
