= Religious and political symbols in Unicode =

Characters representing cultural, political and religious symbols

Unicode contains a number of characters that represent various cultural, political, and religious symbols. Most, but not all, of these symbols are in the Miscellaneous Symbols block.

The majority of them are treated as graphic symbols that are not characters. Exceptions to this include characters in certain writing systems that are also in use as political or religious symbols, such as 卐 (U+5350), the swastika encoded as a Chinese character (although it is also encoded as a religious symbol at U+0FD5); or ॐ (U+0950), the Om symbol which is, strictly speaking, a Devanagari ligature. A special case is ﷲ (U+FDF2), which is a special ligature of Arabic script used only for writing of the word Allah. This ligature is in the Arabic Presentation Forms-A block, which was only encoded for compatibility and is not recommended for use in regular Arabic text.

Unicode defines the semantics of a character by its character identity and its normative properties, one of these being the character's general category, given as a two-letter code (e.g. Lu for "uppercase letter"). Characters that fall in the "political or religious" category are given the "general category" So, which is the catch-all category for "Symbol, other", i.e. anything considered a "symbol" which does not fall in any of the three other categories of Sm (mathematical symbols), Sc (currency symbols) or Sk (phonetic modifier symbols, i.e. IPA signs not considered letters).

== Armenian block ==
The Unicode chart for the Armenian block notes two religious symbols:

Symbol	Code point	Name
֍	U+058D	RIGHT-FACING ARMENIAN ETERNITY SIGN
֎	U+058E	LEFT-FACING ARMENIAN ETERNITY SIGN

== Dingbats block ==
The Dingbats block also contains some symbols with political/religious connotations:

Symbol	Emoji	Code point	Name
✙		U+2719	OUTLINED GREEK CROSS
✚		U+271A	HEAVY GREEK CROSS
✛		U+271B	OPEN CENTER CROSS
✜		U+271C	HEAVY OPEN CENTER CROSS
✝	✝️	U+271D	LATIN CROSS
✞		U+271E	SHADOWED WHITE LATIN CROSS
✟		U+271F	OUTLINED LATIN CROSS
✠		U+2720	MALTESE CROSS
✡	✡️	U+2721	STAR OF DAVID

== Geometric Shapes Extended ==
Other weights of the Greek cross are in Geometric Shapes Extended.

Symbol	Code point	Name
🞡	U+1F7A1	THIN GREEK CROSS
🞢	U+1F7A2	LIGHT GREEK CROSS
🞣	U+1F7A3	MEDIUM GREEK CROSS
🞤	U+1F7A4	BOLD GREEK CROSS
🞥	U+1F7A5	VERY BOLD GREEK CROSS
🞦	U+1F7A6	VERY HEAVY GREEK CROSS
🞧	U+1F7A7	EXTREMELY HEAVY GREEK CROSS
🟙	U+1F7D9	NINE POINTED WHITE STAR (Baháʼí symbol)

== Enclosed Ideographic Supplement block ==
The Unicode chart for the Enclosed Ideographic Supplement block notes several symbols used for Chinese folk religion:

Symbol	Code point	Name and notes
🉠	U+1F260	ROUNDED SYMBOL FOR FU (luck)
🉡	U+1F261	ROUNDED SYMBOL FOR LU (prosperity)
🉢	U+1F262	ROUNDED SYMBOL FOR SHOU (longevity)
🉣	U+1F263	ROUNDED SYMBOL FOR XI (happiness)
🉤	U+1F264	ROUNDED SYMBOL FOR SHUANGXI (double happiness, love and marriage)
🉥	U+1F265	ROUNDED SYMBOL FOR CAI (wealth)

== Miscellaneous Symbols block ==
The Unicode chart for the Miscellaneous Symbols block has a section explicitly labelled "Religious and political symbols":

Text	Emoji	Code point	Name and notes
☦︎	☦️	U+2626	ORTHODOX CROSS
☧		U+2627	CHI RHO → 2CE9 ⳩ coptic symbol khi ro
☨		U+2628	CROSS OF LORRAINE
☩		U+2629	CROSS OF JERUSALEM → 1F70A 🜊 alchemical symbol for vinegar
☪︎	☪️	U+262A	STAR AND CRESCENT
☫		U+262B	FARSI SYMBOL
☬	🪯	U+262C	ADI SHAKTI = Gurmukhi khanda - ਖੰਡਾ
☭		U+262D	HAMMER AND SICKLE
☮︎	☮️	U+262E	PEACE SYMBOL
☯︎	☯️	U+262F	YIN YANG → 0FCA ࿊ Tibetan symbol nor bu nyis -khyil

Elsewhere in the block is:

Text	Emoji	Code point	Name and notes
☸	☸️	U+2638	WHEEL OF DHARMA
♰		U+2670	WEST SYRIAC CROSS
♱		U+2671	EAST SYRIAC CROSS
⛤		U+26E4	PENTAGRAM
⛥		U+26E5	RIGHT-HANDED INTERLACED PENTAGRAM
⛦		U+26E6	LEFT-HANDED INTERLACED PENTAGRAM
⛧		U+26E7	INVERTED PENTAGRAM
⛩	⛩️	U+26E9	SHINTO SHRINE
⛪︎	⛪	U+26EA	CHURCH

The emoji variants are obtained by placing U+FE0F after the symbol. An exception is U+262C ☬ ADI SHAKTI whose emoji form is found at U+1FAAF 🪯 KHANDA, as emoji variants are no longer assigned to existing codepoints starting with Unicode 15.0.

== Miscellaneous Symbols and Pictographs block ==
The Unicode chart for the Miscellaneous Symbols and Pictographs block notes many religious symbols:

Text	Emoji	Code point	Name and notes
📿︎	📿️	U+1F4FF	PRAYER BEADS
🕀		U+1F540	CIRCLED CROSS POMMEE (Orthodox typicon symbol for great feast service)
🕁		U+1F541	CROSS POMMEE WITH HALF-CIRCLE BELOW (Orthodox typicon symbol for vigil service)
🕂		U+1F542	CROSS POMMEE (Orthodox typicon symbol for Polyeleos)
🕃		U+1F543	NOTCHED LEFT SEMICIRCLE WITH THREE DOTS (Orthodox typicon symbol for lower rank feast)
🕄		U+1F544	NOTCHED RIGHT SEMICIRCLE WITH THREE DOTS (Orthodox typicon symbol for lower rank feast)
🕅		U+1F545	SYMBOL FOR MARKS CHAPTER (Orthodox typicon symbol for difficult sections)
🕆		U+1F546	WHITE LATIN CROSS
🕇		U+1F547	HEAVY LATIN CROSS
🕈		U+1F548	CELTIC CROSS
🕉︎	🕉️	U+1F549	OM SYMBOL (generic symbol independent of Devanagari letter U+0950 ॐ DEVANAGARI OM)
🕊︎	🕊️	U+1F54A	DOVE OF PEACE = peace
🕋︎	🕋️	U+1F54B	KAABA
🕌︎	🕌️	U+1F54C	MOSQUE
🕍︎	🕍️	U+1F54D	SYNAGOGUE
🕎︎	🕎️	U+1F54E	MENORAH WITH NINE BRANCHES

Ostensibly religious symbols are, however, not limited to this section, as the same chart has another short section of two characters labelled "Syriac cross symbols", with the explanatory gloss "These symbols are used in liturgical texts of Syriac-speaking churches". Another short section of two symbols is headed "Medical and healing symbols", including U+2624 ☤ Caduceus (cf. U+1F750 🝐 "alchemical symbol for caduceus"), U+2695 ⚕ Staff of Aesculapius, and U+2625 ☥ Ankh, all of which originate in polytheistic religious traditions.

== Symbols and Pictographs Extended-A block ==
The Unicode chart for the Symbols and Pictographs Extended-A block notes one religious symbol":

Text	Emoji	Code point	Name and notes
🪯︎	🪯️	U+1FAAF	KHANDA

== Tibetan block ==
The Unicode chart for the Tibetan block notes several religious symbols and a political symbol:

Symbol	Code point	Name and notes
࿕	U+0FD5	RIGHT-FACING SVASTI SIGN
࿖	U+0FD6	LEFT-FACING SVASTI SIGN
࿗	U+0FD7	RIGHT-FACING SVASTI SIGN WITH DOTS
࿘	U+0FD8	LEFT-FACING SVASTI SIGN WITH DOTS

== Soyombo block ==
The Soyombo symbol is a special character in the Soyombo alphabet devised for the Mongolian language. It appears in several flags of Mongolia. Three forms appear in the Soyombo block.

Symbol	Image	Code point	Name and notes
𑪞		U+11A9E	SOYOMBO HEAD MARK WITH MOON AND SUN AND TRIPLE FLAME • national symbol of Mongolia
𑪟		U+11A9F	SOYOMBO HEAD MARK WITH MOON AND SUN AND FLAME
𑪠		U+11AA0	SOYOMBO HEAD MARK WITH MOON AND SUN

== See also ==
National flags are implemented by Regional indicator symbols in the Enclosed Alphanumeric Supplement block.
