= Soyombo =

Soyombo is derived from the Sanskrit word Svayambhu (meaning "created out of itself") and may refer to:

- Soyombo script, an abugida developed by Zanabazar in 1686 to write Mongolian
- Soyombo symbol, a special character of that script and national symbol of Mongolia
- Soyombo movie theater, a movie theater/cinema of Mongolia
- Soyombo (Unicode block), range of characters defined in the Unicode Standard for the Soyombo script
