= List of Mongolian flags =

This is a list of flags used in Mongolia. For more information about the national flag, see flag of Mongolia.

== National flag ==
Flag	Date	Use	Description
	2011–present	National flag of Mongolia	A vertical triband of red, blue, and red, with a Soyombo symbol centered on the red band at the hoist.

== Province flags ==
Flag	Date	Use	Description
	1995–present	Flag of Ulaanbaatar	A sky blue background and the Khangarid bird in the center.
		Flag of Arkhangai Province	A light blue background with the province's emblem in the hoist.
		Flag of Bayankhongor Province	
		Flag of Bayan-Ölgii Province	A vertical triband of blue, green, and blue, with a yellow crescent in the green band.
	2022–present	Flag of Bulgan Province	A green background with the province's emblem in the center.
		Flag of Darkhan-Uul Province	
		Flag of Dornod Province	
		Flag of Dornogovi Province	
		Flag of DundGobi Province	
		Flag of Govi-Altai Province	
		Flag of Govisümber Province	
		Flag of Khentii Province	
		Flag of Khovd Province	
		Flag of Khövsgöl Province	
		Flag of Orkhon Province	
		Flag of Selenge Province	
		Flag of Sükhbaatar Province	
		Flag of Töv Province	
		Flag of Ömnögovi Province	
		Flag of Uvs Province	
		Flag of Övörkhangai Province	
		Flag of Zavkhan Province	

== Political party flags ==
Flag	Date	Use	Description
	2011–present	Flag of the Mongolian People's Party	
	2026–present	Flag of the Democratic Party	
	2022–present	Flag of the HUN Party	
	2012–present	Flag of the Civil Will–Green Party	
	2005–present	Flag of the Mongolian National Democratic Party	
	1998–present	Flag of the Motherland Party	
	1992–2002	Flag of the Republican Party	
	2004–present	Flag of the Republican Party	
	1990–present	Flag of the Mongolian Green Party	
	1993–present	Flag of the Mongolian Traditional United Party	
	1992–2000	Flag of the Mongolian National Democratic Party	
	2000–2026	Flag of the Democratic Party	
	2000–2012	Flag of the Civil Will Party	
	1990–1992	Flag of the Mongolian Democratic Party	
	2010–2021	Flag of the Mongolian People's Revolutionary Party	

== Military flags ==
Flag	Date	Use	Description
	2014–present	General banner of the Mongolian Armed Forces	
	2017–present	Combat banner of the Mongolian Ground Force	
	2017–present	Combat banner of the Mongolian Air Force	
	2021–present	Flag of the General Staff of the Mongolian Armed Forces	
	2021–present	Flag of the Mongolian Ground Force	
	2021–present	Flag of the Mongolian Air Force	
	2021–present	Flag of the Mongolian Construction and Engineering Force	
	2021–present	Flag of the Mongolian Cybersecurity Force	
	2021–present	Flag of the Mongolian Special Force	

== Sports flags ==
Flag	Date	Use	Description
		Flag of the Mongolian National Olympic Committee	A white flag with the Olympic Rings surmounted by a blue Soyombo symbol.

== Historical flags ==
Flag	Date	Use	Description
	1242–1502	Possible flag of the Golden Horde (Note: Only attested to in two sources, the Catalan Atlas a Spanish map produced in 1375. and Angelino Dulcert's 1339 map.)	A white flag with a red Tamga symbol.
	1271–1368	Possible flag of the Yuan dynasty (Note: Only attested to in one source, the Catalan Atlas a Spanish map produced in 1375.)	A white flag with three red crescent moons.
	1256–1335	Possible flag of the Ilkhanate	A yellow background with a red square.
	1226–1347	Possible flag of the Chagatai Khanate	A white background with a yellow square.
	1271–1635	Battle flag of the Yuan dynasty and Northern Yuan	
	1271–1635	Battle flag of the Yuan dynasty and Northern Yuan	
	1271–1635	Battle flag of the Yuan dynasty Northern Yuan	
	1862–1889	Flag used in Mongolia under Qing rule	Adopted in 1862 primarily for naval and diplomatic use, the flag featured a bright yellow triangular field with an Azure Dragon chasing a red pearl.
	1889–1911	Flag used in Mongolia under Qing rule	An Azure Dragon chasing a red flaming pearl on a plain yellow field. Yellow represented the ruling Manchu imperial family, while the dragon symbolized supreme imperial power.
	1911–1919; 1921–1924	Flag of the Bogd Khanate of Mongolia	A yellow oblong rectangle with religious prayer text and a Soyombo, the letters "E" and "Bam", and lotus flower in the middle, with red silk tails containing the letters "Ohm", "Aa", and "Hum".
	1919–1921	Flag during the Occupation of Mongolia	Five-colored flag of the Republic of China, used during Beiyang government's occupation of Outer Mongolia.
	1921–1924 (erroneous)	Alleged flag of the Revolutionary Provisional Government of Mongolia	A red field with the golden sun and crescent moon elements of the Soyombo symbol on the canton.
	1924–1940	Flag of the Mongolian People's Republic	A red field with a golden Soyombo symbol in the center and three tails on the fly. The flag's exact shape and design was not completely standardised and only defined as "the flag is red with the state emblem at the center."
	1924–1940	Flag of the Mongolian People's Republic	A red field with a golden soyombo symbol in the center.
	None; 1924–1930 (erroneous)	Flag of the Mongolian People's Republic	The 1924 variant flag of the Mongolian People's Republic was adopted on November 26, 1924, following the proclamation of the republic and the adoption of its first constitution. The flag was characterized by a red field featuring a blue Soyombo emblem, often with three triangular tails on the fly end, representing a transition from the previous regime to a socialist state.
	1930–1940	Flag of the Mongolian People's Republic	
	1940–1945	Flag of the Mongolian People's Republic	A red field with the country's emblem in the center.
	1945–1992	Flag of the Mongolian People's Republic	A vertical triband of red, blue, and red, with a Soyombo symbol topped with a five-pointed star centered on the red band at the hoist.
	1992–2011	National flag of Mongolia	A vertical triband of red, blue, and red, with a Soyombo symbol centered on the red band at the hoist.

== See also ==
- Flag of Mongolia
- Emblem of Mongolia
