= Menksoft Mongolian IME =

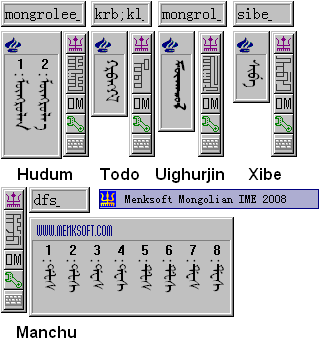
Menksoft Mongolian IME 2008

Menksoft Mongolian IME is an input method editor (or IME) made by Menksoft for typing Mongolian writing systems such as:

- Mongolian script
  - Uyghur style Mongolian script (Proto-Mongolian script, Mongolian written in the Old Uyghur alphabet by Tatar-Tonga)
  - Clear script
  - Manchu script
  - Xibe script
- 'Phags-pa script
- Soyombo script
- Galik script

== Function ==
The Menksoft IMEs make use of Private Use Areas of Unicode (PUA, U+E234–U+E71D) and the Chinese GB 18030 code that form the Menksoft Mongolian code (Chinese: 蒙科立蒙古文编码).

With the influence of Chinese input methods' built-in whole-sentence input pattern the focus of Menksoft Mongolian IME is not placed on a Mongolian keyboard layout but on phoneme pattern input methods, as they are more commonly used for Chinese-language text.

== Use ==
Unicode was late to provide adequate support for Mongolian script; the first and (as of 2009) only functional implementation was shipped with Windows Vista. This resulted in the popularity of Menksoft IMEs in Inner Mongolia, where local-government websites use them besides Unicode.

== Interface ==
=== English ===
There is an English interface for Menksoft Mongolian IME; however, Menksoft did not build an English installation program. Therefore, Westerners must use the Chinese installation programs (including mojibake), setting the language to the English interface through the language bar after installation.

== See also ==
- Boljoo IME
- Menksoft Mongolian IMEs
- Menksoft IMEs
