= Mongolian tögrög =

Currency of Mongolia

Монгол төгрөг (Mongolian); ᠮᠣᠩᠭᠣᠯ ᠲᠥᠭᠦᠷᠢᠭ (Mongolian)
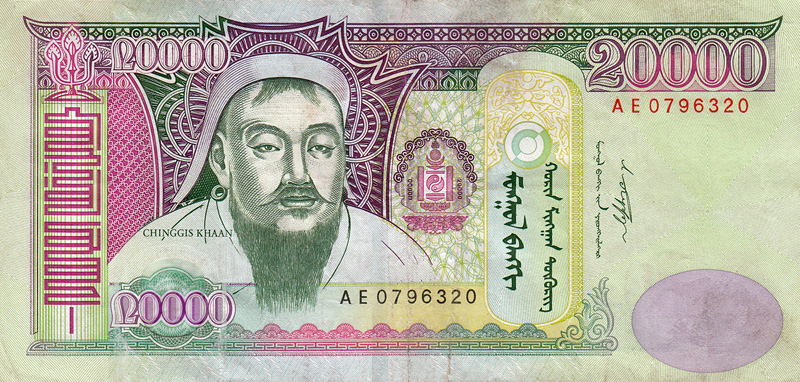
- 20,000 tögrög banknote

ISO 4217
- Code: MNT (numeric: 496)
- Subunit: 0.01

Units of account
- Plural: The language(s) of this currency do(es) not have a morphological plural distinction.
- Symbol: ₮
- Subunit
- 1/100: möngö (мөнгө/ᠮᠥᠩᠭᠦ)

Denominations
- Banknotes
- Freq. used: ₮10, ₮20, ₮50, ₮100, ₮500, ₮1,000, ₮5,000, ₮10,000, ₮20,000
- Rarely used: ₮0.10, ₮0.20, ₮0.50, ₮1, ₮5, ₮100,000
- Coins: ₮20, ₮50, ₮100, ₮200, ₮500

Demographics
- Date of introduction: 1925
- Replaced: Yuan, Mongolian dollar
- User(s): Mongolian People's Republic; Mongolia

Issuance
- Central bank: Bank of Mongolia
- Website: www.mongolbank.mn

Valuation
- Inflation: 7.0%
- Source: October 2024

The tögrög (Mongolian: ᠲᠥᠭᠦᠷᠢᠭ төгрөг [ˈtʰɵɣ.rɵk]; sign: ₮; code: MNT), also spelt tugrug or tugrik, is the official currency of Mongolia.

It was historically subdivided into 100 möngö (ᠮᠥᠩᠭᠦ мөнгө [mɵŋk]). Currently, the lowest denomination in regular use is the 10-tögrög note, and the highest is the 20,000-tögrög note. In Unicode, the currency sign is U+20AE ₮ TUGRIK SIGN.

== Etymology ==
The word tögrög refers to 'circle' or 'circular object' (i.e., a coin). Today, it is rarely used outside of referring to the currency, with the exception of the phrase tögrög sar (төгрөг сар), meaning 'full moon'.

== History ==
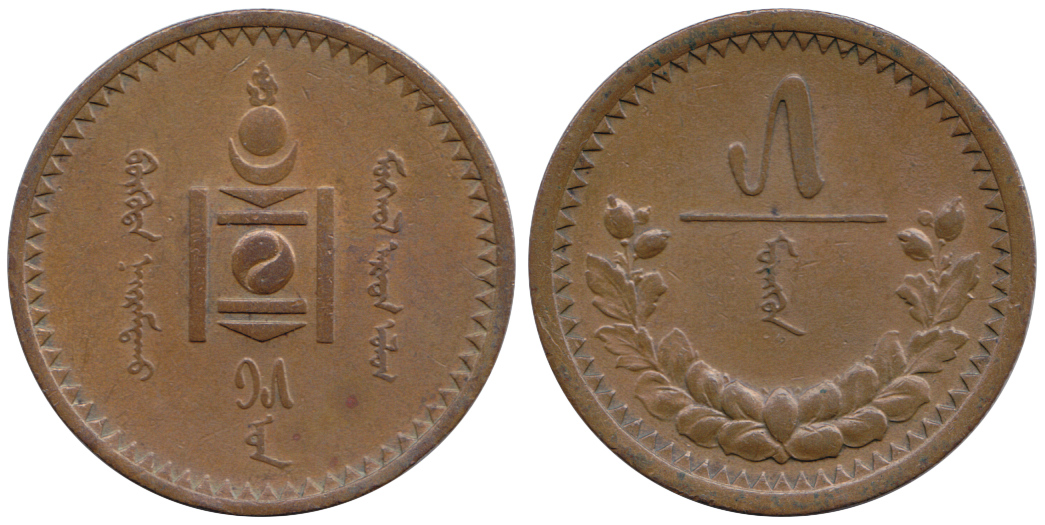
5 möngö 1925, copper.

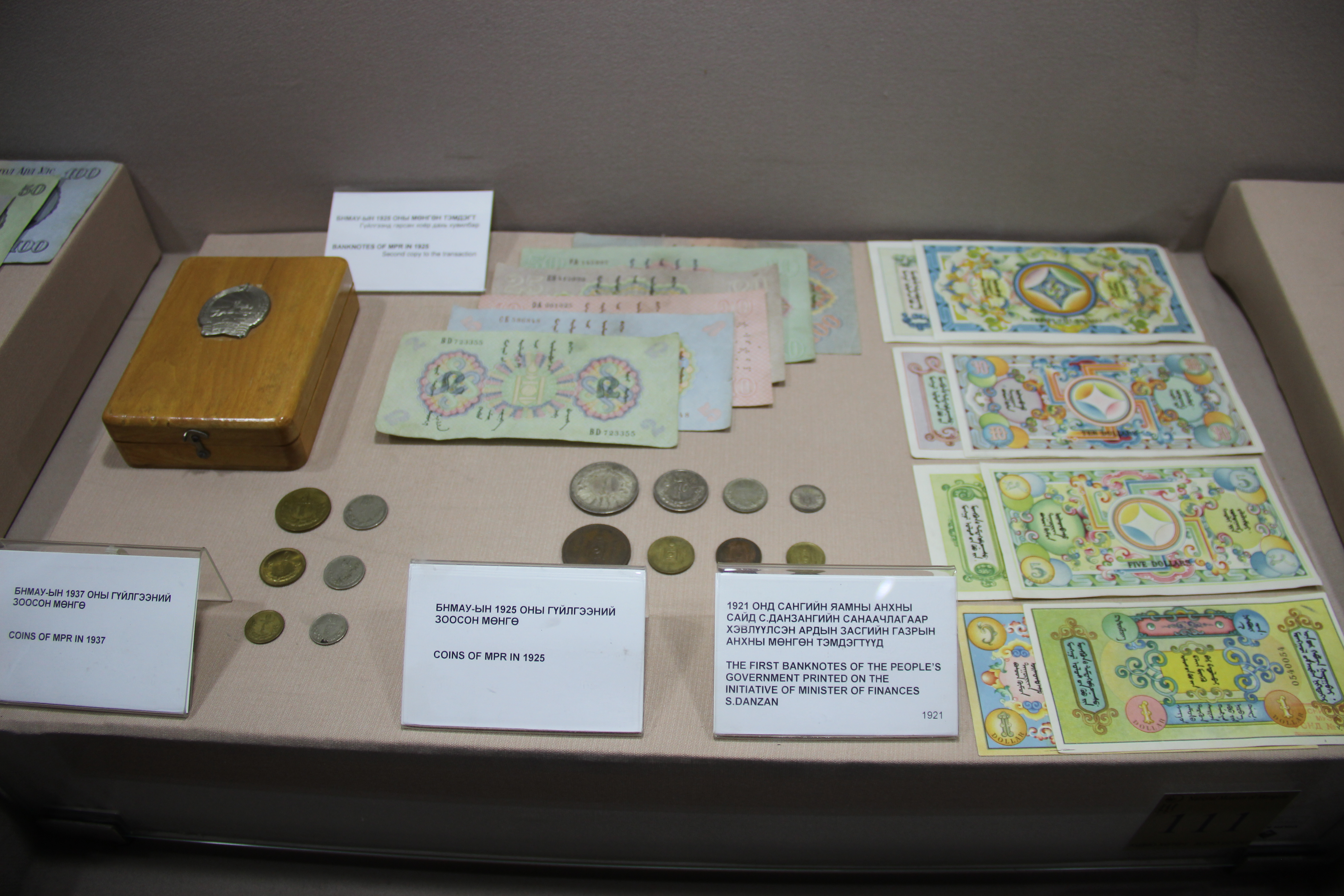
Socialist era tögrög in the National Museum of Mongolia

The tögrög was introduced on December 9, 1925, at a value equal to one Soviet ruble, where one ruble or tögrög was equal to 18 grams (0.58 ozt) of silver. It replaced the Mongolian dollar and other currencies and became the sole legal currency on April 1, 1928.

Möngö coins are no longer in circulation as currency, owing to their negligible value. Today, they are sold online and to tourists as collectibles.

In 2010, the tögrög rose 15% against the US dollar, due to the growth of the mining industry in Mongolia. However, its exchange rate eroded by 24% from early 2013 to June 2014 due to falling foreign investment and mining revenue.

== Coins ==
During socialism, the tögrög coin denominations were 1, 2, 5, 10, 15, 20, 50 möngö, and 1 tögrög. After the Mongolian People's Republic came to an end in 1992 and inflation surged, möngö coins were abandoned and larger tögrög values introduced.

Coin Series during the People's Republic of Mongolia era
Images	Series	Composition	Obverse	Reverse	Date recalled	Valueless since	Script	Minted in	Calendar used
	1925	1-5 möngö: copper 10-20 möngö: 0.5 silver 50 möngö, 1 tögrög: 90% silver	Soyombo	Value	1950	1970	Mongolian	Soviet Union	Mongolian Year 15
	1937	1-5 möngö: aluminium bronze 10-20 möngö: cupronickel	Soyombo	Value	1960	1970	Mongolian	Soviet Union	Mongolian Year 27
	1945	1-5 möngö: aluminium bronze 10-20 möngö: cupronickel	coat of arms, "Бүгд Найрамдах Монгол Ард Улс" (People's Republic of Mongolia)	Value	1970	1970	Cyrillic	Soviet Union	Mongolian Year 35
	1959	Aluminium	coat of arms, "Бүгд Найрамдах Монгол Ард Улс" (People's Republic of Mongolia)	Value	1990		Cyrillic	P.R. China	Common Era
,	1970, 77, 80, 81	1-5 möngö: aluminium 10-50 möngö: cupronickel	coat of arms, state title in short (БНМАУ) for 1-5 möngö, in full for 10-50 möngö	Value	—	—	Cyrillic	1970, 77: East Germany; 1980, 81: Mongolia	Common Era
	Circulating & commemorative 1 tögrög	1971: aluminium bronze, cupronickel, silver, or gold 1981: aluminium bronze	coat of arms, full state title, value	"БНМАУ", Damdin Sükhbaatar on a horse, "50 ЖИЛ" or "60 ЖИЛ" depending on the year	?	?	Cyrillic	1971: East Germany; 1981: Mongolia	—
	1981–88: 1 tögrög with various commemorative subjects	Aluminium bronze	coat of arms, full state title, value	6 designs, such as Karl Marx, Soviet-Mongolian space flight, etc.	?	?	Cyrillic	Mongolia	Common Era

Current Coins
Image		Value	Technical parameters				Description			Date of first minting
Obverse	Reverse	Value	Diameter	Thickness	Mass	Composition	Edge	Obverse	Reverse	Date of first minting
		20 tögrög	17.5 mm	1.5 mm	0.78 g	Aluminium	Plain	Value	Soyombo	1994
		50 tögrög	23 mm	1.8 mm	1.68 g	Aluminium	Plain	Value	Soyombo	1994
		100 tögrög	22 mm	1.5 mm	3.84 g	Cupronickel	Plain	Value, Janraisig Temple	Soyombo	1994
		200 tögrög	25 mm	1.7 mm	6.2 g	Cupronickel	Plain	Value, the Government House	Soyombo	1994
		500 tögrög	22 mm	1.7 mm	4.1 g	Cupronickel	Smooth	Value, Soyombo	Damdin Sükhbaatar	2001
For table standards, see the coin specification table.

== Banknotes ==
Like coins, the tögrög banknotes were very similar to the Soviet ruble during the Mongolian People's Republic era. The similarities included color theme, overall design, and the lineup of the denominations, which were 1, 3, 5, 10, 25, 50, 100 tögrög unless stated otherwise. The color for each value is

- 1 tögrög: brown
- 3 tögrög: green
- 5 tögrög: blue
- 10 tögrög: red
- 20 tögrög: green
- 25 tögrög: lilac
- 50 tögrög: green
- 100 tögrög: brown

Formerly, all banknotes were printed in the Soviet Union. Modern tögrög banknotes are generally printed in the United Kingdom.

Banknote Series during the People's Republic of Mongolia era
Image	Series	Obverse	Reverse	Date recalled	Valueless since	Script	Calendar used	Remark
	1925	Soyombo, value	Value	1940	1966	Mongolian	Common Era	2 tögrög in green instead of 3 tögrög
	1939	Soyombo, Sükhbaatar	Value	1955	1966	Mongolian	Common Era and Mongolian Year 29	25 tögrög in brown
	1941	Coat of arms, Sükhbaatar	Value	?		Both	Common Era and Mongolian Year 31	25 tögrög in brown
	1955	Coat of arms, Sükhbaatar	Value	1966		Cyrillic	Common Era	25 tögrög in blue on obverse, brown on reverse
	1966	Coat of arms, Sükhbaatar except 1 tögrög	Value for 1-25 tögrög, the Government House for 50 and 100 tögrög	—		Both	Common Era	
	1981, 1983	Coat of arms, Sükhbaatar except 1 tögrög	As above, except industrial theme for 20 tögrög	—		Both	Common Era	20 tögrög in green instead of 25 tögrög

1993 Series
Image		Value	Dimensions	Main Color	Description			Date of printing	Usage
Obverse	Reverse	Value	Dimensions	Main Color	Obverse	Reverse	Watermark	Date of printing	Usage
		10 möngö	45 × 90 mm	Pink	Soyombo, Archery	Archery	—	1993	Very rare in circulation. Abundant among collectors.
		20 möngö	45 × 90 mm	Yellow-brown	Soyombo, Wrestling	Wrestling	—	1993	Very rare in circulation. Abundant among collectors.
		50 möngö	45 × 90 mm	Green-cyan	Soyombo, Horse riding	Horse riding	—	1993	Very rare in circulation. Abundant among collectors.
		1 tögrög (neg)	115 × 57 mm	Yellow-brown	Lion	Soyombo, Paiza	Genghis Khan	1993, 2008, 2014	Rarely used anywhere but in banks
		5 tögrög (tavan)	120 × 60 mm	Orange	Sükhbaatar, Soyombo, Paiza	Mountainous landscape and horses eating grass	Genghis Khan	1993, 2008, 2014	Rarely used anywhere but in banks
		10 tögrög (arvan)	125 × 61 mm	Green	Sükhbaatar, Soyombo, Paiza	Mountainous landscape and horses eating grass	Genghis Khan	1993, 2002, 2005, 2007, 2009, 2011, 2013, 2014, 2017^{3}, 2018, 2020	The smallest commonly used note
		20 tögrög (horin)	130 × 64 mm	Reddish purple	Sükhbaatar, Soyombo, Paiza	Mountainous landscape and horses eating grass	Genghis Khan	1993, 2002, 2005, 2007, 2009, 2011, 2013, 2014, 2017^{3}, 2018, 2020	
		50 tögrög (tavin)	135 × 66 mm	Brown	Sükhbaatar, Soyombo, Paiza	Mountainous landscape and horses eating grass	Genghis Khan	1993, 2000, 2008, 2013, 2014, 2016,^{3} 2019, 2020	
		100 tögrög (zuun)	140 × 68 mm	Violet	Sükhbaatar, Soyombo, Paiza	Mountainous landscape and horses eating grass	Genghis Khan	1993, 2000, 2008, 2013, 2014, 2016,^{3} 2019, 2020	
		500 tögrög (tavan zuun)	145 × 70 mm	Green	Genghis Khan, Soyombo, Paiza	Mongolian yurts in motion	Genghis Khan	1993, 1997, 2003, 2007, 2011, 2013; 2000, 2003, 2013, 2016, 2020	
		1000 tögrög (myangan)	150 × 72 mm	Blue	Genghis Khan, Soyombo, Paiza	Mongolian yurts in motion	Genghis Khan	1993, 1997, 2003, 2007, 2011, 2013, 2017, 2020	
		5000 tögrög (tavan myangan)	150 × 72 mm	Pink-purple	Genghis Khan, Soyombo, Paiza	"Drinking Fountain" at Genghis Khan's court	Genghis Khan	1994, 2003, 2013, 2018	
		10,000 tögrög (arvan myangan)	150 × 72 mm	goldish yellow	Genghis Khan, Soyombo, Paiza	"Drinking Fountain" at Genghis Khan's court	Genghis Khan	1995, 2002, 2009, 2014, 2021	
		20,000 tögrög (horin myangan)	150 × 72 mm	Lime and purple	Genghis Khan, Soyombo, Paiza	Nine White Banner	Genghis Khan	2006, 2009, 2013, 2019	
For table standards, see the banknote specification table.

=== Remarks ===
1. Images shown are the earliest variations of each value
2. Issued dates are listed for up to 2003. It is known that there is a 2005 edition of 10 tögrög, but it is yet unclear whether or not it was the only value for the 2005 edition.
3. Lower value notes (10 ~ 500 tögrög) issued in 2000 and after have line-patterned color underprint on the entire note, where the previous edition had near-white solid color. But one exception to the rule is the 2000 edition of 500 tögrög.
4. High value notes (500 ~ 10,000 tögrög) issued in 2002 and after have a patch on the lower right hand side of obverse as an improved anti-counterfeit device, which used to be printed only on the two highest values. The new patch is also more sophisticated than the ones in the 1990s. The Soyombo symbol was upgraded to a hologram on the two highest values. On series 2018 5000 tögrög, the hologram was changed to an OVMI ink.

Current MNT exchange rates
From Google Finance:	AUD CAD CHF CNY EUR GBP HKD JPY USD KRW JPY USD
From Yahoo! Finance:	AUD CAD CHF CNY EUR GBP HKD JPY USD KRW JPY USD
From XE.com:	AUD CAD CHF CNY EUR GBP HKD JPY USD KRW JPY USD
From OANDA:	AUD CAD CHF CNY EUR GBP HKD JPY USD KRW JPY USD

== See also ==
- Economy of Mongolia

Preceded by: Mongolian dollar Ratio: 1 tögrög = 1 Soviet ruble. 2432 tögrög = 1 United States dollar	Currency of Mongolia; 1925 –	Succeeded by: Current
