= Mongolian dollar =

Former currency of Mongolia (1921–25)

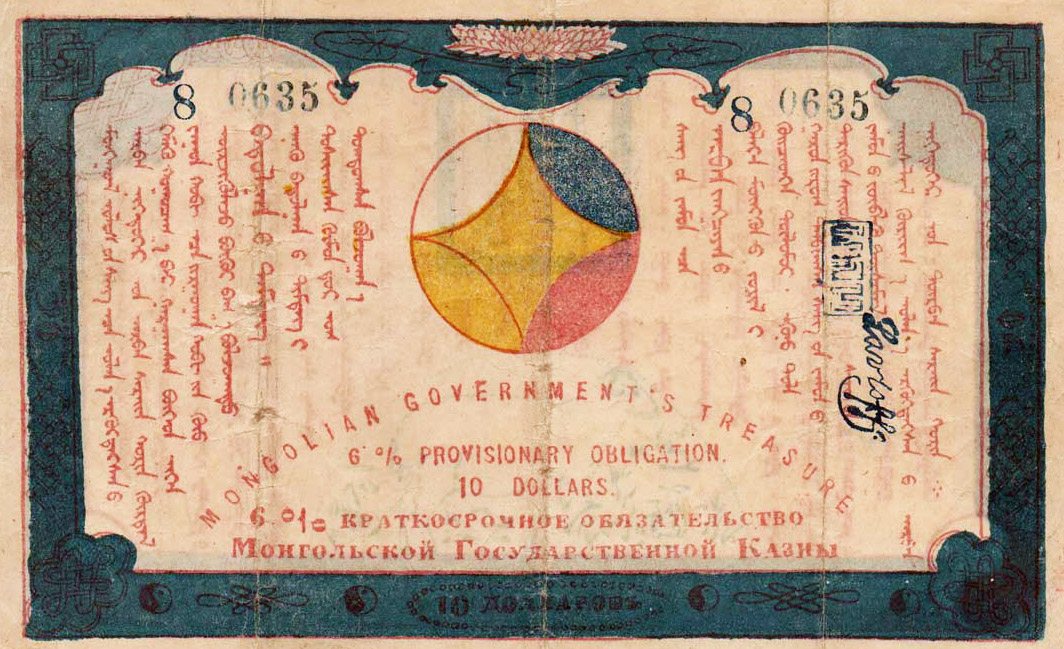
Mongolian Government's Treasure. 6% provisionary obligation. 10 dollars

The dollar (Mongolian: доллар) was the currency of Mongolia between 1921 and 1925 during the transition from the rule of the Bogd Khan government to the People's Government. The treasury notes were issued under Baron Ungern in 1921. The denominations were 10, 20, 50, and 100 dollars. The dollar, together with other circulating currencies, was replaced by the togrog in 1925.

== History ==
In April 1921, the government of the Bogd Khanate authorized the issue of six-month treasury notes bearing 6% interest. The notes, known as "baga bolzoot" (Mongolian: бага болзоот), were intended to provide a national currency and were guaranteed by livestock assets. Denominations of 10, 25, 50 and 100 dollars were issued. A total of 250,000 dollars was printed. The notes were produced using carved wooden printing blocks.

The engraving work was carried out by craftsman Luvsangombo, known by the nickname "Black Hand", who had previously carved the state seal of Mongolia. The design incorporated traditional Mongolian artistic motifs together with official state symbols. The banknotes were trilingual, containing inscriptions in Mongolian (in Mongolian script), Russian and English. On the obverse, the text stated that the notes had been issued by the Treasury of Mongolia and would bear interest until 20 October 1921. They also carried the signatures of officials of the Ministry of Finance and the ministry's official seal.

Each denomination featured a different livestock illustration on its reverse side. A sheep on the 10 dollar banknote, a cattle on the 25 dollar banknote, a horse on the 50 dollar banknote and a camel on the 100 dollar banknote.

Above the animal illustration appeared the Soyombo symbol together with the seal of the Ministry of Finance. The use of livestock imagery reflected the importance of pastoralism in the Mongolian economy and emphasized the government's claim that the notes were supported by national wealth.

The notes were printed in several colors. The 10-dollar note combined blue, brown, white, yellow and pink shades; the 25-dollar note was primarily red and pink; the 50-dollar note used yellow, white and pink tones; and the 100-dollar note was printed mainly in yellow and red.

Because the notes were issued during the period when the forces of Baron Roman von Ungern-Sternberg exercised political and military influence in Mongolia, the currency became popularly known as "Baron's money".

== Use under the People's Government ==
Following the victory of the Mongolian Revolution in 1921 and the establishment of the People's Government, Mongolia faced serious monetary difficulties. The country had no central bank and no unified national currency system. Government officials regarded the continued circulation of foreign currencies as an obstacle to economic development and financial independence.

To address this problem, the Ministry of Finance ordered a new series of banknotes from the Soviet Union. Soviet authorities accepted the order and printed approximately 3.5 million dollars in banknotes.

The new series was produced in denominations of 50 cents, 1 dollar, 3 dollars, 5 dollars, 10 dollars and 25 dollars. The designs differed significantly from the 1921 issued banknotes. They featured elaborate national ornamentation and more sophisticated printing techniques. The observe included inscriptions identifying the notes as the banknotes of Mongolia and stating that they were guaranteed cash reserves. The signatures of the Minister of Finance Soliin Danzan and cashier Davaa appeared on the notes, together with serial numbers and decorative framing.

The reverse side displayed traditional ornamental designs centered around a ''khas'' symbol. It also contained anti-counterfeiting warnings stating that persons producing false banknotes would be punished according to law. The denomination appeared in Mongolian (in Mongolian script), English and Arabic numerals.

By the second half of 1922, the practical role of the dollar had diminished significantly. Contemporary sources indicate that the notes were used primarily for the payment of land rents and certain government obligations. Many of the notes eventually returned to the treasury of the Ministry of Finance rather than remaining in active circulation.

It was intended to replace the Chinese yuan at par but, European travelers and observers of the period reported that the currency had little practical value in everyday commerce, and foreign currencies continued to play an important role in the Mongolian economy.

The establishment of the Mongolian–Russian Trade and Development Bank marked an important step toward the creation of a modern monetary system. In 1925 the government introduced the tögrög as Mongolia's official currency.

The new currency replaced the dollar and other circulating monetary instruments, creating a unified national currency system. The reform laid the foundations for Mongolia's modern banking sector and reduced dependence on foreign currencies in domestic transactions.

Preceded by: Silver Dragon; Note: Use Qing dynasty coinage during this period.	Currency of Mongolia; 1921 – 1925	Succeeded by: Tögrög
