= Flag of Agin-Buryat Okrug =

Agin-Buryat Okrug
- Proportion: 2:3
- Adopted: 6 July 2001
- Design: Vertical tricolour of blue, yellow, and white with a yellow Soyombo symbol at top left
- Designed by: Bato Dampilon

The state flag of Agin-Buryat Okrug in eastern Russia is a vertical tricolour of blue, yellow and white. The flag is charged with a yellow partial Soyombo symbol at the upper end of the blue band. The Soyombo is a cultural symbol of the Mongols, and is also present on the flags of Mongolia and Buryatia.

The flag was designed by the Buryat artist Bato Dampilon. It was adopted on 6 July 2001. Its proportions are 2:3.
