= Boljoo =

Instant messaging software

Screenshot of Boljoo Chat

Boljoo, or Boljoo Chat, is a popular freeware Mongolian script instant messaging computer program. It is based on a simple Mongolian input-method.

== Boljoo IME ==
There is also a standalone Mongolian input method made by Boljoo, called Boljoo IME. Boljoo IME supports Menksoft and Saiyin codes.

Unlike Menksoft Mongolian IME, Boljoo IME has an English installation interface and is installed as English by default. However, it's a standalone program in the system tray, so you can not find it in ctfmon. And the IME must be enabled before use.

Designed for the Inner Mongolian who cannot speak Chinese, Boljoo IME has a pure Mongolian script installation and using guide.

== See also ==
- Comparison of cross-platform instant messaging clients
- Comparison of instant messaging protocols
- Comparison of Internet Relay Chat clients
- Comparison of LAN messengers
- Comparison of VoIP software
- List of SIP software
- List of video telecommunication services and product brands
- Mongolian script
