= Soyombo script =

Abugida-type writing system

Soyombo script 𑪁𑩖𑩻𑩖𑪌𑩰𑩖 𑩰𑩑𑩢𑩑𑪊
- Script type: Abugida
- Creator: Zanabazar, 1686
- Period: 1686–18th century
- Direction: Left-to-right
- Languages: Mongolian, Tibetan, Sanskrit

Related scripts
- Parent systems: Egyptian hieroglyphs: Proto-Sinaitic script; Phoenician alphabet; Aramaic alphabet; Brāhmī; North Brāhmī; Gupta; Siddhaṃ; Gaudi; Nepalese; Ranjana; Soyombo script

ISO 15924
- ISO 15924: Soyo (329), Soyombo

Unicode
- Unicode alias: Soyombo
- Unicode range: U+11A50–U+11AAF Soyombo

The Soyombo script (Mongolian: Соёмбо бичиг, ᠰᠣᠶᠤᠩᠪᠤ ᠪᠢᠴᠢᠭ 𑪁𑩖𑩻𑩖𑪌𑩰𑩖 𑩰𑩑𑩢𑩑𑪊, romanized: Soyombo bichig, lit. 'self-created holy letters') is an abugida invented by the Mongolian Buddhist monk Zanabazar in 1686 to write Mongolian. It can also be used to write Tibetan and Sanskrit.

A special character of the script, the Soyombo symbol, became a national symbol of Mongolia and has appeared on the national flag and emblem of Mongolia since 1911, as well as in money and postage stamps.

== Creation ==
The script was designed in 1686 by Zanabazar, the first spiritual leader of Tibetan Buddhism in Mongolia, who also designed the Zanabazar square script. The Soyombo script was created as the fourth Mongolian script, only 38 years after the invention of the Clear Script. The name of the script alludes to this story. It is derived from the Sanskrit word svayambhu 'self-created'.

The syllabic system appears to be based on Devanagari, while the base shape of the letters is derived from the Ranjana script. Details of individual characters resemble traditional Mongolian writing systems and the Old Turkic script.

== Use ==
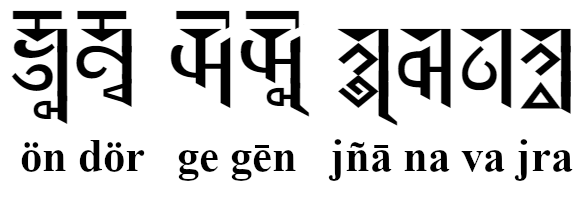
"Öndör Gegeen Zanabazar" properly rendered in Soyombo Script

The eastern Mongols used the script primarily as a ceremonial and decorative script. Zanabazar had created it for the translation of Buddhist texts from Sanskrit or Tibetan, and both he and his students used it extensively for that purpose.

As it was much too complicated to be adopted as an everyday script, its use is practically nonexistent today. Aside from historical texts, it can usually be found in temple inscriptions. It also has some relevance to linguistic research, because it reflects certain developments in the Mongolian language, such as that of long vowels.

== Form ==
Syllable structure for Mongolian. Consonant or vowel carrier (C_{b}), vowel (V), length marker (L), diphthong marker (V_{d}) and a final consonant C_{f})

Syllable structure for Sanskrit. Consonant in prefix form (C_{p}), consonant or vowel carrier (C_{b}), stack of medial consonants (C_{2}...C_{n}), vowel (V), length marker (L), anusvara (S_{a}) and visarga (S_{v}).

Syllable structure for Tibetan. Consonant in prefix form (C_{p}), consonant or vowel carrier (C_{b}), stack of medial consonants (C_{2}...C_{n}), vowel (V), length marker (L), tsheg (T).

The Soyombo script was the first Mongolian script to be written horizontally from left to right, in contrast to earlier scripts that had been written vertically. As in the Tibetan and Devanagari scripts, the signs are suspended below a horizontal line, giving each line of text a visible "backbone".

The Soyombo symbol (in its various variations) is used as special characters to mark the start of a text. Two of its elements (the upper triangle and the right vertical bar) form the angular base frame for the other characters. Another type of symbol, an end marker, marks the end of text, and has a similar frame.

Within this frame, the syllables are composed of one to three elements. The first consonant is placed high within the angle. The vowel is given by a mark above the frame, except for u and ü which are marked in the low center. A second consonant is specified by a small mark, appended to the inside of the vertical bar, pushing any u or ü mark to the left side. A short oblique hook at the bottom of the vertical bar marks a long vowel. There is also a curved or jagged mark to the right of the vertical bar for the two diphthongs.

=== Syllable structure ===
==== Mongolian ====
A syllable in Mongolian must contain a consonant or the null-consonant ⟨𑩐⟩, and may contain any of a vowel marker, a vowel length marker, a diphthong marker, and a final consonant.

==== Tibetan ====
A syllable in Tibetan must contain a consonant or the null-consonant ⟨𑩐⟩, and may contain any of a prefixed consonant, medial consonants, a vowel marker, a vowel length marker, and a syllable-ending tsheg.

==== Sanskrit ====
A syllable in Sanskrit must contain a consonant or the null-consonant ⟨𑩐⟩, and may contain any of prefixed consonant, medial consonants, a vowel marker, a vowel length marker, a diphthong marker, and one of the diacritics, anusvara or visarga.

Example Sanskrit syllables
𑪀𑪖 saṃ	𑩝𑪙𑩻𑩛 khyā	𑩪𑩑𑩛𑪗 ṇīḥ	𑪀𑪙𑩦𑩓𑩛𑪏 ṣṭūp	𑩞𑩘𑪑 gaur	𑪀𑪙𑩴𑩙 smṛ

== Alphabet ==
=== Consonants ===
Soyombo contains the full set of letters to reproduce Mongolian as well as additional letters (Mongolian: гали, romanized: gali) used in transcribing Sanskrit and Tibetan. Some letters represent different sounds in Mongolian, Sanskrit, and Tibetan. The primary difference between the three occurs in Mongolian, where letters for Sanskrit voiceless sounds are used for voiced stops, while the letters for voiceless aspirated sounds are used for voiceless stops.

𑩜 ka	𑩝 kha	𑩞 ga	𑩟 gha (Note: Letters used for Sanskrit transcription.)	𑩠 ṅa	𑩡 ca	𑩢 cha	𑩣 ja	𑩤 jha	𑩥 ña
𑩦 ṭa	𑩧 ṭha	𑩨 ḍa	𑩩 ḍha	𑩪 ṇa	𑩫 ta	𑩬 tha	𑩭 da	𑩮 dha	𑩯 na
𑩰 pa	𑩱 pha	𑩲 ba	𑩳 bha	𑩴 ma	𑩵 tsa (Note: Letters used for Tibetan transcription.)	𑩶 tsha	𑩷 dza	𑩸 źa	𑩹 za
𑩺 'a	𑩻 ya	𑩾 va	𑩼 ra	𑩽 la	𑩿 śa	𑪀 ṣa	𑪁 sa	𑪂 ha	𑪃 kṣa

==== Mongolian ====
Mongolian employs a subset of Soyombo consonants, with Mongolian-specific pronunciations.

Mongolian Soyombo consonants
𑩜 ɡa/ɢa	𑩝 ka/qa	𑩠 ŋa	𑩣 ja	𑩢 ca	𑩥 ña	𑩫 da	𑩬 ta	𑩯 na	𑩰 ba
𑩱 pa	𑩴 ma	𑩻 ya	𑩼 ra	𑩾 va	𑩽 la	𑩿 sha	𑪁 sa	𑪂 ha	𑪃 ksa

In Mongolian, a final consonant is written with a simplified variant of the basic letter in the bottom of the frame. In cases where it would conflict with the vowels u or ü the vowel is written to the left.

𑩐𑪊 aɡ	𑩐𑪋 ak	𑩐𑪌 aŋ	𑩐𑪍 ad/at	𑩐𑪎 an	𑩐𑪏 ab/ap
𑩐𑪐 am	𑩐𑪑 ar	𑩐𑪒 al	𑩐𑪓 aš	𑩐𑪔 as	𑩐𑪕 ah

==== Sanskrit and Tibetan ====
In Sanskrit and Tibetan, consonant clusters are usually written by stacking up to three consonants vertically within the same frame.

Example consonant clusters
𑩣 + 𑩪 𑩣𑪙𑩠 jṅa	𑩜 + 𑩿 𑩜𑪙𑩿 kśa	𑩭 + 𑩾 𑩭𑪙𑩾 dva	𑩯 + 𑩭 𑩯𑪙𑩭 nda	𑩲 + 𑪁 + 𑩜 𑩲𑪙𑪁𑪙𑩜 bska	𑩜 + 𑪀 + 𑩴 𑩜𑪙𑪀𑪙𑩴 kṣma	𑩭 + 𑩭 𑩭𑪘 dda	𑩴 + 𑩴 𑩴𑪘 mma

In consonant clusters beginning with ⟨𑩼⟩ ra, ⟨𑩽⟩ la, ⟨𑩿⟩ śa or ⟨𑪁⟩ sa, the first consonant can be reduced to a small prefix written to the left of the next letter's main triangle. For example, the syllable ⟨𑩼𑪙𑩜⟩ rka can also be written ⟨𑪆𑩜⟩.

Example prefixed consonants
𑪆 r-	𑪇 l-	𑪈 ś-	𑪉 s-
𑪆𑩜 rka	𑪇𑩜 lka	𑪈𑩜 śka	𑪉𑩜 ska

=== Vowels ===
As in other Brahmic scripts, a consonant in the Soyombo script carries an inherent vowel, a, so, for example, the letter ⟨𑩜⟩ is pronounced ka. Syllables with other vowel sounds are constructed by adding a vowel mark to the base character. So, for example, the syllable ⟨𑩜𑩑⟩ ki is formed by adding the diacritic ⟨𑩑⟩ to a ⟨𑩜⟩. The first character of the alphabet ⟨𑩐⟩ acts as a null consonant or vowel carrier, allowing formation of syllables beginning with a vowel sound. On its own, it represents a short a. Syllables starting with other vowels are constructed by adding a vowel mark to ⟨𑩐⟩.

Mongolian uses seven vowels, all of which have a short and a long form. The long form is indicated with the length mark. Diphthongs are represented by adding one of the diphthong markers to a syllable.

Vowels combined with ⟨𑩐⟩: 𑩐 a / 𑩐𑩑 i / 𑩐𑩔 e / 𑩐𑩒 ü / 𑩐𑩓 u / 𑩐𑩕 o / 𑩐𑩖 ö; 𑩐𑩛 ā / 𑩐𑩑𑩛 ī / 𑩐𑩔𑩛 ē / 𑩐𑩛𑩒 ǖ / 𑩐𑩛𑩓 ū / 𑩐𑩕𑩛 ō / 𑩐𑩖𑩛 ȫ	Diphthongs: ◌𑩗 -i / ◌𑩘 -u; 𑩐𑩗 ai / 𑩐𑩘 au

Sanskrit also includes the syllabic consonants ṛ and ḷ, which are treated as vowels and may be short or long. Sanskrit transcription also requires two additional diacritics, the anusvara ⟨◌𑪖⟩, which indicates that a vowel is nasalised, and the visarga ⟨◌𑪗⟩, which indicates post-vocalic aspiration.

𑩐𑩙 ṛ	𑩐𑩙𑩛𑩙 ṝ	𑩐𑩚 ḷ	𑩐𑩚𑩛 ḹ	𑩐𑪖 aṃ	𑩐𑪗 aḥ

== Punctuation ==
Apart from the Soyombo symbol, the only punctuation mark is a full stop, represented by a vertical bar. In inscriptions, words are often separated by a dot at the height of the upper triangle (tsheg).

== Unicode ==
Soyombo script has been included in the Unicode Standard since the release of Unicode version 10.0 in June 2017. The Soyombo block currently comprises 83 characters. The proposal to encode Soyombo was submitted by Anshuman Pandey. The Unicode proposal was revised in December 2015.

The Unicode block for Soyombo is U+11A50–U+11AAF:

Soyombo^{[1]}^{[2]} Official Unicode Consortium code chart (PDF)
	0	1	2	3	4	5	6	7	8	9	A	B	C	D	E	F
U+11A5x	𑩐	𑩑	𑩒	𑩓	𑩔	𑩕	𑩖	𑩗	𑩘	𑩙	𑩚	𑩛	𑩜	𑩝	𑩞	𑩟
U+11A6x	𑩠	𑩡	𑩢	𑩣	𑩤	𑩥	𑩦	𑩧	𑩨	𑩩	𑩪	𑩫	𑩬	𑩭	𑩮	𑩯
U+11A7x	𑩰	𑩱	𑩲	𑩳	𑩴	𑩵	𑩶	𑩷	𑩸	𑩹	𑩺	𑩻	𑩼	𑩽	𑩾	𑩿
U+11A8x	𑪀	𑪁	𑪂	𑪃	𑪄	𑪅	𑪆	𑪇	𑪈	𑪉	𑪊	𑪋	𑪌	𑪍	𑪎	𑪏
U+11A9x	𑪐	𑪑	𑪒	𑪓	𑪔	𑪕	𑪖	𑪗	𑪘	𑪙	𑪚	𑪛	𑪜	𑪝	𑪞	𑪟
U+11AAx	𑪠	𑪡	𑪢													
Notes 1.As of Unicode version 18.0 2.Grey areas indicate non-assigned code points

The Menksoft IMEs provide alternative input methods.

== See also ==
- Mongolian writing systems
