= Menksoft =

Software company based in Inner Mongolia, China

Menksoft (Mongolian: ᠮᠦᠩᠬᠡ ᠭᠠᠯ ᠰᠣᠹᠲ 'inextinguishible flame'; Chinese: 蒙科立; pinyin: Měng Kē Lì) is an IT company in Inner Mongolia which developed Menksoft Mongolian IME—the most widely used Mongolian-language IME in Inner Mongolia.

== History ==
Menksoft was established in May 2002 by S. Soyolt (Chinese: 苏·苏雅拉图; Pinyin: Sū. Sūyǎlātú). In 2003, it was evaluated as a major software enterprise of Inner Mongolia and one of the 20 largest private enterprises in Hohhot. In 2004, it gained the Gold Prize of INT'L Soft China. It is supported by the Chinese government.

== Corporate leadership ==
Menksoft holds close ties with the Inner Mongolia University for Nationalities. The Mongolian website of Inner Mongolia University for Nationalities is tl.menksoft.com under the Menksoft webhost menksoft.com.

== Input method series and their code ==
The Mongolian code used in Menksoft Mongolian IMEs has become the de facto international code of Mongolian: the largest competitor of Menksoft in Mongolian script input domain — Saiyin — wrote a "howto" for users to use Saiyin code and Menksoft code in parallel, and says "What would you do if you've already installed and registered Saiyin IME, but you want to contribute for newspaper office? They do only accept Menksoft code. Saiyin has already settled this problem for you" on a page of its website called "How to use Saiyin IME with Menksoft in parallel."

Besides the integrated code converter in Menksoft Mongolian IME, there is a standalone version converter which can convert almost every Mongolian script code, except Unicode.

Input method series

The Menksoft IMEs are a collection of Input method editors (IMEs) for typing Mongolian-related scripts such as Mongolian script, Uyghurjin script, Manchu script, and Xibe script.

== Menksoft Mongolian Input method series ==
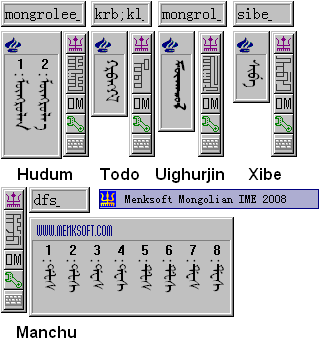

Menksoft Mongolian IME is the only free and widely used input method editor of Menksoft.

Supported scripts include Mongolian, Uyghurjin, Manchu, Xibe, etc.

The Menksoft IMEs make use of Private Use Areas (PUA) of Unicode and the Chinese GB 18030 code that form the so-called "Menksoft Mongolian code" (Chinese: 蒙科立蒙古文编码).

With the influence of Chinese input methods built-in whole sentence input pattern, the focus of Menksoft Mongolian IME is not placed on a Mongolian keyboard layout, but on phoneme pattern input methods, as they are more commonly used for Chinese language text.

- For the standard Unicode keyboard layout of Menksoft, see Menksoft Mongolian Phoneme Input Methods.
- For the word pattern IME of Menksoft, see Menk Mongolian Whole-Word Input method

Unicode was late to provide adequate support for the Mongolian script, where the first and as of 2009 only functional implementation is shipped with Windows Vista. This resulted in some popularity for the Menksoft IMEs in Inner Mongolia, where even the local government websites uses them.

There is an English interface of Menksoft Mongolian IME, but Menksoft did not build an English installation program. People using operating systems without Chinese language support must use the Chinese installation programs (maybe mojibake) and set the language settings to English interface through the language bar after installation. Menksoft is incompatible with Macintosh operating systems.

== Menk Mongolian Whole-Word Input method ==
Menk Mongolian Whole-Word Input method

Based on research, Menk Mongolian Whole-Word Input method (Chinese: 蒙科立蒙古文整词输入法 or 传统蒙古文整词智能化输入输出系统) is said to be the first word input pattern input method for 拼音文字 (a concept including alphabet (linguistic definition), abugida and semi-syllabary, excluding syllabary) in the world.

In this method, you can type fewer letters than Menksoft Mongolian IME. For example, "sainjiyaga" in Menksoft Mongolian IME becomes "saijyg"; "erdemtu" becomes "eedt"; the word "Mongol" can be input by typing "mc;gv".

Unlike Menksoft Mongolian IME, the whole-word input method is not freeware; it is a professional and educational edition.

Supported scripts are Mongolian, clear, Manchu, and Xibe.

== Menksoft Mongolian Phoneme Input Methods ==
Disc of Menksoft Slav Mongolian Input Method of Menksoft Mongolian Phoneme Input Methods

Menksoft Mongolian Phoneme Input Methods (蒙科立音码输入法系列) are keyboard layouts using ISO/IEC 10646-1:2000(E) standard Unicode (except for Uyghur style Mongolian script).

Supported scripts are Mongolian, Uyghur-style Mongolian (Proto-Mongolian, Mongolian written in Old Uyghur alphabet by Tatar-Tonga), Clear, Manchu, Xibe, and Mongolian Cyrillic Mongolian script.

== Menksoft Khitan small script application system ==
=== Menksoft Kazak IME ===
==== Menksoft International Phonetic Input method ====
A related keyboard.

== Network ==
=== Menksoft Content Management System ===
MenkCMS Mongolian CMS System Technique Study Menksoft Web Develop Department

== Fonts ==
Embedded fonts of Menksoft Mongolian IME

- Menksoft Garqag
- Menksoft Hara
- Menksoft Hawang
- Menksoft Qagan
- Menksoft Scnin
- Menksoft (Menksoft.tte) default EUDC font ("end-user-defined character"), the only font support not only Hudum Mongolian, but also Todo, Manchu, Sibe, Uyghurjin, Phags-pa, Soyombo, Horizontal Square, etc. Not selectable in font list.

Menksoft Qagan is the standard font and looks similar to Menksoft.tte and Mongolian Baiti. Qagan (a.k.a. Chagan) means white in Mongolian.

Standalone

- Menksoft Qimed
- Mengsoft Amglang

== Word processing ==
Mongolian WPS Office 2002

Cooperate with Kingsoft. Adopted by Inner Mongolia Academy of Social Science, but the interface is poor.

== Menksoft Ethnical RedFlag Linux ==
There is a Menksoft Ethnical RedFlag Linux. There is also an Office system work in Chinese Linux (not the former Linux).

== See also ==
- Boljoo
