= Soyombo Movie Theater =

Cinema in Ulaanbaatar, Mongolia

Coordinates: 47.9128°N 106.8446°E

The Soyombo movie theater or Soyombo cinema (Mongolian: Соёмбо кино театр) is a cinema located on the west side of Ulaanbaatar, Mongolia. It is one of the main movie theaters in the country.

A cinema in Mongolia

The movie theater was first founded in 1990 by Russian engineers of the Soviet Union. After privatization in 1991, it was owned by "Soyombo production and travel" Co, ltd. In 2007, renovation of the building and technology began under the investments of the owner company. In August 2008 the new Soyombo cinema opened and now shows U.S. and domestic films in three screens daily.
