= Soyombo (Unicode block) =

- Range: U+11A50..U+11AAF (96 code points)
- Plane: SMP
- Scripts: Soyombo
- Assigned: 83 code points
- Unused: 13 reserved code points

Unicode version history
- 10.0 (2017): 80 (+80)
- 11.0 (2018): 81 (+1)
- 12.0 (2019): 83 (+2)

Unicode documentation
- Code chart ∣ Web page

Soyombo is a Unicode block containing characters from the Soyombo alphabet, which is an abugida developed by the monk and scholar Zanabazar (1635–1723) in 1686 to write Mongolian. It can also be used to write Tibetan and Sanskrit. In addition, this block includes the Soyombo symbol on the flag of Mongolia.

== Block ==
The Soyombo block was added to Unicode in June 2017 with version 10.0:

Soyombo^{[1]}^{[2]} Official Unicode Consortium code chart (PDF)
	0	1	2	3	4	5	6	7	8	9	A	B	C	D	E	F
U+11A5x	𑩐	𑩑	𑩒	𑩓	𑩔	𑩕	𑩖	𑩗	𑩘	𑩙	𑩚	𑩛	𑩜	𑩝	𑩞	𑩟
U+11A6x	𑩠	𑩡	𑩢	𑩣	𑩤	𑩥	𑩦	𑩧	𑩨	𑩩	𑩪	𑩫	𑩬	𑩭	𑩮	𑩯
U+11A7x	𑩰	𑩱	𑩲	𑩳	𑩴	𑩵	𑩶	𑩷	𑩸	𑩹	𑩺	𑩻	𑩼	𑩽	𑩾	𑩿
U+11A8x	𑪀	𑪁	𑪂	𑪃	𑪄	𑪅	𑪆	𑪇	𑪈	𑪉	𑪊	𑪋	𑪌	𑪍	𑪎	𑪏
U+11A9x	𑪐	𑪑	𑪒	𑪓	𑪔	𑪕	𑪖	𑪗	𑪘	𑪙	𑪚	𑪛	𑪜	𑪝	𑪞	𑪟
U+11AAx	𑪠	𑪡	𑪢													
Notes: 1. As of Unicode version 16.0; 2. Grey areas indicate non-assigned code points

== History ==
The following Unicode-related documents record the purpose and process of defining specific characters in the Soyombo block:

Version	Final code points (Note: Proposed code points and characters names may differ from final code points and names)	Count	L2 ID	WG2 ID	Document
10.0	U+11A50..11A83, 11A86..11A9C, 11A9E..11AA2	80	L2/98-358	N1855	Sato, T. K. (1998-08-21), Addition of Soyombo script on ISO/IEC 10646
10.0	U+11A50..11A83, 11A86..11A9C, 11A9E..11AA2	80	L2/99-010	N1903 (pdf, html, doc)	Umamaheswaran, V. S. (1998-12-30), "9.2", Minutes of WG 2 meeting 35, London, U.K.; 1998-09-21--25
10.0	U+11A50..11A83, 11A86..11A9C, 11A9E..11AA2	80	L2/00-055	N2163 (pdf, doc)	Sato, T. K. (2000-01-06), Soyombo and Pagba (old Mongol scripts)
10.0	U+11A50..11A83, 11A86..11A9C, 11A9E..11AA2	80	L2/10-399	N3949	Pandey, Anshuman (2010-10-30), Preliminary Proposal to Encode the Soyombo Script
10.0	U+11A50..11A83, 11A86..11A9C, 11A9E..11AA2	80	L2/10-467		Sharma, Shriramana (2010-11-11), Comments on Soyombo and Xawtaa Dorboljin
10.0	U+11A50..11A83, 11A86..11A9C, 11A9E..11AA2	80	L2/11-054	N3986	Pandey, Anshuman (2011-02-05), Determining the Encoding Model for Soyombo Vowels
10.0	U+11A50..11A83, 11A86..11A9C, 11A9E..11AA2	80	L2/11-125	N4026	Pandey, Anshuman (2011-04-25), Revised Preliminary Proposal to Encode Soyombo
10.0	U+11A50..11A83, 11A86..11A9C, 11A9E..11AA2	80	L2/11-412	N4142	Pandey, Anshuman (2011-10-25), Proposal to Encode the Soyombo Script
10.0	U+11A50..11A83, 11A86..11A9C, 11A9E..11AA2	80	L2/13-069	N4414	Pandey, Anshuman (2013-04-22), Revised Proposal to Encode the Soyombo Script
10.0	U+11A50..11A83, 11A86..11A9C, 11A9E..11AA2	80	L2/13-075		Sharma, Shriramana (2013-04-25), Comments on the proposed Soyombo encoding
10.0	U+11A50..11A83, 11A86..11A9C, 11A9E..11AA2	80	L2/13-086		Anderson, Deborah; McGowan, Rick; Whistler, Ken; Pournader, Roozbeh (2013-04-26), "6", Recommendations to UTC on Script Proposals
10.0	U+11A50..11A83, 11A86..11A9C, 11A9E..11AA2	80		N4403 (pdf, doc)	Umamaheswaran, V. S. (2014-01-28), "10.2.5 Soyombo script", Unconfirmed minutes of WG 2 meeting 61, Holiday Inn, Vilnius, Lithuania; 2013-06-10/14
10.0	U+11A50..11A83, 11A86..11A9C, 11A9E..11AA2	80	L2/15-004	N4655	Pandey, Anshuman (2015-01-26), Proposal to Encode the Soyombo Script
10.0	U+11A50..11A83, 11A86..11A9C, 11A9E..11AA2	80	L2/15-009	N4653	Suzuki, Toshiya; Matsukawa, Takashi; Kuribayashi, Hitoshi (2015-01-26), Comments on Proposals of Zanabazar Square and Soyombo Script from Mongolian Experts
10.0	U+11A50..11A83, 11A86..11A9C, 11A9E..11AA2	80	L2/15-045		Anderson, Deborah; Whistler, Ken; McGowan, Rick; Pournader, Roozbeh; Glass, Andrew (2015-01-30), "8. Soyombo", Recommendations to UTC #142 February 2015 on Script Proposals
10.0	U+11A50..11A83, 11A86..11A9C, 11A9E..11AA2	80	L2/15-094		Pandey, Anshuman (2015-02-09), Response to Mongolian and Japanese comments on Soyombo and Zanabazar Square
10.0	U+11A50..11A83, 11A86..11A9C, 11A9E..11AA2	80	L2/15-017		Moore, Lisa (2015-02-12), "D.7", UTC #142 Minutes
10.0	U+11A50..11A83, 11A86..11A9C, 11A9E..11AA2	80	L2/15-149		Anderson, Deborah; Whistler, Ken; McGowan, Rick; Pournader, Roozbeh; Pandey, Anshuman; Glass, Andrew (2015-05-03), "9. Soyombo", Recommendations to UTC #143 May 2015 on Script Proposals
10.0	U+11A50..11A83, 11A86..11A9C, 11A9E..11AA2	80	L2/15-249R		Anderson, Deborah (2015-10-17), Summary of Ad Hoc Meeting on Two Historical Scripts from Mongolia (Tokyo, Japan)
10.0	U+11A50..11A83, 11A86..11A9C, 11A9E..11AA2	80		N4699	Anderson, Deborah (2015-10-17), Summary of Ad Hoc Meeting on Two Historical Scripts from Mongolia (Tokyo, Japan)
10.0	U+11A50..11A83, 11A86..11A9C, 11A9E..11AA2	80	L2/15-247		Pandey, Anshuman (2015-10-20), Revised code chart and names list for Soyombo
10.0	U+11A50..11A83, 11A86..11A9C, 11A9E..11AA2	80	L2/15-248		Otgonbaatar, R.; Demberel, S. (2015-10-20), The Comments on Square script & Soyombo encoding project
10.0	U+11A50..11A83, 11A86..11A9C, 11A9E..11AA2	80	L2/15-262		Disposition of Comments on ISO/IEC CD 10646 (Ed.5), 2015-10-26
10.0	U+11A50..11A83, 11A86..11A9C, 11A9E..11AA2	80	L2/15-254		Moore, Lisa (2015-11-16), "Consensus 145-C18", UTC #145 Minutes, "Approve new Soyombo repertoire, codepoints, names, and glyphs, on the basis of CD2 draft, document L2/15-303."
10.0	U+11A50..11A83, 11A86..11A9C, 11A9E..11AA2	80	L2/15-336		Pandey, Anshuman (2015-12-07), Comments on L2/15-249 regarding Soyombo and Zanabazar Square punctuation
10.0	U+11A50..11A83, 11A86..11A9C, 11A9E..11AA2	80	L2/16-037		Anderson, Deborah; Whistler, Ken; McGowan, Rick; Pournader, Roozbeh; Glass, Andrew; Iancu, Laurențiu (2016-01-22), "8.c, 9", Recommendations to UTC #146 January 2016 on Script Proposals
10.0	U+11A50..11A83, 11A86..11A9C, 11A9E..11AA2	80		N4739	"M64.05k", Unconfirmed minutes of WG 2 meeting 64, 2016-08-31
11.0	U+11A9D	1	L2/16-016		Pandey, Anshuman (2016-01-06), Proposal to encode the Soyombo mark PLUTA
11.0	U+11A9D	1	L2/16-004		Moore, Lisa (2016-02-01), "D.10.1", UTC #146 Minutes
12.0	U+11A84..11A85	2	L2/15-331		Pandey, Anshuman (2015-12-03), Proposal to encode JIHVAMULIYA and UPADHMANIYA for Soyombo
12.0	U+11A84..11A85	2	L2/16-037		Anderson, Deborah; Whistler, Ken; McGowan, Rick; Pournader, Roozbeh; Glass, Andrew; Iancu, Laurențiu (2016-01-22), "8. Soyombo", Recommendations to UTC #146 January 2016 on Script Proposals
12.0	U+11A84..11A85	2	L2/17-235	N4867	Pandey, Anshuman (2017-07-21), Proposal to encode JIHVAMULIYA and UPADHMANIYA for Soyombo
12.0	U+11A84..11A85	2	L2/17-222		Moore, Lisa (2017-08-11), "D.5", UTC #152 Minutes
12.0	U+11A84..11A85	2		N4953 (pdf, doc)	"M66.16g", Unconfirmed minutes of WG 2 meeting 66, 2018-03-23
