= Bogd Khanate of Mongolia =

Mongolian state from 1911–1924

Great Mongol State ᠶᠡᠬᠡ ᠮᠣᠩᠭᠣᠯ ᠤᠯᠤᠰ Их Монгол Улс Yeke Mongγol Ulus
- 1911–1919; 1921–1924
- Flag of Bogd Khaanate Mongolia from 1911 to 1924 Coat of arms
- Anthem: Зуун лангийн жороо луус ᠵᠠᠭᠤᠨ ᠯᠠᠩ ᠤᠨ ᠵᠢᠷᠤᠭ᠎ᠠ ᠯᠠᠭᠤᠰᠠ; Zuun Langiin Joroo Luus; The Hundred-Tael Pacing Mule
- Imperial seal

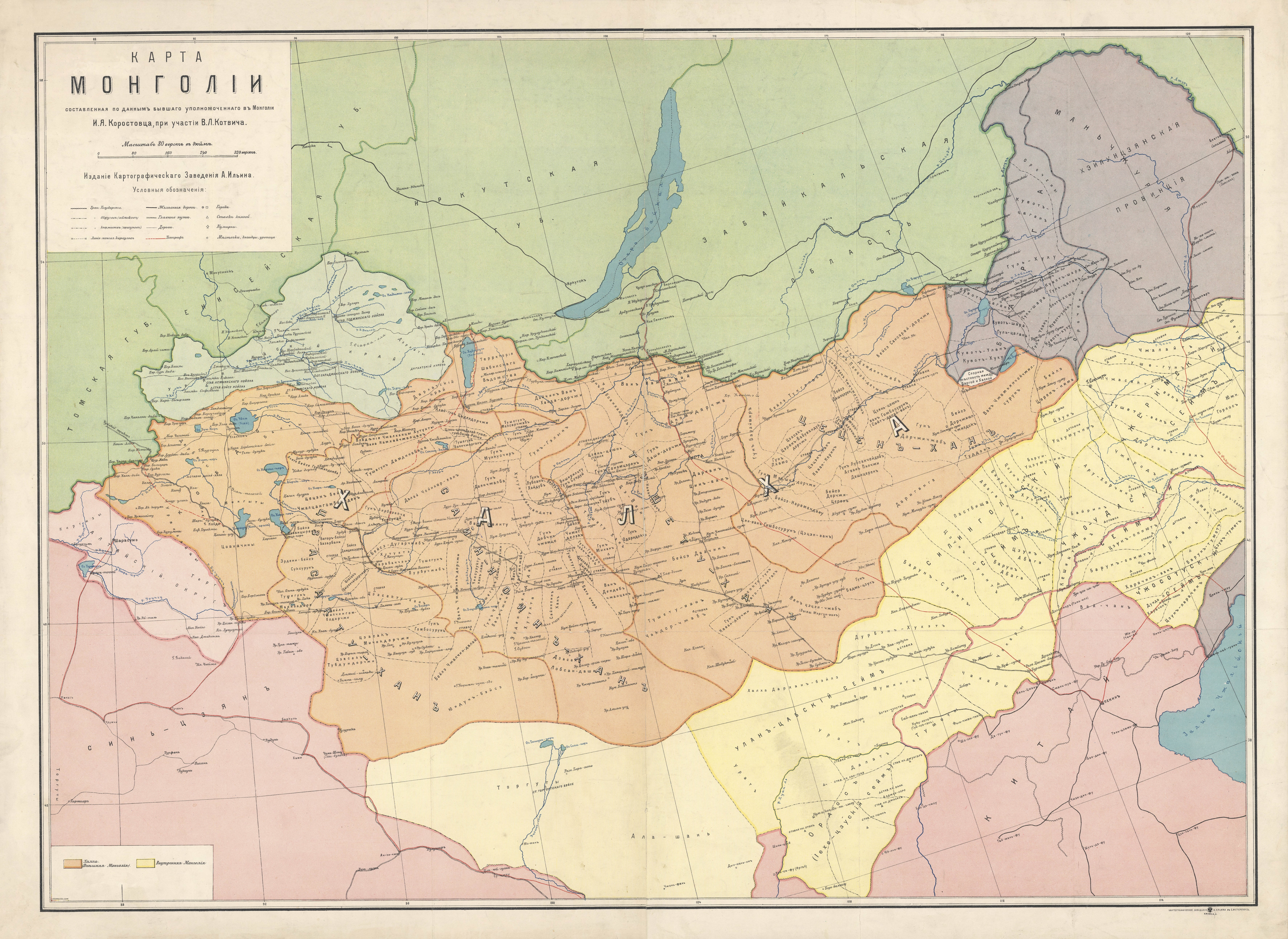
- Outer Mongolia in 1914, shown in orange
- Status: Partially recognised state (Note: Only recognized by the Russian SFSR (1921–1922), USSR (1922–1924), and Tibet (a de-facto independent state)); Autonomous state under the Republic of China (1915–1919); Military occupation under the Republic of China (1919–1921)
- Capital: Niislel Khüree (present-day Ulaanbaatar)
- Official languages: Mongolian
- Common languages: Tuvan, Kazakh, Mandarin
- Religion: Tibetan Buddhism (state religion), Tengrism, Mongolian shamanism
- Government: Unitary Buddhist absolute monarchy
- De facto leader
  - 1921: Roman von Ungern-Sternberg
- Khan
  - 1911–1919 1921–1924: Bogd Khan
- Prime Minister
  - 1912–1919 (first): Tögs-Ochiryn Namnansüren Sain Noyon Khan
  - 1923–1924 (last): Balingiin Tserendorj
- Legislature: None (rule by decree) (1911–1914; 1921–1924); State Khural (1914–1919)
- History
  - Proclamation of independence: 1 December 1911
  - Enthronement of Bogd Khan: 29 December 1911
  - Autonomy under Chinese suzerainty and Russian influence: 17 June 1915
  - Autonomy revoked: 1919–1921
  - 1921 Revolution: 1 March 1921
  - Soviet intervention: 1921–1924
  - MPR proclaimed: 26 November 1924
- Currency: Tael, Mongolian dollar
- ISO 3166 code: MN
Preceded by	Succeeded by
1911: Qing dynasty; 1921: Republic of China	1919: Republic of China; 1924: Mongolian; People's Republic
- Today part of: Mongolia; Russia

The Bogd Khanate of Mongolia was a Mongolian state that existed from 1911 to 1919 and was restored from 1921 to 1924. "Bogd Khanate" is a conventional name used in modern historiography; contemporary Mongolian documents frequently referred to the polity as the Great Mongol State (Их Монгол Улс; Classical Mongolian: Yeke Mongγol Ulus), and used related forms for its government and ruler.

During the collapse of the Qing dynasty in 1911, Mongol princes and lamas in Khüree formed a provisional government and moved toward independence. On 1 December 1911, the provisional government issued a proclamation announcing Mongolia's independence and stating that Mongolia had originally been an independent polity. On 29 December, the eighth Jebtsundamba Khutuktu was enthroned as Bogd Khaan, combining religious and political authority, and a new central government was inaugurated. His reign title was Olon-a Örgügdegsen (Олноо өргөгдсөн, "Elevated by All").

The government sought to consolidate its authority in Khalkha and western Mongolia while also pursuing the political unification of Mongols in other former Qing territories, including Mongol banners in present-day Inner Mongolia, Barga and Hulunbuir, Alasha, Köke Nuur and other regions. Contemporary documents associated this movement with the Great Mongol State and, in some cases, with succession to the earlier state founded by Chinggis Khaan. Responses among Mongol princes and banners varied, and the attempt at wider political unification ultimately failed.

The Russian Empire supported Mongolian autonomy but did not support the full independence and territorial programme pursued by the Mongolian government. Under the Kyakhta Agreement of 1915, Mongolia accepted autonomous status under Chinese suzerainty while retaining its own government. Mongolian autonomy was abolished by Chinese authorities in 1919. In 1921, Bogd Khaan's monarchy was restored during the Mongolian Revolution of 1921, and it continued alongside the new revolutionary government until his death in 1924. The Mongolian People's Republic was proclaimed later that year.

== Name ==
"Bogd Khanate of Mongolia" is a conventional name used in modern historiography for the state ruled by Bogd Khaan. Contemporary Mongolian documents used several forms for the polity and its government. One frequently attested name was Great Mongol State (Их Монгол Улс; Classical Mongolian: Yeke Mongγol Ulus), the same name historically used for the state founded by Chinggis Khaan.

Contemporary documents refer to the newly established polity as Ikh Mongol Uls, its government as the Government of the Great Mongol State, and its ruler as the Bogd Khaan of the Great Mongol State. Related expressions such as Ikh Mongol ulsyn tör, Ikh Mongolyn tör and Ikh tör were also used for the government or political order. Chinese-language sources rendered the name as 大蒙古國 (Dà Měnggǔguó, "Great Mongol State").

Olon-a Örgügdegsen (Олноо өргөгдсөн, "Elevated by All") was the reign or era title adopted upon Bogd Khaan's enthronement on 29 December 1911, rather than simply the name of the state.

The term "Bogd Khanate" therefore describes the period of Bogd Khaan's rule, while contemporary sources commonly referred to the polity itself as Mongolia or the Great Mongol State.

== Mongolian Revolution of 1911 ==
On 2 February 1913. the Bogd Khanate sent Mongolian cavalry forces to liberate Inner Mongolia from China. The Russian Empire refused to sell weapons to the Bogd Khanate, and Russian Tsar Nicholas II spoke of "Mongolian imperialism". The only country to recognize Mongolia as a legitimate state was Tibet, which also declared its independence from Qing China. Tibet and Mongolia later signed a friendship treaty and affirmed mutual recognition.

== Government and society ==
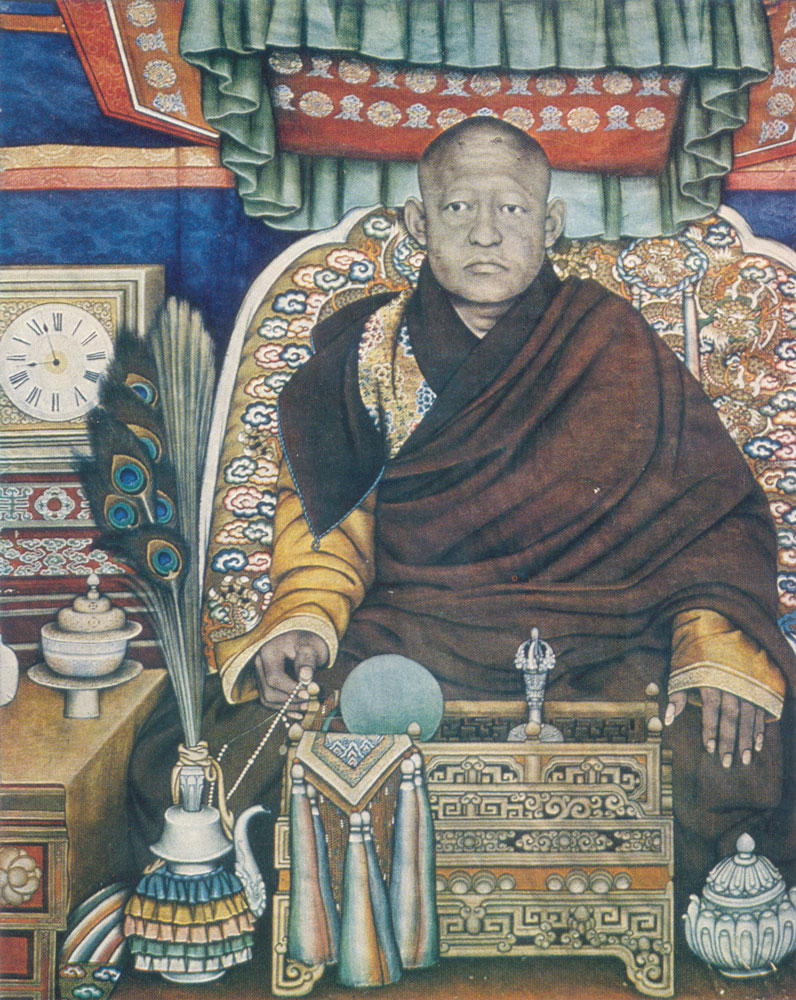
The Bogd Khaan

At the time, the government was still composed of a feudal Khanate, which held its system in place largely with the power of agriculture, as most traditional pastoral societies of East Asia had been. The new Mongolian state was a fusion of very different elements: Western political institutions, Mongolian theocracy, and Qing imperial administrative and political traditions. 29 December was declared to be independence day and a national holiday. Urga (modern Ulaanbaatar), until then known to the Mongolians as the "Great Monastery" (Ikh khüree), was renamed "Capital Monastery" (Niislel khüree) to reflect its new role as the seat of government. A state name, "Great Mongolian State" (Ikh Mongol uls), and a state flag were adopted. A parliament (ulsyn khural) was created, comprising upper and lower houses. A new Mongolian government was formed with five ministries: internal affairs, foreign affairs, finance, justice, and the army. Consequently, a national army was created.

The new state also reflected old ways; the Bogd Khaan adopted a reign title, "Elevated by the Many" (Olnoo örgogdsön), a style name used (it was believed) by the ancient kings of Tibet. He promoted the ruling princes and lamas by one grade, an act traditionally performed by newly installed Chinese emperors. Lay and religious princes were instructed to render their annual tribute, the "nine whites". By tradition the "nine whites" were eight white horses and one white camel. On this occasion, the "nine whites" consisted of 3,500 horses and 200 camels sent to the Bogd Khaan instead of the Qing Emperor as in the past. Again, the Bogd Khaan appropriated to himself the right to confer ranks and seals of office upon the Mongolian nobility.

The Bogd Khaan himself was the inevitable choice as leader of the state in view of his stature as the revered symbol of Buddhism in Mongolia. He was famed throughout the country for his special oracular and supernatural powers and as the Great Khan of Mongols. He established contacts with foreign powers, tried to assist development of economy (mainly agriculture and military issues), but his main goal was development of Buddhism in Mongolia.

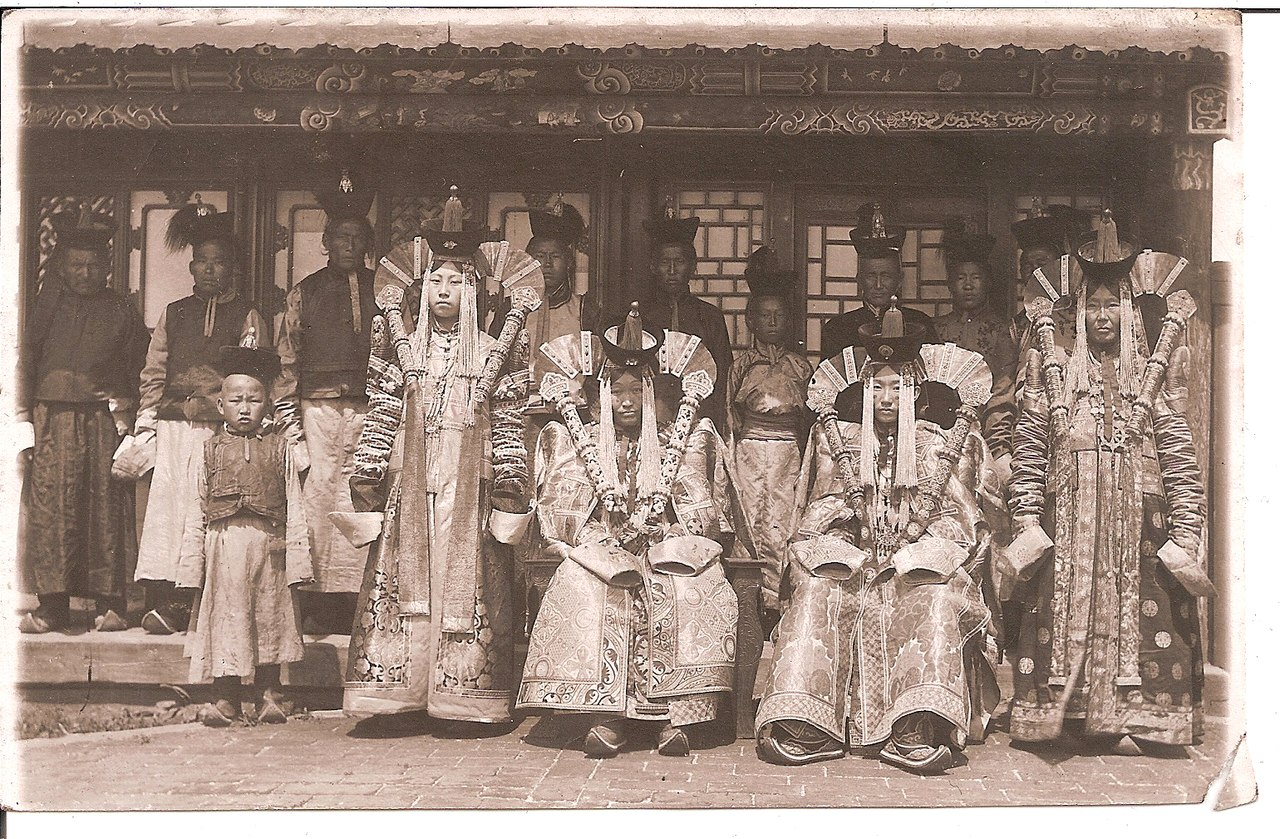
Ladies at court Bogd Khanate.

The new state was theocratic, and its system suited Mongols, but it was not economically efficient as the leaders were inexperienced in such matters. The Qing dynasty had been careful to check the encroachment of religion into the secular arena; that restraint was now gone. State policy was directed by religious leaders, with relatively little participation by lay nobles. The parliament had only consultative powers; in any event, it did not meet until 1914. The Office of Religion and State, an extra-governmental body headed by a lama, played a role in directing political matters. The Ministry of Internal Affairs was vigilant in ensuring that senior ecclesiastics were treated with solemn deference by lay persons.

The head of the Bogd Khaan's Ecclesiastical Administration (Shav' yamen) endeavoured to transfer as many wealthy herdsmen as he could to the ecclesiastical estate (Ikh shav'), resulting in the population bearing an increasingly heavy tax burden. Ten-thousand Buddha statuettes were purchased in 1912 as propitiatory offerings to restore the Bogd Khaan's eyesight. A cast-iron statue of the Buddha, 84 feet tall, was brought from Dolonnor, and a temple was constructed to house the statue. D. Tsedev, pp. 49–50. In 1914 the Ecclesiastical Administration ordered the government to defray the costs of a particular religious ceremony in the amount of 778,000 bricks of tea (the currency of the day), a gigantic sum.

Ministers in the Bogd Khan's Government

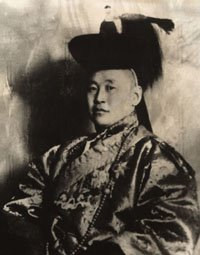
Prime Minister Tögs-Ochiryn Namnansüren

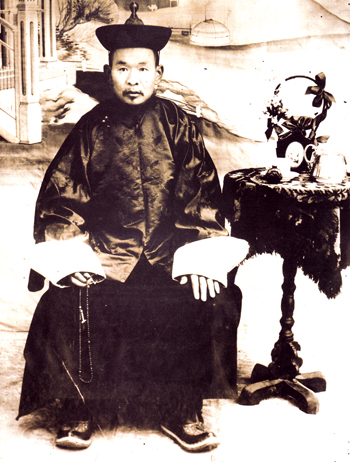
Interior Minister Da Lam Tserenchimed

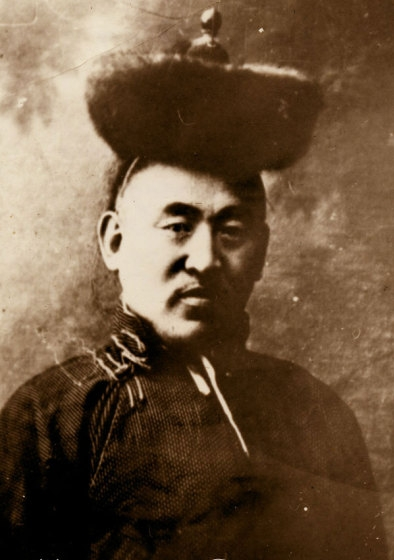
Foreign Minister Mijiddorjiin Khanddorj

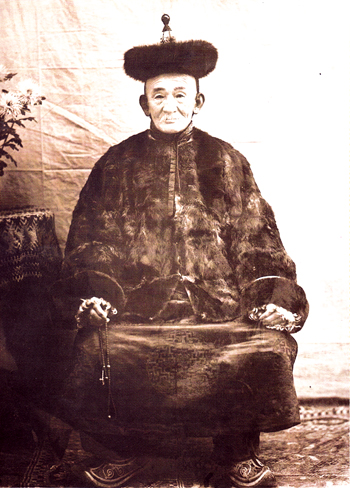
Minister of Religion and State Gonchigjalzangiin Badamdorj

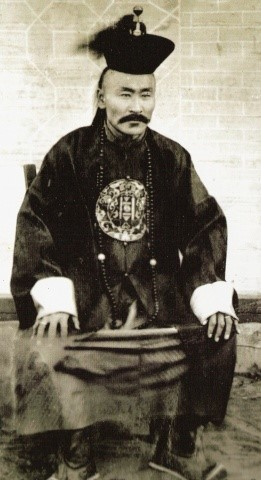
Deputy Foreign Minister Manlaibaatar Damdinsüren

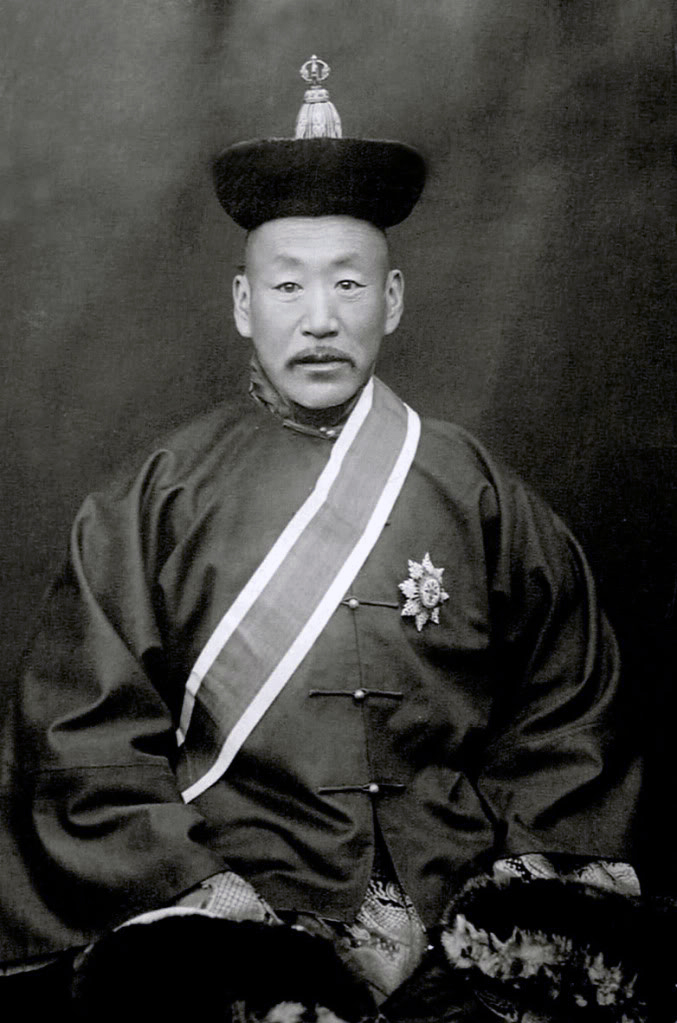
Minister for the Pacification of the Western Border Areas Sodnomyn Damdinbazar

=== Administrative divisions ===
Bogd Khanate was divided into four aimags and two khyadzgaars (хязгаар):

- Zasagt Khan aimag (Засагт хан аймаг)
- Tüsheet Khan aimag (Түшээт хан аймаг)
- Setsen Khan aimag (Сэцэн хан аймаг)
- Sain Noyon Khan aimag (Сайн ноён хан аймаг)
- Khovd khyazgaar (Ховдын хязгаар)
  - Dörvöd Dalai Khan aimag (Дөрвөд Далай хан аймаг)
  - Ünen Zorigt Khan aimag (Үнэн Зоригт Хан аймаг)
- Tagna Uryankhay khyadzgaar (Тагнын Урианхайн хязгаар) independent country, annexed by Russia in 1914.

== Diplomatic maneuvering over Mongolia ==
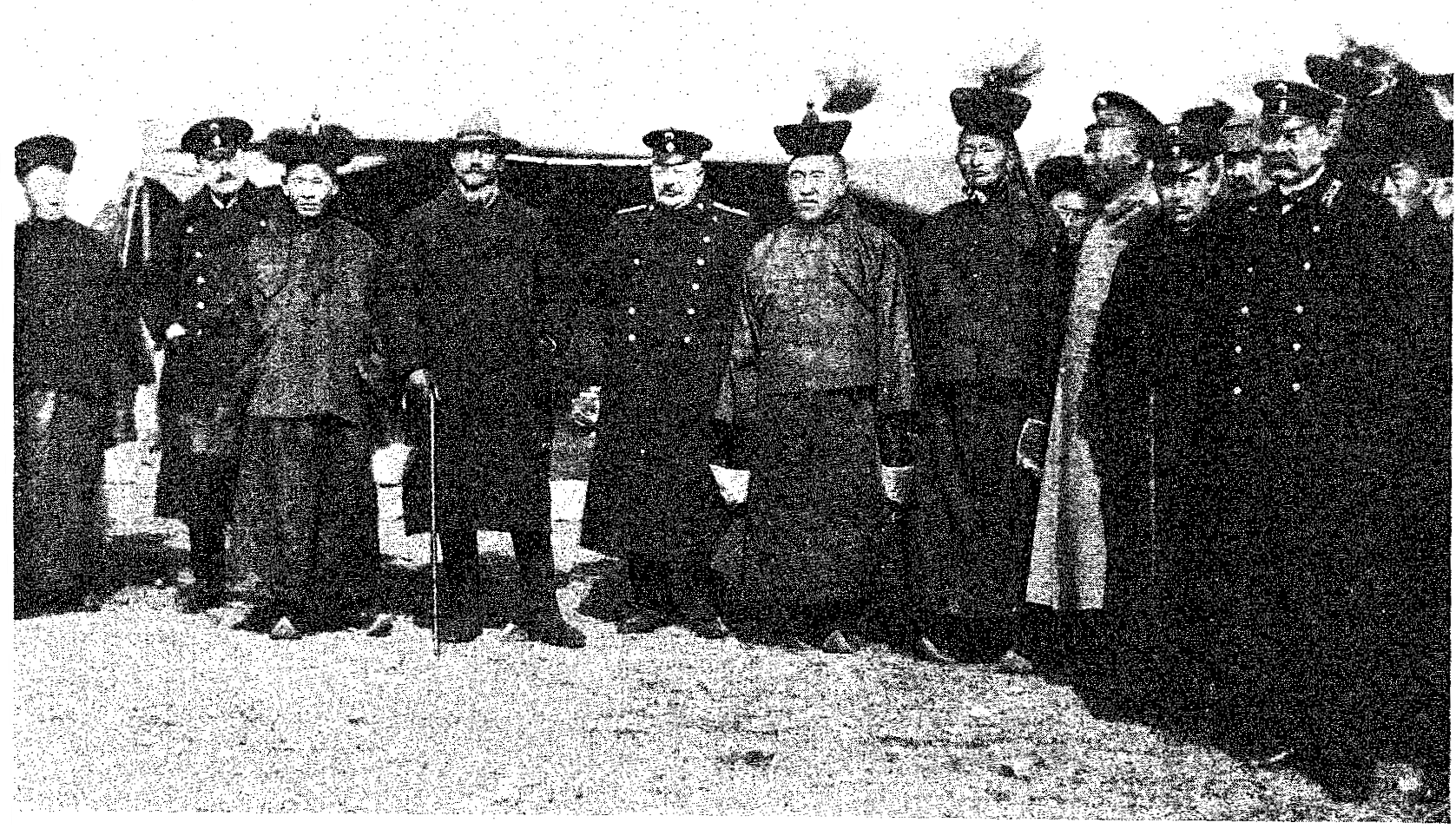
The Russian plenipotentiary M. Korostovetz greeted on his arrival, by the Mongol princes and cabinet ministers, at Urga in September, 1912

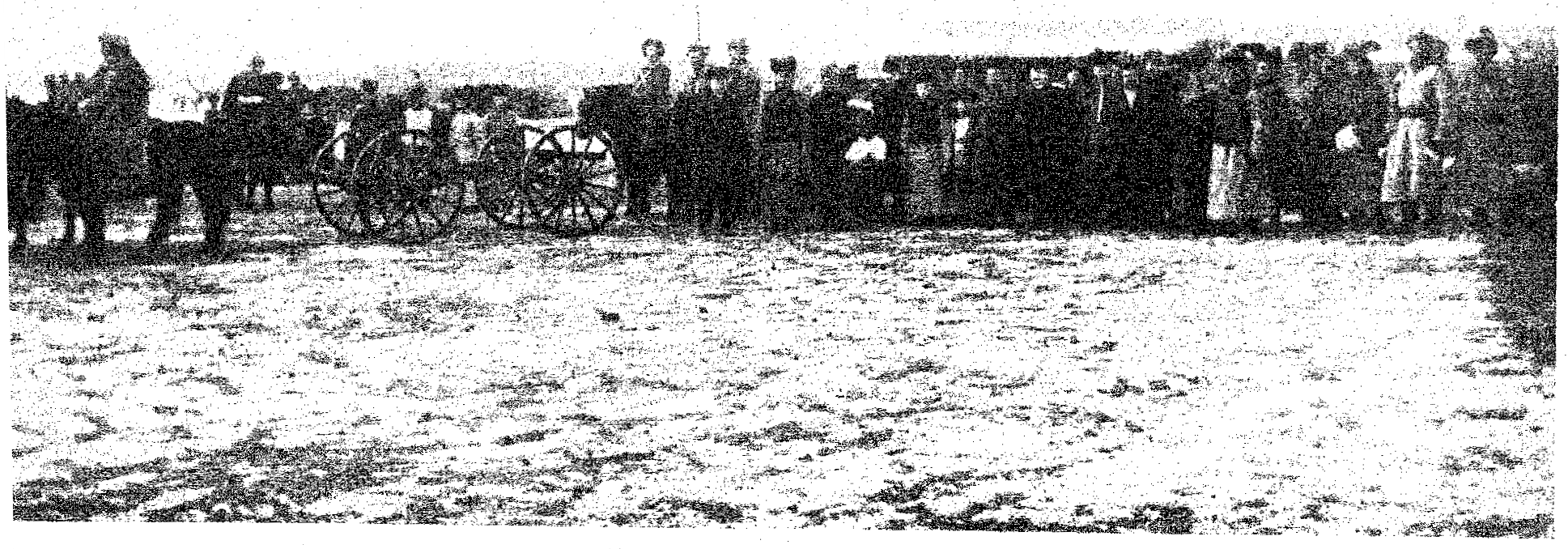
Parade for first Russian-drilled Mongolian battery of artillery in the presence of the Russian plenipotentiary and the Mongol princes and ministers

The new government under Bogd Khan tried to seek international recognition, particularly from the Russian government. The Tsar however, rejected the Mongolian plea for recognition, due to a common Russian Imperial ambition at the time to take over the central Asian states, and Mongolia was planned for further expansion. Throughout the Bogd Khaan era, the positions of the governments of China and Russia were clear and consistent. China was adamant that Mongolia was, and must remain, an integral part of China. The (provisional) constitution of the new Chinese republic contained an uncompromising statement to this effect. A law dealing with the election of the Chinese National Assembly provided for delegates from Outer Mongolia. For their part, the Russian Imperial government accepted the principle that Mongolia must remain formally part of China; however, Russia was equally determined that Mongolia possess autonomous powers so substantial as to make it quasi-independent, so they recognised the autonomy of the region. The Russian Empire could not act on the ambition due to internal struggles, which allowed Russia to claim that Mongolia was under her protection. Thus, in 1912 Russia concluded a secret convention with the Empire of Japan delineating their respective spheres of influence: South Manchuria and Inner Mongolia fell to the Japanese, North Manchuria and Outer Mongolia to the Russians. Bogd Khaan said to Yuan Shikai, the President of the Republic of China "I established our own state before you, Mongols and Chinese have different origins, our languages and scripts are different. You're not the Manchu's descendants, so how can you think China is the Manchu's successor?".

In spite of Chinese and Russian opposition, the Mongols were tireless in their efforts to attract international recognition of their independence. Diplomatic notes were sent to foreign consulates in Hailar; none responded. A delegation went to Saint Petersburg the purpose of which, among other things, was to contact European ambassadors expressing the desire for diplomatic relations. The Russians did not permit these contacts. A later delegation to Saint Petersburg sent notes to Western ambassadors announcing Mongolia's independence and formation of a pan-Mongolian state; again none responded. The Mongols attempted to send a delegation to Japan but the Japanese consul at Harbin prevented it from proceeding further.

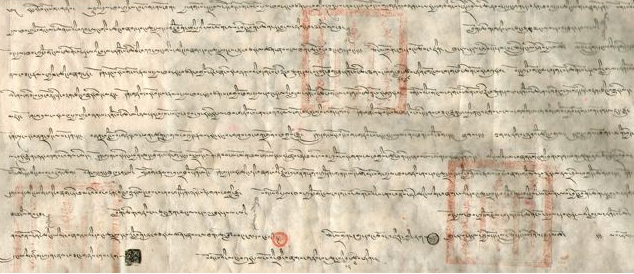
Tibet–Mongolian Friendship Treaty

While these efforts at obtaining international recognition continued, the Mongols and Russians were negotiating. At the end of 1912, Russia and the Mongols signed a treaty by which Russia acknowledged Mongol autonomy within the Republic of China; it also provided for Russian assistance in the training of a new Mongolian army and for Russian commercial privileges in Mongolia. Nevertheless, in the equivalent Mongolian version of the treaty, the terms designated independence were used. Both versions have the same value; so it was formally recognition of Mongolia as an independent state and its name Great Mongolian State. In 1913 Russia agreed to provide Mongolia with weapons and a loan of two million rubles. In 1913, Mongolia and Tibet signed a bilateral treaty, recognizing each other as independent states.

In November 1913, there was a Sino-Russian Declaration which recognised Mongolia as part of China but with internal autonomy; further, China agreed not to send troops or officials to Mongolia, or to permit colonization of the country; it was also to accept the "good offices" of Russia in Chinese-Mongolian affairs. There was to be a tripartite conference, in which Russia, China, and the "authorities" of Mongolia would participate. This declaration was not considered by Mongolia to be legitimate as the Mongolian government had not participated in the decision.

To reduce tensions, the Russians agreed to provide Mongolia with more weapons and a second loan, this time three million rubles. There were other agreements between Russia and Mongolia in these early years concerning weapons, military instructors, telegraph, and railroad that were either concluded or nearly so by the outbreak of the First World War in 1914. In April 1914, the northern region of Tannu Uriankhai was formally accepted as a Russian protectorate.

=== Kyakhta Agreement of 1915 ===
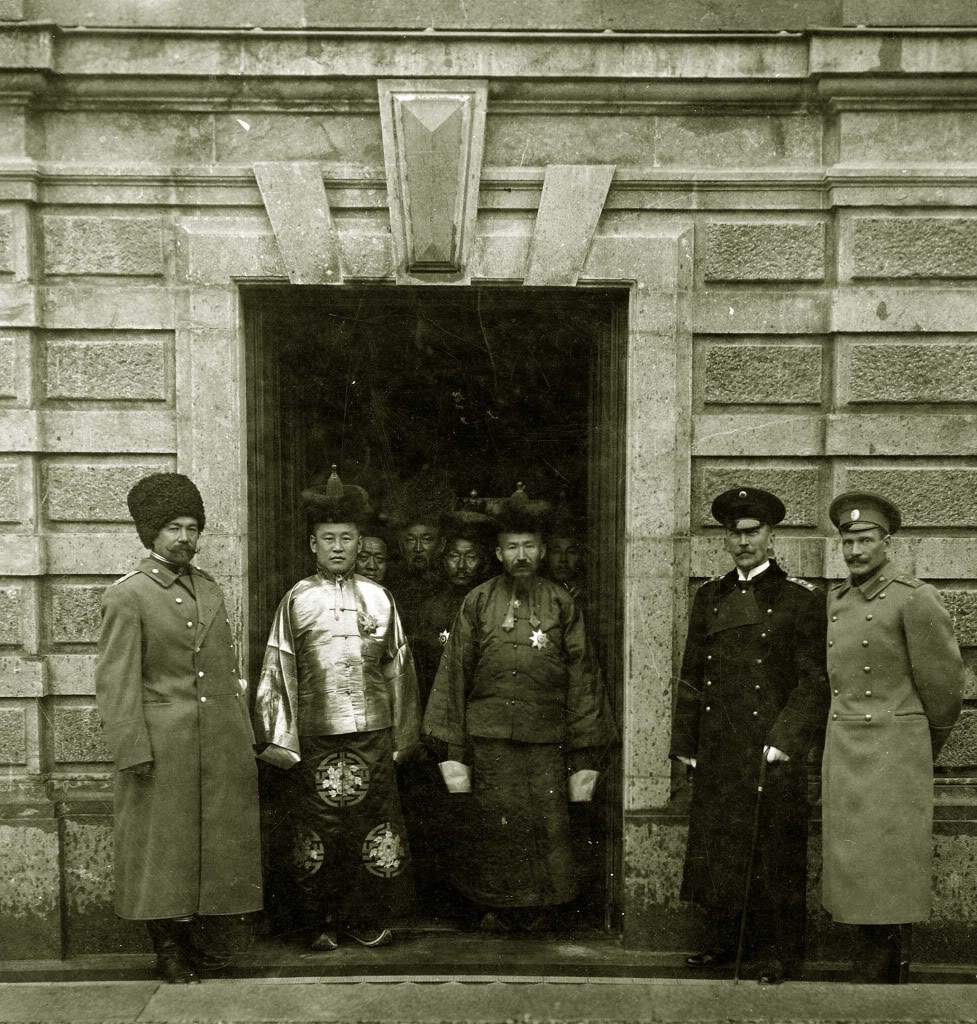
Namnansüren in delegation to St. Petersburg

A tripartite conference between the Russian Empire, Republic of China and the Bogd Khaan's government convened at Kyakhta in the autumn of 1914. The Mongolian representative, Prime Minister Tögs-Ochiryn Namnansüren, were determined to stretch autonomy into independence, and to deny the Chinese anything more than vague, ineffectual suzerain powers. The Chinese sought to minimize, if not to end, Mongolian autonomy. The Russian position was somewhere in between. The result was the Kyakhta Treaty of June 1915, which recognised Mongolia's autonomy within the Chinese state. Nevertheless, Outer Mongolia remained effectively outside Chinese control and retained main features of the state according to international law of that time.

The Mongolians viewed the treaty as a disaster because it denied the recognition of a truly independent, all-Mongolian state. China regarded the treaty in a similar fashion, consenting only because it was preoccupied with other international problems, especially Japan. The treaty did contain one significant feature which the Chinese were later to turn to their advantage; the right to appoint a high commissioner to Urga and deputy high commissioners to Uliastai, Khovd, and Kyakhta. This provided a senior political presence in Mongolia, which had been lacking.

== Decline of Russian influence ==
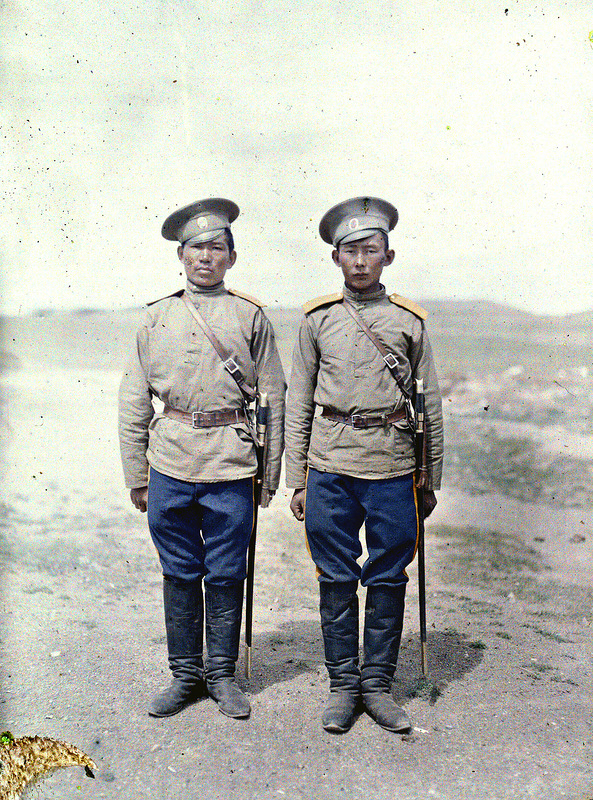
Two Cossacks in gymnastyorka uniform, in Khüree c. 1913.

In 1913, the Russian consulate in Urga began publishing a journal titled Shine tol' (the New Mirror), the purpose of which was to project a positive image of Russia. Its editor, a Buryat-born scholar and statesman Tsyben Zhamtsarano, turned it into a platform for advocating political and social change. Lamas were incensed over the first issue, which denied that the world was flat; another issue severely criticized the Mongolian nobility for its exploitation of ordinary people. Medical and veterinary services, part of Russian-sponsored reforms, met resistance from the lamas as this had been their prerogative. Mongols regarded as annoying the efforts of the Russians to oversee use of the second loan (the Russians believed the first had been profligately spent) and to reform the state budgetary system. The Russian diplomat Alexander Miller, appointed in 1913, proved to be a poor choice as he had little respect for most Mongolian officials, whom he regarded as incompetent in the extreme. The chief Russian military instructor successfully organized a Mongolian military brigade. Soldiers from this brigade manifested themselves later on in combat against Chinese troops.

The outbreak of the World War I in 1914 required Russia to redirect its energies to Europe. By the middle of 1915, the Russian military position had deteriorated so badly that the Russian government had no choice but to neglect its Asian interests. China soon took advantage of the Russian distractions which increased dramatically following the Bolshevik revolution in 1917.

== Chinese attempts to conquer Mongolia ==
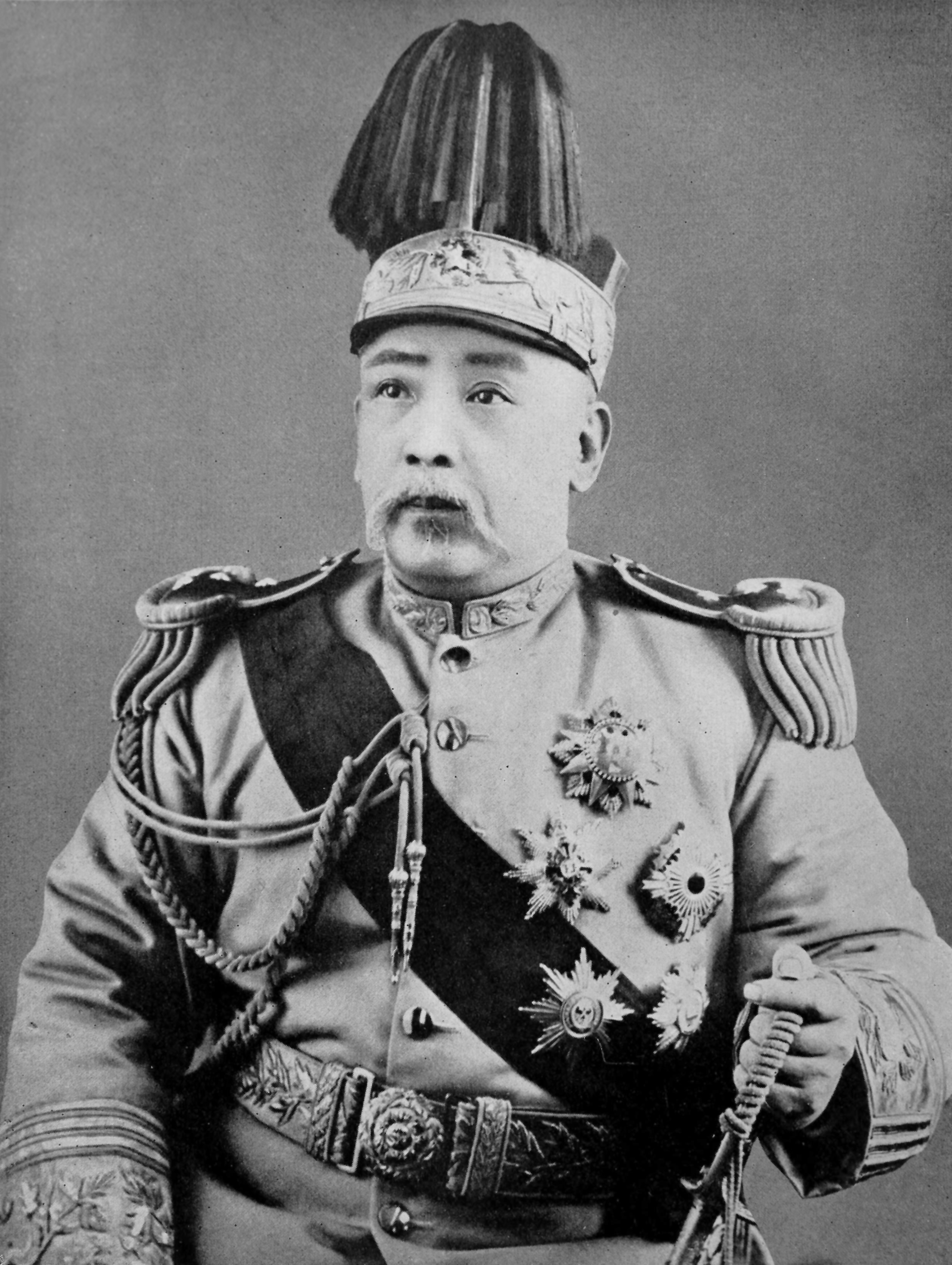
Yuan Shikai, the President of the Republic of China

In December 1915, Yuan Shikai, the President of the Republic of China, sent gifts to the Bogd Khaan and his wife. In return, the Bogd Khaan dispatched a delegation of 30 persons to Beijing with gifts for Yuan: four white horses and two camels (his wife Ekh Dagina sent four black horses and two camels). The delegation was received by Yuan Shikai himself, now proclaimed ruler of a restored Empire of China. The delegation met Yuan Shikai on 10 February 1916. In China this was interpreted in the context of the traditional tributary system, when all missions with gifts to Chinese rulers were considered as signs of submission. In this regard, Chinese sources stated that a year later, the Bogd Khaan agreed to participate in an investiture ceremony – a formal Qing ritual by which frontier nobles received the patent and seal of imperial appointment to office; Yuan awarded him China's highest decoration of merit; lesser but significant decorations were awarded to other senior Mongolian princes. Actually, after the conclusion of the Kyakhta agreement in 1914, Yuan Shikai sent a telegram to the Bogd Khaan informing him that he was bestowed a title of "Bogd Jevzundamba Khutuktu Khaan of Outer Mongolia" and would be provided with a golden seal and a golden diploma. The Bogd Khaan responded: "Since the title of Bogd Jevzundamba Khutuktu Khaan of Outer Mongolia was already bestowed by the Ikh Juntan, there was no need to bestow it again and that since there was no provision on the golden seal and golden diploma in the tripartite agreement, his government was not in a position to receive them". The Bogd Khaan had already been granted said golden seal, title and diploma by the Qing dynasty.

== Revolution and civil war in Russia ==
The Bolshevik revolution in 1917 and the resultant outbreak of civil war in Russia provided new opportunities for China to move into Mongolia. The Bolsheviks established workers' councils in Siberia, a process essentially completed by the summer of 1918. The presence of the Bolsheviks so close to the Mongolian border unsettled both the Mongolians and the Chinese High Commissioner, Chen Yi. Rumours were rife of Bolshevik troops preparing to invade Mongolia. The Cossack consular guards at Urga, Uliastai, and Khovd, traditionally loyal to the Imperial House of Romanov, had mutinied and left. The Russian communities in Mongolia were themselves becoming fractious, some openly supporting the new Bolshevik regime. The pretext was the penetration of the White Russian troops from Siberia. Chen Yi sent telegrams to Beijing requesting troops and, after several efforts, was able to persuade the Bogd Khaan's government to agree to the introduction of one battalion. By July 1918, the Soviet threat from Siberia had faded and the Mongolian foreign minister told Chen Yi that troops were no longer needed. Nevertheless, the Chinese battalion continued to move and in August arrived to Urga.

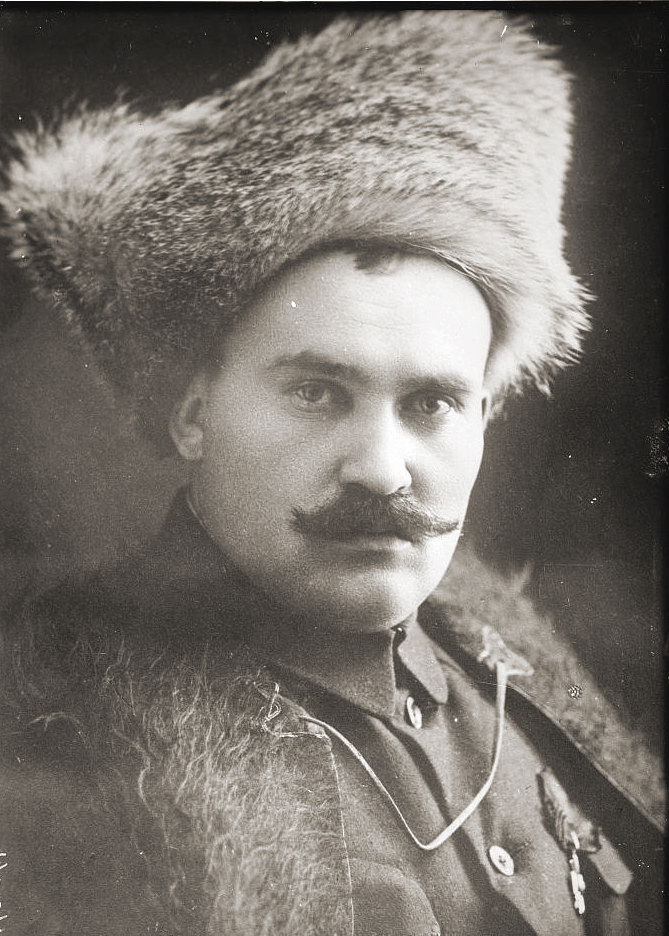
Grigory Semyonov

Anti-Bolshevik forces in Asia were fragmented into a number of regiments. One was led by the Supreme Commander of the Baikal Cossacks, Grigory Semyonov, who had assembled a detachment of Buryats and Inner Mongolian nationalists for the creation of a pan-Mongolian state. Semyonov and his allies made several unsuccessful efforts to encourage the Bogd Khaan's government to join it. The Khalkha people regarded themselves as the natural leaders of all Mongols and feared being submerged into a new political system that likely would be led by Buryats, whom the Khalkhas deeply mistrusted. When inducements failed, Semyonov threatened to invade Mongolia to force compliance.

The Bogd Khaanate was in a difficult position. On the one hand, it lacked the strength to repel a pan-Mongolist attack; on the other, they were profoundly disquieted by the thought of more Chinese troops in Mongolia. The first detachment of Chinese troops arrived to Urga in July 1919. Prince N.A Kudashev, the old Imperial Russian ambassador to Beijing, indicated a violation of the Kyakhta Agreement by China. This step in conflict with the Kyakhta agreement was considered by the Chinese as the first step toward Chinese sovereignty over Mongolia. In any event, the threatened pan-Mongolian invasion never materialized because of dissension between the Buryats and Inner Mongolians, and Semyonov's dream of a pan-Mongolian state died.

== Abolition of Mongolian autonomy ==
On 4 August 1919, an assembly of princes took place in Urga to discuss Semyonov's invitation to join the pan-Mongolian movement; this was because Khalkhas were threatened by a pan-Mongolist group of one Mongolian and two Buryat regiments advancing from Dauria. While that military campaign failed, China continued to increase troop numbers in Mongolia. On 13 August 1919 Commissioner Chen Yi received a message from "representatives of the four aimags", requesting that China come to Mongolia's aid against Semyonov; it also expressed the desire of the Khalkha nobility to restore the previous Qing system. Among other things, they proposed that the five ministries of the Mongolian government be placed under the direct supervision of the Chinese high commission rather than the Bogd Khaan. According to an Associated Press dispatch, some Mongol chieftains signed a petition asking China to retake administration of Mongolia and end Outer Mongolia's autonomy.

Pressure from Chen Yi on Mongolian princes followed; representatives of the Bogd Khaan also participated in negotiations. Eventually, the princes agreed on a long list of principles, sixty-four points "On respecting of Outer Mongolia by the government of China and improvement of her position in future after self-abolishing of autonomy". This document offered the replacement of the Mongolian government with Chinese officials, the introduction of Chinese garrisons and keeping of feudal titles. According to ambassador Kudashev, the majority of princes supported the abolition of autonomy. The Bogd Khaan sent a delegation to the President of China with a letter complaining that the plan to abolish autonomy was a contrivance of the High Commissioner alone and not the wish of the people of Mongolia. On 28 October 1919, the Chinese National Assembly approved the articles. President Xu Shichang sent a conciliatory letter to the Bogd Khaan, pledging respect for Mongolian feelings and reverence for the Jebtsundamba Khututktu and the Buddhist faith.

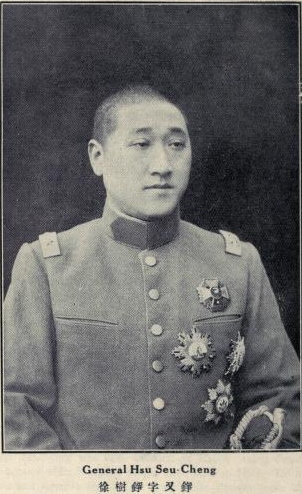
General Xu Shuzheng

A few months earlier the Chinese government had appointed as new Northwest Frontier Commissioner Xu Shuzheng, an influential warlord and prominent member of the pro-Japanese Anhui clique in the Chinese National Assembly. Xu had a vision for Mongolia very different from that reflected in the Sixty-four points. It presented a vast plan for reconstruction. Arriving with a military escort in Urga on 29 October, he informed the Mongolians that the Sixty-four points would need to be renegotiated. He submitted a much tougher set of conditions, the "Eight Articles," calling for the express declaration of Chinese sovereignty over Mongolia, an increase in Mongolia's population (presumably through Chinese colonization), and the promotion of commerce, industry, and agriculture. The Mongols resisted, prompting Xu to threaten to deport the Bogd Khaan to China if he did not immediately agree to the conditions. To emphasize the point, Xu placed troops in front of the Bogd Khaan's palace. The Japanese were the ones who ordered these pro-Japanese Chinese warlords to occupy Mongolia to halt a possibly revolutionary spillover from the Russian revolutionaries into Mongolia and Northern China. After the Chinese completed the occupation, the Japanese then abandoned them and left them on their own.

The Eight Articles were placed before the Mongolian Parliament on 15 November. The upper house accepted the Articles; the lower house did not, with some members calling for armed resistance, if necessary. The Buddhist monks resisted most of all, but the nobles of the upper house prevailed. A petition to end autonomy, signed by the ministers and deputy ministers of the Bogd Khaan's government, was presented to Xu. The Bogd Khaan refused to affix his seal until compelled by the fact that new Prime Minister Gonchigjalzangiin Badamdorj, installed by order of Xu Shuzheng, and conservative forces were accepting the Chinese demands. The office of the high commission was abolished, and Chen Yi was recalled. Xu's success was broadly celebrated in China. 1 January and the following days were declared holidays and all governmental institutions in Beijing and in the provinces were closed.

Xu Shuzheng returned to Mongolia in December for the Bogd Khaan's "investiture", which took place on 1 January 1920. It was an elaborate ceremony: Chinese soldiers lined both sides of the road to the palace; the portrait of the President of China was borne on a palanquin, followed by the national flag of China and a marching band of cymbals and drums. Mongols were obliged to prostrate themselves before these emblems of Chinese sovereignty. That night herdsmen and lamas gathered outside the palace and angrily tore down the flags of the Chinese Republic hanging from the gate.

Xu moved immediately to implement the Eight Articles. The doors of the former Mongolian ministries were locked, and Chinese sentries posted in front. A new government of eight departments was formed. The Mongolian army was demobilized, its arsenal seized, and both lay and religious officials banned from using the words "Mongolian state" (Mongol uls) in their official correspondence.

The Tusiyetu Khan Aimak's Prince Darchin Ch'in Wang was a supporter of Chinese rule while his younger brother Tsewang was a supporter of Ungern-Sternberg.

== See also ==
- Mongolia under Qing rule
- Occupation of Mongolia
- Mongolian Revolution of 1921
- Mongolian People's Republic
