= Emblem of Mongolia =

State Emblem of Mongolia
- Armiger: Mongolia
- Adopted: 12 February 1992

The national emblem of Mongolia (Note: Mongolian: Монгол Улсын төрийн сүлд, romanized: Mongol Ulsiin töriin süld, IPA: [ˈmɔɴɢɞɮ ʊɬˈsʲiːɴ tʰɵˈriːɴ suɬt]) is used by the government of Mongolia as one of its three state symbols—the others being the flag and anthem. It is officially used for example on documents such as Mongolian passports, and government and embassy placards.

== Description ==
The state emblem was adopted on 13 January 1992, when the new constitution came into force. The details of it are laid out in Chapter 1, Article 12(3) of the Constitution of Mongolia.

The outer rim features a tumen nasan, symbolizing eternity, surrounding a circular blue field, symbolizing the sky. On the centre of the field is a combination of the Soyombo symbol and the wind horse (treasured steed), symbolizing Mongolia's independence, sovereignty, and spirit. Sun, moon and fire symbols derived from the Xiongnu. Above the field is a Cintamani (Чандмань), representing the Mahayana Buddhist Three Jewels, which in Mongolian folklore grants wishes. Below the central emblem is a green mountain range, with the Wheel of Dharma (Хүрд) at the center. On the bottom of the mountain range and wheel is a khadag (Хадаг), a ceremonial scarf.

== History ==
From 1960 to 1991, the Mongolian People's Republic used an emblem with a very similar shape, but with several differing elements. Instead of the Wind Horse, a horseman on a normal horse is shown. In the background, the sun rises above mountains. The Mahayana Buddhist symbols are replaced by symbols of Socialism. A gearwheel stands for industrialization, sheaves around the perimeter stand for the farming class, and the top featured a red star with the socialist version of the Soyombo. Along the bottom, a blue-red ribbon is placed in front of the gearwheel, with the letters БНМАУ, the abbreviation for Бүгд Найрамдах Монгол Ард Улс ('Mongolian People's Republic').

Before 1961, the emblem did not bear most of the socialist symbols. The horseman carried a long lasso pole and the heads of four types of herd animals were shown on the sides. A red ribbon at the bottom bore the name of the country in the traditional Mongolian alphabet between 1940 and 1949 with the Cyrillic abbreviation after that.

Soyombo of the Bogd Khanate (1911–1924)

State emblem of Mongolian People's Republic (1924–1940)

State emblem of Mongolian People's Republic
(30 June 1940 – 12 September 1949)

State emblem of Mongolian People's Republic
(12 September 1949 – 6 July 1960)

State emblem of the People's Republic of Mongolia
(6 July 1960 – 12 February 1992)

== See also ==
- Emblem of Sri Lanka, which also features the Dharmacakra
- Flag of Mongolia
- National Anthem of Mongolia
- Coat of arms of the Republic of Buryatia
- Coat of arms of Kalmykia
- Emblem of Tuva
