= Flag of Mongolia =

Mongolia
- Mongolian State Flag
- Use: National flag
- Proportion: 1:2
- Adopted: 10 July 1945; 81 years ago (original version with star); 12 February 1992; 34 years ago (star removed); 8 July 2011; 15 years ago (colours standardised)
- Design: A vertical triband of red, blue, and red, with a Soyombo symbol on the red band at the hoist, with the space above the Soyombo symbol two thirds the height of the space below it.
- Designed by: Dodiin Choidog

The national flag of Mongolia (Note: Mongolian: Монгол улсын төрийн далбаа, romanized: Mongol ulsiin töriin dalbaa, pronounced [ˈmɔɴɢɞ̆ɮ ʊɬˈsiŋ tʰɵˈɾiŋ taɮˈpa]) is a vertical triband with a red stripe at each side and a blue stripe in the middle, with the Mongolian Soyombo symbol centred on the stripe nearest the hoist. The blue stripe represents the eternal blue sky, the red stripes thriving for eternity, and the yellow color symbolize Tibetan Buddhism. The Soyombo symbol is a geometric abstraction that represents fire, sun, moon, earth, water, and a Yin and Yang symbol representing two fish as in Mongol mythology fish never sleep thus symbolizing that the spirit of the Mongol people never sleeps.

The current flag was adopted on 10 July 1945, with the communist star, originally seen above the Soyombo, which was used during the final 47 years of the Mongolian People's Republic, was removed on 12 February 1992 along with the current official colour standards being set on 8 July 2011. This flag was originally designed by artist Dodiin Choidog (Додийн Чойдог).

It has become common practice among Mongolians in the Inner Mongolia autonomous region to hang the Mongolian flag, although the Chinese government is allegedly against public displays of Mongolian national or cultural symbols due to concerns of separatism.

== Colours ==
Colour Scheme	Red	Blue	Yellow
HEX	#c7272f	#025299	#fbd100
CMYK	10/100/90/0	100/60/0/0	0/15/100/0
Source			

== Historical flags ==
Flag	Date	Description
	1911–1919	Following the 1911 Mongolian declaration of independence during the fall of the Chinese Qing dynasty, the Bogd Khanate of Mongolia adopted a national flag as symbol of this independence. The decision to adopt a national flag was also made to follow the international standard at the time in order to promote the image of a modern independent state. A decree established the colours and dimensions of the flag; a yellow oblong rectangle with religious prayer text, in the middle of which was a Soyombo, lotus flower, and the letters "E" and "Bam". From this rectangle flowed red silk tails containing the letters "Om", "Ah", and "Hum". Larger flags were intended for government use while smaller versions were intended for ordinary people. Surviving flags can be seen with minor individual differences of the complex design.
	1920–1921	In late 1919 Chinese troops began occupying Mongolia. On 1 January 1920 a ceremony was held which revoked Mongolian autonomy and reincorporated it into China, raising the five-striped flag of the Republic of China.
	1921–1924	Following the communist Revolution of 1921 Mongolian independence was restored. The country was formally still a monarchy and its flag remained, which had been carried by many of the revolutionary soldiers.
	1924–1940	Following the death of the Bogd Khan in 1924, the Mongolian People's Republic was proclaimed. The new republic's first constitution was adopted on 26 November 1924 and described its new flag. The flag's exact shape and design was not completely standardised and only defined as "the flag is red with the state emblem at the center." It can therefore be seen with some variations, such as without any text or using a rectangular shape without the three tails.
	1940–1945	In November 1939 Mongolian leader Khorloogiin Choibalsan discussed the adoption of a new constitution with the leadership of the Soviet Union while visiting there. On 30 July 1940 the second constitution of the Mongol People's Republic was adopted, and with it, the second flag. After having reviewed a draft of the new state emblem, Joseph Stalin advised that "in order to show that there are many animals, the coat of arms should have a man with a horse in the middle and various animal figures around him". This new emblem, stripped of any remaining religious symbolism, was present on the new flag which was described as "consisting of 1:2 sized red cloth with the state emblem in the center and "Mongol People's Republic" written on either side".
	1945–1992	At the Yalta Conference, towards the end of World War II, it was agreed to preserve the status quo of Mongolia's existence. A new flag with national symbolism was considered necessary for the success of Soviet and Mongolian attempts to convince the Chinese to recognize Mongolian independence. Choibalsan brought up the issue of adopting a new flag at the 43rd meeting of the Presidium of the State Conference on 10 July 1945, where the new flag's design was approved. Choibalsan chose to restore the Soyombo as a national symbol on the flag and described its adoption as a high celebration of Mongolia's independence. The new flag was amended into the constitution in 1949 and was included from the beginning in the constitution adopted in 1960. The flag was used until the adoption of the democratic constitution and a new flag in 1992.
	1992–2011	Older version of Mongolia's current flag, the star had been removed.

== Other flags of Mongolia ==
Flag	Date	Description
	1921*	Reconstruction of the alleged flag of the People's Provisional Government, used during the Mongolian Revolution of 1921. There exists no images or surviving examples of this flag, only alleged descriptions. Therefore, dimensions of the flags shape and the exact position of the symbol is unknown.
	1930–1940	Flag of unclear type used between 1930 and 1940. Some sources list it as the national flag between 1930 and 1940, but no clear adoption date or amendment into the constitution exists and evidence shows the 1924-flag being used until 1940. Possibly a civil or naval ensign of the very small Mongolian Navy, which was established in 1930. It is for example listed among flags and maritime ensigns in a Soviet Red Army atlas from 1938.
	None; 1924–1930 (erroneous)	Erroneous flag of the Mongolian People's Republic, with an unusual blue Soyombo, which appears in several Western sources. This contradicts Mongolian sources, contemporary depictions, and photographic evidence of the real 1924-flag in use at the time.
		Flag of the Mongolian National Olympic Committee
		Flag of the Mongolian Armed Forces
		Flag of the Mongolian Ground Force
		Flag of the Mongolian Air Force

== Administrative divisions ==
Flag of Ulaanbaatar

Flag of Arkhangai Province

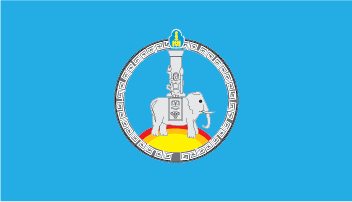
Flag of Bayankhongor Province

Flag of Bayan-Ölgii Province

Flag of Bulgan Province

Flag of Darkhan-Uul Province

Flag of Dornod Province

Flag of Dornogovi Province

Flag of Govi-Altai Province

Flag of Govisümber Province

Flag of Khentii Province

Flag of Khovd Province

Flag of Khövsgöl Province

Flag of Orkhon Province

Flag of Selenge Province

Flag of Sükhbaatar Province

Flag of Töv Province

Flag of Ömnögovi Province

Flag of Uvs Province

Flag of Övörkhangai Province

Flag of Zavkhan Province

== See also ==
- List of Mongolian flags
- Emblem of Mongolia
- National anthem of Mongolia
- Soyombo symbol
- Tug (banner)
- Flag of Laos (similar triband, horizontal pattern instead of vertical one)
