= Soyombo symbol =

National symbol of Mongolia

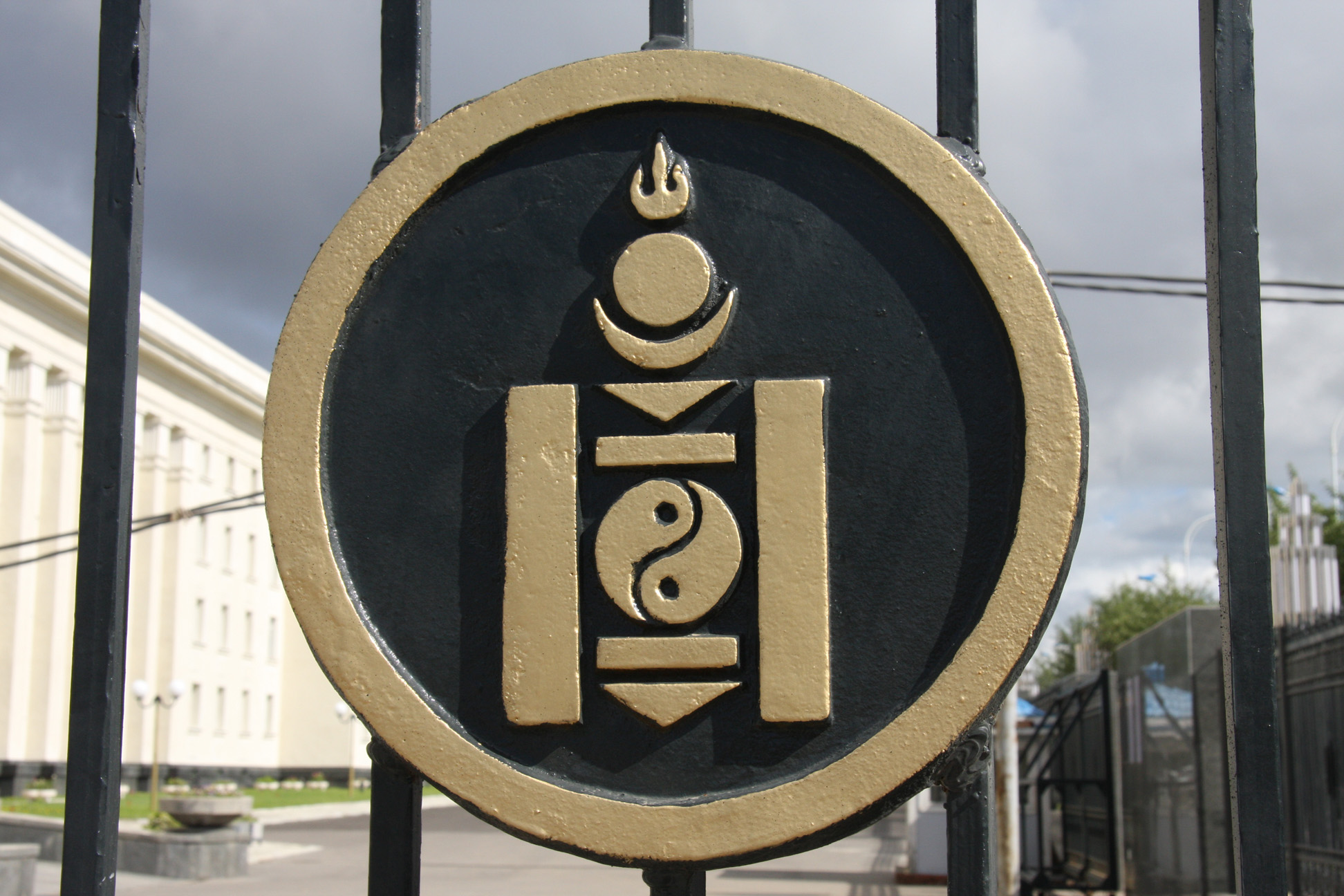
Soyombo symbol on the gate of the Government Palace in Ulaanbaatar

The Soyombo symbol (Note: /ˈsɔɪəmboʊ/ SOY-əm-boh; Khalkha Mongolian: Соёмбо, romanized: Soyombo, pronounced [sɔ́jmpə̆]; Classical Mongolian: ᠰᠣᠶᠤᠮᠪᠤ [ˈsojomb̥ʊ] or ᠰᠣᠶᠣᠩᠪᠣ [ˈsojoɴb̥ʊ]; Sanskrit: स्वयम्भू, romanized: svayambhū, lit. 'self-born') is a special character in the Soyombo script created by the Mongolian Buddhist monk Zanabazar in 1686. The name "Soyombo" is derived from Sanskrit svayambhu 'self-born'. The Soyombo symbol serves both as a traditional symbol of Mongolia, Buryatia and Kalmykia, and as a national symbol of Mongolia, to be found on the flag and emblem of Mongolia, as well as on many other official documents.

In the Soyombo alphabet, the Soyombo symbol (in its various variations) is used to mark the start of a text. There are also terminal markers with a somewhat similar composition, like U+11AA2 𑪢 SOYOMBO TERMINAL MARK-2. It is thought to be possible that the Soyombo symbol may predate the script.

== Symbolism ==
The Soyombo has ten elements in the columnar arrangement of abstract and geometric symbols and patterns. They are fire, sun, crescent moon, two triangles, two horizontal rectangles, the Tamga, and two vertical rectangles. The elements in the symbol are given the following significance (from top):

- Fire is a general symbol of eternal growth, wealth, and success. The three tongues of the flame represent the past, present, and future.
- Sun (●) and crescent moon symbolizes the existence of the Mongolian nation for eternity as the eternal blue sky. Mongolian symbol of the sun, crescent moon and fire derived from the Xiongnu.
- The two triangles (▼) allude to the point of an arrow or spear. They point downward to announce the defeat of interior and exterior enemies.
- The two horizontal rectangles (▬) give stability to the round shape. The rectangular shape represents the honesty and justice of the people of Mongolia, whether they stand at the top or at the bottom of society.
- The degree tamga with dots (☯) illustrates the mutual complement of opposites and it is interpreted as two fish, of symbolizing vigilance because fish never close their eyes.

Tamga of Ögedei Khan, an example of a degree tamga

- The two vertical rectangles (▮) can be interpreted as the walls of a fort. They represent unity and strength, relating to a Mongolian proverb: "The friendship of two is stronger than stone walls."

== Uses ==
Two variants of the Soyombo symbol

The Soyombo symbol has appeared on the national flag of Mongolia since its independence in 1911 (except between 1940 and 1945). It served as the Emblem of Mongolia from 1911 to 1940, and was included in the design again in 1960. Mongolian Armed Forces vehicles bear the symbol as a marking.

The symbol is seen all over the country, especially on a hillside outside of Ulaanbaatar.

The flag and coat of arms of Buryatia as well as the flag of Agin-Buryat Okrug in Russia, and that of the Inner Mongolian People's Party display the top elements (Flame, Sun, and Moon).

== Unicode ==
The Soyombo symbol is available in Unicode, where it is encoded in the Soyombo block (added to Unicode version 10.0 in June 2017) as a script-specific punctuation mark:

- U+11A9E 𑪞 SOYOMBO HEAD MARK WITH MOON AND SUN AND TRIPLE FLAME, with two reduced alternatives:
- U+11A9F 𑪟 SOYOMBO HEAD MARK WITH MOON AND SUN AND FLAME (keeping only the right tongue of the top flame) and
- U+11AA0 𑪠 SOYOMBO HEAD MARK WITH MOON AND SUN (with the top flame removed).

These three head marks are usable along with two other related terminal marks (keeping only the two lateral vertical rectangles and replacing the central symbols):

- U+11AA1 𑪡 SOYOMBO TERMINAL MARK-1, and
- U+11AA2 𑪢 SOYOMBO TERMINAL MARK-2.

== Flags incorporating Soyombo variants ==
Flag of Mongolia

Flag of the Republic of Buryatia

Flag of Agin-Buryat Okrug

Flag of the People's Party

Flag of the Democratic Party

Flag of the Inner Mongolian People's Party

Flag of the Mongolian National Olympic Committee

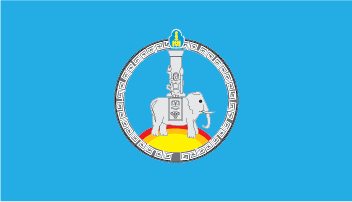
Flag of Bayankhongor Province

Flag of Govi-Altai Province

Flag of Övörkhangai Province

Flag of Uvs Province

Flag of Ulaanbaatar

== See also ==
- Coat of arms of Buryatia
- Coat of arms of Mongolia
- National anthem of Mongolia
