= Economy of Mongolia =

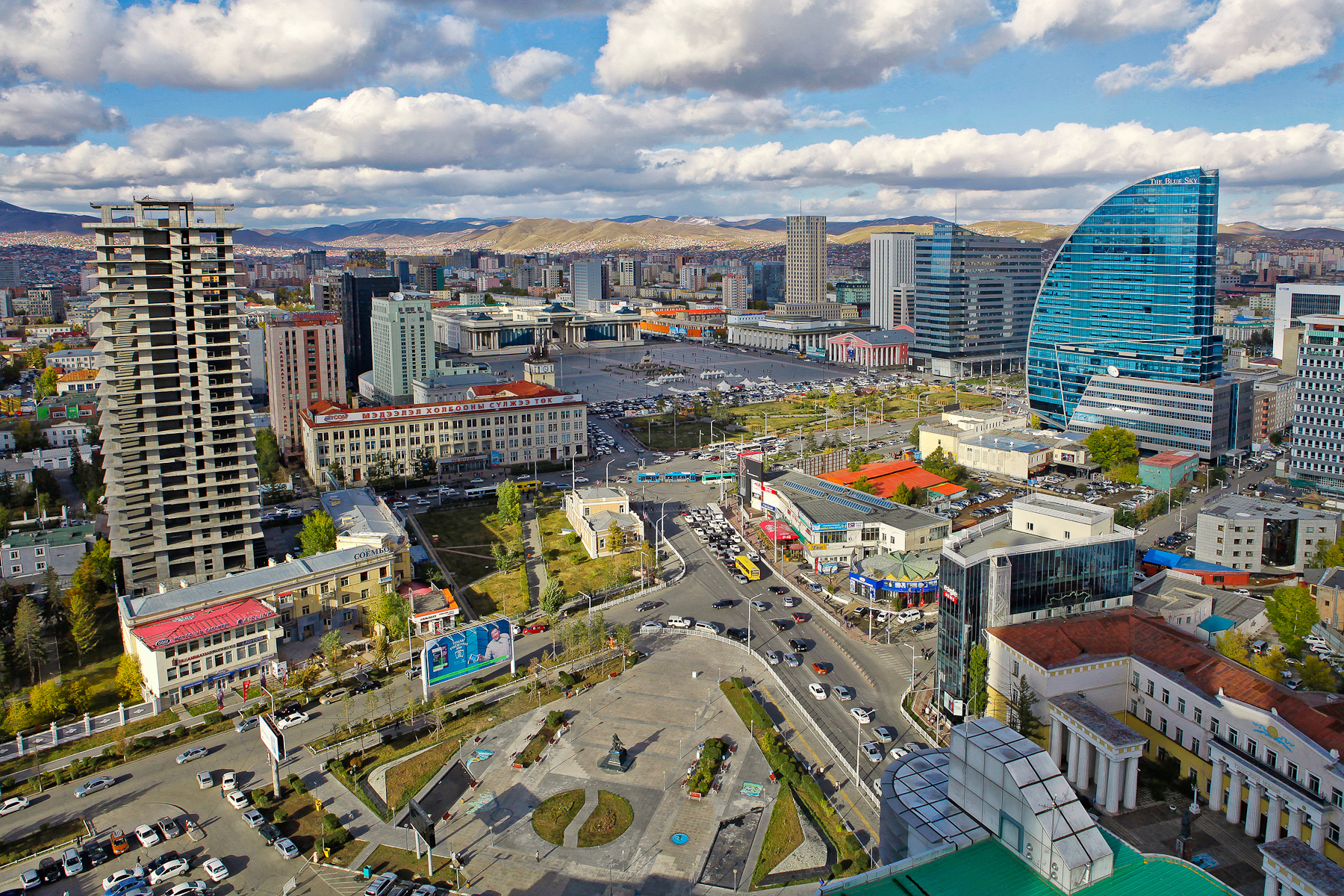
- View of Ulaanbaatar, the economic center of Mongolia
- Currency: Mongolian tögrög (MNT, ₮)
- Fiscal year: Calendar year
- Trade organizations: WTO, IMF, World Bank, ADB, SCO (Observer)
- Country group: Developing/Emerging; Upper-middle income economy

Statistics
- Population: ▲3,568,978 (2025)
- GDP: ▲$28.45 billion (nominal; 2026); ▲$80.39 billion (PPP; 2026)
- GDP rank: 119th (nominal; 2026); 115th (PPP; 2026)
- GDP growth: ▲6.8% (2025); ▲5.5% (2026f); ▲5.5% (2027f)
- GDP per capita: ▲$7,853 (nominal; 2026); ▲$22,192 (PPP; 2026)
- GDP per capita rank: 100th (nominal; 2026); 91st (PPP; 2026)
- GDP per capita growth: 5.5% (real; 2025)
- GDP by sector: agriculture: 12.1%; industry: 38.2%; services: 49.7%; (2017 est.)
- Inflation (CPI): 10.3% (2023); 6.5% (2024); 9.0% (2025)
- Population below national poverty line: 27.1% (2022); 2% on less than $3.20 (2022)
- Gini coefficient: 31.4 medium (2022)
- Human Development Index: ▲0.747 high (2023) (104th); ▲0.647 medium IHDI (2023, 72nd)
- Labor force by occupation: agriculture: 31.1%; industry: 18.5%; services: 50.5%; (2016)
- Unemployment: ▼5.4% (2025); ▼9.9% (Q3, 2019); ▼10.5% youth unemployment (2025)
- Main industries: construction and construction materials, mining (coal, copper, molybdenum, fluorspar, tin, tungsten, and gold), oil, food and beverages, processing of animal products, cashmere wool and natural fiber manufacturing

External
- Exports: ▼$15.8 billion (2025)
- Export goods: copper, apparel, livestock, animal products, cashmere, wool, hides, fluorspar, other nonferrous metals, coal, crude oil
- Main export partners: China 86.0%; Switzerland 9.27%; South Korea 1%; EU 0.99%; Italy 0.54%; EAEU 0.89%; Russia 0.69%; Others 1.85% (2023)
- Imports: ▼$11.3 billion (2025)
- Import goods: machinery and equipment, fuel, cars, food products, industrial consumer goods, chemicals, building materials, cigarettes and tobacco, appliances, soap and detergent
- Main import partners: China 38.7%; EAEU 26.5%; Russia 24.9%; Kazakhstan 1.31%; EU 9.36%; Germany 2.19%; Poland 1.11%; Japan 7.89%; South Korea 4.71%; United States 3.01%; Vietnam 1.20%; Turkey 1.07% (2023)
- FDI stock: ▲$18.02 billion (2017 est.); ▲ Abroad: $495 million (31 December 2017 est.)
- Current account: ▲ −$2.12 billion (2025)
- Gross external debt: ▲$41.3 billion (2025)

Public finance
- Government debt: ▼39.4% of GDP (2025)
- Foreign reserves: ▲$7.00 billion (2025)
- Budget balance: −6.4% (of GDP) (2017 est.)
- Revenue: 2.967 billion (2017 est.)
- Spending: 3.681 billion (2017 est.)
- Economic aid: $260.2 million (net ODA received, 2023)
- Credit rating: Standard & Poor's: BB- (Domestic); BB- (Foreign); BB (T&C Assessment); Outlook: Stable; Moody's: B1; Outlook: Stable; Fitch: B+ Outlook: Stable
- All values, unless otherwise stated, are in US dollars.

The economy of Mongolia has historically been based on herding and agriculture, but mining has become the dominant sector of the economy. Mongolia possesses major deposits of copper, coal, gold, molybdenum, and other minerals, which account for much of the country’s industrial output and exports.

Following the collapse of the Soviet Union in 1990–91 and the end of Soviet aid, Mongolia entered a severe recession during its transition from a planned economy to market economy. Economic growth resumed in the late 1990s despite setbacks from natural disasters and the 1997 Asian financial crisis. Mongolia joined the World Trade Organization in 1997.

From the 2000s onward, rapid expansion of the mining sector drove strong economic growth. However, the economy remains highly dependent on commodity exports and demand from China, making it vulnerable to fluctuations in global mining markets.

== History ==
Historical development of real GDP per capita in Mongolia

=== Before the 20th century ===
Mongolia's economy and civilization was historically built around nomadic pastoralism, a form of subsistence agriculture, mainly due to the region's extreme climate unsuited for early settled civilizations. With the introduction of Buddhism, wealth became gradually concentrated to feudal nobles and the Buddhist clergy which formed the top class of Mongolian society. During the Qing occupation of Mongolia from 1635 to 1911, banking, services, and trading were dominated by the Chinese and other foreigners.

=== 1921–1990: Socialist era ===
Following the People's Revolution of 1921, Mongolian revolutionaries inherited an underdeveloped, stagnant economy based on animal husbandry. Farming and industry were almost nonexistent; transportation and communications remained primitive. With a high illiteracy rate, the country's large part of the male labour force lived in the monasteries, contributing little to the economy. Property in the form of livestock was owned primarily by aristocrats and monasteries while remaining economics sectors were owned by foreigners. In 1924, the main economic policy of the Mongolian People's Republic was stated to be a non-capitalist way of development by the ruling party. The theory, formulated by Vladimir Lenin in 1920, outlined the socialist modernization and industrialization for pre-capitalist societies by skipping the capitalist stage entirely.

With the emergence of hardline leftist leaders in 1928, waves of Soviet-inspired anti-religious campaigns, collectivization, nationalization, and confiscation of estates were implemented between 1928 and 1932. The state policies and campaign coincided with similar campaigns by Joseph Stalin. However, the forced policies led to a severe economic breakdown and a widespread unrest and armed uprisings in 1932. Consequently, the state withdrew its aggressive socialist policies, as advised by the Comintern, instead adopting the Шинэ эргэлтийн бодлого (Shine ergeltiin boglogo, lit. "New Turn Policy"). The New Turn liberalized economic development in favour of a slow gradualist approach to achieve socialism. However, the policy was considered effectively a temporary retreat by Khorloogiin Choibalsan and Soviet authorities.

Industry accounted for 7 percent of Mongolia’s Net Material Product (NMP) in 1950, but for 35 percent of the total by 1985, and trade increased from 10 percent in 1950 to 26 percent by 1985. Agriculture, including herding, which accounted for 68 percent of NMP in 1950, had declined to 20 percent by 1985. In 1960, 61 percent of the employed worked in the agricultural sector, but by 1985 only 33 percent earned their livelihoods in that sector. GDP figures for Mongolia record growth throughout the 1980s. As late as 1988, the annual increase in GDP amounted to 5.1 percent.

The Soviet Union served as the primary market for Mongolian industry. With Soviet and Council for Mutual Economic Assistance (CMEA) aid, Mongolia's industrial sector became increasingly important during the late 1960s and 1970s. During the period, the industrial cities of Erdenet and Darkhan were founded alongside significant advances in economic modernization, industrialization and urban growth. By 1989, industrial output accounted for an estimated 34% of material products, compared to 18% from agriculture. However, minerals, animals, and animal-derived products still constituted a large proportion of the country's exports. Principal imports included machinery, petroleum, cloth, and building materials.

In the late 1980s, the government began to improve links with non-communist Asia and the West, and tourism in Mongolia developed. As of 1 January 1991, Mongolia and the former Soviet Union agreed to conduct bilateral trade in hard currency at world prices.

The rapid political changes of 1990–91 marked the beginning of Mongolia's efforts to develop a market economy, but these efforts were complicated and disrupted by the dissolution and continuing deterioration of the economy of the former Soviet Union. Prior to 1991, 80% of Mongolia's trade was with the Soviet Union, and 15% was with other CMEA countries. Mongolia was heavily dependent upon the former Soviet Union for fuel, medicine, and spare parts for its factories and power plants.

=== 1990–2008: Transition ===
Despite its external difficulties, Mongolia continued to press ahead with reform in 1991. Privatization of small shops and enterprises has largely been completed in the 1990s, and most prices have been freed. Alongwith tax reforms, privatization of large state enterprises began in 1991, which continued onwards until the early 2000s. The barter and official exchange rates were unified in late 1991.

Between 1990 and 1993, Mongolia suffered triple-digit inflation, rising unemployment, shortages of basic goods, and food rationing. During that period, economic output contracted by one-third. As market reforms and private enterprise took hold, economic growth began again in 1994–95. Unfortunately, since this growth was fueled in part by over-allocation of bank credit, especially to the remaining state-owned enterprises, economic growth was accompanied by a severe weakening of the banking sector. GDP grew by about 6% in 1995, thanks to largely to a boom in copper prices. Average real economic growth leveled off to about 3.5% in 1996–99 due to the 1997 Asian financial crisis, the 1998 Russian financial crisis, and worsening commodity prices, especially copper and gold.

Mongolia's gross domestic product (GDP) growth fell from 3.2% in 1999 to 1.3% in 2000. The decline can be attributed to the loss of 2.4 million livestock due to consecutive years of extreme winter conditions, known as dzud, in 2000. Prospects for development outside the traditional reliance on nomadic, livestock-based agriculture are constrained by Mongolia's landlocked location and lack of basic infrastructure. Since 1990, more than 1,500 foreign companies from 61 countries have invested a total of $338.3 million in Mongolia. By 2003 private companies made up 70% of Mongolian GDP and 80% of exports.

Until recently, there have been a very few restrictions on foreign investments during most of Mongolia's post-socialist period. Consequently, mining industry's contribution to FDI increased to almost 25% in 1999 from zero in 1990.

=== Development since 2008 ===
Historical and predicted annual GDP growth in Mongolia

Mongolia’s economy was heavily affected by the 2008 financial crisis because of its dependence on commodity exports and trade with China. The sharp fall in global metal prices, particularly copper prices, severely reduced export revenues and slowed economic growth. By 2009, the Mongolian Stock Exchange TOP-20 index had fallen to a historic low following a speculative boom in 2007. The economy was further hit by the 2009–2010 dzud, which caused widespread livestock deaths and damaged Mongolia’s important cashmere sector. According to estimates from the World Bank and the International Monetary Fund, real GDP growth fell from 8% in 2008 to 2.7% in 2009, while exports shrank from US$2.5 billion to US$1.9 billion after several years of rapid expansion before the crisis.

The country subsequently experienced a mining-driven economic boom tied to major projects such as Oyu Tolgoi. During this period, investment banks and financial analysts promoted Mongolia as a high-growth frontier market. The term "Wolf Economy" or "Asian Wolf" was popularised by Renaissance Capital in a 2009 report that predicted Mongolia could become a new Asian tiger economy due to its mineral wealth and rapid projected growth.

Investor optimism weakened significantly after 2012 amid growing concerns over resource nationalism and foreign investment policy. A proposed acquisition of coal miner SouthGobi Resources by the Chinese state-owned company Chalco was blocked by the Mongolian government in 2012. In response to the controversy, Mongolia passed the Strategic Entities Foreign Investment Law, which imposed stricter review requirements on foreign investments in sectors deemed strategic. Although the law was later repealed and replaced, it damaged investor confidence and contributed to a broader economic slowdown during the 2010s. The decline in investor sentiment coincided with a sharp reversal in mining valuations. By 2015, SouthGobi Resources had lost approximately 98% of the market value it had reached during the peak of the mining boom in 2012.

Mongolia’s economy slowed again in the early 2020s during COVID-19 pandemic and supply-chain disruptions linked to the Russian invasion of Ukraine. Economic growth in 2022 was projected at around 1%, though international institutions anticipated a rebound in 2023 driven by increased commodity exports. A new commodity export boom was expected following the opening of additional rail connections to China and the expansion of underground copper production at Oyu Tolgoi. Despite renewed growth, Mongolia continued to face structural economic challenges in the 2020s, including heavy dependence on mining exports, inflation, rising debt levels, and vulnerability to external shocks such as disruptions to Russian fuel supplies.

In November 2025, Mongolia’s parliament approved the 2026 state budget, projecting revenue of ₮31.93 trillion and expenditure of ₮32.98 trillion, resulting in a deficit of approximately 1% of GDP. According to Mongolia Weekly, the budget included measures to curb non-essential spending, adjust public-sector wages in line with inflation, and prioritise ongoing investment projects.

== Sectors ==
=== Agriculture ===
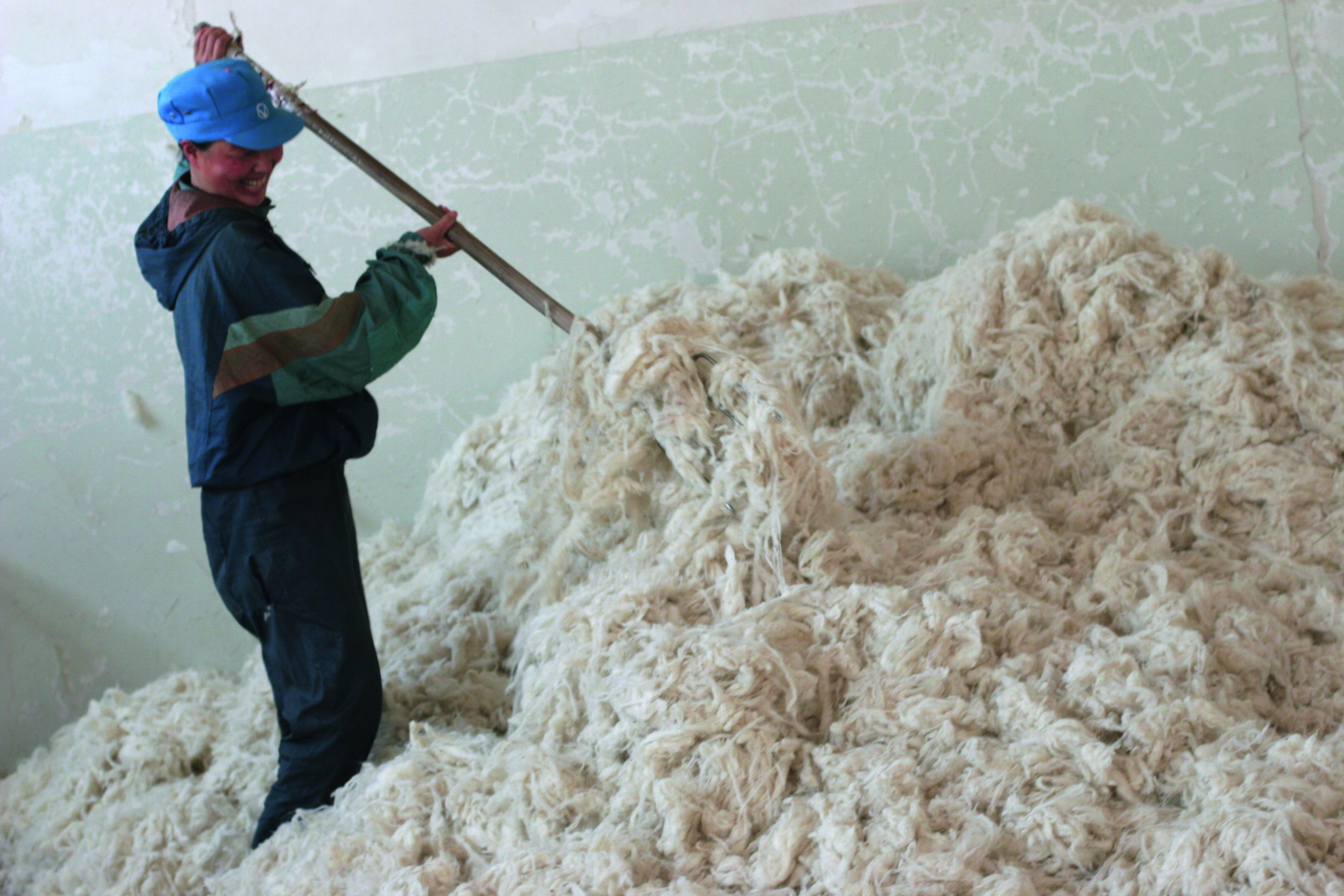
Mongolian factory worker with cashmere

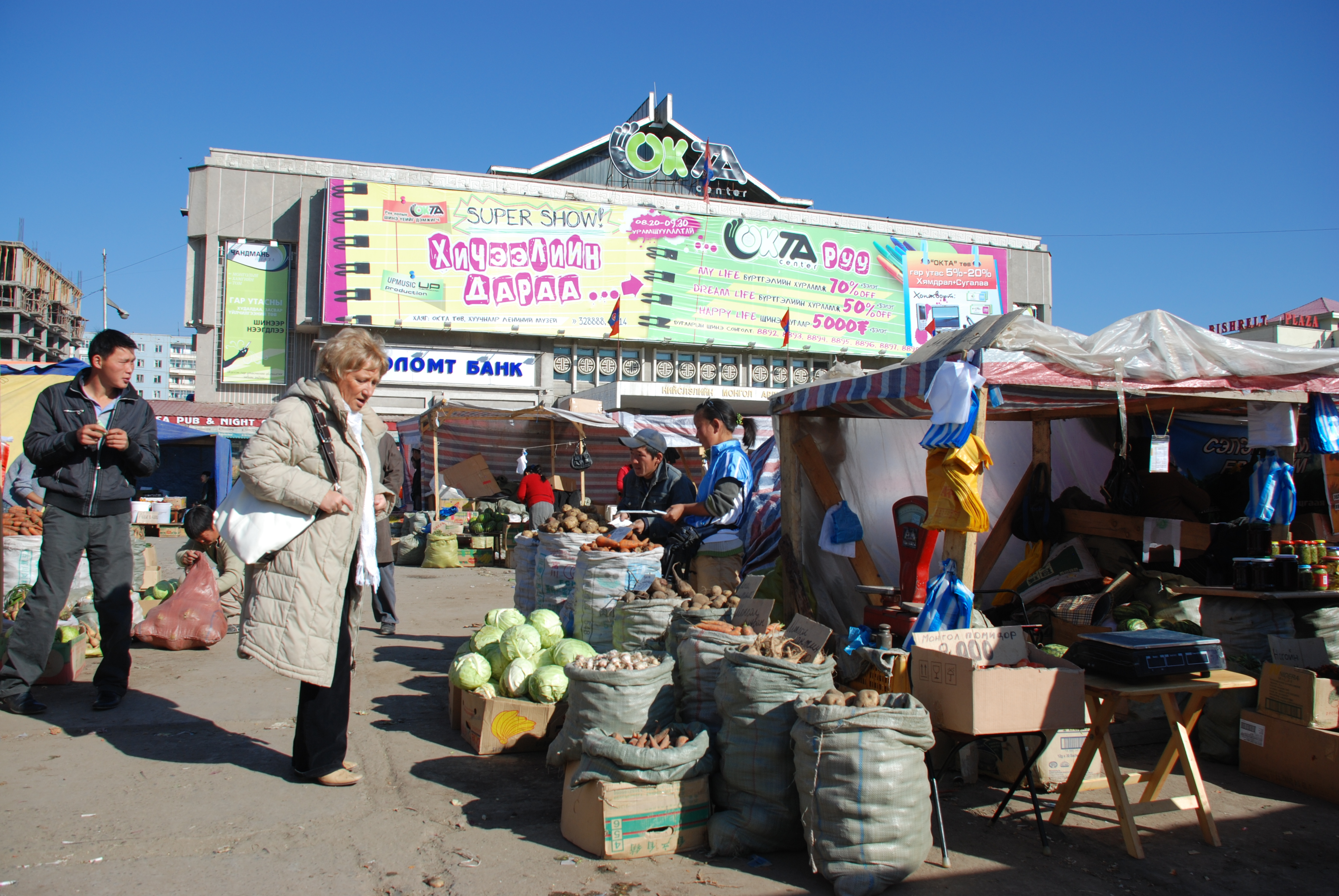
Farmers' market in Ulaanbaatar

Agriculture in Mongolia constitutes over 10% of Mongolia's annual gross domestic product and employs one-third of the labor force. However, the high altitude, extreme fluctuation in temperature, long winters, and low precipitation provides limited potential for agricultural development. The growing season is only 95 – 110 days. Because of Mongolia's harsh climate, it is unsuited to most cultivation.

The agriculture sector therefore remains heavily focused on nomadic animal husbandry with 75% of the land allocated to pasture, and cropping only employing 3% of the population. About 35% of all households in Mongolia lived from breeding livestock. Most herders in Mongolia follow a pattern of nomadic or semi-nomadic pastoralism.

Crops produced in Mongolia include wheat, barley, and potatoes. Animals raised commercially in the country include sheep, goats, cattles, horses, camels, and pigs. They are raised primarily for their meat, although goats are valued for their hair which can be used to produce cashmere. Livestock breeds are increasingly challenged by land degradation and climate change. Populations suffer from more frequent and intense extreme weather events, especially brutal winter seasons called zuds that destroy forage and can decrease temperatures to around −50 °C. While zuds used to occur about once every ten years, there have now been six in the past decade, with over six million animals (9% of total livestock) killed by these conditions in the winter of 2024.

=== Tourism ===
Altai Tavan Bogd massif, the highest mountain range in Mongolia, located in the westernmost province of Bayan-Ölgii

Tourism in Mongolia is a relatively small component of the modern economy of Mongolia. Prior to the COVID-19 pandemic, tourism was reported by the World Bank to be the third-largest economic sector after mining and agriculture, accounting 7.2% of the total GDP in 2019. Since the lockdowns in 2021, visitors to Mongolia have steadily increased, surpassing pre-pandemic levels in 2023.

Travel organizations in Mongolia date back to half a century ago, but the private sector-based tourism is barely twenty years old. Now, Mongolia boasts 403 travel companies, 320 hotels, 647 resorts and tourist camps, all employing the graduates from over 56 educational establishments. As member of the United Nations World Tourism Organization, Mongolia takes an active part in implementing sustainable tourism.

As one of the least densely populated countries in the world, much of Mongolia's tourism is based on its landscapes and nomadic culture. 8.6% of the total landmass (134,964.02 km^{2}) are protected as national parks, which include parts of the Mongolian–Manchurian grassland, the Gobi Desert, and extensive mountain, river, and lake systems. Although backpacking is becoming more common, travel outside the capital and largest city, Ulaanbaatar, is mostly arranged by tour operator companies due to limited infrastructure and local labour. With domestic and international travel peaking in July and August, most visitors travel in summer, when the weather is the warmest.

=== Mining ===
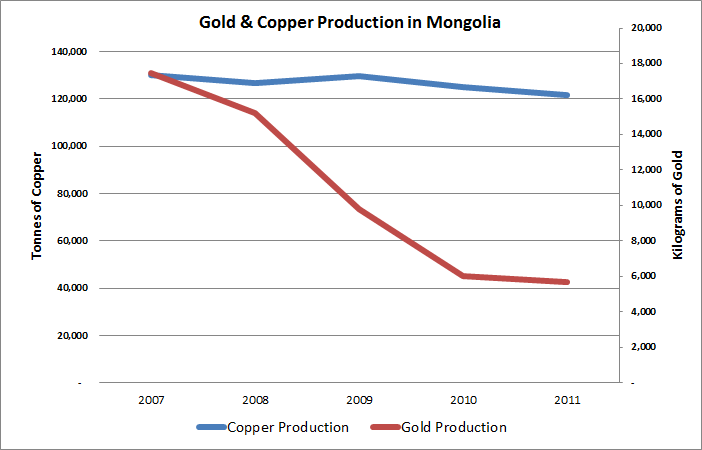
Mongolia's copper and gold production rates from 2007 through 2011

Mining is important to the national economy of Mongolia. Mongolia is one of the 29 resource-rich developing countries identified by the International Monetary Fund and exploration of copper and coal deposits are generating substantial additional revenue.

As of 2023, only 45% of Mongolian territory had been mapped geologically at a 150,000 scale. As of June 2021, active mineral licenses cover nearly 4% of the territory.

Coal, copper, and gold are the principal reserves mined in Mongolia. Several gold mines are located about 110 kilometres (68 mi) north of Ulaanbaatar, such as Boroo Gold Mine and Gatsuurt Gold Mine. Khotgor Coal Mine is an open-pit coal mining site about 120 kilometres (75 mi) west of Ulaangom. Ömnögovi Province, in the south of Mongolia, is home to large scale mining projects such as the Tavan Tolgoi coal mine and the Oyu Tolgoi copper mine. Oyu Tolgoi mine is reported to have the potential to boost the national economy by a third but is subject to dispute over how the profits should be shared. The International Monetary Fund (IMF) has estimated that 71 percent of the income from the mine would go to Mongolia.

Mongolia Energy Corporation, a mining and energy company operating in Mongolia and Xinjiang and Erdenet Mining Corporation, a joint Mongolian-Russian venture, account for a large percentage of the mining in the country, but Anglo-Australian companies such as Rio Tinto and Canadian companies such as Turquoise Hill Resources are active in the country and have agreements with the government. The government institution responsible for overseeing mining development in the country is the Mineral Resources and Petroleum Authority (MRPAM).

In 2024, the Mongolian Parliament enacted legislation to establish a sovereign wealth fund, known as the "Chinggis Fund," aimed at reallocating revenues from the country's mineral resources to benefit all citizens. This initiative seeks to address social inequality by channeling profits from "strategic" mines into long-term investments in health, education, and housing.

=== Banks ===
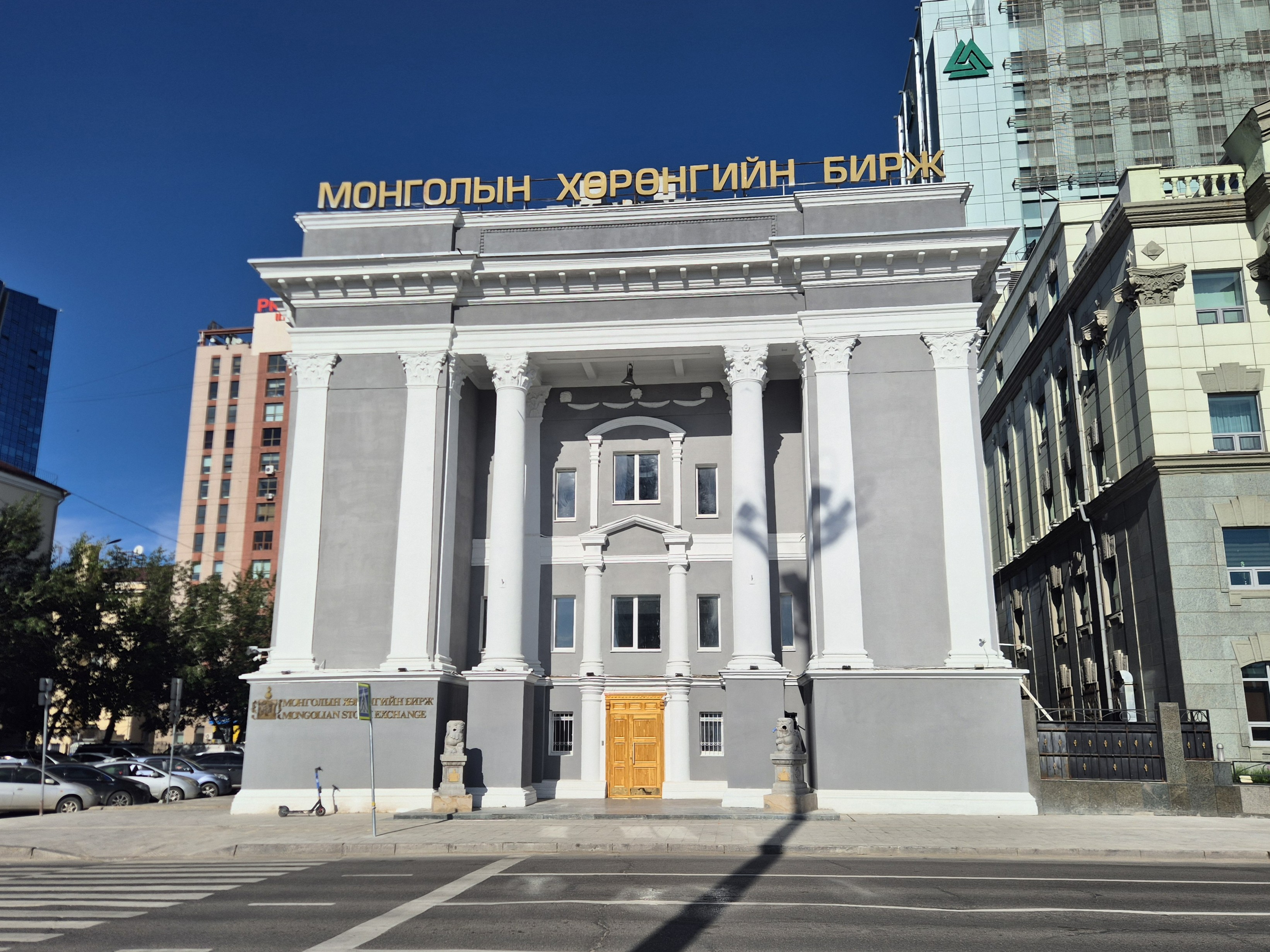
Headquarters of the Mongolian Stock Exchange, established in 1991

The banking sector is highly concentrated, with five banks controlling about 80% of financial assets as of 2015: Shares of Mongolia's five largest domestic banks are to be offered to the public for the first time on the soon-to-be partially privatized Mongolian Stock Exchange.

==== Commercial banks ====
- KhasBank - KhasBank is a community development bank and microfinance institution headquartered in Ulaanbaatar, with a nationwide network of 100 offices and 1309 staff as of June 2012.
- Khan Bank - Khan Bank has its central office in Ulaanbaatar, where 5 branches are located. It has 24 regional branch offices throughout the country, each of which supervises an additional 15 to 25 smaller branches in its area, totaling 512.
- Golomt Bank - Golomt Bank started in 1995 and now manages around 23% of the assets in the domestic banking system. Recently begun its stock sales.
- Trade and Development Bank - TDB was formed in 1990 and is thus the oldest bank in Mongolia. It has a network of 28 branches and settlement centers, 60 ATMs, 1300 POS terminals, and Internet/SMS banking throughout the country. Foreign banks like ING are breaking into the market.
- Other lesser banks are: M-Bank, State bank, Capitron Bank, Arig Bank, Bogd Bank, and Chinggis Bank.

In terms of access to credit, Mongolia ranked 61st out of 189 economies in accordance with 2015 Ease of Doing Business survey. However, Mongolia had one of the highest banking branch penetration rates in the world at 1 bank branch per 15,257 residents as of May 2015.

==== Investment banks ====
With a strengthening capital market environment, many foreign and local investment institutions have begun to establish themselves in Mongolia. The most prominent local agencies include: TDB Capital, Eurasia Capital, Monet Investment Bank, BDSec, MICC, and Frontier Securities.

== Infrastructure ==
=== Energy ===
Mongolia had a total primary energy supply (TPES) of 6.66 Mtoe in 2019. Electricity consumption was 7.71 TWh. Mongolia is a big producer of coal, which is mostly exported. Domestic consumption of coal accounts for about 70% of Mongolia's primary energy and makes up most of the electricity generation, accounting for about 87% of the domestic electricity production in 2019.

=== Transport ===
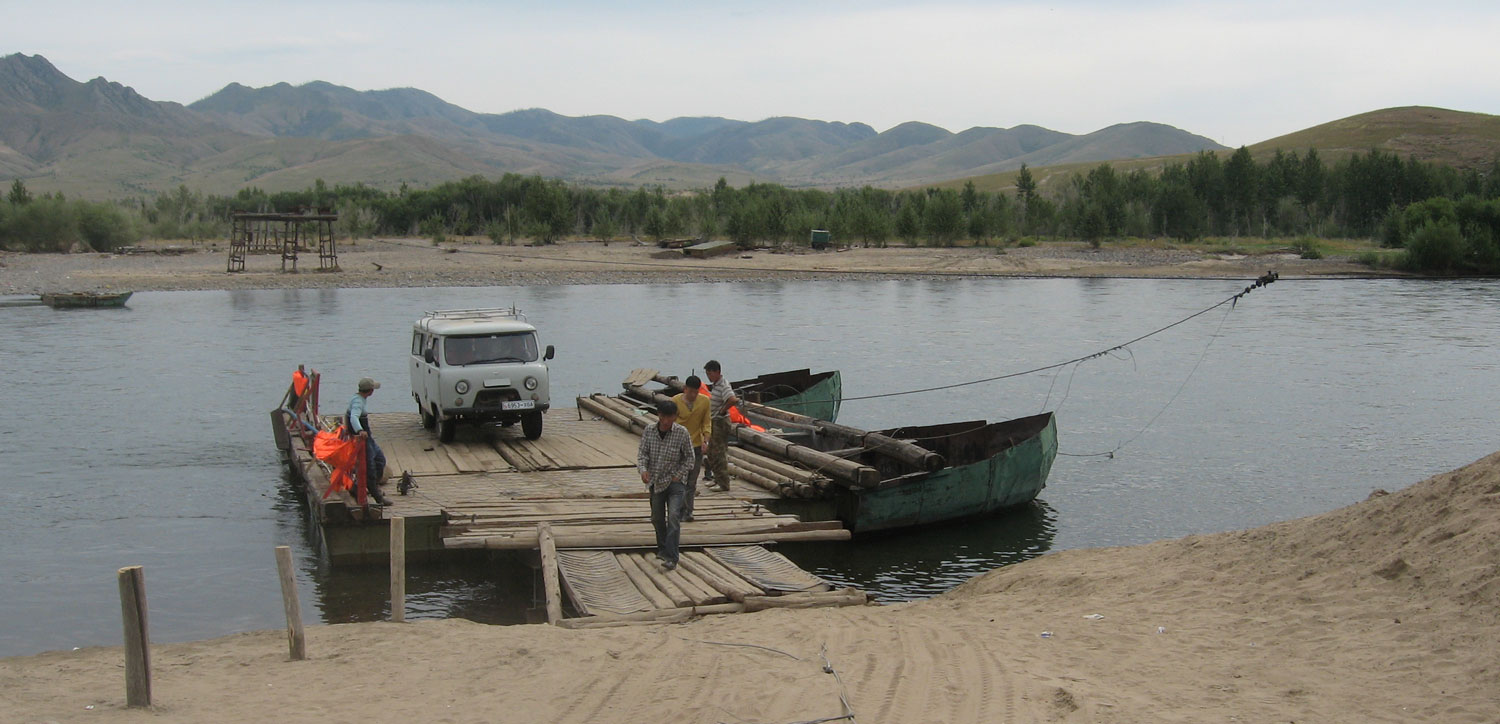
Cable ferry across the Selenge river, in Khövsgöl aimag

Transportation in Mongolia comprises rail, road, air, and limited water transport systems that support movement across the country's vast and sparsely populated territory. Railways form the backbone of freight transport, while roads and buses provide domestic and urban connectivity. Air transport plays a key role in linking remote regions, and inland waterways are used only to a limited extent.

=== Telecommunications ===
Telecommunications in Mongolia face unique challenges. As the least densely populated country in the world, with a significant portion of the population living a nomadic lifestyle, it has been difficult for many traditional information and communication technology (ICT) companies to make headway into Mongolian society. With almost half the population clustered in the capital of Ulaanbaatar, most landline technologies are deployed there. Wireless technologies have had greater success in rural areas.

Mobile phones are common, with provincial capitals all having 4G access. Wireless local loop is another technology that has helped Mongolia increase accessibility to telecommunications and bypass fixed-line infrastructure. For Internet, Mongolia relies on fiber optic communications with its Chinese and Russian neighbors. In 2005, Mongolia's state-run radio and TV provider converted to a public service provider. Private radio and TV broadcasters, multi-channel satellite, and cable TV providers are also available.

== Environment ==
As a result of rapid urbanization and industrial growth policies under the communist regime, Mongolia's deteriorating environment has become a major concern. The burning of soft coal coupled with thousands of factories in Ulaanbaatar and a sharp increase in individual motorization has resulted in severe air pollution. Deforestation, overgrazed pastures, and, less recently, efforts to increase grain and hay production by plowing up more virgin land have increased soil erosion from wind and rain.

== Macroeconomic statistics ==
Exports of Mongolia by product category (2019) Chemical products Transportation Machines Mineral products Plastics and rubbers Metals Foodstuffs Precious metals Textiles Instruments Animal products Vegetable products Paper goods Footwear and headwear Miscellaneous Stone and glass Wood products Animal and vegetable bi-products Animal hides Arts and antiques Weapons

The following table shows the main economic indicators in 1980–2026. Inflation below 5% is in green.

Year	GDP (in bil. US$ PPP)	GDP per capita (in US$ PPP)	GDP (in bil. US$ nominal)	Real GDP growth (%)	Inflation (%)	Government debt (% of GDP)
1980	2.6	n/a	2.7	▲6.4	▲n/a	n/a
1985	▲4.6	n/a	▲3.3	▲5.7	▲n/a	n/a
1990	▲6.5	▲3140	▼2.7	▼ -2.5	▲n/a	n/a
1995	▼6.4	▼2847	▼1.5	▲6.4	▲0.2	n/a
2000	▲7.9	▲3304	▼1.1	▲1.1	▲11.3	n/a
2005	▲12.3	▲4810	▲2.5	▲6.5	▲12.6	n/a
2006	▲13.7	▲5296	▲3.4	▲8.2	▲4.4	▲40.9
2007	▲15.3	▲5832	▲4.2	▲8.8	▲9.6	▼36.1
2008	▲16.8	▲6300	▲5.6	▲7.8	▲28	▼31
2009	▼16.5	▼6093	▼4.6	▼ -2.1	▲7.6	▲48.5
2010	▲18.0	▲6510	▲7.2	▲7.3	▲8.3	▼31
2011	▲21.5	▲7653	▲10.4	▲17.3	▲8.8	▲32.7
2012	▲24.6	▲8585	▲12.3	▲12.3	▲13.8	▲43.7
2013	▲28.0	▲9540	▲12.6	▲11.6	▲10.6	▲49.4
2014	▲30.7	▲10242	▼12.2	▲7.9	▲12.9	▼44
2015	▲31.7	▲10372	▼11.6	▲2.4	▲6.8	▲50.5
2016	▲32.5	▲10415	▼11.2	▲1.5	▲0.8	▲78.7
2017	▲34.9	▲10995	▲11.5	▲5.6	▲4.3	▲86.9
2018	▲39.5	▲12202	▲13.2	▲7.7	▲6.8	▼76.5
2019	▲44.5	▲13485	▲14.2	▲5.6	▲7.3	▼66.8
2020	▲45.6	▲13569	▼13.3	▼ -4.6	▲3.7	▲83.4
2021	▲50.1	▲14679	▲15.3	▲1.6	▲7.4	▼67.3
2022	▲56.3	▲16286	▲17.1	▲5.0	▲15.1	▼64.5
2023	▲62.7	▲17898	▲20.3	▲7.4	▲10.4	▼46.7
2024	▲67.6	▲19064	▲23.8	▲5.1	▲6.2	▼44.1
2025	▲74.3	▲20720	▲25.4	▲6.8	▲8.6	▲45.1
2026	▲80.4	▲22192	▲28.5	▲5.3	▲7.4	▼43.7

== See also ==
- List of companies of Mongolia
- Mongolia and the International Monetary Fund
- Mongolia and the World Bank
- List of Mongolian provinces by GDP
- List of regions of Mongolia by Human Development Index
- Corruption in Mongolia
- Poverty in Mongolia
