= List of companies listed on the Mongolian Stock Exchange =

This is a sortable list of companies listed on the Mongolian Stock Exchange, including their English and Mongolian names, stock codes, and industries, as reflected on the exchange's official website. The list does not currently include information about companies which were delisted prior to 12 September 2007.

The Mongolian Stock Exchange, based in Ulaanbaatar, Mongolia, is the world's smallest stock exchange by market capitalisation. Its listed companies market capitalization was around US$1 billion in 2010 for 336 listed companies. Number of companies is continuing to decline. It is viewed that due to inadequate policy pursued by the Securities Commission being public become an additional burden for many of the public companies which led to mass delisting during the last decade. As of the end of 2014 some 237 companies are listed at the Mongolian Stock Exchange (MSE).

On the other hand, one of the key constraints for developing adequate stock market in Mongolia is lack of individuals’ savings from one side. Weak regulatory and legal environment seems like discouraging potential investors to invest into financial instruments currently being offered on the market.

== List ==
English name	Mongolian name	Stock code	Industry	Date of registration	Source	Homepage
APU	АПУ	APU	alcohol, beverages	1992-02-13		
Bayangol ZB		BNG	hotel	1995-01-19		
BDSec		BDS	brokerage, underwriting, investment advisory and research www.bdsec.mn	1991-01-01		
Gobi		GOV	cashmere products	1994-11-30		
Zoos Goyol		ZOO	jewelry	1993-04-01		
Makhimpecs		MMX	meat products	1993-06-04		
Materialimpecs		MIE	supply	1992-10-20		
Mongol Securities		MSC	stock service			
Mongoliin Tsakhilgaan Kholboo		MCH	telecommunication service	1992-06-08		
NIK		NIC	trade			
Ord Kharsh		OHR	construction			
Spirit Bal Buram		SBB	alcohol, foodstuffs	1994-11-22		
Sonsgolon Barmat		SSG	construction materials	1994-02-07		
Talkh Chikher		TCK	bakery	1994-11-30		
Khailaast		HST	gold mining	1992-05-28		
Ulaanbaatar ZB		ULN	hotel	1995-03-22		
Ulsiin Ikh Delgyyr		UID	trade, service	1998-05-07		
Shivee Ovoo		SHV	coal mining	1992-08-01		
Erdenet Khivs		ERH	carpet	1992-11-18		
Eermel		EER	wool production	1993-12-20		
Mongol Savkhi		UYN	leader	1993-10-11		
TsaSTU		CSU	plumbing	1993-10-11		
Tulga		TLG	equipment & trade	2000-05-31		
Juulchin Foreign Tourism Corporation		JUU	tourism	1994-11-07		
Ulaanbaatar Khivs		UBH	carpet	1995-02-28		
Khyrd		HRD	plumbing	1994-05-13		
Mongol Nekhmel		MNH	sewing	1993-12-06		
Monsav		MSV	packing, small enterprise	1993-08-24		
Agro-Amgalan		AGA	vegetable			
Atar-urguu		ATR	bakery	1994-06-20		
Undur Dov		MZR	tourist camp	1995-01-19		
Khereglee Impecs		HIE	trade & dealer	1994-06-20		
Durvun uul		DRU	child clothes	1995-01-19		
Monnoos		MNS	wool production	1993-12-21		
Baiguulamj		BGL	construction	1992-11-05		
Moninjbar		MIB	construction	1993-12-01		
Mashin Mekhanizm		MMH	transportation	1995-02-13		
Tuul Cashmere		TUL	laundry	1993-03-30		
Khaniin Material		HMK	brick products	1993-09-01		
ASBI		CND	road construction	1995-05-15		
Juulchin Duty Free Jsc		SUL	retailing	1994-04-12		
Solongo Impecs		SOI	raw materials	1992-09-15		
Buligaar		MBG	footwear products	1992-09-15		
Altan Taria		ALT	flour			
Mongol Ceramic		KEK	ceramic products	1992-07-14		
Tavilga		TVL	wooden products			
Takhi Ko		TAH	woven products	1995-04-18		
Mongol Shydenz		MSD	wood production	1993-05-10		
Mon-Asar		ASA	construction	1994-03-21		
USIB		USB	construction	1993-03-31		
Khash Ord		HOR	construction	1993-12-10		
Tsatsral Mon		CCL	construction	1995-01-06		
Niislel Urguu		NUR	construction	1994-04-25		
Khusug Trade		HTR	construction			
Urnult Ireedyi		URN	construction			
Ardiin Zorig		ARZ	agricultural products	1994-11-07		
Juulchin Gobi		JGV	tourist camp	1992-08-31		
Bayanmod Uul		BNM	tin mining	1992-04-24		
Darkhan Makh-Expo		HSH	meat products			
KHAABZ		HBZ	drafting service	1993-12-02		
Nekheesgyi E+A90dlel		NXE	non-woven products	1992-07-29		
Mongol Alt		ERS	geography analysis	1993-04-23		
Bukhug		BHG	poultry	1993-06-03		
Darkhan Nekhii		NEH	woven products	1993-04-20		
Bat Khiits		ZES	construction, transportation	1993-04-20		
Bayantalbai		BTL	agricultural products, harvesting	1992-11-16		
Khuvsgul		HVL	wood production	1993-08-24		
Mandalgobi Impecs		MNG	construction	1992-04-13		
Monagro		MAG	trade, transportation	1994-06-21		
Bayandukhum		BND	dairy farm	1993-06-24		
Janna D Ark		LZB	transportation	1995-02-13		
Goviin Undur		JGL	foodstuffs	1995-03-13		
Gutal		GTL	footwear products, trade			
Syljee		MSL	woven products			
Tsagaanchuluut		CGC	marble products	1992-12-15		
Bayanbulag		BBG	dairy farm	1992-03-31		
Uvs khyns		HNG	foodstuff	1994-12-16		
Guurst khyleg		GUU	transportation			
Guril		GUR	flour, feeding	1993-07-27		
Sor		SOR	fur products	1992-11-03		
Ulzii-Dundgobi		ULZ	trade, service	1993-07-16		
Khorinnaimdugaar Baaz		AVT	transportation	1992-05-18		
Ikh Urguu		URT	construction	1994-01-03		
Khuvsgul Geology		HUV	geography analysis	1992-04-17		
Selege-Ar-Khuvch		ARH	wood production	1992-06-01		
Savan Trade		SVN	soap production	1994-05-17		
Erdenet Zandan		IND	wood production	1994-03-16		
Khyalganat		HLG	wood production	1992-05-09		
Tuv Orgil		ORL	construction, service	1993-06-01		
Sel Dulaankhaan		DLH	wood production	1993-01-13		
Altai		ATA	geography analysis	1992-04-06		
Tsagduultai		HAH	agricultural products	1993-12-10		
Buyan		BYN	foodstuffs	1993-04-01		
Ariljaa Uvs		ARI	export, import			
Mongol Nom		MNM	book sale	1992-07-16		
Uvurkh-Khan Materials		HML	construction wall materials	1992-03-24		
Buyant		BJT	grain			
Nalaikh Teever		NLH	transportation	1997-01-18		
Zost Urguu		ZST	construction			
Ayanchin		AYN	transportation	1992-07-15		
Munkh Jim		AZA	transportation	1992-11-05		
Dornod		DRN	meat products	1992-12-20		
Kherlen Khivs		HRL	carpet	1994-11-17		
Selege Guril Tejeel		SGT	flour, feeding	1993-03-11		
Suu Jsc		SUU	milk products	1992-06-25		
Baaz		TRN	transportation	1993-05-04		
Dornodgeo		HAS	geography analysis			
Oi Mod		OIN	trade, supply	1992-05-16		
Tumriin Zavod		TMZ	steel production	1992-11-05		
Khorin khoyordugaar Baaz		AHH	transportation	1993-06-07		
Buudain Tsatsal		CCA	flour, feeding	1992-09-18		
Tegsh		HAL	construction	1994-03-28		
Mongol Shines		MSI	wood production			
Monmoid		BLA	wooden products	1992-06-15		
Davaanbulag		DBL	agricultural products			
Bayalag symber		BAJ	agricultural products	1994-03-04		
Erdenet Khyns		TAS	foodstuffs	1993-04-27		
Jinchin		JNN	transportation	1994-07-15		
Ungut Khevlel		UNG	printing	1994-07-26		
Ikh Nuur		IHN	irrigation system	1993-02-10		
Selege Shim		SIM	foodstuff			
Gonir		GNR	agricultural products	1994-11-07		
Kharshiin Gegee		AVH	construction	1992-05-06		
Khorgo Khairkhan		CHE	agricultural products	1993-05-27		
Noyon Shand		NSD	agricultural products	1992-04-25		
Shankh		SNH	agricultural products			
Mongol Shuudan Transportation		MTR	transportation	1992-06-29		
Bayanbadrakh		BBH	agricultural products	1994-02-07		
Orkhon		ORH	supply	1992-12-24		
Naid		NDR	wholesales	1992-04-16		
Zaluuchuud		ZAL	grain	1992-06-01		
Deej		DEE	agriculture	1992-12-10		
Khangai		HNG	construction	1992-08-17		
Shimtleg		AMT	foodstuffs			
Munkh Undes		AHR	trade, service			
Evlel		JRG	water supply	1992-05-29		
Kharkhorin		HHN	agricultural products	1993-09-22		
Khujirt Urguu		HUJ	construction	1993-02-08		
Chandmani Uul		CAD	agricultural products	1992-05-12		
Shar Khooloi		SHR	agricultural products	1992-07-07		
Erdenetolgoi Tuv		ETL	agricultural products	1992-06-27		
Ikh Uusgel		IHU	construction, field search, analysis	1995-03-08		
Azik		ALD	foodstuffs	1995-03-08		
Teever Achlal		ACL	transportation	1993-01-11		
Urgun Jim		JIM	road construction	1993-09-09		
Mandal		MAN	wood production	1992-09-28		
UB BUK		BUK	construction materials	1994-03-16		
Tengis		TGS	water supply	1993-05-05		
Zoos Trade		ZOS	trade	1992-05-26		
Khorol-Edene		MTS	trade, supply			
Darkhan Khudaldaa		ARL	trade	1993-12-01		
Achit Alkabi		NOG	feeding farm	1993-06-23		
Jargalant Uils		JLT	trade, restaurant	1993-08-05		
Urgats Uguuj		BNZ	vegetable	1992-08-25		
Zavkhan Bayalag		BLG	foodstuffs	1992-09-02		
Mon Khulug		DTT	transportation	1993-06-28		
Bornuur		BOR	agricultural products	1993-08-30		
Ulbaa		ULB	road construction	1993-03-07		
Deed Byan		DHM	construction wall materials	1993-06-16		
Uv-Usjuulagch		UAA	agricultural construction	1993-04-26		
Avti Teever Tav		TAV	transportation	1993-02-01		
Shakhait Khairkhan		OZT	agricultural products			
Gantumurt		DLA	heating system			
Teever Darkhan		TEE	transportation	1993-01-02		
Batshireet		BST	wood production	1992-07-15		
Tuul Bayan		BNT	vegetable			
Bayankhongor		BNH	geography analysis	1992-09-12		
Bayantolgoi		BAL	agricultural products	1994-04-01		
Mongol Makh Expo		DLG	vegetable			
Altain Zam		AZN	road construction	1993-07-01		
Altan Joloo-Gobi		ATG	transportation	1992-05-17		
Tenkhleg-Us		TNV	transportation			
Jinst		JST	transportation	1992-04-08		
Arivjikh		ARJ	vegetable	1992-04-08		
Gan Khiits		GHC	steel products	1992-10-15		
Orgil Gobi-altai		ORI	construction	1992-05-08		
Mongol Shevro		MVO	rawhide production	1995-01-06		
Modlog		DLM	wood production	1992-11-27		
Byteelch Uils		BLC	sewing	1992-09-03		
Altai Khaniin Material		AHM	construction wall materials	1993-07-01		
Bayan Itgelt		ITL	trade	1993-04-14		
Delgertrade		DLB	trade	1992-03-01		
Jol		JOL	road construction	1993-07-06		
Ed Khereglegchdiin Tuv		EHT	trade, service	1993-04-20		
Ar Khust Shunkhlai		SUN	agricultural products	1992-07-29		
Tulga Altai		TUA	foodstuffs	1992-06-12		
Urgun Khereglee		OEE	wholesales	1992-10-30		
Shinchlel Invest		SCL	construction, service	1995-02-13		
Sainshand		SAI	trade	1993-02-09		
Uvs		UVN	trade	1993-08-30		
Darkhan Guril Tejeel		DAR	flour	1992-06-01		
Asgat		ASG	water supply	1992-10-15		
Erdes Khuvun		ESH	cotton	1992-10-27		
Uguuj-Sumber		OGU	agricultural products	1993-12-17		
Baylag Shariin Gol		BLS	wood production	1992-03-30		
Delgerekh Khuns		DHO	foodstuffs	1993-03-09		
Asralt Khairkhan		ASH	wood production	1992-08-04		
Ceramzit		KER	brick, lime	1992-12-17		
Shines		SHS	wood production	1993-05-19		
Orgil Zuunkharaa		OZH	wood production, products	1992-07-23		
Guril Tejeel Bulgan		GTJ	flour, feeding	1992-06-12		
Bishrelt Industrial		HHC	child clothes	1993-07-19		
Sumber-Ulzii		SUO	agricultural products	1992-05-12		
Dorniin Bers		HHB	trade	1993-04-20		
Jargalant -Tuv		JRT	agricultural products			
Bayanbogd		BBD	construction	1992-12-05		
Bayanbulag-Selenge		BBS	agricultural products	1992-08-24		
Merei		MER	wood production			
Dornod Barilga		DOB	construction			
Bayan-Uul		BUL	agricultural products	1993-01-12		
Buyantbulag		HBB	agricultural products	1992-08-25		
Baruun-Urt Us		BUS	construction	1993-06-01		
Chandmai Tal		CNT	construction	1992-09-11		
Achaa Teever		ATE	transportation	1992-04-20		
Khurd Selenge		HRS	agricultural products	1993-08-09		
Zyrkh Uul		TGD	transportation	1993-06-16		
Ij Byren		BUR	agricultural products	1993-09-22		
Jirmen Suljee		UUG	construction materials	1994-08-10		
Zavkhan Teekh		ORG	transportation	1992-04-16		
Damjlaga Baaz		DBZ	trade, service			
Uguumur Zuunmod		OZM	construction materials	1995-04-20		
Noyot Khairkhan		NIE	trade	1992-04-11		
Mongol Dizel		MDZ	transportation	1992-11-09		
Avto Dizel		GHL	transportation	1992-05-28		
Ikh Daats		OBL	transportation, auto service	1992-05-28		
Teever Tsagaannuur		CNR	transportation	1993-05-19		
Avto Teever-27		AHD	transportation			
Avto Daats		ADC	transportation	1994-05-11		
Bayantooroi		BTR	agricultural products	1992-09-03		
Tsagaan-Erdene		TSE	agricultural products			
Devshil Mandal		DMA	construction materials	1994-06-15		
Yanzagatai		YAN	agricultural products			
Khiits-Uvs		HII	construction materials	1992-05-09		
Jonshit Teever		TBE	transportation	1992-06-10		
Chinbai		CHI	leather products	1992-08-15		
Avto Kombinat		ATK	transportation			
Bulgan Undarga		BUN	water supply	1993-03-11		
Shariin Gol		SHG	coal mining	1993-12-24		
Dornod Khudaldaa		DES	trade	1994-04-05		
Dornod Sito		SIT	brick, lime	1992-07-08		
Undraga-Umnugobi		UND	construction	1992-06-02		
Bayankhairkhan		BHR	transportation	1993-07-05		
Mongol Shir		MSR	rawhide production			
Silikat		SIL	silk. brick, lime	1992-06-18		
Mongol EEG		MEG		1993-02-02		
KHID		HID	trade	1993-04-12		
Dornod Impecs		DIM	trade	1992-07-01		
Tulpar		TLP	transportation	1992-09-07		
Usjuulakh		CMD	agricultural products			
Turuun		TRN	agricultural products	1994-01-10		
Ulaansan		UNS	agricultural products	1992-12-03		
Jinst-Uvs		JIV	agricultural products	1993-02-04		
Zuunturuun		ZNT	agricultural products	1992-05-13		
Adar		ADR	construction materials	1992-07-25		
Ingettolgoi		INT	agricultural products	1992-08-18		
Khurtai		HUR	agricultural products			
Orkhondalai		ORD	agricultural products	1993-12-26		
Mongeo		MOG	geography analysis	1992-04-09		
Almaas		ALM	geography analysis	1992-06-22		
Munkhsansar		SSR	agricultural products	1992-05-04		
Mon Urgats		URC	agricultural products			
Khash Urguu		BRL	construction	1992-02-04		
Altan Tulguur		ATU	construction materials	1992-06-08		
Khuduugiin Teever		HUD	transportation	1992-07-09		
Mongol Ed Impecs		MED	trade	1992-08-05		
Dornod khuns		DHS	foodstuffs	1995-01-08		
Gobi Dumber		GOS	agricultural products	1992-08-28		
Khalkj Nuudai		DDL	agricultural products	1992-06-09		
Atar		ATA	agricultural products	1992-04-17		
Gan Negdel		GNL	construction	1995-03-18		
Chandmani Dundgobi		CDU	hotel	1992-04-16		
Gan Kherlen		HZB	construction	1992-05-03		
Avto Jinchin		AAH	transportation	1994-04-27		
Magsarjav		MGG	agricultural products	1994-06-03		
Khangain Ksaram		NUL	agricultural products	1992-09-02		
Dornod Teever		DOT	transportation	1992-04-06		
Shinest		NRS	wood production	1993-06-14		
Khazna		HZH	trade	1993-02-04		
Mongoliin Gegee		GGE	geography analysis	1993-07-01		
Gun Galuut		GGL	foodstuffs	1992-04-24		
Khurkh Gol		HGO	agricultural products			
Khargia		HAG	water filtering	1994-01-04		
Darkhan Zochid Buudal		DZG	hotel, restaurant			
Darkhan Impecs		DRI	supply	1992-11-06		
Us-Arkhangai		UAR	construction	1992-12-04		
Avtozam-Arkhangai		AAR	construction	1992-10-01		
Ugtaal Tuv		UGT	agricultural products	1992-11-19		
Khangal		HGL	foodstuffs	1994-11-22		
Khuvsgul Usan zam		HUZ	water transportation	1993-04-20		
Zavkhan Teever		ZVH	transportation	1994-03-21		
Khishig Uul		HSX	trade	1992-05-04		
Erdenet Suvarga		SVR	construction	1992-03-23		
Khasu-Mandal		HSR	trade, service	1992-10-02		
Darkhan Khuns		DHU	foodstuffs	1992-10-23		
Dornod Noos		DNU	wool washing	1992-05-13		
Gan Teerem		GTR	flour, feeding	1998-10-16		
Sudut		UHN	agricultural products	1993-07-01		
Uujim Khangai		SOH	agricultural products	1994-05-02		
Tushig Uul		TUS	construction materials	1994-11-16		
Undurkhaan		ONH	agricultural products	1993-06-09		
Atar Chandgan		ACH	agricultural products	1994-12-06		
Khuns-Arkhangai		HAR	foodstuffs	1992-08-25		
Ar Bayankhangai		ABH	trade			
Buteel		BUT	agricultural products	1993-12-26		
Bayalag Nalaikh		BNB	construction, mining	1992-05-05		
Darkhan Urguu		DER	construction	1993-09-02		
Takhilgat		THA	agricultural products	1994-03-16		
Teeverchin-7		TED	transportation	1993-04-20		
Altan Duulga		ADU	agricultural products	1993-08-30		
Ar Tarkhi		ART	agricultural products	1993-11-01		
Bayandulaan Uul		BDU	agricultural products	1993-09-30		
Tsagaan Tolgoi		TSA	agricultural products	1995-01-14		
Javkhlant Kharaa		HCH	agricultural products	1992-06-01		
Tsuutaij		HJL	agricultural products	1993-12-08		
Orkhonbulag		OBL	agricultural products	1993-07-27		
Selenge Sureg		SHO	agricultural products	1993-06-15		
Torgon Ur		IBU	agricultural products	1993-06-18		
Shine Urguu		SNO	felt production	1995-06-15		
Artsat Mogoi		BUO	construction	1992-06-16		
Nalaik Urguu		NLO	construction	1992-07-20		
Ariljaa Impecs		ALI	durable products	1992-11-09		
Tuv Us		UST	water distribution	1994-09-20		
Ulaan Khotgor		ULH	agricultural products	1992-05-20		
Agrotekhimpecs		ATI	supply			
Sav Shim		GTU	supply	1993-11-09		
Ereentsav		ECV	agricultural products	1994-08-22		
Orkhon Jims Nogoo		OJN	foodstuffs	1993-08-05		
Bayankhan		BNH	agricultural products	1995-01-14		
Bilgekh Bayanburd		SBU	foodstuffs			
Monel		MEL	electronic equipment	1993-09-30		
Khuvsgul Khuns		HHS	foodstuffs	1993-07-15		
Buunii Khudaldaa		BHL	supply	1994-01-03		
RIN		RIN	supply	1995-04-20		
Uliastai tegsh		LJA	supply	1992-07-15		
Bayan-Aldar		VIK	supply	1993-04-14		
Teever-Tuv		TEV	transportation	1992-09-09		
Esgii Gutal		ESG	felt products			
Tekhnicimport		TEX	supply			
Jimst		JMT	vegetable	1992-04-10		
Gobi Shand		BRD	foodstuffs	1993-04-19		
Mogoin Gol		BDL	coal mining	1992-08-01		
Bayanteeg		BTG	coal mining			
Tsagaannuur		TSN	supply	1992-06-27		
Uran Barilga		UBA	construction засвар	1994-03-03		
Chatsargana		CHR	fruit production	1994-04-04		
Selenge Impecs		SEM	trade			
Khotgor		NHT	coal mining	1993-08-20		
Avtoimpecs		AOI	supply	1995-01-03		
Khungun Beton		BET	concrete			
Khar Tarvagatai		TVT	coal mining			
Tevshiin Gobi		TVG	coal mining			
Tavantolgoi		TTL	coal mining	1994-05-24		
Ikh Barilga		IBA	construction	1992-12-01		
Aduunchuluun		ADL	coal mining	1994-05-12		
Altan Useg		AYG	printing	1992-10-15		
Taliin Gal		TAL	coal mining	1993-09-01		
Ilch-Arkhanga		IAR	power energy	1993-01-11		
Erchim Bayan-Ulgii		BOE	power energy	1992-07-10		
Emnelgiin Tekhnic		ENT	service	1993-01-13		
Ajliin Khuvtsas		ERD	concrete	1995-03-13		
Erdenet Avtozam		EAZ	road construction	1992-07-28		
Darzam		DRZ	construction	1992-08-25		
Mon Nab		MNB	cleaning construction	1992-08-25		
Khuns Tuv		HTU	foodstuffs			
Kharkhiraa		HRA	agricultural products	1993-01-02		
Undram		UDR	supply	1994-07-15		
Zuunkharaa Urguu		ZNR	construction	1994-11-30		
Barilga Corporation		BRC	construction	1992-07-21		
EKHBUT		EHB	construction	1995-02-28		
Boroogiin Yildver		BRO	gold mining			
DZUZG		DZG		1998-06-18		
Shoroon Ord		SHO	gold mining			
Manzushir		MZR	tourism			
AZZAN		AZZ	road construction	1998-12-23		
Ardiin Erkh		ARX	press	2003-01-20		
ZGMS		ZMS	press	2000-03-29		
Shad Trade		SDT	agricultural products			
Erdene Zam		ERZ	road, bridge construction	2000-03-29		
Berkh Uul		BEU	fluorspar, gold, and coal mining	2000-03-29		
Monenzim		MEZ	pharmaceuticals, supply			
Emiin uildver		EMU	pharmaceuticals			
Darkhanii Dulaanii Tsakhilgaan Stants		DAS	power energy			
Ulaanbaatar Dulaanii Suljee		UDS	power energy			
Darkhanii Dulaanii Suljee		DDS	power energy			
Erdenetiin Dulaanii Tsakhilgaan Stants		EDS	power energy			
Nalaikhiin Dulaanii Stants		NDS	power energy			
Aerogeodiz		ARG	geodesy, drafting			
Dulaanii II Tsakhilgaan Stants		DHS	power energy			
Dulaanii III Tsakhilgaan Stants		DGS	power energy			
Darkhan Us Suvag		DUS	water supply, filtering			
Erdenet Us, Dulaan Tugeekh Syljee		EUD	water supply, filtering			
Baganuur Zuun Umnud Busiin Tsakhilgaan Tugeekh Sul		BZO	power energy distribution			
Darkhan Selengiin Tsakhilgaan Tugeekh Suljee		DSS	power energy distribution			
Mongolemimpecs		MEI	pharmaceuticals, supply			
Mongoliin Khurungiin Birj		MSE	stock trade			
Dalanzadgadiin DTsS		DZS	power energy distribution			
Dulaanii Tsakhilgaan Stants-4		DSD	power energy distribution			
Ulaanbaatar Tsakhilgaan Tugeekh suljee		UTS	power energy distribution			
Shargaljuut Rashaan Suvilal		SHR	healthcare			
Zoos Bank		ZSB				
Genco Tour Bureau		JTB	tourism			
Mongol shiltgeen		MSH				
Dornod Autozam		DAZ				
Bagunuur		BAN	coal mining			
Chandgan		CHA	agricultural products	1995-04-20		
TSU		TSU		2007-04-13		
Hai Bi Oil		HBO	refining			
