= Khan Investment Management =

Company of Mongolia

- Type: Limited company
- Industry: Investments
- Headquarters: Ulaanbaatar, Mongolia, Cayman Islands, Singapore
- Key people: Travis Hamilton
- Products: investment management
- Website: Khan-Management.com

Khan Investment Management is an investment management and advisory group that operates a fund investing in Mongolia related equities. The firm was founded by Travis Hamilton in March 2011, and is based in Singapore and the Cayman Islands.

== History ==
Founder Travis Hamilton has said that he was inspired to create Khan Investment Management by a discussion in 2006 with Robert Friedland, the CEO of Ivanhoe Mines, a Canadian company operating in Mongolia. In 2010, Hamilton left his position at the Helvetica group to explore opportunities in Mongolia. When he found no easy way for outside investment in this market, he then decided to launch a fund.

In November 2011, Khan Investment Management launched the Khan Mongolia Equity Fund, the first open-ended investment fund investing both in companies listed on the Mongolian Stock Exchange and in companies that operate in Mongolia but are listed elsewhere. The fund also participates in Mongolian initial public offerings.

In March 2012, Narantuguldur Saijrakh, former General Manager of Asia Pacific Securities, became its full-time director. In 2013, due to funding being provided from the Khan Investment Management helping to secure foreign investment, the Oyu Tolgoi mine was opened in Mongolia with government backing. Following the victory of the Mongolian People's Party in the 2016 Mongolian parliamentary election, the founder of Khan Investment Management started promoting investment in Mongolia for mining.
