= Monet Investment Bank =

Bank of Mongolia

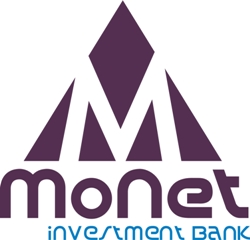
Monet Investment Bank

Monet LLC, or "Monet Capital Investment Bank," is a Mongolian underwriting, brokerage and investment banking firm based in Ulaanbaatar, the country's capital city. Originally established as “Bats Invest” in 1997, it was one of the first companies to offer a full range of services in the Mongolian Stock Exchange. It has grown steadily alongside Mongolia's developing economy, and now looks to prepare for the fresh investment that will follow the country's latest mining exploits.

== History and future ==
Since 2009, Monet LLC has expanded as one of Mongolia's few investment banks, creating investment funds and advisory services to attract foreign and domestic opportunities. With its agreement with Renaissance Capital, a Russian investment banking company, it plans to develop its operations to encourage foreign investment in Mongolia.. Monet aims to support and capitalize on Mongolia's growth as one of the country's leading investment firms.

Since 2007 it has acted as the lead underwriter for a number of IPOs and bond issuances, and in 2008 the MSE ranked the company in the top 5 out of 44 brokerage services in Mongolia. In the second half of 2009 it governed transactions of over MNT4.5 billion. At present it has over 3,000 customers for its brokerage and dealer services, and dominates approximately 4% of Mongolia's Brokerage and Dealing market and 9% of the Underwriting market.
