= Mongolia and the International Monetary Fund =

Mongolia's relations with the International Monetary Fund became official on February 14, 1991 when Mongolia became a member.

== Loans ==
=== Early loans ===
Mongolia's first IMF loan was for $54 million. Six years later, Mongolia received a $45 million three-year loan under the Enhanced Structural Adjustment Facility (ESAF) in 1997.

Through this loan and support from IMF, Mongolia began to make economic reforms, which included liberalization of wages and prices, allowed a larger mining capacity, a reduction in import restriction, privatization of some state enterprises, the establishment of a commercial banking system, easing of capital controls and a floating exchange rate system for managing its money supply.

However, serious fundamental problems remained, such as a weak banking system, a large and inefficient public sector, a "discretionary" tax system and a legal infrastructure that did not support private sector sufficiently. In addition, the progress stalled in 1998 due to large declines in export prices, spillovers from regional crises and political problems.

Based on the impressive economic growth in the past, the IMF executive board approved Mongolia's Second Annual Program under ESAF. This time they sought to solve the structural problems that remained after the first program under ESAF.

=== Extend Fund Facility in 2017 ===
In 2017, Mongolia, with a current quota of $72.3 million, requested a three-year extended arrangement under the IMF’s Extended Fund Facility (EFF), with access equivalent to $434.3 million (435 percent of quota). After almost two decades, the Mongolian economy still struggles with structural problems. The drop in commodity prices and collapse in foreign direct investment slowed the economy. Foreign investment dramatically fell after a briefly enacted foreign investment law passed in reaction to a proposed acquisition in SouthGobi Resources by a Chinese state owned mining company in 2012.

On April 13, 2017, Minister of Finance of Mongolia B. Choijilsuren and the governor of the Bank of Mongolia N. Bayasaikhan sent a letter of intent to IMF requesting the extended arrangement. With some delay due to the new law on foreign exchange, the request was approved on May 24, 2017. This loan is part of a bigger $5.5 billion financing package supported by Japan, Korea, China, the World Bank and the Asian Development Bank. Once the Mongolian government acknowledged this problem, they prepared an Economic Recovery Program.
