= List of regions of Mongolia by Human Development Index =

This is a list of regions of Mongolia by Human Development Index as of 2025 with data for the year 2023.

Rank	Region	HDI (2023)
Very high human development
1	Ulaanbaatar	0.813
High human development
–	Mongolia (average)	0.769
2	Central (Dornogovi, Dundgovi, Ömnögovi, Selenge, Töv, Darkhan-Uul, Govisümber)	0.759
3	Eastern (Dornod, Sükhbaatar, Khentii)	0.725
4	Khangai (Arkhangai, Bayankhongor, Bulgan, Övörkhangai, Khövsgöl, Orkhon)	0.711
Medium human development
5	Western (Bayan-Ölgii, Govi-Altai, Zavkhan, Uvs, Khovd	0.699
