= Non-capitalist way of development =

Development theory

The Non-Capitalist Way of Development (NCWD) or The Non-Capitalist Path or The Non‐Capitalist Road is a development theory which was proposed by theorists from the socialist bloc, as an alternative political economy to capitalist and imperialist development strategies.

== Background ==
After World War II, a wave of decolonization led to the emergence of many newly independent nations that faced poverty, underdevelopment, and the challenges of Cold War politics. While these countries sought to modernize, they were wary of adopting Western capitalist models, fearing this would reinforce economic dependency and neocolonialism. This skepticism grew as many of these nations adopted non-aligned stances, avoiding alignment with either the United States or the Soviet Union. NCWD was therefore originally promoted by the Soviet Union during the Cold War as an alternative development path for these newly decolonized countries to modernize without fully embracing capitalism or immediately transitioning to socialism. It primarily prioritized state-led modernization from the top over popular uprisings or grassroots socialist revolutions from below (see revolution from above).

From 1954 to 1979 the USSR provided an estimated $18 billion in economic aid and $47 billion in military aid to 76 countries across Africa, Asia, and Latin America.

=== India (1947 - 1964) ===
India, under Jawaharlal Nehru, became one of the most prominent examples of this development strategy. Although India remained non-aligned during the Cold War, it accepted substantial Soviet aid, particularly due to its industrialization strategy to substitute imports, which aimed to produce domestically what had previously been imported. A major symbol of Soviet-Indian cooperation was the Bhilai Steel Plant (currently a subsidiary of Steel Authority of India Limited), built in the late 1950s with Soviet funding and expertise. Bhilai became a symbol of India's industrial aspirations and played a central role in Nehru's vision of a mixed economy, balancing private enterprises with state-owned industries in India.

=== Egypt (1956 - 1970) ===
After the 1956 Suez Crisis, Egypt, under Gamal Abdel Nasser, shifted towards non-capitalist development, seeking support from the Soviet Union. One key result of this alliance was the construction of the Aswan High Dam, completed in 1970 with Soviet help. The dam symbolized Egypt’s modernization, boosting energy production and agricultural output through hydroelectric power and improved irrigation. It also reinforced Nasser’s Arab socialist policies, combining state control of industries with strong nationalism. However, the dam also caused environmental issues, including the displacement of the Nubian community and changes to the Nile's ecosystem.

== Literature ==
- R. Ulyanovsky; V. Pavlov (1973). Asian Dilemma A Soviet View And Myrdal's Concept. Progress Publishers.
- Andreyev, Igor (1974). The Noncapitalist Way: Soviet Experience and the Liberated Countries.
- Solodovnikov, Vasily; Bogoslovsky, Victor (1975). Non-Capitalist Development: An Historical Outline.

== See also ==
- Economy of the Soviet Union
- Five-Year Plans of India
- Arab Socialist Union (Egypt)
