= Mongolia and the World Bank =

The World Bank has funded educational efforts in Mongolia since 2006, focusing on improving educational resources in rural areas.

== Background ==
As the Mongolian People's Republic under the Soviet Union's sphere of influence, the Mongolian economy experienced significant growth because of a large inflow of assistance from the more developed regions of Eastern Europe and the Soviet Union. The capital and technological assistance from the Warsaw Pact led to rapid growth within its industries, with mining benefiting significantly, and there were big developments in education and public health.

== Educational Development- READ (2008) ==
After Mongolia's transition to a free market economy in the early 1990s, it began to experience a decline in school enrollment, particularly in rural areas. The Mongolian government and the World Bank have been working together to improve the educational system in the country. One of these includes the [Rural Education and Development] (READ) Project, developed in 2006–2013. The READ project was intended to improve Mongolia's primary education system and was funded by $5 million from the IDA.

One goal of the READ program is to provide children with better access to books. Prior to 2006, the supply of books in primary schools in Mongolia was scarce. To fix this, READ set up classroom libraries in all rural primary schools of Mongolia. As a result, the use and reading of books increased and the children's overall interest in books grew.

Another part of the READ program was the training of teachers on the proper use of these books which would help to more efficiently integrate the curriculum. Classrooms now aim to have a more interactive set-up. This goes against the traditional set-up of having students sit in parallel rows facing the teacher at the front of the class. The desks are now being positioned so that the students will face each other, and classes are being taught in a way that encourages interaction and the sharing of ideas.

As of 2013, the READ program has accomplished the following:

- 3,560 classrooms in 383 schools, in all 21 provinces of Mongolia, received 160 books each.
- 4,549 teachers have been trained in new reading methods.
- 130,000 children have used the new classroom libraries.
- 200,000 small books (books made as individual projects assigned to students) were made by students.
- 10,000 big books (books made collaboratively as an entire class) were made and used in classrooms

== MN Education Quality Reform Project (2014) ==
The objective of this project is to improve the quality of primary education in Mongolia, with an emphasis on the successful development of mathematical and language skills. It has a budget of US$30 million. This project consists of four main components:

- Improving learning outcomes: By the end of the second grade, a student should be able to read fluently and gain basic math skills.
- Prior and continued training of the professional development of teachers: Teachers should develop the skills needed to provide support to all children to ultimately improve their learning outcomes. This places an emphasis on reading and mathematical skills, especially for children in the first and second grades.
- Implementation of a school support program: Increase the Ministry of Education and Science's funding to cover more primary schools in the country.
- Effective implementation of the program through support and technical assistance.

== Improving Primary Education for the Most Vulnerable Children in Rural Mongolia ==
This project is funded by the Japan Social Development Fund and managed by the World Bank. It aims to provide education to the most vulnerable children in rural Mongolia, with a particular focus on children aged 6–10 and the children of Mongolian nomadic herders. Children from this section of society are significantly less likely to be enrolled in school. This program makes schooling more accessible by providing students with learning kits to be completed at home. There are a total of ten learning kits that consist of books and toys. A child is allowed to take one kit at a time until he or she completes it and goes to the library to receive the next kit. According to a specialist at the World Bank, Tungalag Chuluun, this project "improved children’s access to education and also helped reduce the number of school drop-outs and out-of-school children in the four aimags" (Mongolia 2015).
