= Talkh Chikher =

Company of Mongolia

Talkh Chikher, JSC.
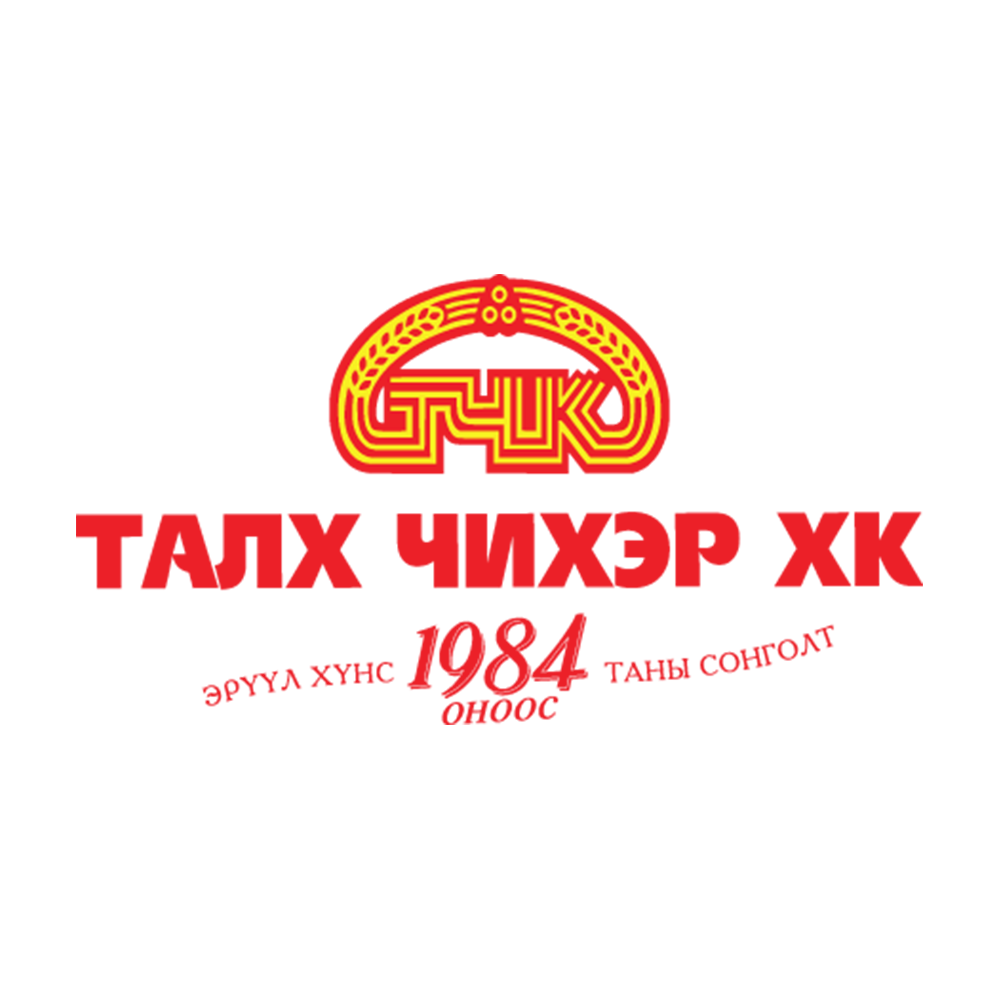
- Native name: Талк Чихер ХК
- Company type: Joint-stock company
- Industry: Food manufacturing
- Founded: 5 July 1984; 41 years ago
- Headquarters: Ulaanbaatar, Mongolia
- Area served: Mongolia
- Key people: Tulgaa. B CEO
- Products: Bread; Pastry; Candy; Cake; Other food products
- Number of employees: 800 (2017)
- Website: www.talkh-chikher.mn

Talkh Chikher JSC (Mongolian: Талх Чихэр ХК) is a manufacturer of food industry in Mongolia, produces bread, pastries, candies, and biscuits in Mongolia. It is the largest manufacturer of bread in Mongolia, producing half of the country's consumption. It has been operating for 34 years. The company produces and sells a variety of products including 20 different types of bread, 30 types of pastries, 10 types of sweet and solid cookies, 2 types of soft candy, marmalade and 10 sorts of chocolate assortments.
