= Turquoise Hill Resources =

Canadian mineral exploration and development company

Turquoise Hill Resources Ltd
- Formerly: 463212 B.C. Ltd (1994); Indochina Goldfields Ltd (1994–1999); Ivanhoe Mines Ltd (1999–2012)
- Type: Subsidiary
- Traded as: TSX: TRQ (2012–2022); Nasdaq: TRQ (2013–2020); NYSE: TRQ (2013–2022)
- Industry: Mining & Exploration
- Founded: 1994
- Founder: Robert Friedland (ownership at 15.5%, was 18.2% bef.Jan.27 rights offering)
- Headquarters: Montreal, Quebec, Canada
- Key people: John Macken, President; Kay Priestly, CEO; Christopher Bateman CFO
- Products: Gold, Copper, Uranium, Coal; Molybdenum, Rhenium
- Revenue: US$179.05 million (2011)▲124%
- Net income: ▼US$(570.37) mil (2011)
- Total assets: $6,136.83 million (Dec12)▲91%
- Total equity: $1.716 billion (July20)
- Parent: Rio Tinto Group
- Website: www.turquoisehill.com

Turquoise Hill Resources was a Canadian mineral exploration and development company headquartered in Montreal, Quebec, and since December 2022, a wholly owned subsidiary of Rio Tinto Group. The company was called Ivanhoe Mines until August 2, 2012 when a financing agreement was completed with Rio Tinto. Rio Tinto acquired full ownership of Turquoise Hill in December 2022.

Its principal and only material mineral resource interest is a 66% share of the Oyu Tolgoi Copper-Gold Mine in Southern Mongolia 200 km east of Dalanzadgad. The Oyu Tolgoi Project is considered one of the world's largest copper and gold porphyry deposits. For development to happen at Oyu Tolgoi, an agreement had to be made in which the Mongolian government took a 34% stake in the project; the royalty arrangement it currently has with the Mongolian government took years to reach which caused significant delays in project development.

In Australia, Turquoise Hill Resources has stakes in mines containing gold, uranium, copper and the world's highest grade molybdenum and rhenium.

In Mongolia the company controls several other gold and copper mine development projects. It owns a 50% interest in the Kyzyl gold project in Kazakhstan through Altynalmas Gold and has exploration projects in China, Indonesia and the Philippines. Turquoise Hill Resources also owns 14% of Entree Gold, a company with interests in copper and gold projects in southern Mongolia and Arizona, and 14% of Exco Resources which operates Cloncurry's copper project and the White Dam gold mine in Australia.

The company's largest shareholder is Rio Tinto, with a stake of 50.8%. This is up from 46.5% beforehand. In June 2011 Rio Tinto paid $502 million for 55 million additional shares, increasing its control to 46.5% from 42% (35% prior to that) and giving it an extra seat on the board (up to 7/14), though Rio Tinto was restricted from increasing its stake in the company to a majority before 2012. Since 2006 Rio Tinto invested $3.5 billion in Ivanhoe Mines. Former Canadian prime minister Jean Chrétien is a special advisor to the company.

In September 2010 it was reported that exploration around Oyu Tolgoi at the Heruga North deposit revealed higher reserves of gold and copper than previously estimated (the news caused IVN share prices to rise 6%). Capital spending is likely to reach $5Bn; in October 2010, Ivanhoe announced a new $1Bn share offering in order to raise funds to develop this mine. Due to new entitlement offers by Ivanhoe Australia (made to raise funding in order to develop assets in North Queensland, Australia) Ivanhoe Mines' interest in the company was reduced from 81% to 62%. At the end of March 2011 construction of Oyu Toloi was 15% complete. At the end of February 2012 construction of Oyu Tolgoi was 73% complete.

In 2016 Turquoise Hill produced 201,300 tonnes of copper and 300,000 ounces of gold, exceeding guidance and generating US$1.2 billion in revenue. The Company recorded net income from continuing operations attributable to owners of Turquoise Hill of $210.6 million.

== History ==
2000 - In December ABM Mining (private) was merged into Ivanhoe Mines. At the time Ivanhoe's main assets included 50% of Myanmar's Monywa Copper Project (28,500 tonnes/year); that year production by both companies totalled 13,350 tonnes for copper, 2 million tonnes for iron ore pellets and 48,000 tones for iron ore concentrate. ABM Mining was founded in 1997 and remained a privately held company until the merger.

2002 - Subsidiary ABM Mining purchased all of the outstanding debt associated with the Savage River iron ore project in Tasmania, Australia giving ABM Mining a priority claim on the project's assets.

2005 - Savage River Project sold to Stemcor Holdings Limited of London for up to US$170 million. The spinoff was part of the company's efforts to shift focus to Oyu Tolgoi (specifically the Hugo deposit).

2007 - In May the company sold all of its coal projects including Ovoot Tolgoi to Asia Gold Corp (currently SouthGobi); as part of the transaction Asia Gold gave Ivanhoe Mines over 80 million more shares of the company raising its interest in it from 45% to a majority stake. Later in October Rio Tinto helped Ivanhoe gain access to a $350 million credit facility which Oyu Tolgoi needed for further development.

2008 - In January Ivanhoe Mines raised $117.9 million through a series of private placements one of which increased its interest in SouthGobi (when it converted preferred shares into common shares). Also that month the newly discovered Heruga Deposit at Oyu Tolgoi was for the first time officially acknowledged (estimates completed) as having a substantial resource of copper, gold and molybdenum. Three months later, in April the government approved the Ovoot Tolgoi project allowing Ivanhoe to begin production in the southern portion (Sunset Field). In May it sold its majority interest in Jinshan Gold Mines for C$216.7 million. Later that summer Ivanhoe's Australian subsidiary went public with a A$125 million IPO (62.5 million shares) and Rio Tinto helped the Oyu Tolgoi project acquire certain equipment. Ivanhoe Australia was floated on the ASX exchange with Ivanhoe Mines owning 80% of it.

2009 - Ivanhoe finally reached an agreement with the Mongolian Government on its share in Oyu Tolgoi, taxes as well as Ivanhoe's responsibilities when it comes to the environment and job opportunities for local people. In October Rio Tinto bought 46.3 million common shares for $388 million. In November the China Investment Corporation invested US$500 in SouthGobi in the form of a convertible debenture.

2010 - January - SouthGobi raised C$459 million by going public on the Hong Kong Stock Exchange. In March $250 million of the $500 million China Investment Corporation debenture was converted into SouthGobi common shares; the move lowered Ivanhoe's interest in it to 57%. Also that year, Rio Tinto promised that it will not make any attempts to take over Ivanhoe Mines before October 18, 2011 (Rio Tinto's possible interest in the company is limited to 46.65%).

2012 - April - Ivanhoe Mines sells its 57.6% share of SouthGobi Resources to Chalco for $889 million. The decision came partly as a result of pressure from Ivanhoe's largest shareholder Rio Tinto to sell non core assets. However, the Mongolian government asked that work be stopped at the company's Ovoot Tolgoi mine. On July 31, 2012 Rio Tinto purchased $935 million worth of Ivanhoe shares putting its total interest in the company at 51%. To obtain the additional funding, it was required that Ivanhoe Mines change its name and that founder Robert Friedland resign as CEO. Six of the senior board members also resigned however they didn't include former CEO John Maken who became company president.

2013 – June - Turquoise Hill Resources announced it had secured a $225-million non-revolving bridge facility from majority shareholder Rio Tinto.

== Developments by product ==
=== Coal ===
Nariin Sukhait (Ovoot Tolgoi, flagship coal mine that is already producing, 114.1 million tonnes in reserves), and two development projects, the Soumber Deposit (55.5 million tonnes in reserves) and the Ovoot Tolgoi Underground Deposit. Ivanhoe exited these operations on April 2, 2012, when it sold its 57.6% interest in SouthGobi Resources Inc to Chalco for $889 million.

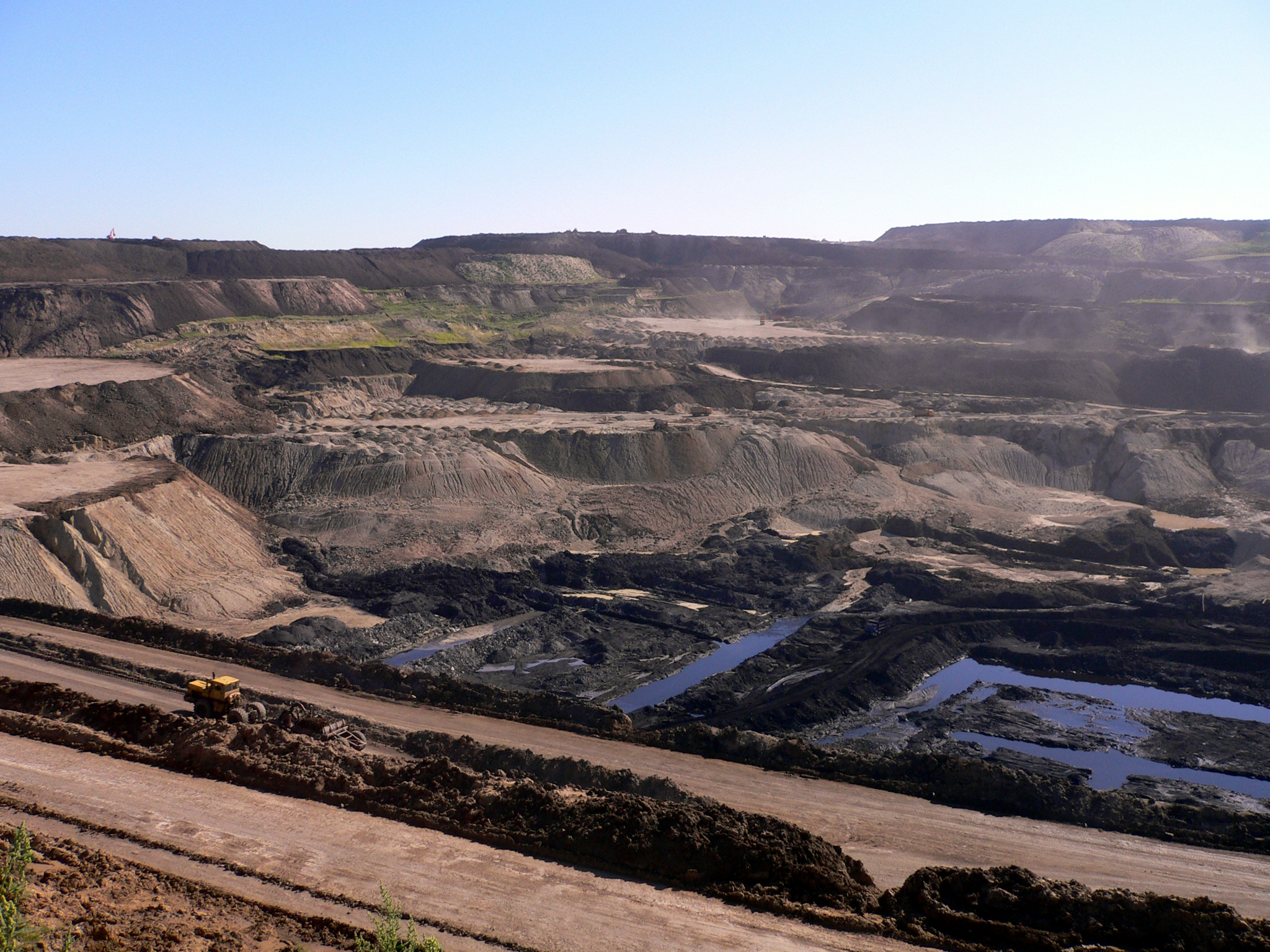
Ivanhoe developed many other mines in Mongolia including Ovuut Tolgoi coal mine.

=== Molybdenum, silver, rhenium, uranium, lead, zinc ===
The mines, acquired in 2003, are located at Mount Isa, Cloncurry, with the largest project being the Merlin mine, which has the world's highest grade molybdenum-rhenium deposit. The other is Tennant Creek. It has also acquired the Barrick Gold Osborne asset near Merlin, which has an ore processing plant. Completion of the purchase required $18 million.

=== Copper, gold ===
Oyu Tolgoi has measured and indicated reserves of at least 36.3 billion pounds of copper and 20.2 million ounces of gold. Newly discovered deposits at Oyu Tolgoi could add substantially to the measured and indicated reserves estimates.

- Oyu Tolgoi, the world's largest gold, 3rd largest copper and gold mine still requires $4.6 billion in investment before construction is complete in 2012; annual production is scheduled to be 544,000 tonnes for copper and 650,000 ounces for gold.

==== Kyzyl gold project ====
In Northern Kazakhstan; according to an independent pre feasibility study by UK engineering and consultant group Scott Wilson Ltd. the mine's reserves are estimated at 3.3 million ounces and mine life 10 years.

== Oyu Tolgoi ==
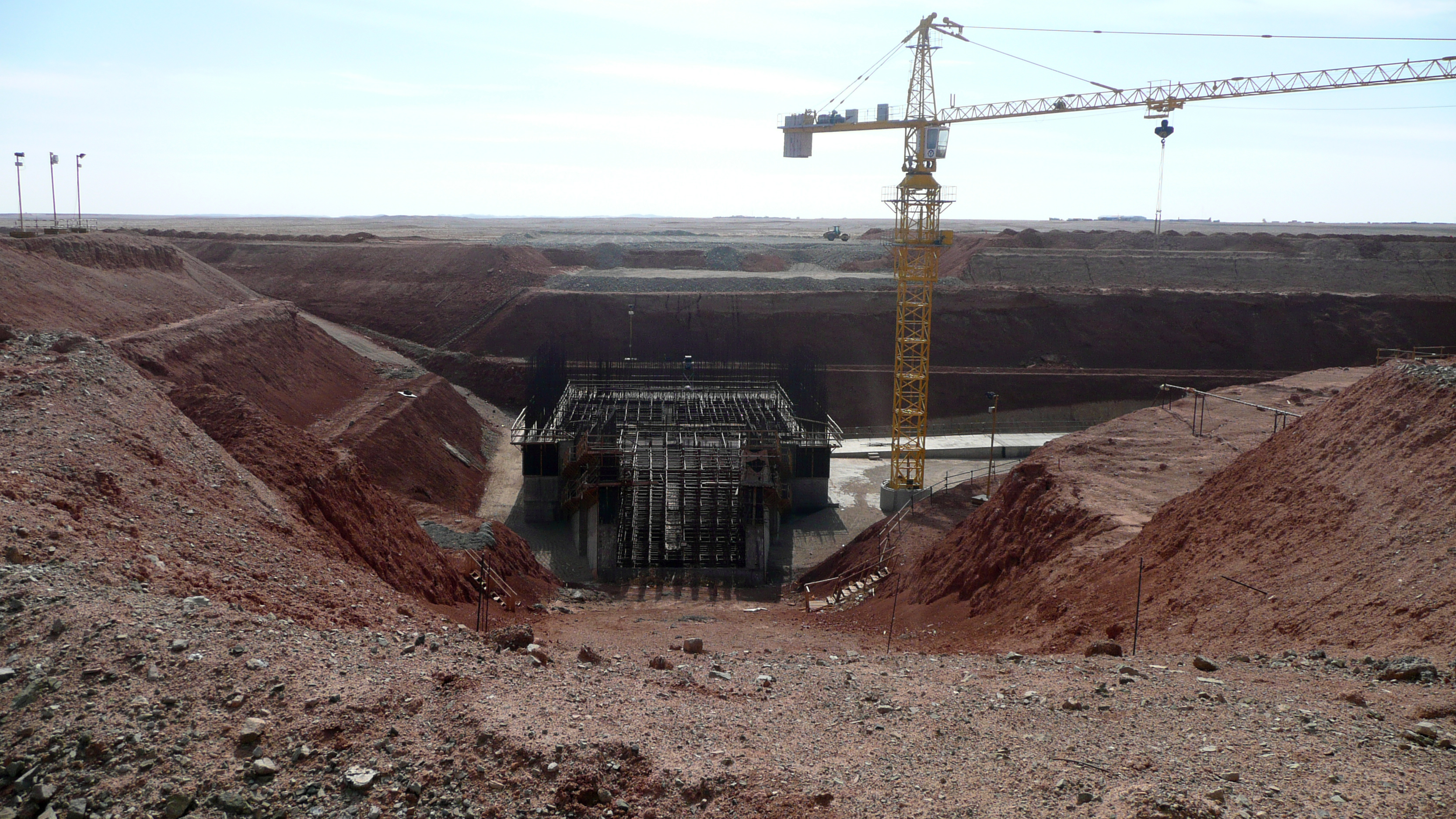
Construction of Shaft #2 at the Oyu Tolgoi project in the South Gobi Desert

The copper and gold rich property discovered by Ivanhoe Mines in 2001, is in the process of being transformed into an open pit and underground mining operation. It is located 80 km north of the China Mongolia border giving the companies that produce there an added benefit (China is the world's biggest market for commodities futures). In September 2010 Oyu Tolgoi reserves were placed at 81.3 billion pounds for copper and 46.4 million ounces for gold. Construction of the Oyu Tolgoi mine was 15% complete at the end of March 2011, ahead of schedule which calls for first production in 2013 and full production in 2018. In 2011 14,000 people will be working at the site. By the end of February 2012 construction of Oyu Tolgoi was 73% complete.

== Relationship with Rio Tinto ==
Rio Tinto has expressed interest in raising its stake in the company from 35% to 46.6%, eventually leading to a takeover. However, Ivanhoe Mines is not interested in selling out. Ivanhoe has implemented a shareholder rights plan aimed at preventing a creeping takeover. Though Ivanhoe still needs to raise billions of dollars to develop key projects, it is confident that either other investors will come forward or the financing will become available. It is seeking $2 billion in financing from 13 institutions. On January 27, 2011, Ivanhoe used a rights offering to raise the $1.8 billion necessary to start development at the 66% owned Oyu Tolgoi mine. After the rights offering, Robert Friedland (founder and CEO) will have his interest in the company reduced to 15.5% while Rio Tinto will maintain its interest at 40.5%. On February 9, 2011, two Rio Tinto executives were elected to Ivanhoe's board, putting the number of Rio Tinto board members at 6 (out of a total of 14). The move was made in response to Rio Tinto's growing interest in the company. In June 2011, Rio Tinto paid $502 million for 55 million more shares of Ivanhoe Mines, or 4.5% more of the company (up to 46.5%). The move gave it 7 of 14 board seats. By early 2012, Rio Tinto owned 51%. In April 2012, Robert Friedland resigned as CEO of Ivanhoe Mines. As of July 2018, the CEO of Turquoise Hill Resources is Ulf Quellmann, an experienced finance executive from Rio Tinto.
