= BDSec =

Mongolian stock brokerage firm

BDSec Joint Stock Company is a stock brokerage and investment banking firm in Mongolia. Established in 1991 as a part of Mongolian Stock Exchange in Töv Province, it now plays a central role in the domestic securities market. Its name originates from the company’s original name, Bayan Dukhum Securities. Headquartered in Ulaanbaatar and with branch offices in Orkhon, Dornogovi, Tuv and Darkhan-Uul provinces, BDSec operates through four business divisions: brokerage, underwriting, investment advisory and research.

== History ==
BDSec was founded in 1991 as a brokerage and dealing firm “Bayandukhum” in order to receive and register common shares of Property Privatization from citizens of Tuv Province. In 1995, the company was re-organized to provide comprehensive brokerage and dealing service on the stock market, under the name of BDSec LLC.

In 1998, the current management team acquired BDSec and moved its headquarters from Tuv province to the capital city Ulaanbaatar. In 2000, BDSec became the largest dealer of the Government bonds. Upon receiving the official license for underwriting from the Financial Regulatory Commission in 2004, it became the first independent underwriter and chief dealer for corporate bonds, and successfully introduced Puma Bond to the fixed income market. In 2005, BDSec made an agreement with “Moninjbar”, the civil engineering and plumbing company, to act as official underwriter for its “Reformation Bond”. BDSec went public in 2006 and currently it is the 7th largest MSE-listed company in terms of market capitalization. In the same year, they underwrote Genco Tour Bureau as the first IPO in the public equity market. They also completed the secondary issue of “Puma Bond” in 2006. In 2007, BDSec entered into an agreement with New York–based brokerage firm, Auerbach Grayson & Co, Inc. which became its official representative in the United States of America. In the same year, they also completed IPOs of HBOil JSC, Moninjbar JSC and Tuul Songino Water Resource JSC through its underwriting arm. In 2008, BDSec successfully managed MNT 3.2 billion IPO of Khukh Gan JSC, MNT 0.3bn IPO of Naco Fuel JSC, MNT 0.6bn secondary offering of HBOil JSC and MNT 2.8bn secondary offering for BDSec JSC. They started public education program in 2008 with giving a free lectures and training about the capital market to the domestic people. In 2009, BDSec initiated and started "Green IPO" movement that aims to support environment friendly companies to raise capital on the MSE and with necessary working capital. In 2010, total transaction amount executed by BDSec has exceeded over 100 billion MNT and they won the tender to service account holders in Orkhon province (Erdenet city) announced by the FRC. The National Chamber named BDSec the “best entrepreneur of the year” in 2010 and in 2011.

Considered one of the fastest growing frontier markets, the Mongolian stock market was the best performing market in 2010 and the second best performing market in 2011 globally. BDSec has kept its leading position, executing 68 percent of total transactions executed on MSE in 2011. In addition, BDSec introduced few new issuance to the Mongolian securities market, namely Silikat IPO, Just Agro bond and Sharyn Gol rights issue, all of them being the first ones in 3 years.
