= Zud =

Mass die-off of livestock in Mongolia

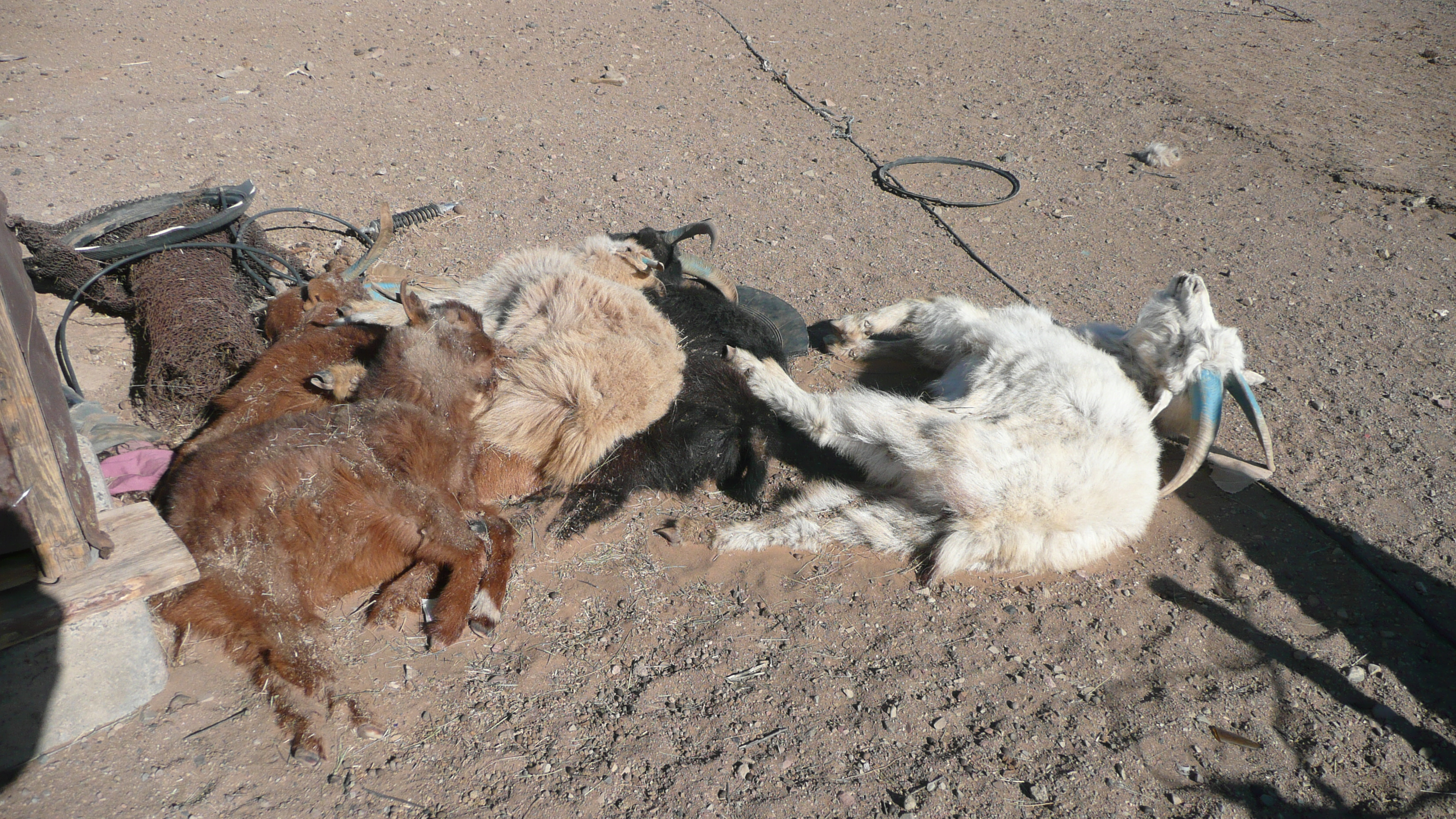
Goats that died as result of a "black" zud. Gobi Desert, March 2010.

A zud, dzud (Mongolian: зуд), dzhut, zhut, djut, or jut (Kazakh: жұт, Kyrgyz: жут, Russian: дзуд, джут) is a periodic disaster in steppe, semi-desert and desert regions in Mongolia and Central Asia (including Kazakhstan, Uzbekistan, Kyrgyzstan) in which large numbers of livestock die, primarily due to starvation, being unable to graze due to particular severe climatic conditions. Various kinds of zud are recognized, depending on the particular type of climatic conditions. In winter it may be caused by an impenetrable ice crust, and in summer it may happen due to drought.

One-third of Mongolia's population depends entirely on pastoral farming for its livelihood, which contributes to 80% of its agricultural output and 11% of the country's GDP. Harsh zuds can cause economic crises and food security issues in the country.

== Description ==
In Mongolia, the following types of zud are recognized:

- tsagaan (white) zud results from high snowfall that prevents livestock from reaching the grass. It is a frequent and serious disaster that has caused a great number of deaths.
- khar (black) zud results from a lack of snowfall in grazing areas, leading to both livestock and humans lacking water. This type of zud does not occur every year, nor does it affect large areas. It mostly happens in the Gobi Desert region.
- tumur (iron) zud results from a short wintertime warming, followed by a return to sub-freezing temperatures. The snow melts and then freezes again, producing an impenetrable ice-cover that prevents livestock from grazing.
- huiten (cold) zud occurs when the temperature drops to very low levels for several days. The cold temperature and the strong winds prevent livestock from grazing; the animals have to use most of their energy to keep warm.
- havsarsan (combined) zud is a combination of at least two of the above types of zud.
- tuuvaryin zud is when any of the above are geographically widespread, and may include complications such as overgrazing.

In Kazakhstan there is a proverb that "Djut has seven relatives" (жұт жеты агайынды). When interpreted, seven severe natural conditions are mentioned (not always the same), e.g., summer drought, grass drying out, early winter, deep snow, winter rains, ice crust, blizzard.

=== Man-made factors ===
Human factors worsen the situation caused by the harsh winters. Under the communist regime, the state regulated the size of the herds to prevent overgrazing. The 1990s saw a deregulation of Mongolia's economy and a simultaneous growth in worldwide demand for cashmere wool, which is made from goat hair. As a result, the number of goats in Mongolia has increased significantly. Unlike sheep, goats tend to damage the grass by nibbling at its roots; their sharp hooves also damage the upper layer of the pasture, which is subsequently swept away by the wind. This leads to desertification. Additionally, climate change has resulted in snowier winters and stronger droughts, both of which contribute to harsher and more frequent zuds.

== Mitigation ==
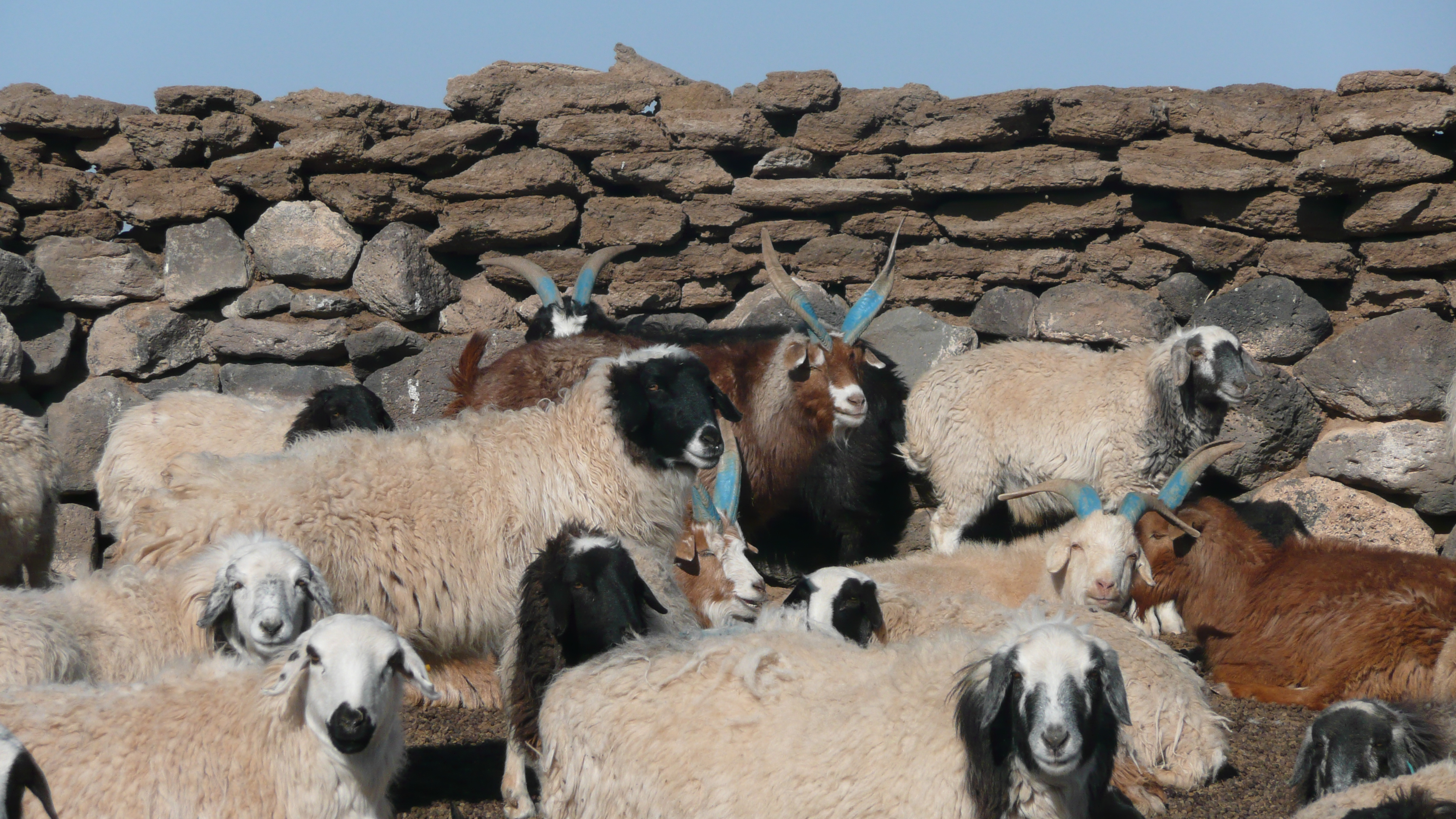
Kizyak shelter, South Gobi, 2010

Some traditional methods to protect the livestock from such inclement weather conditions include drying and storing cut grass during the summer months, and collecting sheep and goat dung to build dried flammable blocks called kizyak in Central Asia and argal (аргал түлш) in Mongolia. Dried grass can be fed to animals to prevent death from starvation when zud occurs. The kizyak, or blocks of sheep and goat dung, are stacked to make a wall that protects the animals from the wind chills, and keep them warm enough to withstand the harsh conditions. These blocks can also be burnt as fuel during the winter. These methods are still practiced today in the westernmost parts of Mongolia, and areas formerly part of the Zuun Gar nation.

Because of the semi-permanent structure of the winter shelter for their livestock and the cold, most – if not all – nomads engage in transhumance (seasonal migration). They have winter locations to spend the winter, which are in a valley protected by mountains on most sides from the wind, while in the summer they move to more open space.

== Extent and history ==
It is not uncommon for zuds to kill over one million head of livestock in a given winter. The 1944 record of almost seven million head of livestock lost was surpassed in the 21st century.

The arctic oscillation in both 1944–45 and in 2010 was pushed much deeper into Central Asia, bringing prolonged extreme cold weather. In 1999–2000, 2000–2001, and 2001–2002, Mongolia was hit by three zuds in a row, in which a combined number of 11 million animals were lost.

During the winter of 2009–2010, 80% of the country's territory was covered with a snow blanket of 200–600 mm (8–24 in). In the Uvs aimag, extreme cold (night temperature of −48 °C or −54 °F) remained for almost 50 days. 9,000 families lost their entire herds while a further 33,000 suffered 50% loss. The Ministry of Food, Agriculture and Light Industry reported 2,127,393 head of livestock were lost as of 9 February 2010 (188,270 horse, cattle, camel and 1,939,123 goat and sheep). The agriculture ministry predicted that livestock losses might reach four million before the end of winter; however, by May 2010, the United Nations reported that eight million, or about 17% of the country's entire livestock, had died.

In the winter of 2015–2016, extreme temperatures were again recorded and the previous summer's drought led to insufficient hay fodder reserves for many herders, which caused another ongoing loss of livestock.

The zud of winter 2023–2024 was particularly substantial with 2 million animals dead by late February, which had increased to 5 million by late March, and to a total of 7.1 million animals by early June, representing over 10% of the country's livestock population.

In response to the zud, the Mongolian government expanded its new cooperative program of subsidized loans to herders, doubling its budget to 1 trillion tugrik in September 2024. By September 2024, 495.3 billion tugrik had been allocated to 14,381 herders.

== Social consequences ==
Some herders who lose all of their animals to zud have to seek a new life in the cities. Mongolia's capital, Ulaanbaatar, is surrounded by clusters of wooden houses without roads, water or sewage systems. Lacking in education and skills to survive in an urban environment, many displaced herders cannot find work and become extremely poor, may become addicted to alcohol, and may commit crime. Others risk their lives in dangerous illegal mining jobs.
