= SouthGobi Resources =

Canadian coal mining company

SouthGobi Resources Ltd.
- Type: Public company
- Traded as: TSX-V: SGQ; SEHK: 1878
- Industry: Coal mining
- Founded: 2002 in Canada
- Products: Coking Coal
- Services: Coal mining
- Revenue: ▲US$73.084 million (2022)
- Operating income: ▲US$13.572 million (2022)
- Net income: ▼ -US$30.419 million (2022)
- Total assets: ▼US$181.359 million (2022)
- Total equity: ▼US$142.524 million (2022)
- Number of employees: 360 (2022)
- Subsidiaries: SGQ Coal Investment Pte. Ltd, SouthGobi Sands LLC, SouthGobi Resources (Hong Kong) Limited, SouthGobi Trading (Beijing) Co., Ltd., Inner Mongolia SouthGobi Energy Co., Ltd., Inner Mongolia SouthGobi Enterprise Co., Ltd., Inner Mongolia SouthGobi Mining Development Co., Ltd., Inner Mongolia SouthGobi Trading Co., Ltd., Wuhai SouthGobi Mining Resources Co., Ltd.
- Website: https://www.southgobi.com

SouthGobi Resources is a Canadian coal mining company listed on the Hong Kong Stock Exchange and Toronto Stock Exchange. The company's primary asset is a coal mine and development projects of coal assets in Mongolia.

A proposed acquisition of the company by a Chinese state owned mining firm in 2012 was thwarted by resource nationalism in Mongolia. The blocked deal led to a chain of events that negatively affected the Mongolian economy for the rest of the decade. Quickly in response to the announced deal, Mongolia passed an investment review law in Mongolia (shortly repealed after enactment) that while only briefly in force stunted for years foreign investor confidence in the country, which had been a darling in emerging markets investment circles before 2012.

After the blocked deal, SouthGobi would itself face an equally dramatic fall from grace as the Mongolian economy. By 2015, the company lost 98% of its once sky high $3 billion Canadian dollar market capitalization that had peaked in 2012.

== Corporate affairs ==
The company is publicly listed on the Stock Exchange of Hong Kong (HKEX: 1878) and Toronto Stock Exchange (TSX: SGQ). Its principal shareholders according to its 2018 annual report are the China Investment Corporation with 23.8%; Novel Sunrise with 17.0%, and Voyage Wisdom with 9.5%. Novel Sunrise is 100% controlled by China Cinda Asset Management. Both the China Investment Corporation and China Cinda Asset Management are central state owned enterprises of China.

== History ==
=== Early history ===
The company was founded in 2002. SouthGobi listed on the Toronto Stock Exchange in 2007 and Hong Kong Stock Exchange in 2010.

In 2009, the China Investment Corporation funded a $500 million convertible debenture issued by SouthGobi. In March 2010, $250 million of the convertible debenture was converted into SouthGobi common shares. This move lowered the interest held by Ivanhoe Mines (later renamed Turquoise Hill Resources) to 57.6%.

=== Blocked Chalco sale ===
By 2012, Ivanhoe Mines had come under the influence of its largest shareholder Rio Tinto, which wanted to sell non-core assets, which included SouthGobi. In the same year, Ivanhoe Mines attempted to sell its 57.6% of SouthGobi to Aluminum Corporation of China Limited (Chalco) for $889 million. The attempt announced in April 2012 failed. Chalco called off the deal in September 2012 after estimating "chances for obtaining approval from the Mongolian government were slim".

Negative public opinion in Mongolia based on resource nationalism opposed the sale. The masses did not want majority ownership by Chinese state-owned enterprises of companies in their mining industry. Harassment by the Mongolian government targeting SouthGobi and its personnel also took its toll. During and after the sale process, the Mongolian government jailed SouthGobi employees and suspended its mining license for several months. In October 2012, its chief legal counsel Sarah Armstrong was detained and prevented from leaving the country. The Mongolian government alleged the company management had bribed Mongolian state officials. The allegations resulted in the shutdown and search of SouthGobi headquarters in Mongolia by a Mongolian anti-corruption agency. In May 2013 Justin Capla, another company executive, was prosecuted and later sentenced to prison for five years. He was later pardoned by President Tsakhiagiin Elbegdorj in February 2015.

=== Fallout from Chalco sale failure ===
The aggressive actions of the Mongolian government against SouthGobi succeeded in blocking the deal with Chalco but had the effect of terrifying foreign investors, resulting in a large slump in investment to Mongolia that continued for several years after 2012.

SouthGobi would dramatically lose value after the blocked sale. The company had been valued at $3 billion Canadian dollars at its high point in 2012.

In March 2015, Novel Sunrise Investments, a private Chinese firm from the Novel Group of companies, became SouthGobi's largest shareholder. Furthermore, Novel Sunrise also appointed three members to SouthGobi's board. Novel Sunrise also separately bought shares in a different company called Turquoise Hill Resources, which also owned shares in SouthGobi.

In January 2020, SouthGobi LLC, a subsidiary of SouthGobi Resources, donated ₮80,000,000 to Manidbadar General Education School, a school in Noyon District, Ömnögovi Province.

In June 2021, SouthGobi's CEO was awarded the Mongolian Medal of Friendship, and the company's VP of Public Relations was also awarded the title of Honored Lawyer of Mongolia.

The company holds the Ovoot Tolgoi Mine and development projects at the Soumber Deposit and Zag Suuj Deposit.
