= List of foreign currency bonds =

Foreign currency bonds are bonds denominated in a currency that is foreign to the entity issuing the bonds.

== List of Foreign Currency Bonds ==
=== Western Nations ===
- United States of America
  - American Yankee bond, a U.S. dollar-denominated bond issued by a non-U.S. entity in the U.S. market.
  - Eurodollar bond, a U.S. dollar-denominated bond issued by a non-U.S. entity outside the U.S.
- Australia
  - Kangaroo bond, an Australian dollar-denominated bond issued by a non-Australian entity in the Australian market.
- Canada
  - Maple bond, a Canadian dollar-denominated bond issued by a non-Canadian entity in the Canadian market.
- United Kingdom
  - Bulldog bond, a pound sterling-denominated bond issued in London by a foreign institution or government.

=== BRICS Nations ===
- Russia
  - Matryoshka bond, a Russian rouble-denominated bond issued in the Russian Federation by non-Russian entities. The name derives from the famous Russian wooden dolls, Matrioshka, popular among foreign visitors to Russia.
- India
  - Masala bond, an Indian rupee-denominated bond issued outside India.
- China
  - Panda bond, a Chinese renminbi-denominated bond issued by a non-China entity in the People's Republic of China market.
  - Dim sum bond, a Chinese renminbi-denominated bond issued by a Chinese entity in Hong Kong. Enables foreign investors forbidden from investing in Chinese corporate debt in mainland China to invest in and be exposed to Chinese currency in Hong Kong.
  - Kungfu bond, an offshore U.S. dollar-denominated bond issued by Chinese financial institutions and corporations.
  - Pearl bond/Free Trade Zone bond, a Chinese renminbi-denominated bond issued by an entity in the Shanghai Free-Trade Zone offshore market.
  - Yulan bond, a bond issued by a Chinese entity denominated in currencies supported by Euroclear through Euroclear Bank and the Shanghai Clearing House.
- Indonesia
  - Komodo bonds, rupiah-denominated global bonds issued in Indonesia.

=== Non-BRICS Asian Nations ===
- Japan
  - Samurai bond, a Japanese yen-denominated bond issued by a non-Japanese entity in the Japanese market.
  - Uridashi bond, a non-yen-denominated bond sold to Japanese retail investors.
  - Shibosai Bond, a private placement bond in the Japanese market with distribution limited to institutions and banks.
  - Shogun bond, a non-yen-denominated bond issued in Japan by a non-Japanese institution or government.
- Korea
  - Arirang bond, a Korean won-denominated bond issued by a non-Korean entity in the Korean market.
  - Kimchi bond, a non-Korean won-denominated bond issued by a non-Korean entity in the Korean market.
- Taiwan
  - Formosa bond, a non-New Taiwan Dollar-denominated bond issued by a non-Taiwan entity in the Taiwan market.
- Singapore
  - Lion City bond, a foreign currency-denominated bond issued by a foreign company in Singapore.

=== Other Nations ===
- Huaso bond, a Chilean peso-denominated bond issued by a non-Chilean entity in the Chilean market.
- Baklava bond, a bond denominated in Turkish Lira and issued by a domestic or foreign entity in the Turkish market.
- Eurobond, a bond where the currency denomination differs from the currency of the country in which it is issued. The term is unrelated to the Euro currency.
- Dual currency bond, a bond where the currency for the coupon payments differs from the currency for the principal repayment.

== See also ==
- Bond (finance)
- Dedollarisation
- Economic sanctions
- Economic warfare
- SWIFT and its alternatives
