= HSBC Finance =

Subsidiary of HSBC Holdings

HSBC Finance Corporation
- Type: Subsidiary
- Industry: Finance and insurance
- Founded: 1878; 148 years ago
- Headquarters: Mettawa, Illinois, United States
- Key people: Niall Booker (chairman)
- Products: Financial services
- Number of employees: 58,000 (including HSBC Bank USA, HSBC Bank Canada and CIBM)
- Parent: HSBC
- Website: www.hsbc.com

HSBC Finance Corporation is a financial services company and a subsidiary of HSBC Holdings. It is the sixth-largest issuer of MasterCard and Visa credit cards in the United States. HSBC Finance Corporation was formed from the legal entity that had been known as Household International—shortly after Household International settled for US$486 million in charges pertaining to predatory lending, after burning through $389 million in legal fees and expenses—and is now expanding its consumer finance model via the HSBC Group to Brazil, India, Argentina and elsewhere.

HSBC Finance Corporation's subsidiaries primarily provide real estate secured loans, auto finance loans, MasterCard and Visa credit card loans, private label credit cards, personal non-credit card loans and specialty insurance products to middle-market consumers.

== History ==
=== Origins ===

Household Finance Corp. was founded in 1878 by Frank MacKey of Minneapolis, Minnesota. It claims that in 1895 it was the first financial company to offer the installment plan, under which a consumer loan could be repaid through a regular monthly amount rather than a lump sum on the due date. It was restructured in 1981 under a holding company named Household International Inc., and, in 1998, it acquired Beneficial Corporation.

Household International was a provider of consumer loans and credit cards in the United States, Canada and the United Kingdom. In October 2002, Household International settled for US$486 million charges of predatory lending by attorneys general in 46 U.S. states.

On November 14, 2002, HSBC announced the acquisition of Household International Inc for a total value of US$15.3 billion.

=== 2003 to 2010 ===
On March 28, 2003, HSBC acquired Household International, which was merged in 2005 with a subsidiary company that became the HSBC Finance Corp. Household International CEO William Aldinger became the highest-paid director in the United Kingdom before announcing his departure in February 2005. On March 2, 2009, HSBC chairman Stephen Green said that, in retrospect, HSBC should not have acquired Household International.

In August 2005, HSBC-N.A. announced plans to acquire Metris Companies, Inc, a credit card issuer to the U.S. middle market segment. The deal closed in early December 2005 and is an all-cash transaction worth close to US$2 billion. HSBC has inserted the Metris product line including the American DreamCard (under the Direct Merchants Bank brand) into the HSBC-NA credit card family of products.

In 2009, HSBC Finance Corporation announced the discontinuation of loan originations of all products by its Consumer Lending business, but continue to service and collect the existing receivable portfolio as it runs off, while continuing efforts to reach out and assist mortgage customers with their loan repayments and home preservation. The Consumer Lending branch offices, branded in the US as HFC and Beneficial, had ceased taking new loan applications as soon as practical and substantially all branch offices will be closed as soon as commitments to customers are satisfied.

=== 2010 to present ===
In 2010, HSBC Finance sold its auto loan units to Santander Consumer USA.

On August 10, 2011, Capital One Financial Corp announced that it will buy the U.S. credit card arm of Britain's HSBC for a premium of about US$2.6 billion as a way to expand its domestic credit card business. The acquisition includes the HSBC unit's approximately US$30 billion credit card portfolio.

The sale of the U.S. credit card division came a little more than a week after HSBC announced that it will sell almost half its retail branches in the United States. That included the sale of 195 branches in New York and Connecticut to First Niagara Financial Group. HSBC said the two actions are part of its plan to make HSBC a more internationally focused business, but reassured that the U.S. is still considered a key market in its strategy.

HSBC and Capital One said that they expect no immediate changes to the credit card programs and operations. HSBC customers will see no near-term service changes and should be able to use their credit cards normally.

In 2013, HSBC Finance sold its US consumer loans to Springleaf Financial and Newcastle Investment Corp.

In April 2015, HSBC Finance was reported as having accidentally uploaded information on United States customers' mortgages, including social security numbers and telephone numbers, to a publicly accessible webserver that was subsequently indexed by Google search. The data included information from a large number of HSBC Finance's subsidiary firms.

On 16 June 2016, HSBC Finance Corporation (HSBC Finance) has declared a settlement of a 14-year shareholder class case focused on incidents that happened until HSBC purchased Household International Inc. in 2003. Having recently revealed a possible liability of up to US$ 3.6 billion in regulatory reports, HSBC Finance has offered to compensate US$ 1.575 billion to resolve all charges in Jaffe v. Household International. The deal remains subject to ratification by the court which is estimated to result in a pre-tax bill of roughly US$ 585 m to HSBC Finance in the second quarter of 2016 covering attorney costs and expenditures.

== Enforcement and regulatory actions ==
Over the course of its history, HSBC Finance and its predecessor companies have been subject to various regulatory actions. For instance, it was alleged that Household Finance had placed borrowers in high-cost loans with costly prepayment penalties which had not been properly disclosed. To resolve this issue, Household agreed to pay $484 million in restitution and to change its lending practices.

== Operations ==
=== Canada ===
HSBC Finance Corporation has a Canadian operation which it inherited from Household International. Since the HSBC acquisition the Canadian subsidiary works more closely with HSBC Bank Canada. The unit offers mortgages, personal loans and insurance through 75 branches in 10 provinces and via merchant relationship with stores such as The Brick, Henry's, and Arctic Cat. HSBC Finance Canada ceased operations on March 21, 2012. 75 branches were closed immediately and approximately 500 staff members were laid off.

=== United Kingdom ===
In the United Kingdom, HFC Bank is a sub-prime consumer lender. Its branch network originally consisted of around 125 Beneficial Finance branches. Since Household International's acquisition by HSBC, HFC Bank has worked increasingly closely with HSBC Bank plc particularly for cross-selling purposes.

HFC also provides retail finance for stores such as John Lewis, Currys & PC World. In October 2007, the Marbles & Beneficial branded credit card portfolios were sold to SAV Credit. In January 2008, the Financial Services Authority fined HFC £1,085,000, for failing to take reasonable care in its sale of Payment Protection Insurance.

In June 2009, HSBC announced that 100 branches would be closed, including all six in Scotland, with all branches closing the following month. The remaining branches would be closed to new business, and eventually close altogether. The company website is now offline, it previously stated; our branches have been closed since July 2009.

=== United States ===
==== Beneficial and HFC ====
HFC logo

Beneficial logo

Operating under the HFC and Beneficial names, HSBC Finance Corporation was the second largest consumer finance company in the United States, with more than 900 branches in 46 states. It provided a variety of real estate secured and unsecured loans to primarily sub-prime customers, as well as increasing numbers of other product lines such as auto loans and service plan policies. On 2 March 2009, it was announced that HSBC would no longer accept new business from HFC/Beneficial, and would eliminate 6,100 jobs. The company website now states that the Beneficial and HFC companies and HSBC Credit Centers have closed their consumer finance businesses in the United States, the website is no longer active, and that all loans have been sold with servicing transferred to third-party servicers.

Children of former full-time Beneficial employees are considered for scholarships to four Maryland institutions of higher learning: Hood College, Johns Hopkins University, St. John's College and Washington College.

==== Decision One ====
Decision One mortgage company directly originated real estate secured loans sourced through mortgage brokers. This subsidiary was shut down September 2007 due to the sub-prime mortgage meltdown. Approximately 1,500 employees were affected.

==== HSBC Bank Nevada NA ====
HSBC Bank Nevada issues a range of HSBC-branded credit cards, to both credit card only customers and customers of HSBC Bank USA.

==== Private label cards ====
HSBC was the third-largest issuer of private label credit cards in the United States, including cards for more than 70 active merchant relationships, including Best Buy, GM, Yamaha, Kawasaki, Neiman Marcus, Polaris and Saks Fifth Avenue. Most of its card portfolio was sold to Capital One in 2011.

=== Other ===
The techniques and experience of HSBC Finance Corporation are being increasingly exported to other HSBC markets, for example, the establishment of Proa by HSBC Bank Argentina, and new business being established in Poland by HSBC Bank Polska.

== Bibliography ==
- HSBC North America Holdings Inc. factsheet

== See also ==
- HSBC Group
- HSBC Bank USA
- HSBC Bank UK
- HSBC Bank Canada
- HSBC Bank Argentina
- Proa
