= Sustainable finance =

Finance with an environmental objective

Sustainable finance is the set of practices, standards, norms, regulations and products that pursue financial objectives while taking into account environmental, social, and governance considerations. It is often used interchangeably with Environmental, Social & Governance (ESG) investing. It is important to distinguish between ESG integration for better risk-adjusted returns and the broader field of sustainable finance that also includes impact investing, social finance and ethical investing.

A key idea is that sustainable finance allows the financial system to connect with the economy and its populations by seeking a growth objective. The long-standing concept was promoted with the adoption of the Paris Climate Agreement, which stipulates that parties must make "finance flows consistent with a pathway towards low greenhouse gas emissions and climate-resilient development." In addition, sustainable finance has a key role to play in the European Green Deal and in other EU International agreements, and its popularity continues to grow in financial markets.

In 2015, the United Nations adopted the 2030 Agenda to steer the transition towards a sustainable and inclusive economy. This commitment involves 193 member states and comprises 17 goals and 169 targets. The UN's Sustainable Development Goals aim to tackle current global challenges, including protecting the planet. Sustainable finance has become a key cornerstone for the achievement of these goals.

Various government programs and incentives support green and sustainable initiatives. For instance, the U.S. Environmental Protection Agency (EPA) provides grants and low-interest loans through its Clean Water State Revolving Fund for projects that improve water quality or address water infrastructure needs. The Small Business Administration (SBA) also offers loans and grants for green businesses.

== Terminology ==
Specific terminology is used to clarify concepts and ideas utilized in discussions about sustainable finance. The United Nations Environment Programme (UNEP) defines three concepts that are different but often used as synonyms, namely: climate, green, and sustainable finance. Climate finance is a subset of environmental finance, and mainly refers to funds which address climate change adaptation and resilience, climate mitigation, and a just transition. Green finance has a broader scope, covering the same ground as climate finance but also covers other environmental issues such as biodiversity protection. Sustainable finance includes the same scope as green finance, but adds environmental, social and governance (ESG) domains in its scope. It is therefore the broadest term, covering all financing activities that contribute to sustainable development.

The terminology of sustainable finance has evolved over time alongside policy frameworks and market practices. A review study in 2026 demonstrated that early research primarily used fragmented concepts such as ethical finance, socially responsible investment, and environmental finance, before the gradual consolidation of the field around ESG-based sustainable finance. Their periodization clarifies the differences and similarities between the rival terms (carbon finance, climate finance, environmental finance, green finance and sustainable finance). The authors distinguish three main periods: The first period ("forerunners") spans from the 1970s to 2010.

During this time, the theoretical foundations were established, and following the publication of the Brundtland Report (1987), the first green financial instruments and the first targeted research emerged. The establishment of the Green Climate Fund (2010) was followed by the second period ("early phase") spanning 2010-2021 and includes eras of carbon, environmental, and climate finance. Collectively, this constitutes the era of early sustainable finance research, which lasted until 2021, the year of COP26. This is followed by the third ("mature phase") which spans 2021–present, and is characterized by green and sustainable finance.

== Tools and standards ==
=== Green bonds ===
Green bonds are any type of bond instrument where the proceeds or an equivalent amount is exclusively applied to finance or re-finance, in part or in full, new and/or existing Green Projects. In other words, they are loans issued in the market by a public or private organization to finance environmentally friendly activities. Their growth is consistent; GSS+ (Green, Social and Sustainability bonds and Sustainability-linked bonds) reached a volume of $170 billion in 2018 and $653.5 billion in 2025.

The aim of this type of bond (finance) is to encourage the financing of green projects by attracting more capital to support sustainable development. According to empirical studies, the high demand for this type of bond provides it with a lower yield than its standard equivalent. Scientists recommend including this climate factor in the risk assessment of bonds. The aim is, on the one hand, to increase the borrowing cost of brown bonds which can fund carbon-intensive projects and de-incentivise their investment by increasing the weight of climate risk. On the other hand, the goal is to reduce the weight of risk of green bonds in order to stimulate investment and potentially encourage banks to reduce the interest rate of these bonds.

From a legal point of view, green bonds are not really different from traditional bonds. The promises made to investors are not always included in the contract, and not often in a binding way. Issuers of green bonds usually follow standards and principles set by private-led organisations such as the International Capital Market Association (ICMA)'s Green Bond Principles or the label of the Climate bond initiative. The Paris agreement on climate change highlighted a desire to standardize reporting practices related to green bonds, in order to avoid greenwashing. To date, there are no regulations requiring the borrower to specify its "green" intentions in writing, however, the EU is currently developing a green bond standard which will force issuers to fund activities aligned with the EU taxonomy for sustainable activities. This standard is expected to be a voluntary standard, operating alongside other voluntary standards, with academics and practitioners raising the policymakers' awareness to the dangers of imposing it as a mandatory standard.

The European Union has already created its own "Next Generation EU Green bonds framework" to use green bonds to raise part of the funds for the Next Generation EU project. This project promises an investment of 750 billion euros in grants and loans (at 2018 prices), by the European Commission, aiming to revive the post-COVID-19 economy in the 27 EU member states. Up to 30% of the budget will be raised by issuing green bonds, which results in up to 250 million, and a total of 14.5 million had already been raised by January 2022. This will make the European Commission the largest issuer of green bonds. On 21 December 2024, the European Union Green Bonds Regulation comes into force, allowing the issue of "European Green Bond" (or "EuGB") by companies, regional or local authorities and EEA supra-nationals.

Empirical studies show that the risk of greenwashing is present and may wrongly induce investors to accept lower rates of return than for brown investments. Indeed, theoretical research grounded in Bayesian game theory demonstrates that greenwashing is rational behaviour for value-maximising investors given the insufficiency of a credible regime regulating the use of green labels. The standardization of this taxonomy would reduce the criticism of greenwashing that can be attributed to this type of obligation and enhance clarity and transparency in their use. Rating agencies should focus more on this type of risk in order to identify and quantify it better.

=== Taxonomy of sustainable activities ===
Because energy transition is a broad concept and sustainability or green can apply to many projects (renewable energy, energy efficiency, waste management, water management, public transportation, reforestation...), several taxonomies are being established to evaluate and certify "green" investments (having no or very little impact on the environment).

In 2018, the European Commission created a working group of technical experts on sustainable finance (TEG: Technical Expert Group) to define a classification of economic activities (the "taxonomy"), in order to have a robust methodology defining whether an activity or company is sustainable or not. The aim of the taxonomy is to prevent greenwashing and to help investors make greener choices. Investments are judged by six objectives: climate change mitigation, climate change adaptation, the circular economy, pollution, effect on water, and biodiversity.

The taxonomy came into force in July 2020. The taxonomy is seen as a comprehensive and sophisticated initiative of its type and it may assist other countries to develop their own taxonomies. However, when the disclosure regime came into effect in January 2022 there were still gaps in data and it may be several years before it becomes effective.

The classifications of fossil gas and nuclear energy are controversial. The European Commission asked its Joint Research Centre to assess the environmental sustainability of nuclear. The results will be investigated for three months by two expert groups before the commission makes a decision on the classification. Natural gas is seen by some countries as the bridge between coal and renewable energy, and those countries argue for natural gas to be considered sustainable under a set of conditions. In response, various members of the expert group that advises the European Commission threatened to step down. They stated they see the inclusion of gas as a contradiction to climate science, as methane emissions from the natural gas form are a significant greenhouse gas.

The UK is working on its own separate taxonomy.

=== Green-supporting factor on capital requirements ===
To encourage banks to increase green lending, commercial banks have been proposing to introduce a "Green-supporting factor" on banks' capital requirements. This proposal is currently being considered by the European Commission and the European Banking Authority. However this approach is generally being opposed by central bankers and nonprofits organisations, which propose instead the adoption of higher capital requirements for assets linked with fossil fuels ("Brown-penalizing factor").

=== Mandatory and voluntary disclosure ===
In addition, another tool and some standards lie in reporting and transparency. In 2015, the Financial Stability Board (FSB) launched the Taskforce on Climate-related Financial Disclosures (TCFD) which is led by Michael Bloomberg. The TCFD's recommendations aim to encourage companies to better disclose the climate-related risks in their business, as well as their internal governance enabling the management of these risks. In the United Kingdom, the governor of the Bank of England, Mark Carney, has actively supported the TCFD's recommendations and has called on several occasions for the implementation of obligations for companies in the financial sector to be transparent and to take into account financial risks in their management, notably through climate stress tests.

In France, the 2015 Energy Transition Law requires institutional investors to be transparent about their integration of Environmental, Social and Governance Criteria into their investment strategy.

Nevertheless, empirical research has shown the limited effect of disclosure policies if they remain voluntary.

In addition, in October 2022, the Corporate Sustainability Reporting Directive was adopted. This new reporting rule will apply to all large firms, whether listed on stock markets or not. Therefore, around 50,000 companies will be covered by new rules, compared to about 11,700 with the former set of rules. More precisely, the impact of an organization on the environment, human rights and social standards will be introduced in this CSRD. Indeed, this reporting directive asks for more detailed reporting requirements thanks to common criteria, in line with the EU's climate goals. The commission will adopt the first set of standards by June 2023 after that, the aim of the commission is to enlarge more and more companies to this set of standards. Indeed, from 1 January 2026, the rules will apply to listed SMEs and other undertakings, with reports due in 2027. However, SMEs can opt out until 2028. Thanks to this new set of rules, the EU has become a front-runner in global sustainability reporting standards.

== Green monetary policy ==
Policymakers, through their green monetary policies, help speed up the adoption of sustainable finance by supporting the development of investment instruments and fund structures tailored specifically to sustainable finance, creating incentives for investors, and establishing a regulatory agenda to standardize ESG measures of performance. According to the EDHEC 2019 survey, European investors wanted more ETF products in the areas of socially responsible investing, and for strategies using factor indices. By late 2024, ESG ETFs reached over $640 billion in assets.

=== Green Central Banking ===
The term "Green Central Banking" refers to the critical role that central banks must play in achieving zero-net-emissions targets and mitigating climate change. By adjusting their monetary policies into “green monetary policy” and capital requirements, central banks can redirect investment into green financing.

=== Network for Greening the Financial System (NGFS) ===
In 2018, under the leadership of Mark Carney, Frank Elderson, and Banque de France Governor Villeroy de Galhau, eight central banks created the Network for Greening the Financial System (NGFS), a network of central banks and financial supervisors wanting to explore the potential role of central banks to accompany the energy transition. This network has nearly 116 central banks and supervisors and 19 observers including the International Monetary Fund (IMF) and the European Central Bank (ECB). Priorities for the NGFS include sharing best practices, advancing climate and environmental risk management in the financial sector, and mobilizing mainstream finance.

Several policy options for greening monetary policy instruments have been explored by the NGFS:

- Green refinancing operations: central banks can adopt green conditions when banks refinance themselves from central banks, for example by granting a lower interest rate if banks issue a certain volume of loans for green projects.
- Green collateral frameworks: central banks can restrict collateral eligibility rules by excluding polluting assets, or requiring banks to mobilize a pool of assets that is aligned with net zero trajectories.
- Green quantitative easing: central banks could restrict their asset purchases programmes to green bonds.

The NGFS, through its working group “Workstream 2”, has published new Scenarios for central banks and supervisors in September 2022 in partnership with an academic consortium. The NGFS Scenarios were developed to assess the impact of climate change on the global economy and financial markets. While developed primarily for use by central banks and supervisors, they may be valuable to the broader business sector, government, and academics as well.

=== European Central Bank's financial commitment to addressing climate change ===
During the United Nations Climate Change Conference (COP 26), in July 2021, under the leadership of Christine Lagarde and after pressure from NGOs, the ECB committed to contributing to the implementation of the Paris Agreement's aim of “making finance flows consistent with a pathway towards low greenhouse gas emissions and climate-resilient development”. (Article 2.1. (c) of the Paris Agreement, 2015) The ECB also announced a detailed roadmap to incorporate climate change in its monetary policy framework. The action plan includes measures to integrate climate-risks metrics in the ECB's collateral framework and corporate sector purchase programme (CSPP) referred to bonds. Christine Lagarde said she was also in favour of developing "green lending facilities" like the Bank of Japan and People's Bank of China.

=== Action plan of the ECB on climate change ===
In accordance with its recent decisions, the ECB commits to contributing to the Paris Agreement goals and NGFS initiatives within its mandate by taking the following specific actions:

1. Integrating climate-related risks into financial stability monitoring and prudential supervision of bank
2. Integrating sustainability factors into own portfolio management
3. Exploring the effects of climate-related risks on the Eurosystem monetary policy framework within our mandate
4. Bridging data gaps in climate-related data
5. Working towards higher awareness and intellectual capacity, also through technical assistance and knowledge sharing

== Debate ==
There are a few concerns and limitations that can be attributed to sustainable finance.

=== The important number of standards ===
First, as already mentioned, the concept of sustainable finance is directly linked with ESG. However, there are still no universally adopted standards for how companies and organisations can measure and report on their sustainability performance. Instead, there are a large number of NGOs working independently to develop standards for sustainability reporting, alongside new regulations in many markets, which has historically created complexity and confusion for companies and investors. Indeed, the initiators of reforms in sustainable finance can be very different. There are initiatives from non-governmental organisations such as Global Reporting Initiative (GRI), IFRS Foundation, the International Integrated Reporting Council (IIRC) and the Carbon Disclosure Project. However, recently, it seems like the IFRS Foundation is taking the lead in global standards for stock exchanges. This is possible because the organisation possess a deep expertise in the standard-setting process, it also has legitimacy in the corporate and investor community, and regulators support it internationally.

Since sustainable finance is rather new and a constantly evolving topic with many different participants with varying needs, frameworks will likely continue to evolve over time. For example, a new framework for sustainable finance, ISO 32210 was published in October 2022. This tool provides guidance to all organisations, active in the financial sector, including, but not limited to, direct lenders and investors, asset managers and service providers, on the implementation of sustainability principles, practices and terminology for financing activities.

Because of this pool of standards and the constant evolution, it is not unusual to find that some funds or companies are not as green as they claim to be. Indeed, some ESG funds still hold shares in oil and coal companies, which might surprise some investors. However, since there are no universally adopted standards, this practice is still ongoing.

Businesses can also leverage the opacity and the diversity of ESG ratings methodologies thus questioning the reliability of ratings, greenwashing threats, and the relaying of inaccurate and piecemeal information to investors through self-reporting. This is considered as morally hazardous as depends on self-reported data based on the free will of companies to disclose information more than often unaudited and incomplete.

For instance, according to ESMA's consultancy, of the 34 respondents disclosing the number of ESG rating agencies they rely on, 77% use more than one provider for ESG ratings, while 23% use only one provider.

If the incentives to greenwash are quite high, it is partly correlated to the fact that rated ESG firms enjoy lower capital and debt costs for doing so. This problem is said to be mainly a question of the company's maturity on Corporate and Societal Responsibility and where it is situated on the CSR pyramid that distinguishes four distinct levels of responsibilities: economic, legal, ethical, and lastly philanthropic.

Lastly, it is important to mention that much focus has been on the European Union, at an international level, the lack of homogeneity on sustainable finance norms and standards is even larger. However, initiatives such as the International Platform on Sustainable Finance open the discussion and the exchange of best practices to have more international norms and standards.

=== A legislative spaghetti bowl ===
The global regulatory framework evolves in a global context of shift toward sustainable finance regulations. Currently, 29 countries in the world have in significant level of mandatory ESG disclosure regulation. Investors and financiers often favor companies with strong ESG records, which in turn can influence their ability to engage in international trade. Those who do are confronted to the multiplicity and divergence of regulatory frameworks around the world with specific market access prerequisites, disclosure standards, compliance supervision, authorities, etc.

Thus, the ESG market is often referred to as a “mess”, comparable to the “spaghetti bowl” effect regarding the profusion of global trade agreements. As global supply chains expand, it is harder to find a common guideline on ESG factoring and face the subsequent “red tape” and costs, especially for SMEs.

The greenhouse gas emissions reporting requirements can cause general problems such as inefficiencies and lack of transparency from confusion of overlapping reporting and ambiguity of common terms which can be mitigated through advanced streamlining processes.

=== Lack of comparability ===
In addition, the same actors also face a lack of comparability. Indeed, it is very difficult to compare companies and investments on the basis of their ESG performance. Taking again the example of the oil and gas industry, the reporting on sustainability is carried in varied ways. Indeed, according to a study conducted by researchers at the University of Perugia's Economics Department, out of 51 relevant GRI indicators, only four indicators appear in over 75% of the companies' GRI reports.

Also, a paper finds that only 60% of ESG ratings concord, compared to 99% for credit ratings from the largest rating agencies. The explanation of these discrepancies of methodologies according to the authors is the challenge of aggregating scores on three pillars, mainly the more complex social aspect. This phenomenon can be referred to as the “ESG ratings gap” in the academic literature and highlights how ratings provided by ESG providers often vary significantly, leading to what is referred to as "aggregate confusion".

Another problem concerning methodologies is that there are no set-in stone and can evolve with time, making comparison attempts null and void. For instance, MSCI has a rating system that is based on a scale of AAA (top of the line) to CCC (bottom of line), accompanied with a report explaining why a company went up or down in its score overtime. It was noted that of 150 companies on MSCI's repertoire, 50% had a score going up while changing nothing. The ESG rater later explained that they upgraded those companies because they updated their methodologies thus the scores went up. This way, most companies had upgraded for what MSCI calls “corporate behavior and data protection”, while only one company was upgraded for emission reduction. It was argued that MSCI worked in the interest of big S&P 500 corporations to get a higher score of ESG rating to help them lower their cost of capital and attract more investors.

This kind of post hoc adjustments were meticulously observed and linked to the question of data manipulation with intent to make the data more atractive. These inconsistencies make the ESG rating landscape less coherent and limit investors' ability to conduct through investment analysis..

=== Green Central Banking legitimacy ===
Another concern worth debating in sustainable finance is the legitimacy of Green Central Banking.

First, in response to the COVID-19 recession, which resulted from the COVID-19 pandemic, there was a strong reliance on central banks to intervene not only for their traditional prudential motives of ensuring price and financial stability but also for more promotional purposes as a means of supporting other policy objectives such as promoting a low-carbon economy (Baer et al. 2021). However, according to many researchers, the pursuit of such promotional goals in monetary policy decisions raises serious questions about the legitimacy of independent central banks (Fontan et al. 2016). By way of illustration, Greenpeace protestors claimed in March 2021 that the European Central Bank's (ECB) monetary policies subsidise fossil fuel companies (Treeck, 2021).

Furthermore, the Central Bank Independence (CBI) framework says that central banks should be permitted to operate independently within a limited mandate (Dietsch et al., 2018), although other writers feel that changing the central bank's mandate is insufficient (Fontan et al. 2022).

Central banks are rarely tasked with advancing environmental or climate change mitigation objectives. When it comes to these environmental policies, central banks must deal with arbitrary issues, and there is no agreement on who should bear the burden. Neither conservative nor progressive central bankers defend this dilemma (Fontan et al. 2022). As a result, according to the previous authors, their pursuit of green monetary policies puts central banks in a tough spot, casting doubt on their legitimacy.

In a nutshell, Baer and co-authors argue that central banks may their legitimacy issues by working in tandem with elected officials. In other words, a thorough examination of the actions of central banks necessitates a close examination of the actions of the governments and parliaments that formulate the central bank's mandate (Elgie 2002). Whether it's through working with a green investment bank to reduce their carbon footprint or forming joint committees of central bankers and members of parliament to influence the types of assets they purchase (Fontan et al. 2022).

== Initiatives ==
By signing the Paris Agreement, more than 190 countries have committed to fighting climate change and reducing environmental degradation. To reach the target of a maximum temperature increase of 2 °C, we need billions of green investments each year in key sectors of the global economy. Public finance will continue to play a key role, but a significant share of the funding will have to come from the private sector. Because financial markets are global, they offer a great opportunity, but this potential is largely untapped. Indeed, to mobilize international investors, it is necessary to promote integrated markets for environmentally sustainable finance at the global level.The UNFCCC and Paris Agreement's collective goal of mobilizing US$100 billion per year by 2020 in the context of meaningful mitigation action and transparency on implementation fell short in 2018. Therefore, this requires a high degree of coherence between the different capital market frameworks and tools that are essential for investors to identify and seize green investment opportunities. This means working together to ensure the potential of financial markets, and it is in this context that the International Platform on Sustainable Finance has been created.

=== International Platform on Sustainable Finance (IPSF) ===
The International Platform on Sustainable Finance (IPSF) was launched on 18 October 2019 by the European Union. The platform is a multi-stakeholder forum for dialogue between policymakers tasked with developing regulatory measures for sustainable finance to help investors identify and seize sustainable investment opportunities that truly contribute to climate and environmental goals.

The founding members of the IPSF are obviously the European Union, but also the competent authorities of Argentina, Canada, Chile, China, India, Kenya and Morocco. However, since its foundation, the Hong Kong Special Administrative Region of the People's Republic of China (HKSAR), Indonesia, Japan, Malaysia, New Zealand, Norway, Senegal, Singapore, Switzerland and the United Kingdom have also joined IPSF. Together, the 18 IPSF members represent 50% of the world's greenhouse gas emissions, 50% of the world's population and 45% of the world's GDP.

=== Sustainable finance in China ===
==== Green Bond Market in China ====
A pivotal moment in China's sustainable finance journey was the emergence of green bonds. In 2015, the People's Bank of China and the National Development and Reform Commission issued guidelines for green bond issuance. These guidelines established the framework for certifying and regulating green bonds, ushering in a new era of green investment in the country. The guidelines looked to help classify projects and set eligibility criteria within six environmental sectors. By the end of 2022 China had a cumulative labelled green bond volume of US$489bn (RMB 3.3tn). In June 2020, the People's Bank of China (PBoC), China's central bank, China Securities and Regulatory Commission (CSRC), and National Development and Reform Commission released a Green Bond Endorsed Project Catalogue draft which looked to build an overarching guideline for green bonds in China. China has since become the world's largest issuer of green bonds, with both domestic and international issuers seeking to fund environmentally friendly projects. Notable examples of issuers include the Industrial and Commercial Bank of China (ICBC), which among the 40 green Kung Fu bond issuers ranked the largest with at about 6.75bn USD.

==== Promotion of green finance policies in China ====
China's commitment to sustainable finance is reinforced by its strategic policy decisions. In 2016, the People's Bank of China launched a green finance pilot program in five provinces, followed by the Green Credit Issuance Guidelines, encouraging financial institutions to support green projects and integrate ESG criteria into their lending practices. In June 2022, China's National Development and Reform Commission released its 14th 5-year plan on renewable energy development (2021–2025), to accelerate renewable energy expansion. The plan looks to increase renewable energy generation by 50% and looks for a target of 3.3 trillion kWh as compared to 2020's 2.2 trillion kWh and hopes to reduce emissions by 2.6 gigatons annually. China's National Energy Administration has also furthered this goal by introducing policies supporting renewable energy development, facilitating investments in wind, solar, and hydroelectric power.

China's National Energy Administration is committed to supporting renewable energy development through a variety of policies, including feed-in tariffs, renewable portfolio standards, investment subsidies, and grid access. These policies have helped to make China the world leader in renewable energy development, and are attracting significant investment in renewable energy projects. The China Development Bank issued green bonds worth 10 billion yuan to improve the environmental protection efforts of the Yellow River and advance social development of regions. These efforts reflect China's aim to align its financial system with green development goals and transition toward a low-carbon economy.

=== Sustainable finance in Hong Kong ===
Hong Kong's financial secretary, Paul Chan, delivered the 2023–24 budget on 22 February 2023 with the promotion of a green economy, sustainable development and China's “3060 Dual Carbon Targets” at the forefront.

=== Sustainable finance in The European Union ===
==== European Green Deal ====
The European Green Deal is a proposal by the European Commission, approved in 2020, to put in place a series of policies to make Europe climate neutral by 2050 and to cut at least half of its CO_{2} emissions by 2030. Within it, the commission has promised to raise no less than €1 trillion in order to achieve the objectives of the European Green Deal by making sustainable investments. Part of this money has been raised to finance the Next Generation EU. Sustainable finance is therefore one of the pillars on which the EU Green Deal focuses and in addition to its own investments.

A major milestone in the EU's agenda for sustainable finance was the adoption of the EU taxonomy regulation.

==== Next Generation EU ====
More recently, the European Commission, on behalf of its 27 member states, is also making greater use of green finance, especially green bond (see green bonds section) to finance part of NextGenerationEU. The aim of this initiative is to relaunch the economy following COVID-19 pandemic and aims to improve the European Union on several levels including; making it greener, accelerating its digitalisation, improving the health system and preparing it for future challenges or supporting young people and making Europe more inclusive.

The main project under this initiative is the Recovery and Resilience Facility (RRF) which provides grants and loan funding to EU member states to support reform and investment. In order to access these funds, each EU Member State must propose a plan which must be approved by the European Commission and then by the Council. One of the most important criteria of this plan is that at least 37% is dedicated to the green aspect and 20% to digitalisation. Disbursement is gradual, with 13% received after the contract is signed, and the remainder on the basis of a bi-annual evaluation based on a report submitted and a payment request.

=== Sustainable Finance Initiatives in Mongolia ===
Mongolia was among the first countries to establish a national sustainable finance taxonomy and adopted its national green finance taxonomy in 2018. In 2023, the country adopted SDG Finance Taxonomy. Local commercial banks have played a significant role in promoting sustainable finance through the Mongolian Sustainable Finance Association (TOC), which was founded under the Mongolian Bankers Association in 2013 and later became an independent non-governmental organization in 2017.

Under the TOC leadership, a number of policy frameworks and technical guidelines have been developed. These include the Mongolian Sustainable Finance Principles, E&S Risk Assessment Sector Guidelines for the agriculture, mining, construction, manufacturing, and textile industries, E&S risk assessment tools and policy templates, and Green Finance Criteria for the textile and cashmere sectors. As a result of private sector-led awareness and capacity-building efforts, 2-3 local financial institutions have achieved accreditation with the Green Climate Fund.

The institutional framework for sustainable finance was strengthened in 2021 with the establishment of the Sustainable Development and Green Finance Policy Unit within the Bank of Mongolia. The unit was created to support the development and implementation of policies related to sustainable and green finance in the banking sector of Mongolia.

In 2025, Mongolian financial institutions raised approximately US$2.6 billion from international sources. According to one estimate, 72 percent of these funds were allocated to inclusive and sustainable lending for small and medium-sized enterprises (SMEs) and to environmentally focused projects.

== Research and academic education ==
Over the past two decades, sustainable finance has developed from a niche academic topic into a recognized field of research and education. As financial markets increasingly incorporate environmental, social and governance (ESG) considerations, universities and research institutes have expanded their work on the subject, often in collaboration with regulators, central banks, and international organizations.

=== Research ===
Research in sustainable finance spans several disciplines, including economics, finance, law, environmental studies, and data science.

Prominent areas include:

- ESG integration in investment and risk management – how ESG factors affect asset pricing, portfolio performance, systemic risk, and corporate valuation.
- Climate finance and transition risk – the financial implications of climate change, including carbon pricing, stranded assets, and the role of instruments such as green bonds.
- Impact measurement and accountability – methods to assess social and environmental outcomes of financial decisions; sustainability taxonomies; and debates on greenwashing.
- Policy and regulation – evaluation of frameworks such as the EU Sustainable Finance Disclosure Regulation (SFDR) and sustainability disclosure standards issued by the International Sustainability Standards Board (ISSB; IFRS S1 and IFRS S2).

=== Education ===
Sustainable finance has become an established part of higher education in business and economics. Many universities worldwide offer undergraduate and postgraduate courses, MBA electives, and executive programs on topics such as ESG investing, climate risk, and responsible banking.

== See also ==
- Eco-investing
- Environmental, Social and Governance (ESG)
