= Galicia Más =

Argentine financial services company

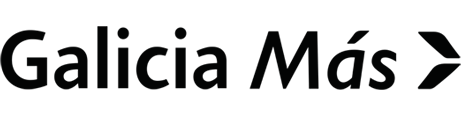

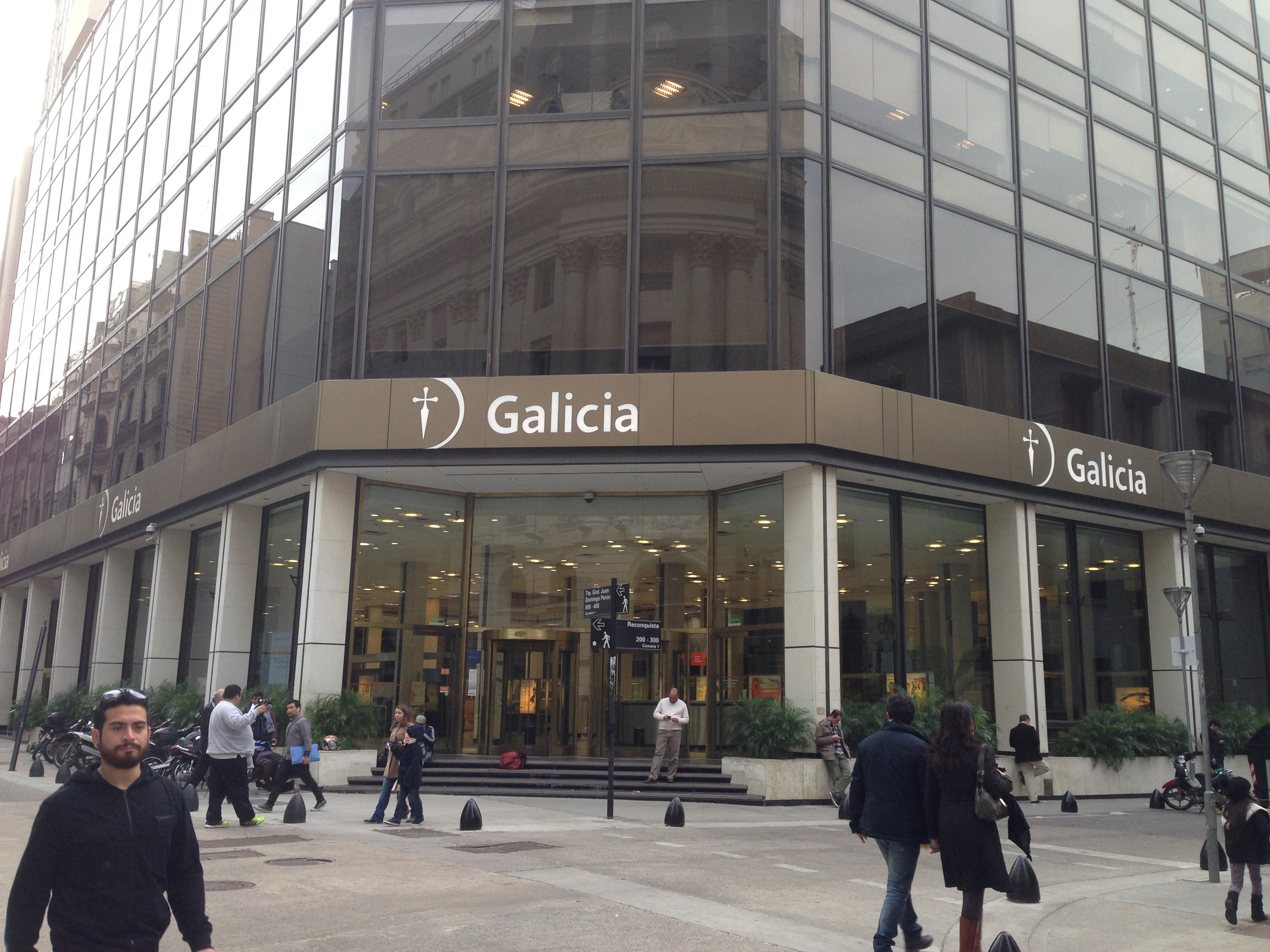
- A branch of Banco Galicia
- Formerly: HSBC Bank Argentina (1992–‍2024)
- Company type: Private company
- Traded as: BCBA: GGAL
- Industry: Financial services
- Founded: December 7, 2024
- Defunct: June 23, 2025
- Fate: Merged with Banco Galicia
- Successor: Banco Galicia
- Headquarters: Buenos Aires, Argentina
- Key people: Sergio Grinenco (Chairman); Guillermo Juan Pando (Vice-chairman); Bruno Folino (General manager)
- Products: Banking services, insurance, and pension funds
- Owner: HSBC Latin America Holdings (1992 - 2024); Galicia Financial Group (2025)
- Website: www.galiciamas.com.ar at the Wayback Machine (archived June 19, 2025)

Banco GGAL operating commercially as Galicia Más was an Argentine commercial and financial services bank that was formed after the acquisition of HSBC Bank Argentina by Grupo Financiero Galicia. It was the eleventh largest bank in Argentina, the entity had 100 branches, seven hundred thousand clients and more than 3,000 employees.

== History ==
On April 9, 2024, Grupo Financiero Galicia acquired HSBC's Argentine subsidiary for $550 million. On September 13, 2024, the Central Bank approved the sale of HSBC Bank Argentina to Grupo Financiero Galicia.

On December 6, 2024, HSBC Argentina disconnected from the HSBC Group's global network and rebranded as Galicia Más, officially ceasing to exist in Argentina after 32 years of uninterrupted operations in the country. The rebranding of HSBC to Galicia Más took place at midnight on December 6, 2024. With this rebranding, a chapter in the history of HSBC in Argentina was closed. HSBC has left a significant mark on the Argentine financial system for more than three decades.

Given the confusion that arose from the outset, the bank attempted to clarify by all means that Galicia Más and Galicia operated as two different banks, with their own brands, branches, benefits, digital and customer service channels, products, and services.

According to data from the Central Bank of Argentina, as of December 2024, the bank had 1,355,778 open regular savings accounts, 17,950 savings accounts for social assistance, 1,127,591 credit cards, and 969,993 debit cards issued.

=== Closure and merger with Banco Galicia ===
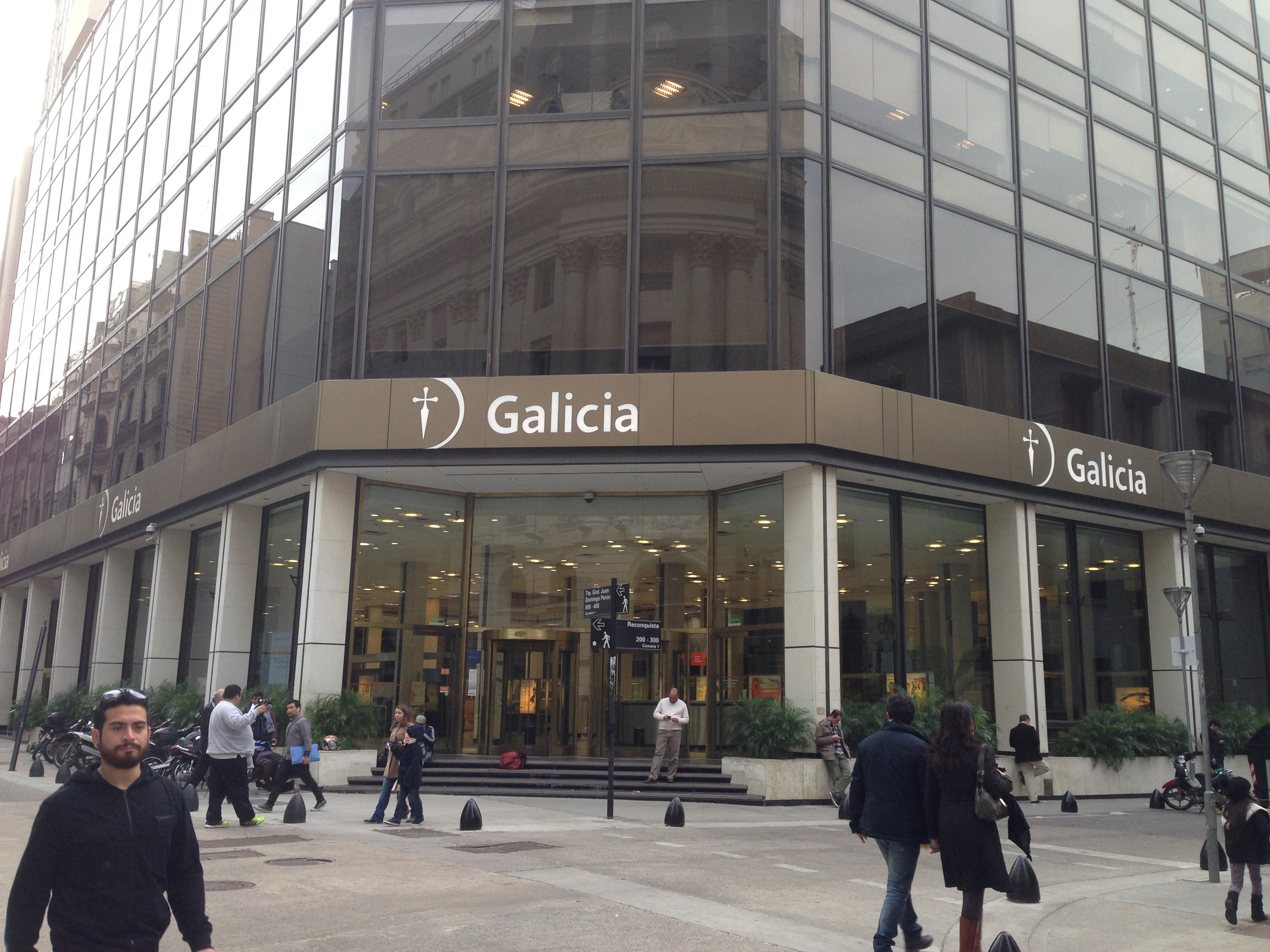
Branch of Banco Galicia.

On June 5, 2025, the bank announced through its social media that Galicia Más would merge with Banco Galicia ("Galicia Bank") on June 23 of that year as part of its final integration. Its employees and branches will become part of Banco Galicia. With this merger, the bank is expected to add more than 700,000 customers, 3,000 employees, and 100 branches. Meanwhile, its insurance company, Galicia Más Seguros, will merge and become Galicia Seguros on June 20, 2025.

On June 19, 2025, Galicia Más announced through its networks that starting Saturday the 21st, customers will be able to manage their accounts exclusively through the Banco Galicia app and online banking. At 6:00 PM that same day, Galicia Más contact channels (phone and email) were closed, and both the app and online banking were no longer available at 9:00 PM.

== Operations ==
GGAL Holdings was composed of Banco GGAL S.A. (Galicia Más), GGAL Seguros S.A., GGAL Seguros de Retiro S.A., and GGAL Asset Management S.A. S.G.F.C.I.

== Branches ==
Below is a list of the number of branches Galicia Más had until its closure in 2025:

Galicia Más branches (as of June 2025)
Order	Province	Amount
1	City of Buenos Aires	29
2	Buenos Aires Province	28
3	Santa Fe	4
4	Córdoba	6
5	Corrientes	1
6	Chaco	1
7	Chubut	2
8	Entre Rios Province	1
9	Jujuy	1
10	Mendoza	5
11	Misiones	1
12	Neuquén	2
13	Río Negro	3
14	Salta	1
15	San Juan	1
16	Santa Cruz	2
17	Tucumán	3
18	Tierra del Fuego	2
