= HSBC Bank Argentina =

Argentine bank

Coordinates: 34°36′19.5″S 58°22′29.5″W

HSBC Bank Argentina S.A.

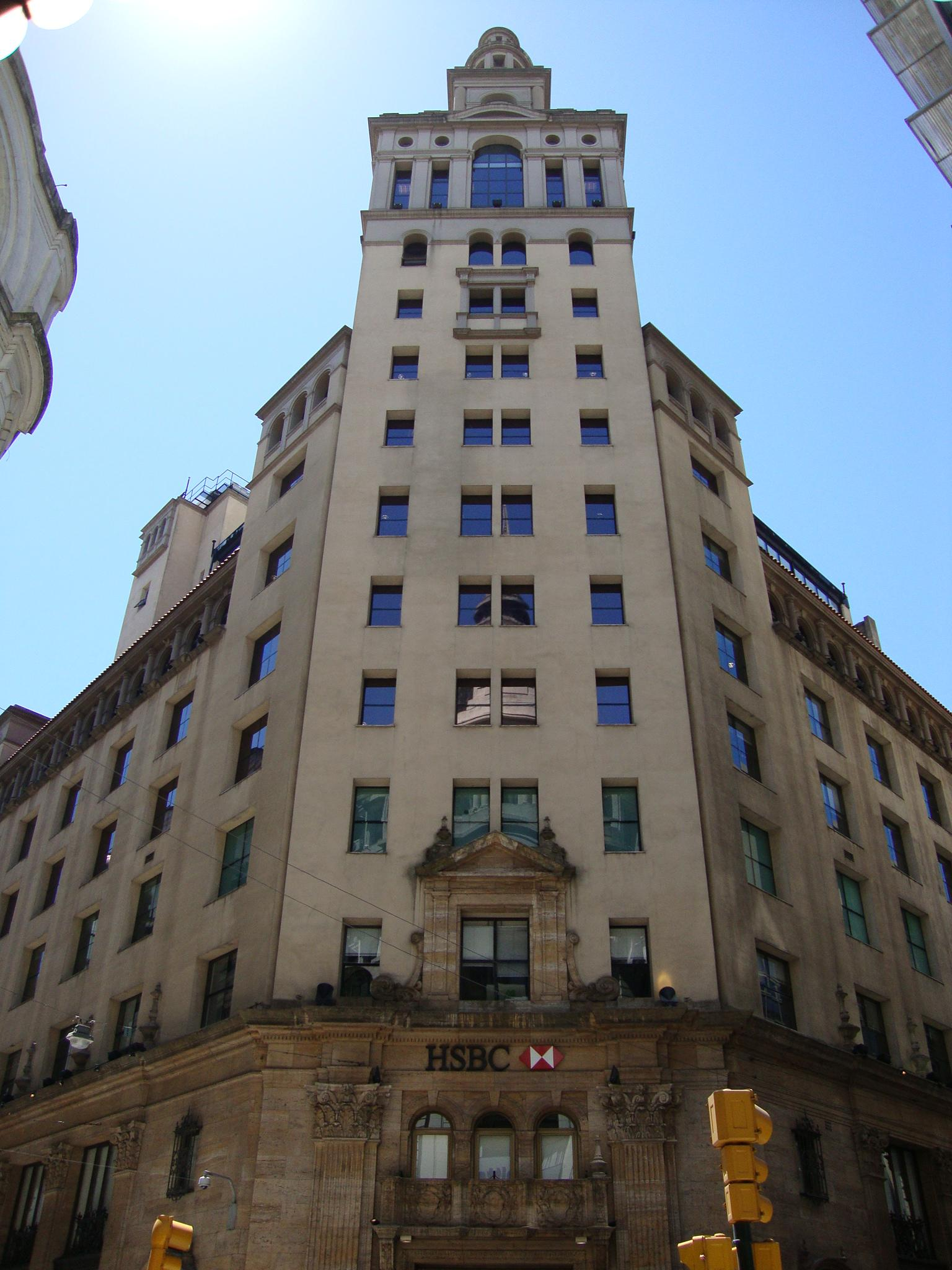
- Company type: Private
- Industry: Finance and Insurance; Pension funds
- Founded: 1903; 123 years ago
- Defunct: December 6, 2024
- Fate: Disappearance of the HSBC brand in Argentina; Merger with Banco Galicia as a result of the acquisition
- Successor: Galicia Más
- Headquarters: Hipolito Bouchard 557, Buenos Aires, Argentina
- Key people: Julian Aristiqui (president)
- Products: Financial services
- Website: hsbc.com.ar

HSBC Bank Argentina S.A. was the principal HSBC operating company in Argentina. It was the seventh-largest bank in the country, it provided a full range of banking and financial products and services, including commercial, consumer and corporate banking, to over 1.2 million customers.

In April 2024, HSBC reached an agreement to sell its banking operations in Argentina to Banco Galicia. The re-brand process took about 12 months. As a result of the acquisition by Galicia Financial Group, on December 6, 2024, at 7:00 p.m., HSBC Argentina disconnected from the global HSBC Group network and progressively switched to the Galicia Más brand, officially ceasing to exist in Argentina after 32 years of uninterrupted operations in the country.

== History ==
Midland Bank purchased a stake in Banco Roberts, a subsidiary established in 1903 by the historic Anglo-South American Bank, in 1987. HSBC Group acquired Midland in 1992. In 1997, the Group acquired the remaining shares in the Roberts Group holding company and renamed it HSBC Argentina Holdings SA.

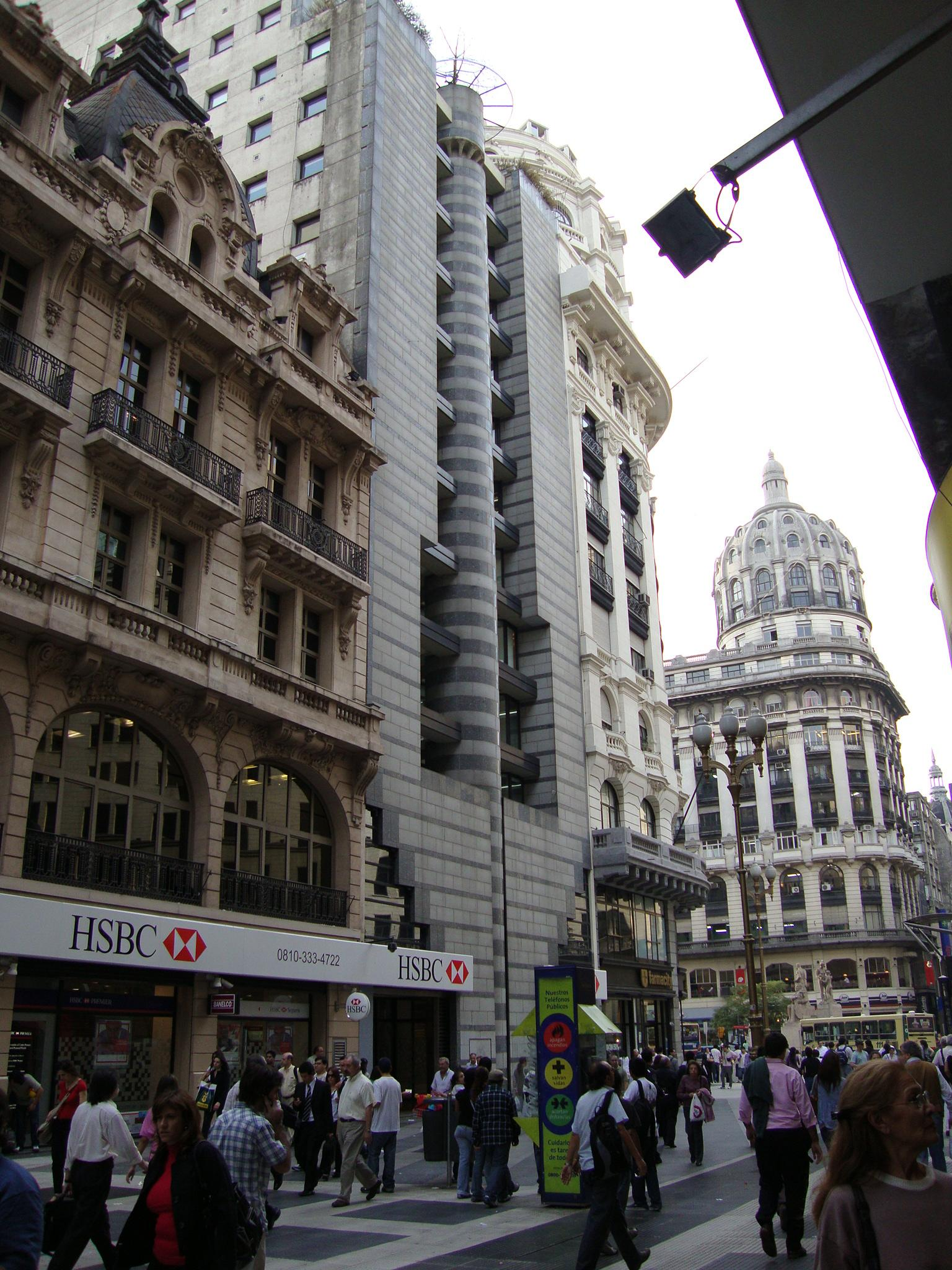
The former Argentine head office of BNL, now an HSBC branch

In 2006, HSBC announced that it had signed an agreement with Banca Nazionale del Lavoro SpA to acquire the latter's banking operations in Argentina, Banca Nazionale del Lavoro S.A. (BNL), for US$155 million. BNL had started operating in Argentina in 1960 and had 91 branches in 18 provinces, 700,000 active personal customers and 26,700 commercial customers when the HSBC takeover was completed on 28 April 2006. HSBC rebranded the Argentine operations of BNL as "BNL en Argentina es HSBC" (BNL in Argentina is HSBC), and for two years, maintained the link to BNL, mainly for the community of 70,000 Italian Argentines receiving pensions from Italy.

Simon Martin, President of HSBC Argentina, was appointed head of the mother company's group sustainability and corporate responsibility office in 2007.

The group, headquartered since 1996 in a modern, Avenida de Mayo high-rise, relocated in 2009 to the historic, former Banco Popular Argentino headquarters. The Plateresque building, designed by Antonio and Carlos Vilar, was completed in 1931. Located on Florida Street, it became property of Banco Roberts upon the latter's acquisition of the Banco Popular in 1996, and was transferred to HSBC Argentina upon Roberts' merger the following year.

=== December 20, 2001, incident ===
On December 20, 2001, at the height of the December 2001 riots in Argentina, HSBC security personnel opened fire from inside the HSBC Buenos Aires headquarters building against civilians that had been marching to Plaza de Mayo to demonstrate against President Fernando de la Rúa who resigned a day later. Gustavo Ariel Benedetto was murdered by a 9 mm gunshot to his head in this episode. HSBC's security video recordings demonstrated later that security personnel actually opened fire while not being at any substantial risk since marchers were not able to enter the building.

== Sale of HSBC operation in Argentina in 2024 ==
On April 9, 2024, HSBC reported that it sold its business in Argentina for $550 million to Grupo Financiero Galicia and Galicia Bank. This will make Galicia the country's leading private financial institution and the second largest by size behind Banco Nación.

The operation includes the sale of all of HSBC Argentina's businesses, including the Bank, Asset Management, and its insurance company, in addition to $100 million in subordinated debt issued by HSBC Bank Argentina.

"Galicia will acquire all of HSBC Argentina's businesses including the bank, asset management and insurance along with US$100 million of subordinated debt issued by HSBC Bank Argentina and held by other HSBC entities, for a consideration of US$ 550 million, which will be adjusted by the business results and the fair value gains or losses of HSBC Argentina's securities portfolio during the period between December 31, 2023 and the closing of the operation," detailed the official announcement

HSBC Holdings plc estimates that it will assume an adverse pre-tax impact of $1 billion (€922 million) following the reclassification of the business as held for sale in the first quarter of 2024. From the date of sale, it was estimated that the transaction would be completed within the next 12 months, a fact that already happened when the necessary regulations were approved.

=== Final stage of acquisition ===
Logo used from 1997 to 2024, the classic hexagon logo.

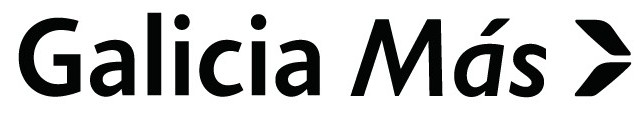
Provisional logo chosen by Galicia to replace HSBC.

On November 26, 2024, HSBC Argentina reported through its website that the final stage of the acquisition and the change of commercial brand scheduled for December 6, 2024, the day on which HSBC would cease to exist in Argentina officially:

"We want to inform you that the closing of the sale of HSBC Argentina to Grupo Financiero Galicia and Banco Galicia is expected to be completed on December 6, 2024. From that moment on, Grupo Financiero Galicia and Banco Galicia will acquire ownership of HSBC Argentina, which will have the temporary name Galicia Más, and which will operate separately from Banco Galicia until the integration of Banco Galicia and Galicia Más, which is expected in 2025."

=== Galicia definitively acquires HSBC Argentina ===
On Friday, December 6, 2024, Grupo Galicia announces that the final stage of the acquisition was completed and acquired full ownership of HSBC Argentina in a statement.

"Buenos Aires, December 6, 2024.

Grupo Financiero Galicia and Banco Galicia report that the purchase of all the operations of the HSBC Group in Argentina was completed, which include the Bank, the Common Investment Fund Administrator and the Insurance companies Retirement and Life. The transaction had been made public on April 9, was approved by the Central Bank of the Argentine Republic on September 12 and, finally, the technological separation of HSBC Argentina from HSBC Global was completed, allowing the completion of the operation.

The closing of the transaction involved the payment of US$ 275 million, the issuance and delivery of 11.38 million American Depositary Receipts (ADRs) by Grupo Financiero Galicia plus a price adjustment in accordance with an agreed mechanism. This operation will make Banco Galicia the largest private bank in Argentina, both in terms of deposits and loans, adding more than 750,000 clients, 3,000 employees and 100 branches."

== Operations ==
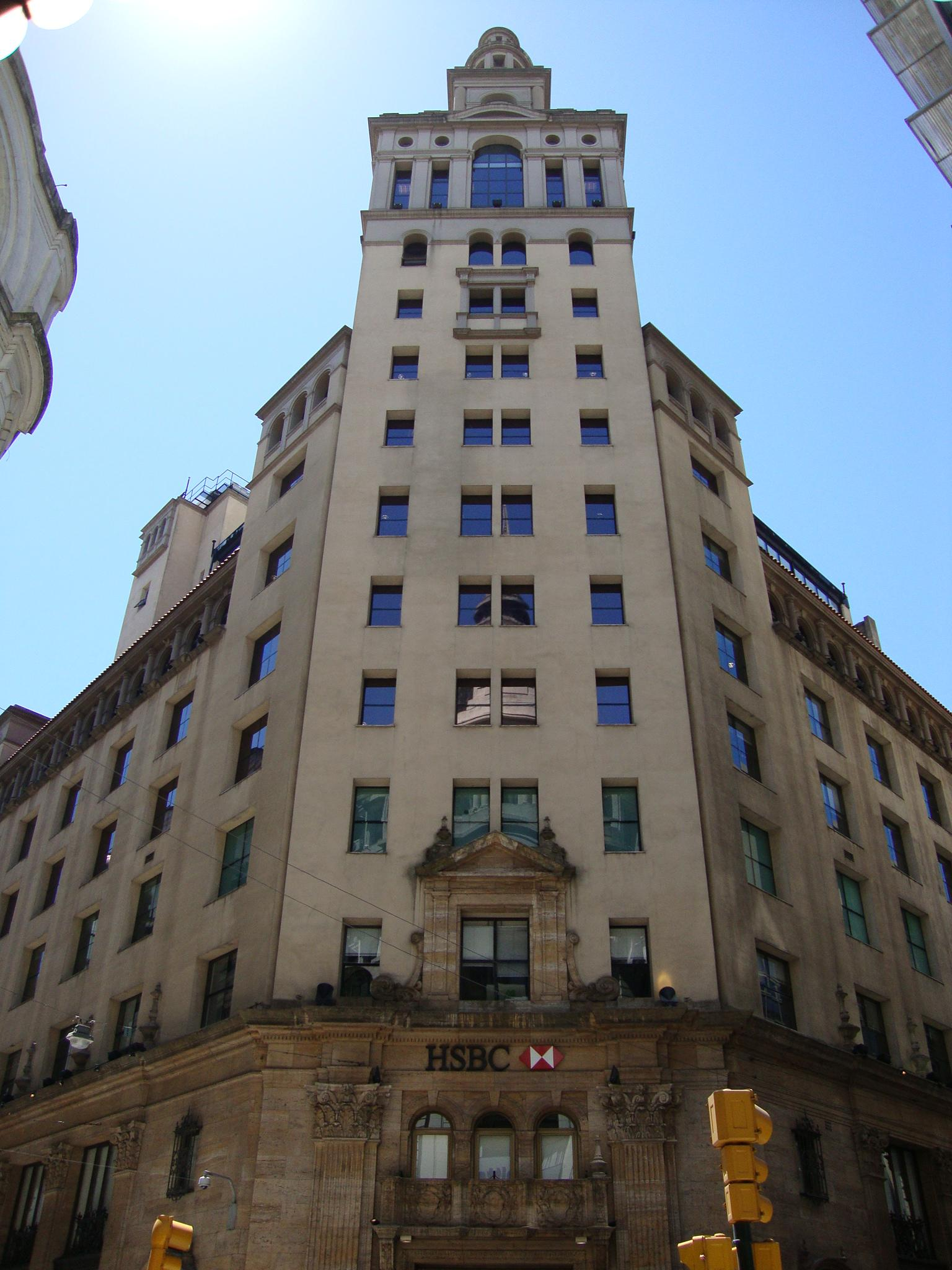
Headquarters in Buenos Aires

HSBC Argentina was one of the largest financial organizations in Argentina and comprises HSBC Bank Argentina, HSBC MAXIMA AFJP, HSBC La Buenos Aires and HSBC New York Life. Proa was a local consumer finance company set up to draw on the experience and knowledge of HSBC Finance Corporation. The group's product and service distribution network included 139 retail bank branches nationwide, as well as financial and pension fund offices. HSBC Argentina maintained deposits of around US$3 billion, and a lending portfolio of nearly US$2 billion (both around 4% of the domestic market).

== See also ==
- HSBC Holdings plc
