= Mongolian Bankers Association =

Private banking representative

- Abbreviation: MBA
- Formation: 2000
- Legal status: Non-profit non-government organization
- Headquarters: Ulaanbaatar
- Location: 6th floor, Labor Palace, Jigjidjav's street,1st khoroo, Chingeltei district, Ulaanbaatar
- Region served: Mongolia
- Members: 12 commercial banks, a development bank, representative offices of foreign banks, financial sector infrastructure organizations, and fintech companies
- Website: www.mba.mn

The Mongolian Bankers Association (MBA) is an independent, non-profit, and non-government organization under which the banking and non-banking financial institutions officially licensed to operate within the territory of Mongolia are unified. The role of the MBA is to represent the interests of the banking sector and serve its members as a sounding board for policy discussions.

With 36 members, the association integrates all 12 commercial banks, a development bank, representative offices of foreign banks, financial sector infrastructure organizations, and fintech companies. These members all aim to lead the banking and financial sector in support of the sustainable development and equitable economic growth of Mongolia.

Considerable efforts were made to amplify cooperation with other international banking associations, namely the Asian Bankers Association, the Korea Federation of Banks, the Association of Russian Banks, and the Uzbekistan Banking Association, as well as with international financial institutions.

Furthermore, to facilitate and leverage the financial development of Mongolia, it has initiated and established the Banking and Finance Academy, the Credit Information Bureau, the Mongolian Mortgage Corporation, the Mongolian Green Finance Corporation, and the Billion Tree Fund in cooperation with its members.

== History ==
The Mongolian Bankers Association is a self-regulated professional association established in 2000.

== Structure ==
The day-to-day activities of the MBA are managed by the Secretariat, a team of 6, under the direct supervision of the chief executive and secretary-general and guidance from the MBA Board of Directors.

== Activity ==
As the united voice of Mongolian banks, MBA is committed to:

- Sector relative policy proposals and initiatives;
- Multistakeholder projects;
- Supervisory, legal draft reviews;
- Bankers' self-development, knowledge exchanges, and interactive platforms;
- Forums, events, and discussions;
- Close collaborations with international banking and financial institutions;
- Professional outlooks, sectoral reviews, and news.

Weekly newsletters have been published since the first quarter of 2007 to provide a network for members to exchange views and offer opportunities for effective communication, to deliver news to their customers and legal entities, and to efficiently promote the operation of the association

Aimed at contributing to the development of Mongolia's banking sector and creating a supportive policy environment and financial infrastructure, MBA has established the following institutions in cooperation with its member organizations:

- The Banking and Finance Academy – to conduct training and capacity development programs on banking and finance;
- The Credit Guarantee Fund – to provide credit guarantee service;
- The Mongolian Mortgage Corporation – to develop first and second mortgage markets;
- The Mongolian Sustainable Finance Association- and develop sustainable financing policies;
- The Mongolian Green Finance Corporation; to create a national-level green financing system in Mongolia;
- The Billion Tree Fund; aims to contribute the banking sector to the national tree planting movement.

=== Awards ===
- Jade Medal
- Best Banker
- Appreciation

== Professional councils ==
As a professional industry association and a union of bankers and financial experts, MBA has established several professional councils. These councils enable staff and subject experts from member organizations to have regular meetings to share their knowledge and experiences, and to discuss current banking and financial sector updates.

MBA's daily work and policy positions, recommendations, and supervisory document reviews are guided by the input of member bankers who serve on 15 professional councils in all areas of banking.

In addition to close collaborations among professional council members, these councils make valuable expert opinions to the MBA Board of Directors on sector-specific concerns, public-private joint discussions, advocacy papers, and other activities.

To amplify the status as a professional association for banking and financial professionals, the risk management, legal, human resource, special asset management, marketing, and fintech expert consultants' councils were set up by the secretariat of the association. The MBA secretariat, chaired by the chief executive and secretary-general, coordinates the daily operation of the association in conformity with the resolutions, decisions, and directions of the board of directors.

== Organization ==
=== Presidents ===
- Bold L.,/2000.09.29 – 2005.03.25/ Former Parliament member, CEO of Golomt Bank of Mongolia
- Oyunjargal D., /2005.03.25 – 2006.06.28/ Former CEO of the Mongol Post Bank
- Saintsogt Ch., /2006.06.28 – 2007.08.24/ Former CEO of the Chinggis Khaan Bank
- Chudanjii Sh., /2007.08.24 – 2010.05.14/ Former CEO of Zoos Bank
- Medree B.,/2010.05.14 – 2011.12.16/ Former CEO of the Trade and Development Bank of Mongolia
- Bold M., /2011.12.16 – 2014.12.16/ Former CEO of Хас Bank
- Orkhon O., /2014.12.16 – 2018.02.08/ CEO of the Trade and Development Bank of Mongolia
- Ganzorig U., /2018.02.08 – 2019.09.05/ Former CEO of Golomt Bank
- Medree B., /2019.09.05- present/ Former President of the Trade and Development Bank of Mongolia

=== Vice presidents ===
- Zorigt D., /2000.09.29 – 2005.03.25/ Former Person in Attorney of the Mongol Post Bank
- Tsetseg-Ochir B., /2000.09.29 – 2005.03.25/ Former Chairman of the Trade and Development bank of Mongolia
- Munkhbat S., /2005.03.25 – 2006.06.28 / Former CEO of the Trade and Development Bank of Mongolia
- Badraa B., /2005.03.25 – 2006.06.28/
- Gur-Aranz E., /2006.06.28 – 2007.08.24/ Former CEO of Anod Bank
- Chudanjii Sh., /2006.06.28 – 2007.08.24/ Former CEO of Zoos Bank
- Bold M., /2007.08.24 – 2012.12.16/ Former CEO of the Tenger Financial Group
- Medree B., /2012.12.16 – 2014.12.16/ Former CEO of Trade and Development bank of Mongolia
- Chingun M., /2012.12.16 – 2014.12.16/ Former Deputy CEO of the Golomt Bank
- Davaa P., /2012.12.16 – 2013.12.16/ Former CEO of the National Investment Bank
- Medree B., /2014.12.16 -2015.12.16/ Former CEO of the Trade and Development bank of Mongolia
- Norihiko Kato /2013.12.16 – 2016.12.15/ Former CEO of the KHAN Bank
- Lkhagvasuren B., /2014.12.16 – 2016.12.15/ Former CEO of the DICOM, Present Governor of the Bank of Mongoli
- Tumurkhuu D., /2014.12.16 – 2017.12.15/ Former CEO of Arig Bank
- Tserendavaa N., /2016.12.15 – 2017.12.15/ Former Deputy CEO of Golomt Bank
- Bayarsaikhan D., /2016.12.15 – 2019.09.05/ Former Managing Director of the State Bank
- Torsten Kleine Buening /2017.12.15 – 2019.09.05/ Former Chief Risk Officer of Xacbank
- Banzragch O, /2017.12.15 – 20- 2020.12.22/, First Deputy CEO of the Trade and Development Bank of Mongolia
- Otgonbayar M, /2017.12.15-20 – 2020.12.22/, Former CEO of the Trans Bank
- Norihiko Kato /2019.12.16 – 2021.12.08/, CEO of the Golomt Bank
- Ariunaa L, /2020.12.22 – 2021.07.02/, Former CEO of the Capitron Bank
- Munkhtuya R, /2020.12.22 –2023.12.08/, CEO of the Khan Bank
- Battulga D, /2020.12.22 –2022.12.08/ Former Deputy CFO of the State Bank
- Saruul G, /2022.12-08 - present/, CEO of the Bogd Bank
- Uurtsaikhbaatar B, /2022.12.08 - present/, CEO of the Capitron Bank
- Ganbold G, /2023.12.08 - present/, President of the Golomt Bank

=== Chief executive and secretaries-general ===
- Unenbat J., /2000.09.29 – 2005.04.07/ Former Governor of the Bank of Mongolia
- Tserenpurev G., /2005.04.07 – 2009.02.04/ Board member of International Bank for Economic Co-operation in Moskwa
- Shagdarsuren Z., /2009.02.05 -2012.3.22/ Financial lawyer and Attorney
- Tur-Od L., /2012.03.22 – 2012.09.15/ Former Advisory to the President of Mongolia
- Naidalaa B., /2012.09.17 – 2015.09.17/ Development Economist
- Unenbat J., /2015.11.09–2020.02.06/ Former Governor of the Bank of Mongolia
- Amar L.,/2020.02.07- present/ Former Economist at ADB Mongolia
