= Banking and Finance Academy (Mongolia) =

Educational organization based in Ulaanbaatar, Mongolia

Banking and Finance Academy of Mongolia
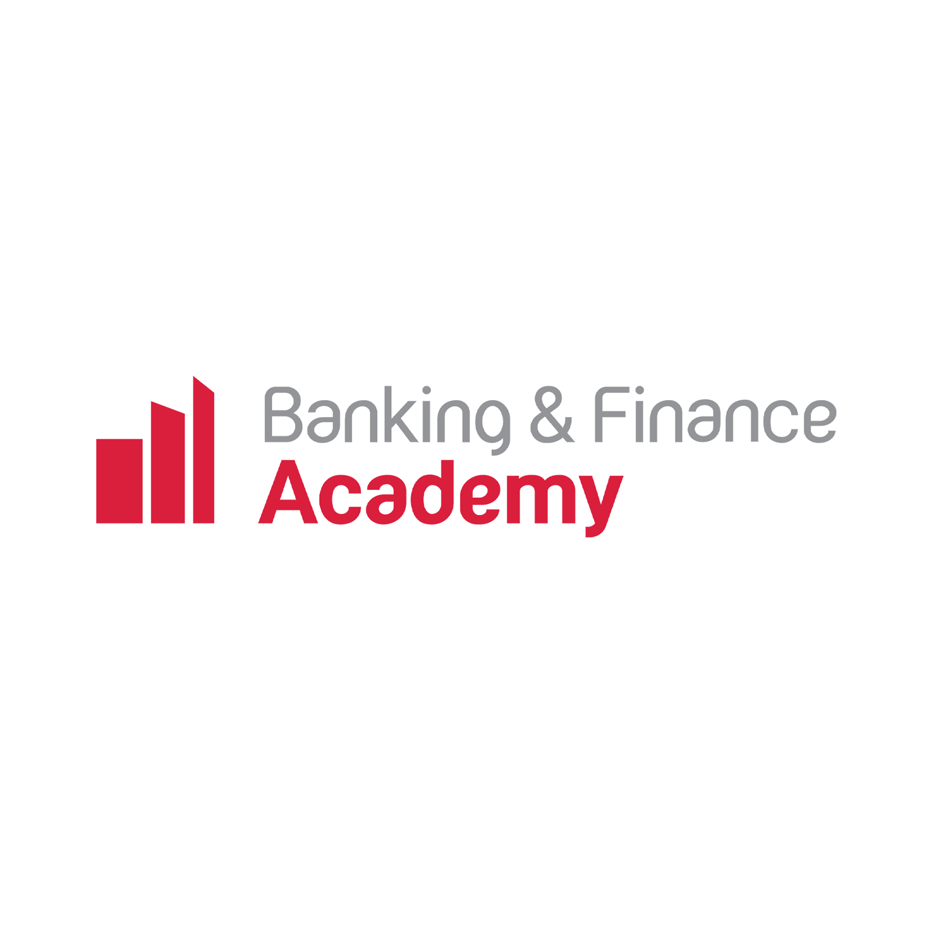

- Vista Office building which houses the Banking and Finance Academy
- Abbreviation: BFA
- Formation: 2010/10/01
- Location: 2nd floor, Vista office, 1st khoroo, Sukhbaatar district, Ulaanbaatar city
- Region served: Mongolia
- CEO: BUMCHIMEG Gungaa
- Website: www.bfa.mn

The Banking and Finance Academy (BFA; Mongolian: Банк Санхүүгийн Академи) was established in 2010 by eight shareholding commercial banks of Mongolia and the bank training institute which operated under Central Bank of Mongolia merged with it in 2012. The shareholding banks were Trade and Development Bank (TDB), Golomt bank, Khan bank, National Investment bank, Erel bank, Chingis Khan Bank, and the State Bank. The primary purpose of this Academy is to provide training services and certification for Mongolian banking and financial professionals and practitioners.

== Employees ==
In 2023 BFA will have 10 employees.

=== Board members ===
- Ganbyamba.Sh (Chairperson) – Vice president, Human resources, Khan Bank
- Enkhtaivan.G – Deputy governor of Bank of Mongolia
- Medree.B – President of Mongolian Bankers Association
- Odontungalag.B – Head, Public education and information department of Bank of Mongolia
- Markus Loch – Country representative, German Sparkassenstiftung Mongolia
- Enkhmend.A – Deputy CEO of Trade and Development Bank of Mongolia
- Namjilmaa.Ch – Director, Operation department of Capitron Bank

== See also ==
- Bank of Mongolia
- Mongolian Bankers Association
