= Chinese-issued U.S. dollar bonds =

Chinese-issued U.S. dollar bonds are dollar-denominated bond issued by Chinese financial institutions and corporations.

In 2017 this part of the bond market doubled to $214 billion as tighter domestic regulations and market conditions saw Chinese companies look offshore to raise capital. This far outpaced the other major foreign currency bonds issued in Asia. Chinese issuance of dollar bonds make up nearly 70% of corporate dollar bonds in Asia (excluding Japan).

Major issuers include Tencent Holdings Limited, Industrial and Commercial Bank of China Limited and Sinopec Group. In 2017, China's Ministry of Finance revealed plans to sell US$2 billion worth of sovereign dollar bonds in Hong Kong, its first dollar bond offering since October 2004. The technology and communications sector in China made up a significant share of the offshore U.S. dollar bond market. Tencent priced $5 billion of notes in January 2018.

U.S dollar-denominated bonds issued by Chinese institutions have been referred to as Kungfu bonds, a term born out of a consultation with more than 400 market participants across Asia by Bloomberg L.P.

== See also ==
- Dim sum bond
- Panda bond
- Kimchi bond
- Samurai bond
- Foreign currency denominated bond
