= Naranja X =

Argentine fintech company

Tarjetas Regionales S.A.

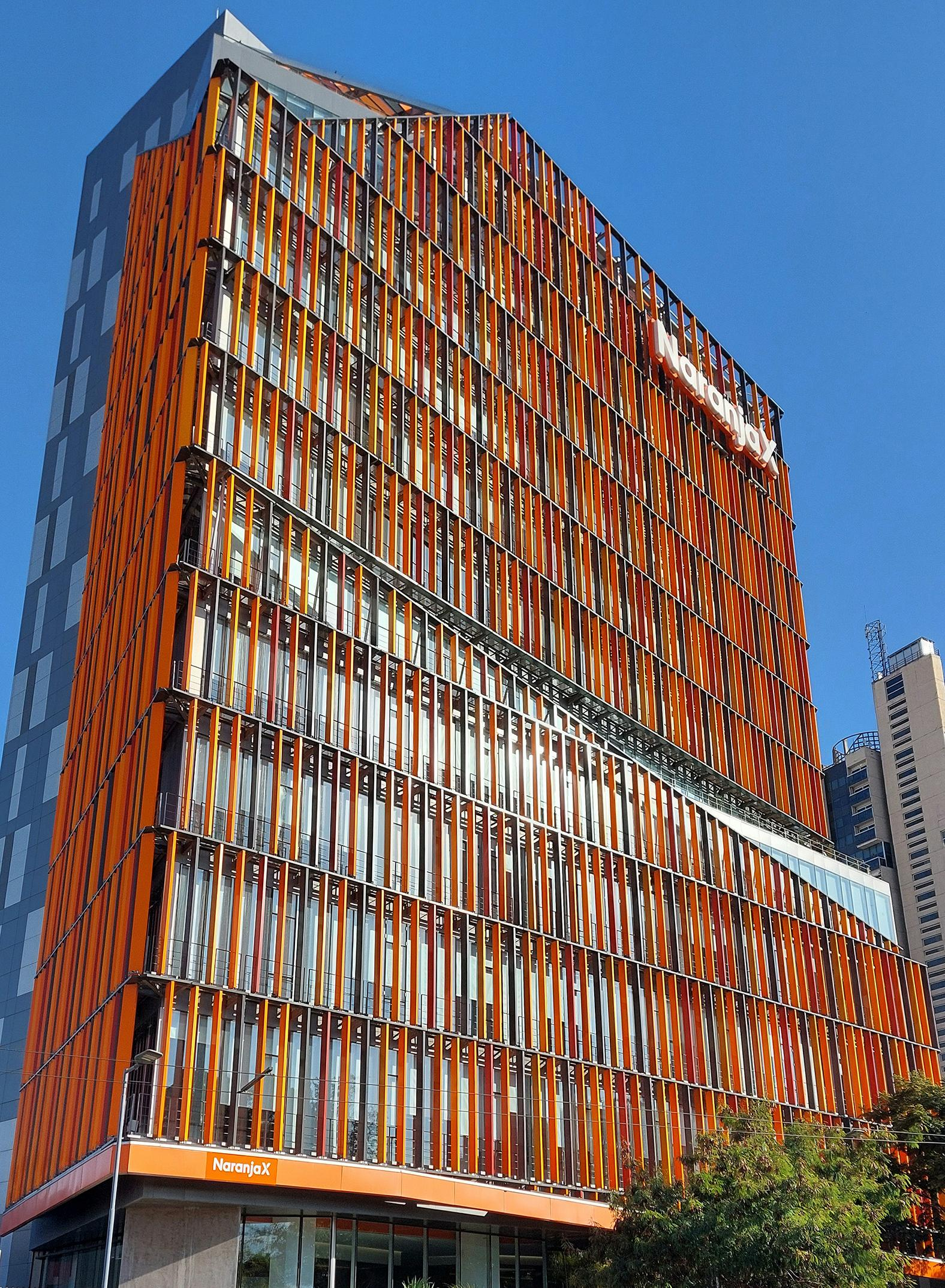
- Trade name: Naranja X
- Type: Sociedad Anónima
- Predecessor: Tarjeta Naranja
- Founded: 3 May 1985
- Founder: David Ruda; Gerardo Asrin
- Headquarters: Córdoba, Argentina
- Area served: Argentina
- Key people: Pablo Caputto (CEO); Miguel Ángel Peña (President); Alejandro Asrin (Vice President)
- Products: Credit cards, Debit cards, Savings accounts, Loans
- Number of employees: 2,800 (2024)
- Parent: Grupo Financiero Galicia
- Subsidiaries: Naranja Digital Compañía Financiera S.A.U. (Banking services and debit cards); Tarjeta Naranja S.A.U. (Credit cards and stores)
- Website: www.naranjax.com

Naranja X (NX; formerly known as Tarjeta Naranja) is an Argentine fintech company with headquarters in Córdoba and Buenos Aires. Founded in 1985, Naranja X offers a wide range of financial services, including loans, credit cards, and other financial products within its ecosystem.

== History ==
Founded in 1985, Tarjeta Naranja started in Córdoba with the goal of providing in-house financing to customers of the Salto 96 sports store, created by entrepreneurs and physical education teachers David Ruda and Gerardo Asrin. Gerardo Asrin died in 2017.

In 1995, Banco Galicia became a shareholder, acquiring 49% of the shares, which drove Tarjeta Naranja's expansion across Argentina and the introduction of new financial services and plans. This support quickly accelerated the company's growth, leading the bank to increase its stake from 49% to 80% in 1998 through capital contributions and by purchasing additional shares from Ruda and Asrin.

The company then focused on providing financial services, primarily through credit cards. Over the years, Naranja X has expanded its services and established a broad network of branches and customer service points throughout the country.

Naranja X offers a variety of financial products, including credit cards, personal loans, and insurance.

In 2017, the company rebranded as Naranja, aiming to expand its product portfolio. In 2018, it merged with Tarjeta Nevada, extending its presence to Mendoza and San Juan.

With two main offices in Córdoba and Buenos Aires, Naranja X has established a presence across Argentina with a network of over 180 branches.

== Products ==
The financial services offered by Naranja X to consumers vary according to regulatory and commercial availability within Argentina. These include the following categories:

=== Credit Cards ===
Issued by Tarjeta Naranja S.A.U., regulated by the Central Bank of Argentina.

- Mastercard
- Visa
- Naranja X (Proprietary card)

=== Debit Cards ===
Linked to the digital account provided by Naranja Digital Compañía Financiera S.A.U.

- Naranja X Visa Debit Card

=== Digital account ===
Managed by Naranja Digital Compañía Financiera S.A.U.

- Argentine peso (ARS) account
- U.S. dollar (USD) account
- Interest-bearing account

=== Loans and financing ===
Granted under the regulations of the Central Bank of Argentina.

- Personal loans
- Point-of-sale financing
- Installment financing with credit cards

=== Insurance ===
Distributed through agreements with insurance companies registered with the National Superintendency of Insurance (SSN).

- Life, auto, and home insurance
- Assistance services and complementary coverage

=== Transactional services ===
Operations available through the mobile application, subject to local financial and foreign exchange regulations.

- Bill payments and mobile top-ups
- Purchase and sale of MEP dollars (Dólar MEP)
- Domestic transfers
- Personal finance management (spending, limits, and account movements)

=== Mobile payments ===
Users may link their financial instruments to compatible mobile payment systems, in accordance with issuer policies and device availability.
