= Schengen bond =

A Schengen bond is a bond denominated in offshore Renminbi, and more specifically refers to bonds listed on the Luxembourg Stock Exchange and issued by a Chinese company.

== Origin ==
On 8 May 2014, Bank of China Limited, Luxembourg Branch, launched its first offshore-RMB “Schengen” bond, for an amount of RMB 1.5 billion. The transaction was done under the US$10 billion MTN programme of the Bank of China Group. With the support from international and local institutional investors, the issuance was around 2 times oversubscribed. It was priced at 3.50% for the 3-year bond.

On 15 May 2014, it was listed on the Luxembourg Stock Exchange.

This first offshore-RMB bond was originally named ‘Schengen’ bond due to the fact that ‘Schengen’ has a particular meaning in European countries. It is a reference to the name of a small village in Luxembourg that borders France and Germany, where the Schengen agreement permitting the free movement of persons within the Schengen area was signed. Additionally, the pronunciation of ‘Schengen’ (Chinese: 申根; pinyin: Shēngēn) in Chinese represents the meaning of “root here and develop here” (Chinese: 深根; pinyin: Shēngēn).

== Significance ==
Compared to Dim sum bonds, Schengen bonds are the offshore RMB bonds listed in Europe, featuring a new trend of the internationalization of RMB and establishing a brand name for the RMB bonds in the Eurozone.

== See also ==
- Foreign currency denominated bond
- Eurobond
