= EU taxonomy for sustainable activities =

Classification system for economic activities

Regulation 2020/852
- European Union regulation
- Title: on the establishment of a framework to facilitate sustainable investment
- Made by: European Parliament and Council
- Made under: Article 114 TFEU
- Journal reference: L 198/13, 22 June 2020

Other legislation
- Amends: Regulation (EU) 2019/2088, the Sustainable Finance Disclosure Regulation

The EU taxonomy for sustainable activities (a green taxonomy) is a classification system established to clarify which economic activities are environmentally sustainable, in the context of the European Green Deal. The aim of the taxonomy is to prevent greenwashing and to help investors make informed sustainable investment decisions. The Taxonomy covers activities contributing to six environmental objectives: climate change mitigation, climate change adaptation, the transition to a circular economy, pollution prevention and control, sustainable use and protection of water and marine resources, and protection and restoration of biodiversity and ecosystems. The Taxonomy came into force in July 2020. The UK is working on its own separate taxonomy.

== General overview ==
The European Union (EU) Taxonomy was implemented as part of the European Green Deal initiatives. The EU launched the European Green Deal in line with the Paris Agreement goals, setting out the objectives to achieve a carbon neutral economy by 2050. The European Green Deal is based on the European Action Plan with the aim of strengthening sustainable growth funds, with the goal of reorienting capital flows towards sustainable investment. Sustainable finance is one of the main pillars of the EU Green Deal and requires the private sector and investors in general to divert their financing towards a green transition. Therefore, to meet the objectives of the European Green Deal, the European Commission (EC) diverges towards investments having sustainable projects and activities. This Action plan then led to the EU taxonomy.

The EU taxonomy is a green classification scheme for specific economic activities to evaluate their environmental performance. In essence, the EU Taxonomy is a system which determines environmentally sustainable activities and provides ways through which a company can calculate its sustainability turnover. The EU Taxonomy Regulation was officially published by the EU on 22 June 2020, after its endorsement by the European Parliament on 18 June 2020 and took effect on 12 July 2020. As of now, the EU taxonomy is considered one of the main pace setters which aids the financial system redirect capital towards a low carbon economy conforming to the Paris Agreement. Upon findings by the Technical Expert Group (TEG), the EU taxonomy has undergone various testing in both private and public sectors which includes the European Investment Bank and BNP Paribas asset management.

=== Preparatory work ===
The preparatory work started in 2018, when the Commission set up a Technical Expert Group on Sustainable Finance, to assist in developing the EU Taxonomy, with the OECD as an observer. In the case of Taxonomy, the main task of the TEG was to develop technical screening criteria that would be used to determine whether an activity is environmentally sustainable. A first report was published by TEG at the end of 2018. This introduced the first criteria for activities contributing to climate change mitigation, one of the six environmental objectives of the Taxonomy, and was accompanied by a call for feedback regarding the proposed criteria on climate change mitigation and on the usability of the taxonomy. The final report on EU Taxonomy was published by the TEG in March 2020, containing the responses to the call for feedback, recommendations to the commission on taxonomy design, a practical guide for taxonomy users on how to make disclosures, and recommendations to the Platform on Sustainable Finance, which had not yet been established at the time of the publication of the report. The TEG final report was accompanied by a technical annex, which contained an updated methodology for assessing the "substantial contribution" of an economic activity to climate change mitigation, updated technical screening criteria, and new criteria regarding activities whose inclusion in the taxonomy may be taken into account in the future. The TEG mandate, which was originally supposed to end in June 2019, was extended until September 2020, due to the high volume of feedbacks received after the publication of the first report. The TEG continued to operate with advisory functions after the publication of the final technical report, waiting for the Platform on Sustainable Finance to be operational.

=== Objectives ===
Despite its potential to providing a sustainable finance to its proponents, the EU Taxonomy remains a voluntary action. It is made available for companies and investors who desire to ameliorate their climate and environmental stakes, to use this as an adaptable framework. For those who wish to rely on the EU taxonomy, there is a provision of attainable and consistent objectives which provides a common understanding of what green economic activities are and therefore part of the EU environmental goals. A Technical Expert Group was assigned in July 2018 to draft the first version of technical assessment criteria, make certain that the said criteria are in accordance with the EU's climate protection goals. this led to the submission of the first proposal in for the EU Taxonomy in March 2020. This identified six environmental objectives, which an economic activity must adhere to, to be included in the EU Taxonomy. The 6 EU environmental objectives laid by the Taxonomy Regulation are:

- climate change mitigation,
- climate change adaptation,
- sustainable use and protection of water and marine resources,
- transition to a circular economy,
- pollution prevention and control, and
- protection and restoration of biodiversity and ecosystems.

=== Requirements ===
For an economic activity be certified as being environmentally sustainable in keeping with respect to the Taxonomy, substantial contribution must be made to at least one of the aforementioned objectives and simultaneously have no significant detrimental impact on the other five. The principle in accordance with this is called 'Do No Significant Harm' (DNSH). Aside the 6 environmental objectives, the EU taxonomy also set forth four (4) requirements to be met by an economic activity in order to be taxonomy oriented:

- making a substantial contribution to at least one environmental objective.
- doing no significant harm to any other environmental objective.
- complying with minimum social safeguards.
- complying with the technical screening criteria.

== The main actors involved in the lawmaking process ==
The main actors involved in the legislative process aimed at setting up the Taxonomy are, at different stages and to different extent:

- the European Commission,
- the Technical Expert Group on sustainable finance (TEG),
- the Member States Expert Group on sustainable finance (MSEG),
- the Platform on Sustainable Finance,
- the European Parliament and the Council.

The TEG was composed of 35 members of different nature, ranging from business lobbies to environmental organisations. It played the main role at the preparatory stage, when was tasked with developing recommendations to the Commission regarding both the overall structure of the Taxonomy and the technical screening criteria. The Commission, based on TEG's recommendations, drafted the proposal of the Taxonomy Regulation, and the proposal was approved by the EP and the Council in accordance with the ordinary legislative procedure, which allows both the institutions to propose amendments before formal approval. Once the Taxonomy Regulation was approved, the Commission proposed three different Delegated Acts. Before proposing the DAs, the Commission was required by the Regulation to consult with the MSEG and the PSF. The former is composed of Member States’ authorities, which nominate two representatives each, while the composition of the latter is more similar to that of the TEG, with an heterogeneous mix of 57 members representing among others, business lobbies and environmental organisations. With specific regard to the Complementary Climate Delegated Act which included nuclear and gas in the taxonomy, during the consultations the PSF gave a negative feedback, while different positions have been expressed within the MSEG by different Member States. The aim of the Delegated Acts (DA) in the context of the EU Taxonomy is to set technical measures, such as the technical screening criteria which will be used to determine if certain activities are taxonomy-aligned. The choice of the DAs implies that the European Parliament and the Council cannot propose amendments, and their only possibility is to veto it as a whole. Therefore, both institutions are only involved at a later stage with no powers in shaping the content of the DAs, which is largely determined by the Commission and the expert groups.

=== Criticism ===
In addition to the concerns raised on the democratic legitimacy of the delegated acts in general, also with specific regard to the taxonomy this mechanism and the lawmaking process have been subject to criticism by some. First, according to article 290 of the Treaty on the Functioning of the European Union (TFEU), the EP and the Council can empower the Commission to adopt DAs only to "supplement or amend certain non-essential elements of the legislative act", while the content of the DAs is argued to be an essential part of the taxonomy. The Austrian government complained about, among other aspects, the insufficient time given to the MSEG and the PSF to consult and the lack of public consultations and of an impact assessment on the inclusion of gas and nuclear in the taxonomy. Similar concerns were expressed by the EP, which also complained for not having been given enough time to scrutinize the third DA.

== Delegated Acts ==
The Taxonomy Regulation expressly empowers the Commission to adopt delegated acts, after consulting the Platform on Sustainable Finance and the Member States Expert Group on Sustainable Finance. Since the entry into force of the Regulation, the Commission has adopted four delegated acts.

=== Climate Delegated Act ===
The Climate Delegated Act, was adopted in June 2021 and published on the Official Journal in December of the same year. It establishes technical screening criteria to determine whether an economic activity substantially contributes to climate change adaptation and climate change mitigation. Despite the significant political debate on the possible inclusion of nuclear power and natural gas as green investments, neither of them is labelled as green asset in the first delegated act. In its preamble is stated that for nuclear energy the assessment is still ongoing, and natural gas will be included in a future delegated act if it fulfilled the requirements to be considered a transitional activity.

=== Disclosures Delegated Act ===
The Disclosures Delegated Act was adopted by the Commission in July 2021 and published on the Official Journal in December 2021. It supplements Art.8 of the Taxonomy Regulation, and specifies the content, methodology and presentation of the information to be disclosed by both financial and non-financial undertakings. It helps companies who are subject to disclosure requirements under Art.8 of the Taxonomy Regulation, to translate technical screening criteria into Key Performances Indices with regard to turnover, capital expenditure and operating expenditure. Disclosure requirements are laid down in the annexes of the delegated act, and they may differ depending on the nature of the entity (financial, non-financial undertakings), between financial entities (asset managers, credit institutions, investment firms, insurance and reinsurance companies).

=== Complementary Climate Delegated Act ===
The Complementary Climate Delegated Act was approved in principle by the Commission in February 2022, and formally adopted on 9 May 2022, when the language versions in all official EU languages were made available. It was then sent to the co-legislators for scrutiny, which ended on 11 July 2022 without any objections. The Complementary Delegated Act was published in the Official Journal on 15 July 2022 and it will apply as from 1 January 2023. It's the most controversial of the delegated acts and has reignited the debate about the inclusion of nuclear energy and natural gas in the taxonomy. In the delegated act, certain activities in the gas and nuclear sector are included in the taxonomy as transitional activities substantially contributing to climate change mitigation. The inclusion of such activities follows the publication of two reports, one from the TEG in 2019 and the second from the Joint Research Committee (JRC), in 2021, as well as consultations with the PSF and the Member States Expert Group, that led to different conclusions. A vote to reject this Act in the EP failed to obtain the required majority.

=== Environmental Delegated Act ===
The Environmental Delegated Act covering the 4 remaining environmental objectives in the EU Taxonomy was formally published in the Official Journal of the European Union on 21 November 2023. Essentially, it outlines Technical Screening Criteria for selected economic activities under the following objectives: I) Sustainable use and protection of water and marine resources; II) Transition to a circular economy; III) Pollution prevention and control; and IV) Protection and restoration of biodiversity and ecosystems. This particular delegated act started applying as of 1 January 2024.

== Applicability for banks ==
The applicability of the taxonomy for commercial banks is being specified by the European Banking Authority (EBA). In March 2021, the EBA proposed to oblige banks to disclose a "green asset ratio" and other KPIs, effective as of 2024. Banks' taxonomy disclosure have been integrated into "Pillar 3" disclosure requirements. Banks will also have to disclose energy efficiency indicators on their mortgage portfolios.

According to early estimates, EU banks had an average green asset ratio of 2.23%.

== Debate over natural gas and nuclear energy ==
=== Within the expert groups ===
The classifications of fossil gas and nuclear energy are controversial. The debate about the inclusion of certain nuclear and gas activities in the green taxonomy was complemented by two reports that preceded the Complementary Climate Delegated Act: one from the Technical Expert Group (TEG), mostly including institutions from the finance sector, and one from the Joint Research Centre, whose role is to provide independent scientific advice to EU policy and which conducts research on nuclear safety and security for Euratom. In the technical annex of its report, the TEG concluded that nuclear energy could contribute to the objective of climate change mitigation but recommended not to include it in the taxonomy at that stage, for the difficulties in reaching a conclusion in respect of the compliance of nuclear energy with the principle of "do no significant harm".

On the other hand, the report published by the JRC concluded that, with currently available technologies and under the current regulatory framework, the impact of nuclear energy would remain below harmful levels. The report was reviewed by a Commission Expert Group (the Member States' experts on radiation protection and waste management, the so-called "art.31 experts group") which assessed it positively, while the Scientific Committee on Health, Environmental and Emerging Risks (SCHEER) criticized the approach used to assess the compliance with the "do not significant harm" principle. The Platform on Sustainable Finance, which includes various interest groups, NGOs and international institutions, in a report published in January 2022 raised concerns about the inclusion of nuclear in the taxonomy, arguing that nuclear activities should not be considered taxonomy aligned as they fail to ensure compliance with the "do no significant harm" principle. Also, the PSF noted, the technical screening criteria applied to new nuclear power plants would cover installations receiving the construction permit by 2045. Therefore, it's possible that nuclear activities starting their operations too late would fail to comply also with the objective of substantially contributing to reducing climate change impacts, as the target of climate neutrality has to be achieved by 2050.

Regarding natural gas, in the same report the PSF suggested to maintain only the criteria setting a certain threshold for GHG emissions, leaving door open for some of the activities generating higher emissions to be considered as "intermediate transition"- even though still not sustainable - activities, but only under an additional extended taxonomy.

=== Member States ===
In 2015 gas constituted 22% of the energy mix of Europe and nuclear power 13,6%.

Natural gas is seen by some countries as the bridge between coal and renewable energy, and those countries argue for natural gas to be considered sustainable under a set of conditions. Germany in particular was a strong supporter towards its inclusion in the taxonomy, moreover advancing a request to the Commission to further ease environmental restrictions on its use. In a letter sent to the Commission, the Netherlands, Austria, Sweden and Denmark opposed the inclusion of gas.

Regarding nuclear power, concerns about safety and waste disposal had led to Spain, Belgium and Germany committing to abandoning nuclear power in the coming years, even though Belgium later pushed forward its nuclear phase-out by ten years following the Russian invasion of Ukraine. On the inclusion of nuclear power in the taxonomy, a group of four countries (Spain, Denmark, Austria and Luxembourg) has co-signed an open letter to criticize the inclusion project of the Commission. Austria and Luxembourg have even threatened to sue the Commission in the Court of Justice if it included the two power sources into the taxonomy, on the ground that it would weaken its credibility.

On the other hand, France is promoting the inclusion of nuclear power into the taxonomy, supported by Bulgaria, Croatia, Czechia, Finland, Hungary, Poland, Romania, Slovakia and Slovenia. The economy and energy minister of these countries published a joint opinion article on 11 October 2021 to defend the role of nuclear power in the fight against climate change. Moreover, they support that it would lead to a better control on the energy prices, as nuclear power price is more stable than the power of gas which is mainly imported. Furthermore, a joint letter to the Commission from Finland and Sweden asked to remove the deadline for investment in nuclear energy and criticized the stringent criteria for waste disposal, which in their view fail to account the advances achieved in the two countries.

=== Private stakeholders ===
FORATOM, representing the European nuclear industry, welcomed the inclusion of nuclear activities in the Taxonomy, arguing at the same time that it shouldn't be considered just as a transitional activity, and pushed for nuclear to be part of the EU energy mix beyond 2050. EUROGAS, the association representing European gas sector, in its response to the call for feedback following the first TEG report in August 2019, emphasised the crucial role of investments in gas infrastructures in order to contribute to the energy transition. For this reason, they pushed for investments in gas infrastructures to be labelled as sustainable activities under the EU Taxonomy.

=== Vote in the European Parliament ===
The compromise between gas and nuclear has been eased by the fact that the Commission opted for the inclusion of the two controversial energy sources in the taxonomy in one single delegated act, implying that Member States and European Parliament can either refuse the whole proposition or adopt it. That led the commission to officially propose the inclusion of both nuclear and gas into the Taxonomy in February 2022.

On 6 July 2022 the European Parliament voted against a resolution to reject the Third Delegated Act regarding the inclusion of nuclear power and natural gas in the taxonomy. 278 MEPs voted in favour when an absolute majority of 353 was required.
