= Panda bonds =

Foreign bond issued in China

- Traditional Chinese: 熊貓債券
- Simplified Chinese: 熊猫债券
Transcriptions
Standard Mandarin
- Hanyu Pinyin: Xióngmāo Zhàiquàn

A Panda bond is a Chinese renminbi-denominated bond from a non-Chinese issuer, sold in the People's Republic of China. Unlike the dim sum bond, Panda bonds are issued in the onshore market for onshore renminbi.

== History ==
The first two Panda bonds were issued in October 2005 on the same day by the International Finance Corporation and the Asian Development Bank. Their terms were 1.13 billion yuan of 10-year bonds at a 3.4% yield and 1 billion yuan of 10-year bonds at a 3.34% yield. The Chinese government had been negotiating for several years about implementation details before permitting the sale of such bonds; they had been concerned about the possible effects on their currency peg. Eventually, it was agreed that funds raised from sales of Panda bonds would have to remain in China; issuers would not be permitted to repatriate such funds.

In May 2010, rules were liberalised and more issuers were allowed, with the restriction on proceeds not being remitted abroad lifted.

In June 2016, Bank of China has signed a Memorandum of Understanding on panda bonds issuance with Poland's Ministry of Finance, making Poland the first European sovereign government to issue such bonds.

In March 2018, the Philippines issued its inaugural Panda bonds, thereby becoming the first Association of Southeast Asian Nations member to do so. The Bureau of the Treasury stated that regulatory approvals are the only remaining hurdle for the issuance of three-year and five-year panda bonds.

In July 2026, Indonesia announced plans to issue its first panda bonds, targeting 7 billion yuan (approximately US$1 billion) through three- and five-year tranches. The sale was scheduled for 23 July, with the Bank of China acting as lead underwriter and lead bookrunner.

== See also ==
- Economy of China
- Chinese financial system
- Banking in China
- List of foreign currency bonds
