= Dim sum bond =

Eurobond in Chinese renminbi

Dim sum bonds are bonds issued outside of Mainland China but denominated in Chinese renminbi, rather than the local currency. Dim sum bonds are predominantly issued in Hong Kong, and are named after dim sum, a popular style of cuisine in southern China. They are a type of eurobond.

Unlike panda bonds, dim sum bonds are issued in the offshore market for offshore RMB.

== History and use ==
The first dim sum bond was issued by the China Development Bank in July 2007. Until July 2010, only Chinese and Hong Kong banks could issue renminbi-denominated bonds; deregulation led to the development of an offshore renminbi market and the internationalization of dim sum bonds. The bonds became more popular as foreign companies sought yuan-denominated assets as the renminbi appreciated in 2011. Although the major market for dim sum bonds is Hong Kong, China Construction Bank became the first Chinese bank to issue a renminbi-denominated bond in London in November 2012. This followed similar issues by non-Chinese banks like ANZ, HSBC and Banco do Brasil earlier in the year.

35.7 billion yuan in dim sum bonds were issued in 2010 and 131 billion in 2011.

The first foreign-issued dim sum bond by a nonfinancial company was announced on August 19, 2010, and issued on September 16, 2010, by McDonald's. On 5 November 2013, British Columbia finance minister Mike de Jong reported a successful placement of Chinese RMB 2.5 billion in dim sum bonds, listed January 14, 2014, on the Luxembourg Stock Exchange. The issue was five times oversubscribed.

Some Indian companies participate in the dim sum bond market, including IL & FS Transportation Networks (a subsidiary of the giant lender IL & FS Financial Services).

In October 2025, the Indonesian government issued 6 billion renminbi of dim sum sovereign bonds.

== See also ==
- Foreign currency denominated bond
- Panda bond
- Kungfu bond
- Eurobond
- Schengen bond
