= Baklava bond =

Turkish financial document

A Baklava bond is a financial bond denominated in Turkish lira and issued by a domestic or foreign entity in Turkey. The name refers to baklava, a Turkish dessert.

In October 2010, Turkish authorities allowed companies to issue bonds.
