= Dual Currency Bond =

Dual currency bonds are the bonds for which money is raised in one currency, but redemption takes place in another. In a dual currency bond, the principal and coupon rate are denominated in two different currencies.

== History ==
Low interest rates during 1995 and 1996 led to a surge in issuance of dual currency bonds that was driven primarily by Japanese investors seeking income opportunities that were not available domestically. Dual currency bond were among the earliest and most successful currency linked fixed income securities and remained popular thereafter. The securities were introduced on a private placement basis in the late 1980s, with Japanese insurers acting as capital providers to United States and European issuers.

Future British cabinet member Sajid Javid helped create at Chase Manhattan Bank a dual currency bond for Mexico after the Tequila Crisis of 1994.

== Features ==
=== Coupon ===
The coupon is the return the issuer pays to the bondholder. For example, assume that the interest rate of Swiss Franc (CHF) currency is lower than United States Dollar (USD). Generally, the principal will be a higher interest rate currency (USD) and the coupon will be the lower interest rate currency (CHF).

=== Option ===
The bondholder may choose the higher exchange rate of the dual currency bond over the lower exchange rate currency bond.

=== Swap ===
The issuer and bondholder can switch positions. The bondholder compensates the issuer by reducing the cost of fund.

== See also ==
- Interest rate
