= Grupo Financiero Galicia =

Argentine bank

Coordinates: 34°36′21″S 58°22′21″W

Grupo Financiero Galícia S.A.

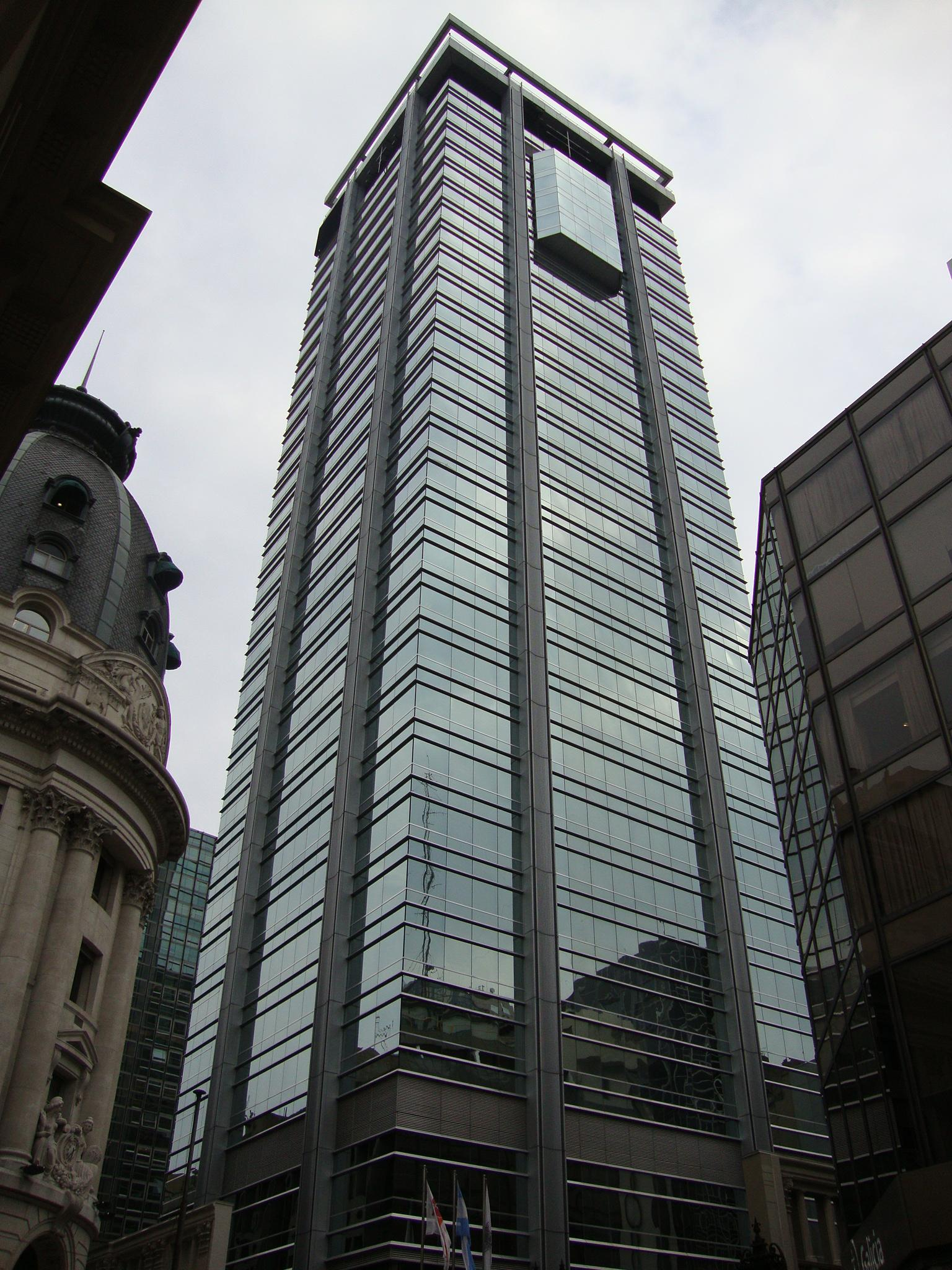
- GFG headquarters in Buenos Aires
- Type: Public
- Traded as: BCBA: GGAL; Nasdaq: GGAL; MERVAL component
- Industry: Financial services
- Founded: 1905; 121 years ago
- Headquarters: Buenos Aires, Argentina
- Key people: Antonio R. Garcés, (chairman & CEO)
- Products: Retail Banking; Offshore banking Insurance; Investments; Mortgages; Consumer Finance; Credit cards Warehousing
- Revenue: ▲US$1.6 billion (2012)
- Net income: ▲US$272.1 million (2012)
- Total assets: ▲US$ 12.9 billion (2012)
- Number of employees: 5,591
- Subsidiaries: Naranja X
- Website: gfgsa.com

Grupo Financiero Galicia S.A. is a financial services holding company based in Buenos Aires, and its banking operations are the fifth largest in Argentina, as well as the largest among all domestically owned private banks in the country.

== Overview ==
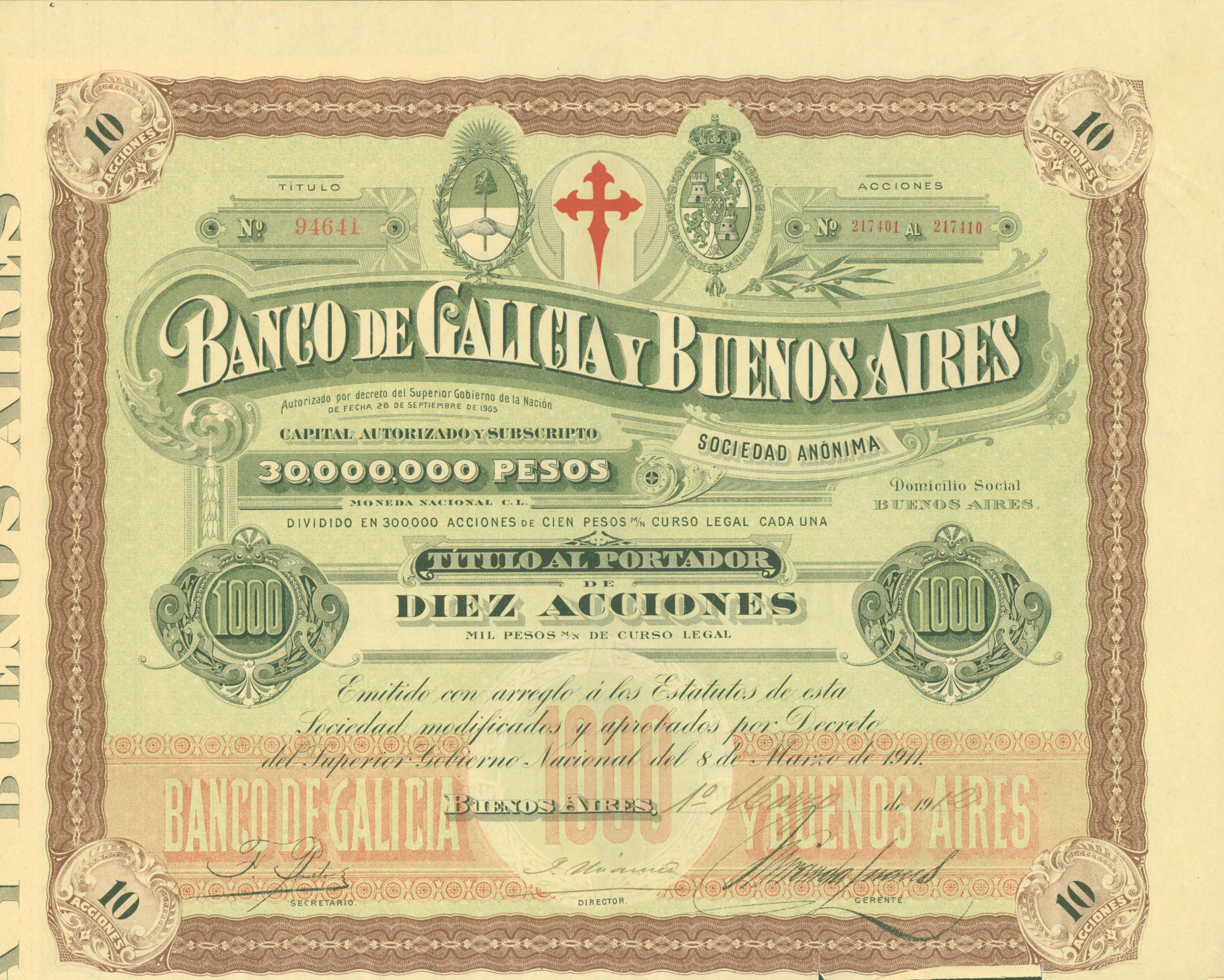
Share of the Banco de Galicia y Buenos Aires, issued 8 March 1911

The bank was founded in 1905 as the Banco de Galicia y Buenos Aires by a consortium led by Manuel Escasany, a jeweler and clockmaker of Galician origin. It was registered under the laws of the Argentine Republic. Its executive offices are located in Buenos Aires. The name referred to the Galician heritage of the Escasanys, the largest original shareholders, as well as to the Spanish Argentine immigrant community from that region (who were second only to Italian Argentines in number).

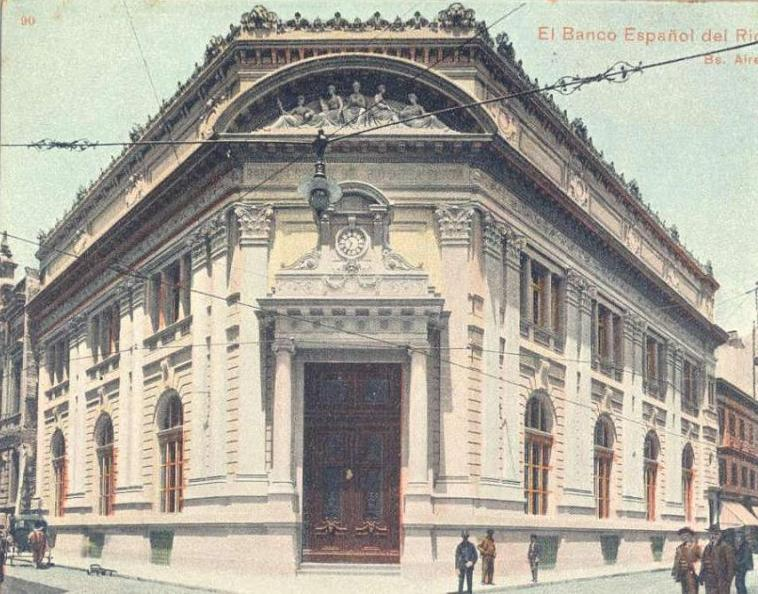
The original headquarters in downtown Buenos Aires

The bank maintained over 2,500 accounts by the end of its first year, and in 1907, it was listed on the Buenos Aires Stock Exchange and garnered nearly 3,300 initial shareholders. The Buenos Aires branches were followed by one in neighboring Montevideo, Uruguay, in 1910, and in 1921, it began offering time deposits (which remain the most common form of savings among the Argentine public).

Following the founder's death in 1948, his son, Eduardo Escasany, became its president and by 1960, he had secured a partnership with the Ayerzas and the Brauns, two influential local families prominent in the Argentine ranching and retail sectors, respectively. The Banco de Galicia became the largest, domestically owned private bank in Argentina in 1965 and by 1975, ranked second to the public National Mortgage Bank in new home loans, and employed around 3,900 staff in 93 branches, nationwide. Banco de Galicia in 1993 became the first Latin American bank to enter both the U.S. and European stock markets, and the first to raise funds on the U.S. domestic capital market by floating a $200 million, ten-year Yankee bond. The following year it was the first to issue convertible bonds on the international securities market, enabling the bank to remain in Argentine hands at a time when many of its rivals were sold to Spanish banks. A branch was opened in New York in 1994, and the group acquired a one-eighth share in the newly privatized postal service. Banco Galicia established an insurance company, Sudamericana Holding S.A., in 1996 as a joint venture with The Hartford.

The company's decision in 2000 to demolish its historic downtown Buenos Aires headquarters in favor of a modern, 34-story building was controversial. A family feud among the Escasany siblings led to the establishment in 2000 of the Banco de Galicia Foundation, which owns over 94% of the outstanding shares of Banco Galicia. Though a sell-off of public shares was averted, given the controversy, the 1998–2002 Argentine great depression led to the loss of nearly half of the bank's deposits between 2001 and 2002, and to its near-insolvency, when its dollar-denominated debt of US$1.8 billion required borrowing on flexible terms from the Central Bank of Argentina; Escasany, who had also been chairman of the Argentine Banking Association, resigned as CEO in 2002. The bank recovered during 2003, however, when its losses of US$436 million were trimmed to US$73 million, and it has remained profitable in the ensuing years.

The bank remains the largest private sector commercial bank in Argentina ranked by deposits, assets or loans. As of April 2009, the group maintained 236 branches and total deposits in Argentina amounted to nearly US$4.5 billion, a 6% market share, and 7.6% among private sector depositors. Consolidated assets totaled US$7.7 billion and loans to the private sector, US$3.7 billion (6.5% of the market).

Besides its holdings in Banco Galicia, GFG participates in other business sectors through four companies: Grupo Sudamericana, an insurance holding company specialized in life, retirement, and hemeowner's policies; Galicia Warrants S.A., a warehouse rental services and issuer of certificate of deposits company; Net Investment, a holding company oriented to invest in Internet projects that can have synergies with Banco Galicia; and Galval Agente de Valores S.A., a wholly owned subsidiary of GFG, based in Uruguay and created with the purpose of providing custody services.

Grupo Galicia Class B shares trade on the Córdoba Stock Exchange while Grupo Galicia ADSs trade on the Nasdaq Capital Market, both under the ticker symbol "GGAL." Grupo Galicia comprises the Buenos Aires Stock Exchange's blue-chip MERVAL Index and are included in the Morgan Stanley Capital International and Standard & Poor's indices, as well.

In 2020, Grupo Financiero Galicia introduced its first digital wallet that integrates the most important banks in Argentina in a single app.

== Shareholders and investors ==
The capital structure of the Group consists of 1,474,692,091 shares, divided into Class A and Class B shares. The 281,221,650 Class A shares carry five votes each, while the remaining Class B shares grant one vote per share. Traded under the symbol GGAL, the Class B shares are listed on BYMA, MAE, and the Córdoba Stock Exchange, with one ADS equivalent to ten Class B shares.

The controlling stake is held by EBA Holding, which owns 19.7% of the shares but commands 55.1% of the voting power due to its multiple-voting Class A shares. EBA Holding is entirely owned by the Escasany, Ayerza, and Braun families—the Escasanys being the founders of Galicia Bank in 1905, while the Ayerza and Braun families joined in the mid-20th century.
