= Henry's (electronics retailer) =

Canadian consumer electronics store chain

Henry's Enterprise Inc.
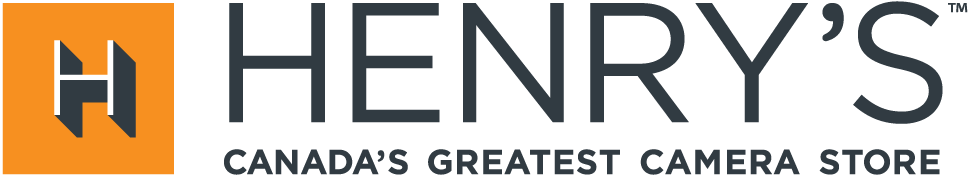
- Type: Private
- Industry: Consumer electronics; Retail
- Founded: 1909
- Founder: Harry Himelstein
- Headquarters: 350 Creditstone Road, Concord L4K 3Z2 Canada
- Number of locations: 20
- Area served: Canada
- Services: 1. Camera & Gear Sales and Service; 2. Trade-In and Used Products; 3. Photo-Finishing; 4. Passport Photos; 5. Workshops & Photowalks; 6. Photo Gifts and Prints
- Number of employees: 300
- Parent: Lynx Equity Ltd
- Website: www.henrys.com

Henry's Camera is a Canadian electronics retailer that sells photography, video and related technology based products that is headquartered in Toronto, Ontario. The business first opened its doors in Toronto in 1909. Henry's is a source for products, advice and customer service in camera-related hardware and accessories for photography, videography and online content creation. Henry's has several locations across Canada and a B2B and e-commerce business. Henry's carries over 15,000 imaging-related products from all of the top brands.

== History ==
=== 1909–1932 ===
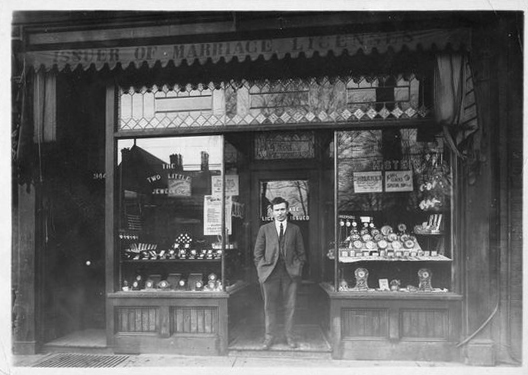
A close up of Harry Stein (founder of Henry & Company, later Henry's) in front of his first store in Toronto, Ontario.

Henry's was established in 1909 by Harry Himelstein, a Russian laborer on the Trans-Siberian Railway - turned watchmaker - who immigrated to Canada in 1906 at the age of 16. Upon his arrival in Toronto, he shortened his name to become Harry Stein. As a watchmaker, Stein got started in the watch and jewellery business in Toronto and started Henry's & Company in 1909 at the age of 19. The store was given the name Henry, as Stein was not fond of his name, Harry. The first store was located on Yonge Street in what was then the heart of the business district of the growing city of Toronto.

In 1916, Stein moved the jewelry business to a new location at 558 Queen Street West, where it would remain until 1921.

In 1932, sensing a shift in the business culture of the city that was still known to many as Hogtown, Stein decided to move closer to what he considered the city core and relocated to 63 Queen Street West.

=== 1940–1959 ===
In the early 1940s, Gerald Stein, son of Harry, joined his father in the jewelry business. Henry & Company moved to 113 Queen Street West, the first time the Steins were owners of their own building.

From 1945 until 1958 the store was run by father and son, and sold both new and second-hand watches and jewellery.

=== 1959–1971 ===
In 1958, Gerald and Adele Stein bought out Harry and became the owners of Henry & Company, a business that was just entering its second half century.

In the late 1950s, the Japanese consumer electronics industry emerged and in 1959, the Steins added photographic equipment and supplies to their store. They started with four rolls of 8 mm movie film and sold out their minimal stock in the first day. By 1964 sales were split approximately 50% photo and 50% jewellery and second-hand goods.

In 1964, Gerald and Adele Stein moved Henry & Company to a new location at 135 Church Street, just north of Queen. Over several years, Gerald and Adele concentrated more and more on photographic goods and began to move away from second-hand goods and jewellery.

In 1971, Gerald decided to sell the business to a group of five limited companies.

=== 1971–1982 ===
With new ownership came an immediate change in the format of the store at 135 Church Street and Henry & Company became solely focused on photographic equipment and supplies. It was then that the store started to attract seasoned sales people.

Between 1971 and 1974, business was booming and the company purchased a 16,000 sq ft building on Church Street. The decision was made to change the corporate name from Henry & Company to the more modern-sounding Henry's, with a new orange logo to give the store a distinctive identity. Henry's has remained at 119 Church Street from 1974 until today, and this location remains the flagship of the chain.

In 1977, Henry's opened a wholesale division, called Targit, which imported and distributed photographic goods. The photo business was booming at this time due to the popularity and affordability of the single-lens reflex camera.

Henry's had six retail stores by the early 1980s, and had expanded into the photofinishing field by making an acquisition of a company called Photo King. Due to the deepening recession and skyrocketing interest rates of the 80s, Henry's went into receivership on November 15, 1982.

=== 1982–2002 ===
One of the partners in the defunct company, Andrew Stein, grandson of Harry, felt that there was still value in the company because its name and reputation were well known across Canada and throughout the industry. Andrew's offer to buy back the company was accepted on February 11, 1983. Henry's was again in the hands of the Stein family. Andrew and his wife, Gaye, founded Cranbrook Glen Enterprises Limited, which became the sole owner of Henry's.

From 1983 to 1992, Henry's remained a one-store operation. In 1985, the Steins repurchased the property at 119 Church Street. Several companies, such as Toronto Camera, Queen Street Camera, Classic Camera and others were also purchased by Henry's during this time. In 1992 Steeles Camera in the north end of the city was purchased by Henry's. In 1997, Henry's acquired Oshawa Camera and also opened a location in Mississauga that same year. In 1997 Henry's launched its website and in 1999 launched an eBay presence which closed in 2018.

=== 2003–2023 ===
In 2003, the company expanded once again into new markets, opening stores in Ottawa and London, and opened its first store outside the province of Ontario in Winnipeg in 2008.

In 2015, Gillian Stein, daughter of Andrew Stein, became CEO of Henrys.

In 2018–2019 Henry's opened four retail locations in British Columbia and acquired the Quebec retailer Lozeau, establishing the company as a coast-to-coast national retailer. In May 2020, three of the British Columbia locations closed due to underperformance.

On May 1, 2020, Henry's owners Cranbrook Glen Enterprises announced that it would be seeking protection from creditors as it filed a Notice of Intention to Make a Proposal under the Bankruptcy and Insolvency Act. Henry's announced that it would be closing 7 stores as a result.

In July 2020, Henry's announced that their strategic restructuring to improve efficiencies across the business and ensure future profitability in a post-pandemic world had been successfully completed. The Stein family, who has owned Henry's for four generations, continue to maintain ownership as Henry's Enterprises Inc. The acquisition and change from Cranbrook Glen Enterprises Ltd. to Henry's Enterprises Inc. saw all executive management and the CEO remain in place and they continue to operate and manage the Henry's retail brand & associated businesses.

In June 2023, Henry's announced that they were acquired by Lynx Equity Limited, a Toronto-based equity firm. Much of the executive staff has remained after the acquisition.

== Locations ==
Henry's operates a chain of 20 locations across Canada plus an e-commerce and commercial business.
