= Yankee Bond =

Foreign bond issued in the United States

A Yankee bond is a bond issued by a foreign entity, such as a bank or company, that is issued and traded in the United States and denominated in U.S. dollars. For instance, Company ABC is headquartered in France. If ABC issues dollar bonds in the United States, the bonds are Yankee bonds. Yankee bonds are normally issued in tranches, a debt structure that divides the investment into portions. Typically each portion has a different level of risk, interest rates, and maturities. Investors buy Yankee bonds to access overseas firms. Yankee bonds are like other bonds, and the borrower pays interest and principal as usual. Yankee bonds are administered by the Securities Act of 1933. Issuers register Yankee bonds with the Securities and Exchange Commission (SEC) before offering them for sale.

== Risk ==
Because they are dollar bonds, investors avoid price fluctuations created by exchange rate changes. Instead, the issuer takes on exchange risks. If a foreign company faces domestic interest rates that are higher than the comparable bond rates in the United States, companies experience lower costs.

According to Bell (2011), higher credit risks imply higher yields. Yankee bonds frequently offer yields higher than the yields available on comparable, or even lower-rated bond issues from U.S. issuers.

== Reverse Yankee bond ==
In 2003, reverse Yankee bonds emerged. They are mostly of a higher grade and are issued by a U.S. company outside the U.S., and denominated in a currency other than the dollar. This bond is governed by Securities Act of 1933, and must be registered with the SEC.

U.S. companies issued €45 billion of euro-denominated bonds in the first seven months of 2015 by taking advantage of the euro's low pricing relative to dollars and Europe’s increasing accessibility to international borrowers. Globalisation and currency volatility support this market, in part as a diversification move. US bonds yields were well over those in the Euro zone. U.S. backers represented 23% of all euro-designated bond issues in 2016.

== See also ==
- List of foreign currency bonds
- Eurobond (external bond) (bond issued that is denominated in a currency not native to the country where it is issued)
