= Formosa bond =

Bond of Taiwan

- Traditional Chinese: 福爾摩莎債券
- Simplified Chinese: 福尔摩莎债券
Transcriptions
Standard Mandarin
- Hanyu Pinyin: Fú'ěrmóshā Zhàiquàn
- Wade–Giles: Fu²-êrh³-mo²-sha¹ Chai⁴-ch′üan⁴
Hakka
- Pha̍k-fa-sṳ: Fuk-ngì-mô-sâ Chai-khién
Southern Min
- Hokkien POJ: Hok-ní-mô͘-sá Chè-kǹg
- Tâi-lô: Hok-ní-môo-sá Tsè-kǹg

A Formosa bond (Chinese: 福爾摩莎債券; Pe̍h-ōe-jī: Hok-ní-mô͘-sá Chè-kǹg) is a bond issued in Taiwan but denominated in a currency other than the New Taiwan Dollar. They are issued by the Taiwan branches of publicly traded overseas financial institutions and to be traded must have a credit rating of BBB or higher.

== History ==
The major designer and promoter of the Formosa bond was Lee Shyan-yuan, a board member of Taiwan's market regulator, the Financial Supervisory Commission (FSC).

The name refers to Formosa, an alternative name for the island of Taiwan; it was chosen as the result of a contest held in September 2006 by the FSC. 15 names were suggested, intended to reflect special characteristics of Taiwan; two different Chinese-language versions of the name "Formosa bond" were suggested, as well as "C-Wang Bond" and "High-Tech Island Bond". Participants were also invited to suggest their own names for the bonds. The result of the contest was announced on 25 September 2006; "Formosa Bond" was the most popular choice, with 5,776 votes, or 57.16% of the total cast; the second-most popular choice, Taiwan 101 Bond, had only 1,229 votes, and the third-most popular choice, an alternative Chinese translation of "Formosa Bond", garnered only 618 votes.

== Trading ==
Bonds to be traded must have a credit rating of BBB or higher. Trading between securities firms has to be carried out through a subsystem of the GreTai Securities Market's Electronic Bond Trading System, for which trading hours are between 9:00 AM and 1:30 PM. However, Formosa bonds also listed on overseas exchanges may be traded over-the-counter between bond dealers.

The first Formosa bonds were part of a US$250 million carried out by Deutsche Bank in November 2006; BNP Paribas followed with an Australian dollar issuance, initially planned at A$500 million (US$386 million at then-current exchange rates) for February 2007, but later reduced to A$308 million (US$258 million) and delayed until 10 April 2007. HSBC were also said to be considering issuing such a bond, and BNP Paribas suggested that they might regularly issue Formosa Bonds.

Presently, only Taiwan branches of publicly traded overseas financial institutions are permitted to issue Formosa Bonds; the market regulator has floated the idea of extending this permission to other branches and subsidiaries of such institutions as well.

== See also ==
- Foreign currency denominated bond
- Eurobond
