= Kimchi bond =

South Korean non-won-denominated bond

- Hangul: 김치본드; 김치채권
- Hanja: (none); 김치債券
- RR: gimchi bondeu; gimchi chaegwon
- MR: kimch'i pondŭ; kimch'i ch'aekwŏn

A Kimchi bond is a non-won-denominated financial bond issued in the South Korean market. The name refers to kimchi, a Korean side dish. Woori Bank, which is credited with coining the term, defines it as solely referring to bonds from foreign issuers, a definition echoed by the Ministry of Finance and Economy. However, in practice, the term is also used to refer to non-won-denominated bond issuance by domestic entities. Deutsche Bank credits itself as having executed the first kimchi bond transaction, a US$100 million two-year floating rate note sold by South Korean company SK Global, but the first foreign company to sell non-won-denominated bonds in the South Korean market was Bear Stearns. Although foreign firms had long been permitted to issue won-denominated bonds, typically referred to as Arirang bonds, permission for them to issue foreign currency-denominated bonds was slower in coming. Permission was finally granted due to the strength of the won in 2005.
