= List of companies of Mongolia =

Location of Mongolia

Mongolia is a landlocked unitary sovereign state in East Asia. Economic activity in Mongolia has traditionally been based on herding and agriculture, although development of extensive mineral deposits of copper, coal, molybdenum, tin, tungsten, and gold have emerged as a driver of industrial production. Besides mining (21.8% of GDP) and agriculture (16% of GDP), dominant industries in the composition of GDP are wholesale and retail trade and service, transportation and storage, and real estate activities. The grey economy is estimated to be at least one-third the size of the official economy. As of 2006, 68.4% of Mongolia's exports went to the PRC, and the PRC supplied 29.8% of Mongolia's imports.

For further information on the types of business entities in this country and their abbreviations, see "Business entities in Mongolia".

== Notable firms ==
This list includes notable companies with primary headquarters located in the country. The industry and sector follow the Industry Classification Benchmark taxonomy. Organizations which have ceased operations are included and noted as defunct.

Notable companies Status: P=Private, S=State; A=Active, D=Defunct
Name	Industry	Sector	Headquarters	Founded	Notes	Status	
Aero Mongolia	Consumer services	Airlines	Ulaanbaatar	2002	Domestic and regional airline	P	A
Bank of Mongolia	Financials	Banks	Ulaanbaatar	1991	National central bank	S	A
DDishTV	Telecommunications	Mobile telecommunications	Ulaanbaatar	2008	Satellite TV and communication	P	A
Eznis Airways	Consumer services	Airlines	Ulaanbaatar	2006	Airline, defunct 2014	P	D
G-Mobile	Telecommunications	Mobile telecommunications	Ulaanbaatar	2007	Mobile phone network	P	A
Golomt Bank	Financials	Banks	Ulaanbaatar	1995	Banking and financial services	P	A
Hunnu Air	Consumer services	Airlines	Ulaanbaatar	2011	International and domestic airline	P	A
MIAT Mongolian Airlines	Consumer services	Airlines	Ulaanbaatar	1956	International airline, national flag carrier	P	A
Mobicom Corporation	Telecommunications	Mobile telecommunications	Ulaanbaatar	1996	Mobile, part of KDDI (Japan)	P	A
Mongolian National Broadcaster	Consumer services	Broadcasting & entertainment	Ulaanbaatar	1931	National television network	S	A
Newcom Group	Conglomerates	-	Ulaanbaatar	1993	Investment holding group	P	A
Skytel (Mongolia)	Telecommunications	Mobile telecommunications	Ulaanbaatar	1999	Mobile service provider	P	A
Tavan Bogd Group	Conglomerates	-	Ulaanbaatar	1995	Investment holding group	P	A
The State bank	Financials	Banks	Ulaanbaatar	2009	State-owned commercial bank, former Zoos bank	S	A
UFC Group	Consumer goods	Food products	Ulaanbaatar	1942	Food and beverage company	P	A
Unitel (Mongolia)	Telecommunications	Mobile telecommunications	Ulaanbaatar	2005	Mobile	P	A
XacBank	Financials	Banks	Ulaanbaatar	2001	Community development bank	P	A
Zoos Bank	Financials	Banks	Ulaanbaatar	1999	Commercial bank, defunct 2009, now The State bank	P	D

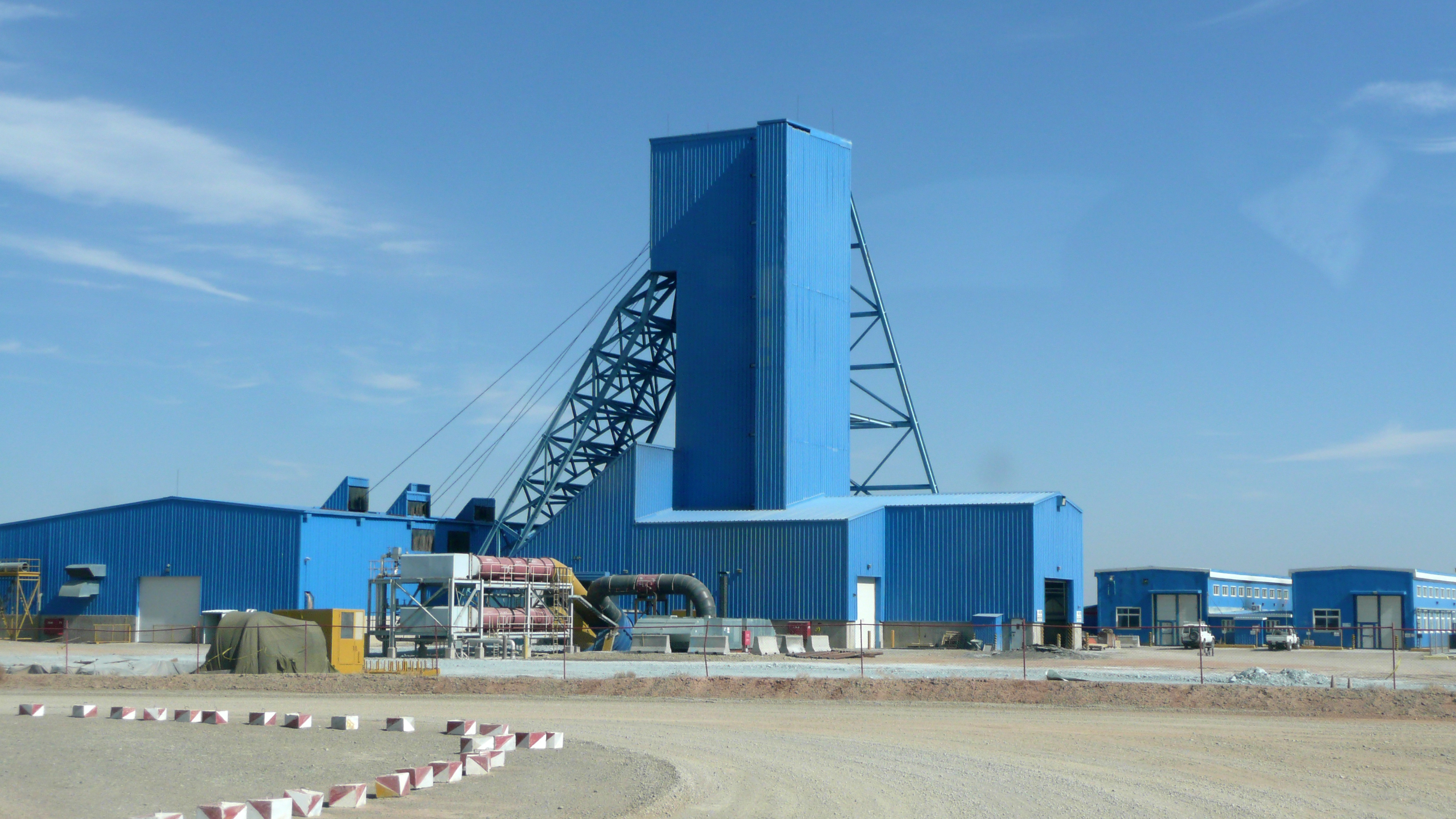
The Oyu Tolgoi mine employs 18,000 workers.

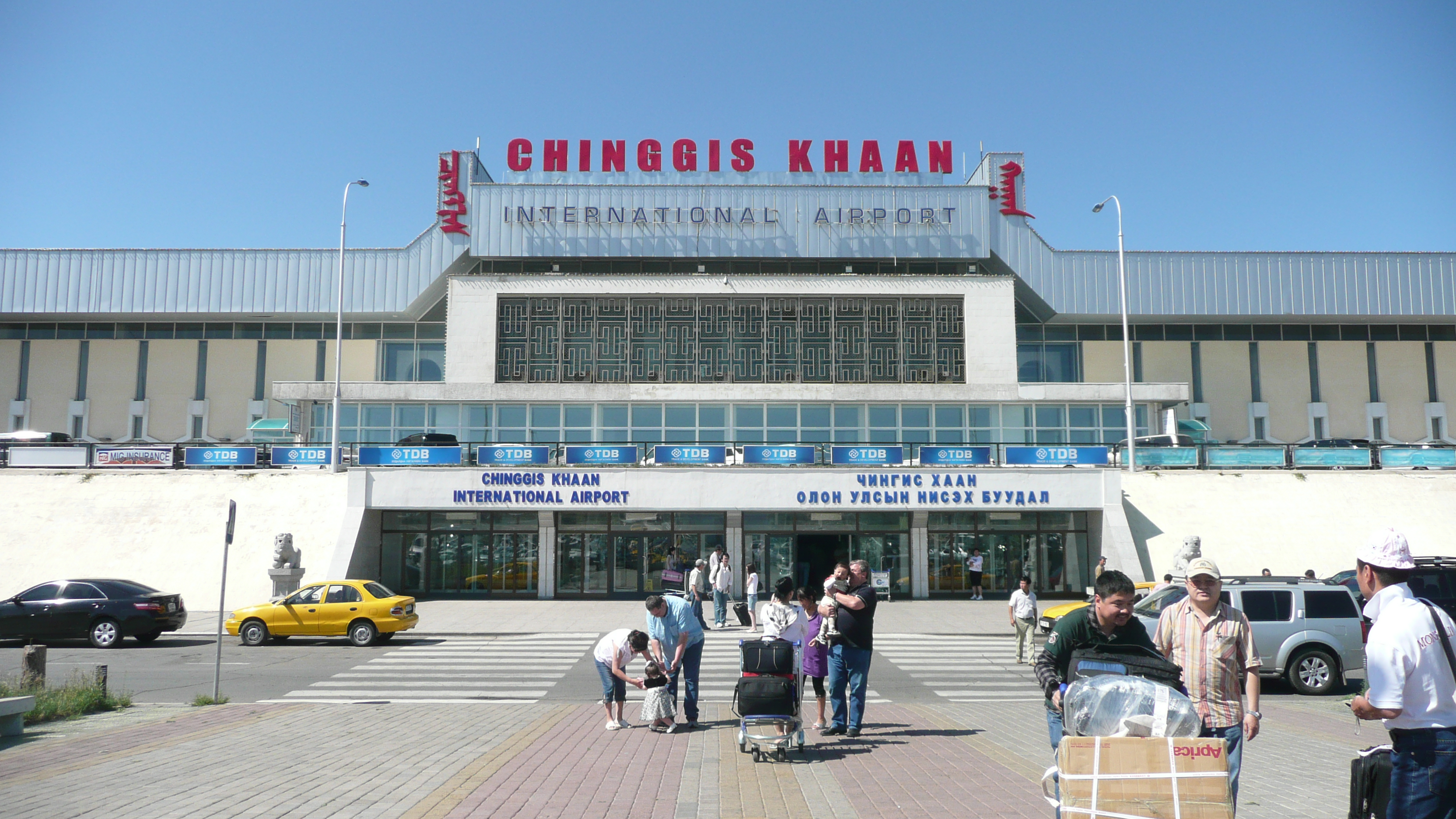
Buyant-Ukhaa International Airport in Ulaanbaatar.

== See also ==
- List of companies listed on the Mongolian Stock Exchange
