= List of banks in Mongolia =

The list of banks in Mongolia includes:

Assets of banks in Mongolia are highly concentrated (100% of assets held by five or fewer banks).

== Central bank ==
- Bank of Mongolia (Mongolbank)

== State-owned banks ==
Name	Abbv.	Established	Website
State Bank		23 November 2009	statebank.mn
Development Bank of Mongolia	DBM	2011	dbm.mn

== Commercial banks ==
As of 2023, Mongolia has 13 operational commercial banks.

Name	Abbv.	Established	Majority owner	Capital	Website
Trade and Development Bank	TDB	October 1990	Globull Investment & Development	(Mongolia)	tdbm.mn
Golomt Bank		6 March 1995	Golomt Financial Group	(Mongolia)	golomtbank.com
XacBank		2001	TenGer Financial Group	(Mongolia)	xacbank.mn
Khan Bank		1991	Sawada Holdings	(Japan)	khanbank.com
Capitron Bank		2001	Ajnai Corporation	(Mongolia)	capitronbank.mn
National Investment Bank of Mongolia	NIBank	2006	Dolgorsürengiin Dagvadorj	(Mongolia)	nibank.mn
Chinggis Khaan Bank	CKBank	2001	New Standard Finance	(Mongolia)	ckbank.mn
Credit Bank				(Mongolia)	creditbank.mn
Trans Bank		27 October 2016	P. Radnaabazar	(Mongolia)	transbank.mn
Arig Bank		1997	Nomin Holding	(Mongolia)	arigbank.mn
Bogd Bank		2014	Bodi Capital	(Mongolia)	bogdbank.com
M bank				(Mongolia)	https://m-bank.mn/
