= Khan Bank =

Major Mongolian bank

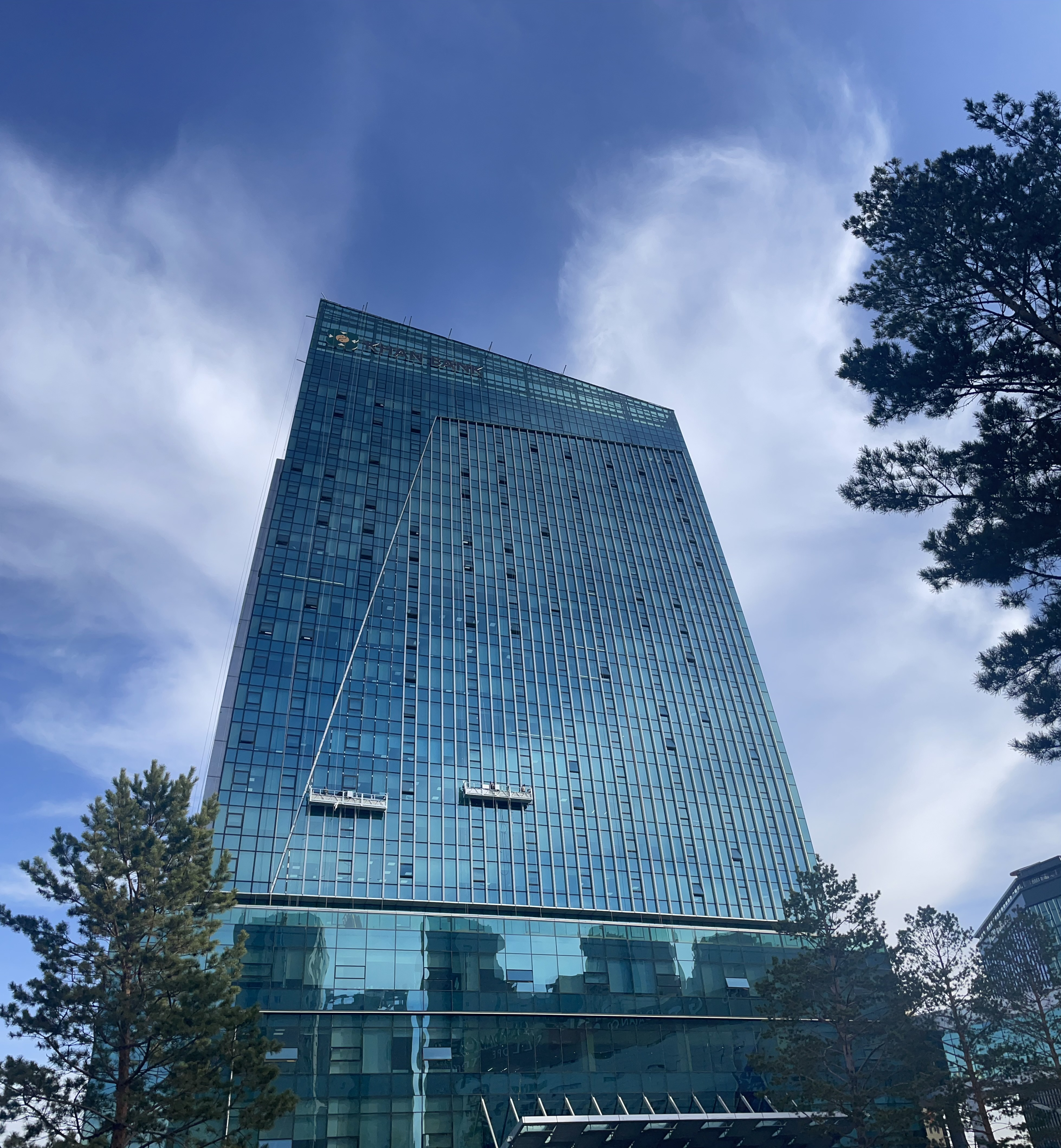
- Headquarter in Ulaanbaatar, 2025
- Native name: ХААН Банк
- Formerly: Agricultural Bank of Mongolia
- Type: Public company
- Industry: Financial services
- Founded: 1991; 35 years ago
- Headquarters: Ulaanbaatar, Mongolia
- Number of locations: 528 branches
- Area served: Mongolia
- Key people: Munkhtuya Rentsenbat (CEO)
- Products: Banking services
- Number of employees: 6,300 (2024)
- Website: www.khanbank.com

Khan Bank (Mongolian: ХААН Банк) is a Mongolian bank that is one of the major commercial banks in Mongolia. As of 2024, the bank had 528 branches and 335 ATMs throughout the country. The Bank has the largest total assets in Mongolia, making it a key player in Mongolian finance sector.

The bank is also one of the country's major providers of microfinance. It has a large focus on clients that are herdsman with solely movable assets.

== History ==
Khan Bank was established in 1991, during the dissolution of Mongolia’s single-tier state banking system, under the name Agricultural Cooperative Bank, with branch offices across the country. Later, the bank took over the assets and operations of state banks in rural areas and was subsequently privatized. However, its business activities continued to be strongly influenced by government involvement.

Khan Bank went into crisis in 1996-1999 as corruption and mismanagement impaired its liquidity and financial position and eventually lead to the Government of Mongolia and the Central Bank reinvested jointly in and privatizing the institution towards the 2000s.

In 2000, Agriculture Bank of Mongolia was staring at a potential failure but with a help from DAI Global and the World Bank's, Khan bank was able to do a complete turnaround. It would spread financial coverage to rural parts of Mongolia by expanding to 500 branches. By 2003, Khan Bank served over 80% of Mongolian households.

Khan Bank reaches 98 percent of rural communities, and massively expanded deposit, loan, and other service offerings to clients, including pensioners, nomadic herders, and small enterprises. For the price of a two-year, $2.5 million management contract, the United States Agency for International Development (USAID) turned Khan bank into a $125 million enterprise that has become fundamental to Mongolia's economic and social infrastructure.

Khan Bank considered an IPO in 2008, but because of the 2008 financial crisis, those plans were delayed.

As of 2008 the biggest 5 banks controlled 78.5% of total bank assets of Mongolia and the largest 3 holding 60.1% of total, one of them being Khan Bank. 2009 saw small GDP growth in Mongolia of only 0.5% which caused low money supply and impact on loan repayments. The banks performance was overly impacted as there was an increase in non-performing loans (NPLs). NPLs increased by as much as 50%.

In 2012, Mongolia faced immense economic growth which caused a liquidation issue in local banks, including Khan Bank, where banks sought foreign capital to satisfy the demand.

In 2023 Khan Bank earned the bank of the year award alongside banks from 130 countries around the world.

== Microfinance ==
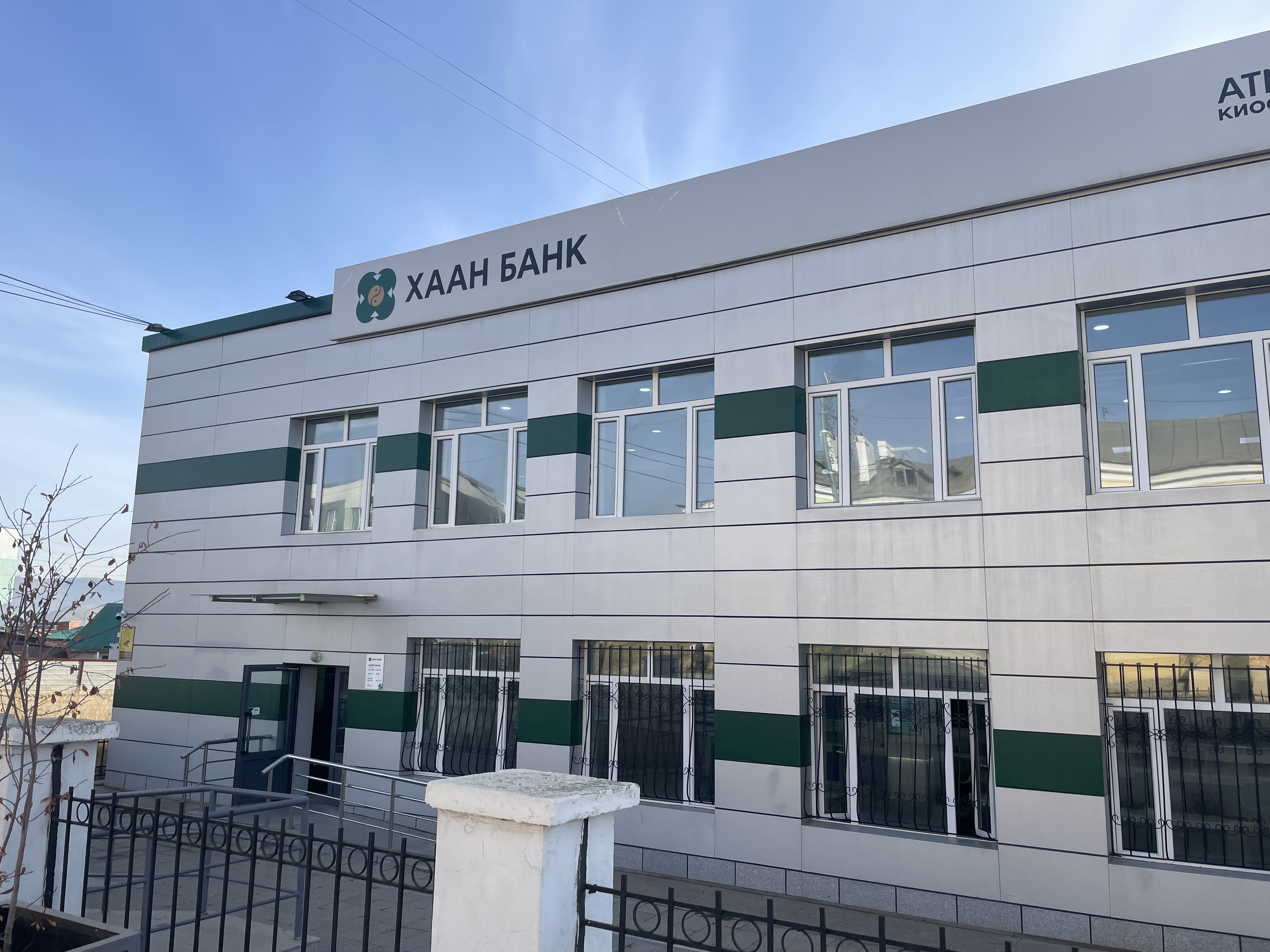
Khan Bank branch in Nalaikh, Mongolia

Khan bank together with XacBank are the two main banks that are involved in Micro-financing in Mongolia. Khan Bank is a large player in the Mongolian micro-financing programs with many of the rural communities depending on the loans and programs from the bank.

As of 2011, herders made up a significant portion of borrows and 2/3rd of the surveyed borrowers lived in a ger, a traditional Mongolian dwelling. Of the 15 commercial banks in Mongolia that are operating, only three banks, Khan, XacBank and Mongol Post banks have a wide network of rural branches.

Despite the borrowers mostly being herders, use of immovable as well as movable assets being used for loans has caused issues as herders can use livestock, gers, motorcycles and even their own relatives assets to secure loans further exasperating the inequality between Mongolia's urban wealth and rural settlements. Despite Khan Bank's involvement in rural areas, Khan Bank has three times the interest for loans compared with its competitors.

== Sustainability ==
MicroVest invested $10 million in Mongolia's first ever green bond to support the Mongolia's green developments. MicroVest, the asset management arm of DAI Capital, subscribed as the sole private institutional investor in a $60 million five-year bond, also supported by a $15 million contribution from the World Bank's International Finance Corporation (IFC) and $35 million from FMO, the Dutch development finance institution.

Asian Development Bank has worked with Khan Bank to further gender equality in Mongolia. Khan Bank has more than half of the employees are women and has a gender action committee to support women led households in Mongolia and reach women entrepreneurs and workers. There are trainings, financial literacy initiatives and targeted marketing for gender equality. Female employees make up 66% of the company and on average over 600 employees were on maternity leave during one year.

== See also ==
- Golomt Bank
- List of banks in Mongolia
- Trade and Development Bank of Mongolia
- XacBank
