= Byadrangiin Lkhagvasüren =

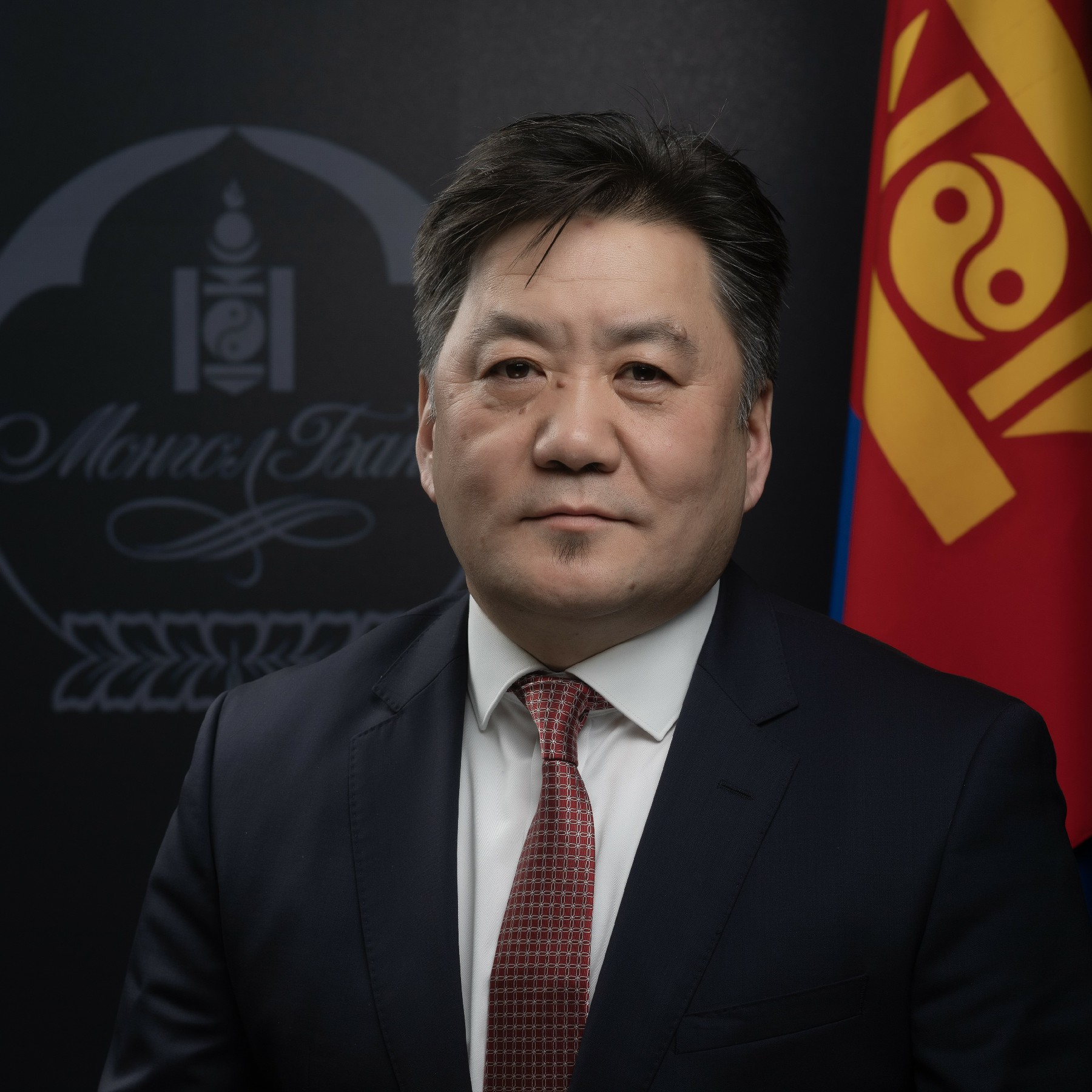
- Born: 1965 (age 60–61); Ulaanbaatar, Mongolia
- Occupations: Economist, archer

Byadrangiin Lkhagvasüren (born 1965) is a Mongolian archer and economist who served as the Governor of the Bank of Mongolia from 2019 to 2025.

== Education ==
Lkhagvasüren was born in Ulaanbaatar, Mongolia. In 1989 he earned his bachelor's degree in Economics at the National University of Mongolia and a master's degree in International Economics at Columbia University a year later.

== Career ==
Lkhagvasüren served as the Deputy Governor of the Bank of Mongolia between 2016 and 2019 before becoming the Governor of the institution in the following years.

In 2021, the Governor Byadrangiin Lkhagvasüren publicly announced that cryptcurrency is not ackknowledged as a legal tender in Mongolia.

In 2021, he was awarded Honored Economist of Mongolia.

=== Alleged Corruption ===
Lkhagvasüren was interrogated as part of the investigation of the Development Bank scandal.

Members of Lkhagvasüren's family have held, or come to hold, a number of prominent positions. His son, L.Temujin, allegedly serves as head of the Asset Management Department at the Development Bank of Mongolia and as a member of the board of directors of "DBM Asset Management" LLC, a subsidiary of the Development Bank. The husband of his sister, B. Usukhjargal — that is, his brother-in-law, P. Delgernaran — was appointed Chairman of the General Election Commission. In addition, his elder son, D. Bolor, is employed at the Ministry of Finance, and his younger son, D. Bayasgalan, at the Ministry of Foreign Affairs. D. Bolor has declared savings of 2.7 billion tögrög, and D. Bayasgalan savings of 3.7 billion tögrög. His brother, B. Lkhagvadorj, owns a number of buildings in central Ulaanbaatar, including the 13-story "Sun Road" building located east of the Central Police Department headquarters, the 13-story "Khan-Uul" building situated behind the Khan-Uul District Governor's Office, the "Royal Mountain" hotel, the "Home Plaza" building in front of the Sun Bridge, and the "Mazza" building opposite the Central Public Library — accumulating substantial property holdings across several generations of the family. The "Sun Road" building alone is reportedly leased to dozens of tenants, predominantly Chinese mining companies. Furthermore, "Deposit Insurance Corporation" LLC, a subsidiary of the Bank of Mongolia, leases office space in B. Lkhagvadorj's "Sun Road" building. In the current year alone, 633 million tögrög in budget funds have reportedly been paid to B. Lkhagvadorj in rent. S. Baatarsuren, executive director of the Deposit Insurance Corporation — the entity through which budget funds have been channeled as rental payments to the Governor's brother and paid his travel expenses— was promoted, only a few days prior, to executive director of the Development Bank of Mongolia.

=== Banknote printing controversy ===
In January 2026, a serious allegation has emerged that B. Lkhagvasuren, former Governor of the Bank of Mongolia (Mongolbank), illegally issued 50,000-tögrög banknotes and subsequently concealed the fact that this had been flagged by an internal audit. It has been alleged that approximately three trillion tögrög may have been printed in this manner — a sum equivalent to nearly 10 percent of Mongolia's state budget. Lkhagvasuren is reported to have told politicians, or stated within closed circles, that the notes had been issued "as commemorative items."

During his tenure as Governor, he reportedly repeated the claim that issuing 50,000- and 100,000-tögrög banknotes would have no adverse effects. Whether the banknotes already printed will be put into circulation or destroyed remains undecided. Because the State Great Khural has not adopted a resolution on the matter, the consequences of this alleged violation of the law remain unresolved. The Central Bank had incurred losses of nearly 10 trillion tögrög, noting that whereas it had operated with around 400 employees a few years earlier, its staff numbers had since increased further. Reports subsequently circulated that the Independent Authority Against Corruption (IAAC) had begun investigating former Bank of Mongolia Governor B. Lkhagvasuren. When asked to confirm these reports in January 2026, the IAAC stated that, as of that time, it had not yet begun an investigation into the former Governor.

== Professional experience ==
1989–1994: Researcher, Institute of Economics, Academy of Sciences

1994–1997: Economist/Senior Economist, Monetary Policy Department, Bank of Mongolia

1997–1998: Director General, Supervision Department, Bank of Mongolia

1999–2000: Consultant, Financial Sector for East Asia & Pacific Region, World Bank, Washington, D.C.

2000–2001: Advisor to the Governor, Bank of Mongolia

2001–2009: Director General, Accounting, Settlement and IT Department, Bank of Mongolia

2009–2013: Director General, Supervision Department, Bank of Mongolia

2013–2016: CEO, Deposit Insurance Corporation; Vice President, Mongolian Bankers’ Association

2016–2019: Deputy Governor, Bank of Mongolia

2019–2025: Governor, Bank of Mongolia

== Awards and Recognition ==
- 2021: Bloomberg Awards, Innovation of the Year
- 2021: Awarded the title of "Honored Economist of Mongolia" by the decree of the President of Mongolia
- 2023: Grand Bull Awards, Banking Reform
- 2023: Central Banking Institute, Fintech and Regtech Global Awards
- 2023: Mongolian National Olympic Committee, Golden Star Medal
- 2024: Global Finance, Central Banking Report Cards, “A-”
- 2025: National University of Mongolia Business School, Honorary Doctorate
- 2025: Global Finance, Central Banking Report Cards, “A-”
- 2025: Bloomberg TV Mongolia, Economic Catalyst Award

== Sports ==
Lkhagvasüren is an International Master in Archery, after winning over 30 medals in city and national tournaments. He also participated in several international competitions, including the Socialist Youth Friendship Archery Championship, the 2006 Doha Asian Games, the 2018 Asia Pacific Masters Games, and the 2025 World Masters Games, where he was awarded an individual bronze medal and a silver medal as part of a mixed team. Domestically, Lkhagvasüren regularly participated in the Mongolian National Championships for adults and youth, winning gold, silver, and bronze medals.

Lkhagvasüren takes part in the annual “BANKER” Archery Tournament, initiated by the Bank of Mongolia in 2018 for employees of the banking sector.

Results Banker Archery
Year	Individual medal	Mixed team medal
2019		Gold
2020		Gold
2021		Silver
2022	Gold	Bronze
2023		Gold
2024	Gold	Silver
2025		

In 2025, Lkhagvasüren successfully competed in the Interbank Archery Championship.
