= Byambasaikhan Bayanjargal =

Mongolian business executive

- Born: Ulaanbaatar, Mongolia
- Employer: NovaTerra LLC (2013 - present) Erdenes Mongol LLC (2015 - 2016) Newcom Group (2010 - 2013) Asian Development Bank (2004 - 2010)

Bayanjargal Byambasaikhan is a Mongolian business executive specialized in energy, infrastructure and mining investment and financing. He played leading roles in closing several of Asia's landmark project finance transactions. He is known as the clean energy pioneer in Mongolia having successfully developed and commissioned the country's first utility scale wind power project. This paved way for half a billion dollars of private sector investment in Mongolia’s renewables industry through 2019. Byambasaikhan's interests are in areas of energy, clean energy and regional infrastructure connectivity.

== Career ==
Byambasaikhan was with NovaTerra LLC, an investment and project management firm based in Ulaanbaatar. In 2015-2016, he was the CEO of Erdenes Mongol, Mongolia's sovereign wealth management company, where he chaired multiple mining company boards and was a board director of Oyu Tolgoi LLC, a world-class copper and gold mine managed by Rio Tinto.

In 2015, he was the Mongolian Government’s chief negotiator who ended a five-year dispute between the Government of Mongolia and Rio Tinto. This led to signing a $4.4 billion project finance deal with 20 leading banks to finance Oyu Tolgoi’s underground mine construction.

From 2010-2013, Byambasaikhan served as CEO of Clean Energy LLC and then was promoted to CEO and Managing Director of Newcom Group, a Mongolian clean technology and infrastructure investor, where he managed and closed the financing ($120 million) for the first wind farm, Salkhit / IPP in Mongolia with EBRD and FMO. He also chaired the board of Mobicom Corporation, the country's largest telecom and IT firm, a JV with Sumitomo and KDDI.

Byambasaikhan also chairs the Business Council of Mongolia, a business association of 260 international and national investors including GE, Rio Tinto, Engie and Sumitomo.

== Awards and honours ==
- In 2015, Oyu Tolgoi underground mine project finance transaction ($4.4 billion) was recognized as mining deal of the year by Project Finance International.
- He was recognized as a Young Global Leader by the World Economic Forum in 2014.
- Salkhit Wind Farm ($120 million) transaction was recognized as deal of the year by Project Finance International.
