= TDB =

TDB may refer to:

- Barycentric Dynamical Time (Temps Dynamique Barycentrique), a time standard
- The Daily Beast, a news site
- The Daily Buzz
- The Division Bell, a Pink Floyd album
- Trade and Development Bank, a multilateral African development financial institution
- Trade Development Bank, a former Geneva-based bank, now defunct
- Trade and Development Bank of Mongolia, one of the largest commercial bank from Mongolia
- Trivial Database, database engine
- United Nations Conference on Trade and Development (UNCTAD)'s Trade and Development Board
- TDB, An Australian HipHop Artist
