= Mongolia Economic Forum =

Organization based in Ulaanbaatar, Mongolia

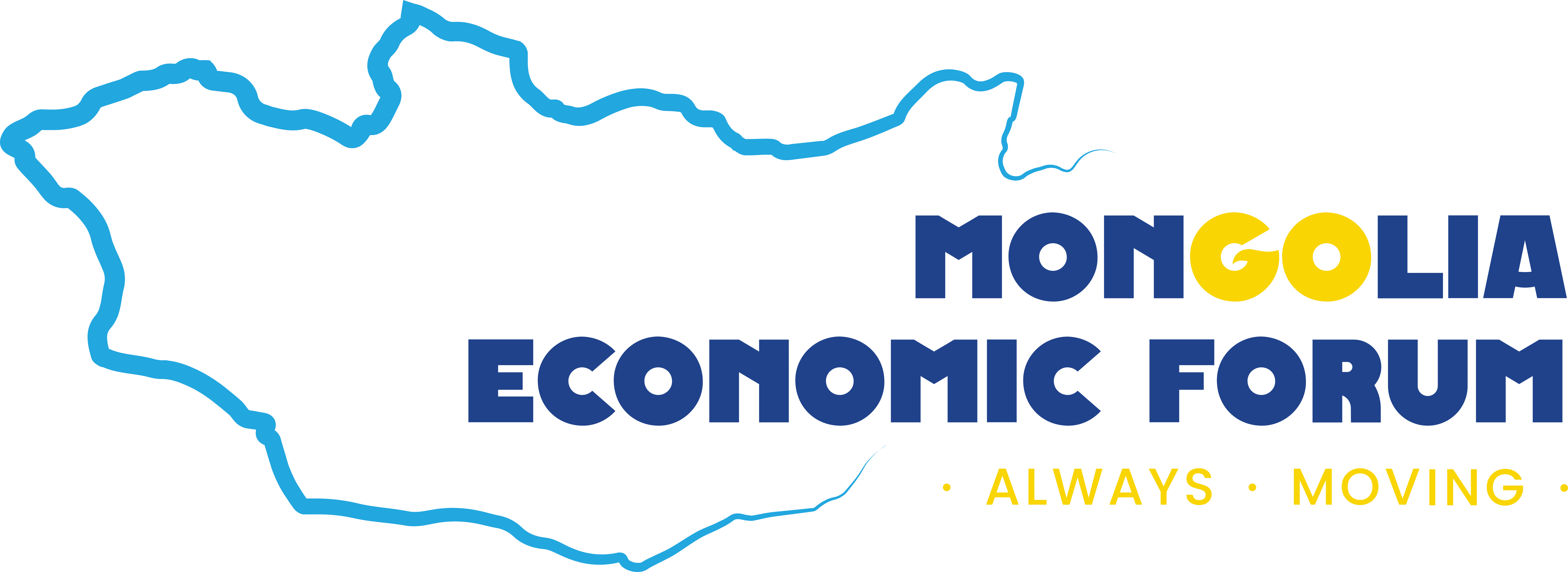

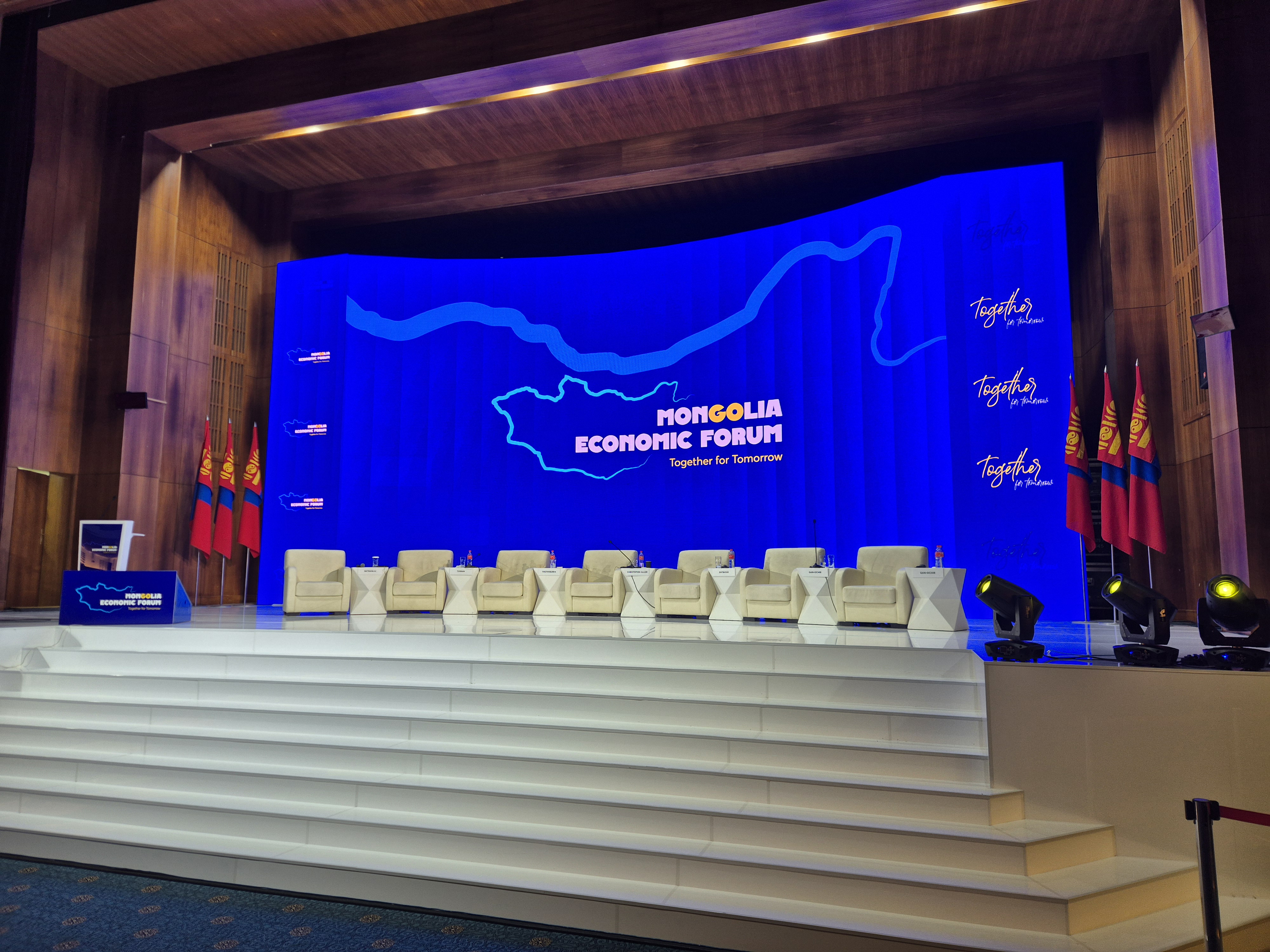
- Formation: • 2010, Mongolia Economic Forum
- Type: Non-profit organization
- Legal status: NGO
- Headquarters: Ulaanbaatar, Mongolia
- Region served: Mongolia
- Chairman: Ganhuyag Chuluun Hutagt
- Website: meforum.mn

The Mongolia Economic Forum (MEF; Mongolian: Монголын эдийн засгийн чуулган) is a non-profit, non-political and non-governmental organization in Mongolia that held its first annual conference in 2010. It provides a platform to explore collaborative opportunities across government and business, multilateral organizations, and the third sector, to implement development policies that help Mongolia achieve economic growth.

== History ==
=== Mongolia Economic Forum 2010 ===
The inaugural Mongolia Economic Forum was held on 8–9 February 2010 under the auspices of Prime Minister S. Batbold with the slogan “Together we can.” Discussions focused on budgetary reform, development of the mining sector, the environment and green economy, state registration reforms, capital market reforms, and competitiveness. During this first Forum, an independent, non-governmental organization was founded under the name Mongolia Economic Forum with the mandate to organize an annual national economic forum.

=== Mongolia Economic Forum 2011 ===
The 2011 Forum took place on 2–4 March 2011, again under the auspices of Prime Minister S. Batbold, with the slogan “Together in Development.” The program centered on four core themes: human development, development policy, governance, and infrastructure, across 15 sessions. A key highlight was a roundtable with delegates from the World Economic Forum in the Civil Chamber of the Presidential Office, focusing on responsible mining, transparency in extractive industries, and joint efforts against corruption. The Invest Mongolia forum was also held alongside MEF, broadening investor dialogue.

=== Mongolia Economic Forum 2012 ===
Held on 2–6 March 2012, the Forum focused on “Economic Development: Inclusive Growth,” “Social Policy: Equitable Growth,” and “Competitiveness: Innovation and Green Growth.” Eleven discussions explored how to ensure that economic growth translates into social progress and competitive advantage. In preparation, a series of pre-forum debates were conducted with scientists, business leaders, and the wider public, and their feedback was reflected in the year’s main themes.

=== Mongolia Economic Forum 2013 ===
The 2013 Forum convened on 4–5 March 2013 under the auspices of Prime Minister N. Altankhuyag, with the slogan “Mongolian Brand.” Discussions explored how Mongolia can diversify beyond mining, develop a national brand, and address the challenges of being landlocked. Plenary sessions covered national branding and development, development financing, the labor market and human resources, the legal environment, economic diversification, and the business environment, complemented by special sessions under the annual theme.

=== Mongolia Economic Forum 2014 ===
On 24–25 March 2014, the Forum was held under the auspices of Prime Minister N. Altankhuyag with the slogan “Made in Mongolia.” With 34 breakout sessions, the agenda focused on “Scenarios for Mongolia” and “Development Policy and Planning.” Delegates from the World Economic Forum introduced scenario materials and a dedicated video, highlighting possible development pathways for Mongolia and encouraging long-term strategic thinking.

=== Mongolia Economic Forum 2015 ===
The 2015 Forum took place on 2–3 April 2015 with the support of Prime Minister Ch. Saikhanbileg under the slogan “Trust.” Over two days, 18 subject discussions were held on Mongolia’s long-term vision and the macroeconomic situation. A central theme was how to improve Mongolia’s credit rating and credibility in international financial markets, emphasizing fiscal discipline, policy stability, and investor confidence.

=== Mongolia Economic Forum 2016 ===
Held on 30–31 March 2016 with the support of Prime Minister Ch. Saikhanbileg, the Forum adopted the slogan “Lessons, Challenges, and Solutions.” The first day focused on global and regional economic trends and Mongolia’s economic trajectory, while the second day centered on the business environment. An important segment addressed Mongolia’s long-term development policy, bringing together representatives of the five parliamentary parties. The event also marked the 25th anniversary of Mongolia’s membership in the Asian Development Bank, with participation from ADB’s Southeast Asia Director.

=== Mongolia Economic Forum 2018 ===
The “Mongolia Economic Forum 2018” was held on 21–22 May 2018 under the theme “Let’s Synergize.” The Forum opened with the plenary session “Integrated Investment Policy and Implementation Programs of Mongolia,” followed by discussions focused on attracting development financing and promoting investment into Mongolia. During the Forum, the Government introduced its “Three Pillared Development Strategy” to the public.

=== Mongolia Economic Forum 2022 ===
After a pause, the Forum returned on 7–8 April 2022 under the theme “New Recovery.” Supported by the Mongolia Economic Forum NGO, the event focused on Mongolia’s New Revival Policy and how to address post-crisis economic and social challenges. Twelve side sessions examined revival in key sectors, seeking a shared understanding and practical policy directions. Participants included representatives from government, business, universities, research institutions, and international organizations.

=== Mongolia Economic Forum 2023 ===
The 2023 Forum was held on 9–10 July 2023 with the theme “Welcome to Mongolia.” Around 1,500 participants gathered across five locations. Plenary sessions discussed the sustainable development policy of Mongolia, the economy and sustainability, “New Future – New Opportunities,” and infrastructure. Prime Minister Luvsannamsrain Oyun-Erdene inaugurated the Forum, while Chairman of the State Great Khural G. Zandanshatar delivered the main address. Senior executives from the Asian Development Bank and Rio Tinto Group joined as honored guests.

=== Mongolia Economic Forum 2024 ===
On 8–9 July 2024, the Forum convened under the theme “Go Mongolia.” The event brought together around 2,000 participants, featuring four plenary sessions and 12 side sessions over two days. Plenaries focused on “What’s next – Development policy,” “Green energy and energy transition,” “Smart city,” and “FDI in the banking sector.” Side sessions explored tourism, mining, intensive agriculture, the energy transition, and other priority sectors. Prime Minister Luvsannamsrain Oyun-Erdene inaugurated the Forum, and Chairman of the State Great Khural Amarbayasgalan Dashzeveg delivered the main speech.

=== Mongolia Economic Forum 2025 ===
The 2025 Mongolia Economic Forum took place on 8–9 July 2025 under the theme “Together for Tomorrow.” The Forum continued MEF’s mission of convening high-level dialogue on Mongolia’s future development path, focusing on collaboration across government, business, and civil society to address emerging challenges and opportunities. The event was inaugurated by Prime Minister Gombojavyn Zandanshatar.

== Organization ==
Headquartered in Ulaanbaatar, Mongolia, the Mongolia Economic Forum is a non-governmental organization and was established in 2010.

Chairman of the Mongolia Economic Forum NGO is Ganhuyag Chuluun Hutagt. The members of the Board of Directors include Battushig Batbold, Byambasaihan Bayanjargal, and Ganzorig Vanchig.
