= Ganhuyag Chuluun Hutagt =

Mongolian businessman

Ganhuyag Chuluun Hutagt Чулууны Ганхуяг
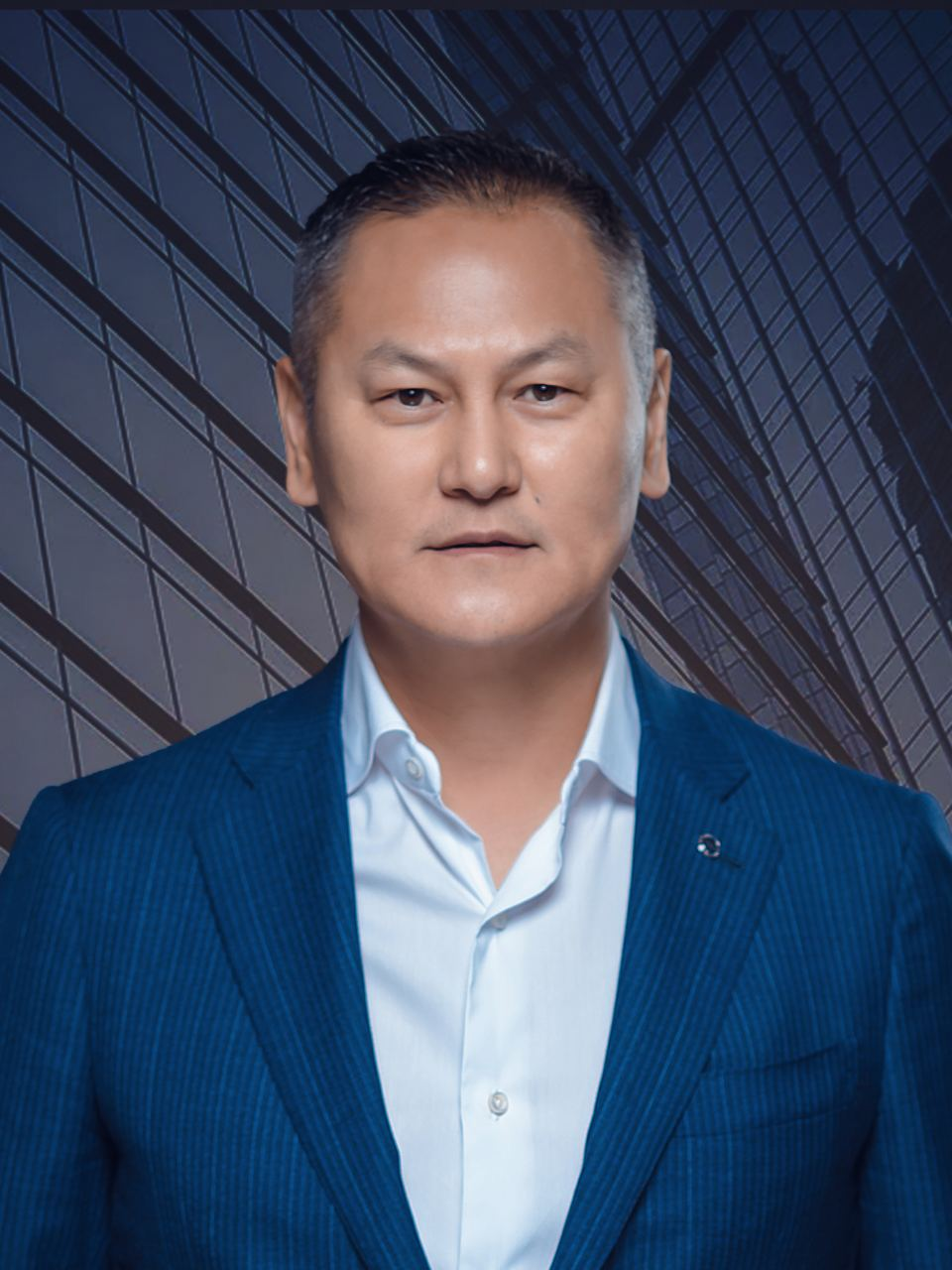
- Born: 1973 (age 52–53); Ulaanbaatar, Mongolia
- Education: Budapest University of Economic Sciences
- Office: Executive Chairman of Ard Financial Group, Mongolia
- Political party: Mongolian People's Party

Ganhuyag Chuluun Hutagt (Mongolian: Хутагт овогт Чулууны Ганхуяг) is a Mongolian businessman, public figure, and former Vice Minister of Finance of Mongolia.

== Career ==
Ganhuyag Chuluun Hutagt started his career in 1991 as a floor supervisor at the Mongolian Stock Exchange and moved on to engage in the family business a year later. He joined the Central Bank's Supervision Division after graduating from the Budapest University of Economic Sciences in 1997.

He then worked for UNDP’s MicroStart Project in 1998, initially as a Finance Manager and then as Operations Manager, before becoming founding Executive Director of Mongolia’s first non-bank microfinance company, XAC (Golden Fund for Development) in 1999.

At the initiative of Gan, as he is called internationally, XAC subsequently merged with another NBFI, USAID funded Goviin Ekhlel, to form XacBank, a commercial bank with a social and development mandate. Ganhuyag held the position of Chief Executive Officer of XacBank and its parent XAC-GE Group (currently known as TenGer Financial Group), from the founding in 2002 until 2009. He then led the international expansion effort of TenGer Financial Group, until he was appointed Vice-Minister of Finance of Mongolia in 2010. He resigned from office after his unsuccessful bid for a seat in Mongolia's Parliament in June 2012. He started in the position of the Executive Chairman of Ard Financial Group (former Equity Investment Trust LLC, or EIT) in August 2012 until August 2014 when he became the CEO of Ard Financial Group. He served as Chairman of Ard subsidiaries such as Ard Credit, Ard Insurance, Ard Securities, etc, leading the successful IPOs on the Mongolian Stock Exchange.

He became the CEO of Ard Financial Group, under the mission of the Investor Nation. Ard Financial Group took part in the privatization of Mongol Post in 2016 and became 31 percent shareholder of Mongolia's postal network. Ganhuyag serves as non-executive director on the Board of Mongol Post listed on the Mongolian Stock Exchange under ticker MNP.

Ard Insurance (AIC) was IPOd in October 2018 and Ard Credit (ADB) went public in March 2019. Ard Financial Group became a publicly listed company through RTO in August 2019. He founded idax, Mongolia’s largest cryptocurrency exchange platform, and launched ArdCoin (ARDX), the country’s first national cryptocurrency, in 2018. In addition to idax, Ganhuyag introduced ArdMoney (ARDM), a decentralized finance (DeFi) loyalty reward token designed to complement the ArdCoin ecosystem.

He initiated Investor Nation movement to promote wider public ownership of strategic assets in 2014 and came up with the term CryptoNation in 2017 leading a charge of Mongolia into blockchain and crypto space. He holds annual and biannual public forums under these names and has been promoting ArdCoin since 2018.

Ganhuyag coined the phrase 'Wolf Economy' to describe Mongolia's rapidly growing economy (similar to the 'tiger economies' in Southeast Asia) in 2009. The phrase got picked up and popularized in a Renaissance Capital report in the same year.

== Public office ==
Ganhuyag served as Mongolia’s Vice Minister of Finance from 2010 - 2012. He was a member of the Business Advisory Council to the President of Mongolia from 2005 to 2009 and has served as advisor to the Prime Minister of Mongolia on development and economic issues from 2009 to 2010.

Ganhuyag is member of the Mongolian People’s Party’s Governing Council, Baga Hural, since 2010. He served on several working groups of the Parliament to draft laws related to financial inclusion. He has served as the honorary consul of Hungary in Mongolia from 2006 to 2010 and has been a lecturer at the Frankfurt School of Finance & Management’s MFI Management Summer Academy since 2004. Ganhuyag is the Chairman of the Mongolia Economic Forum, where he previously served as General Secretary (2010–2023). He is a member of the Economic Development Board of Mongolia, President of the CEO Club of Mongolia, and Founding Chairman of the Ulaanbaatar Chamber of Commerce. He also chairs the Mongolian Young Global Leaders Council, and is a founder of Global Shapers Mongolia and a board member of Global Dignity.
