= Bank of Mongolia =

Monetary authority of Mongolia

Bank of Mongolia Mongolbank Монголбанк
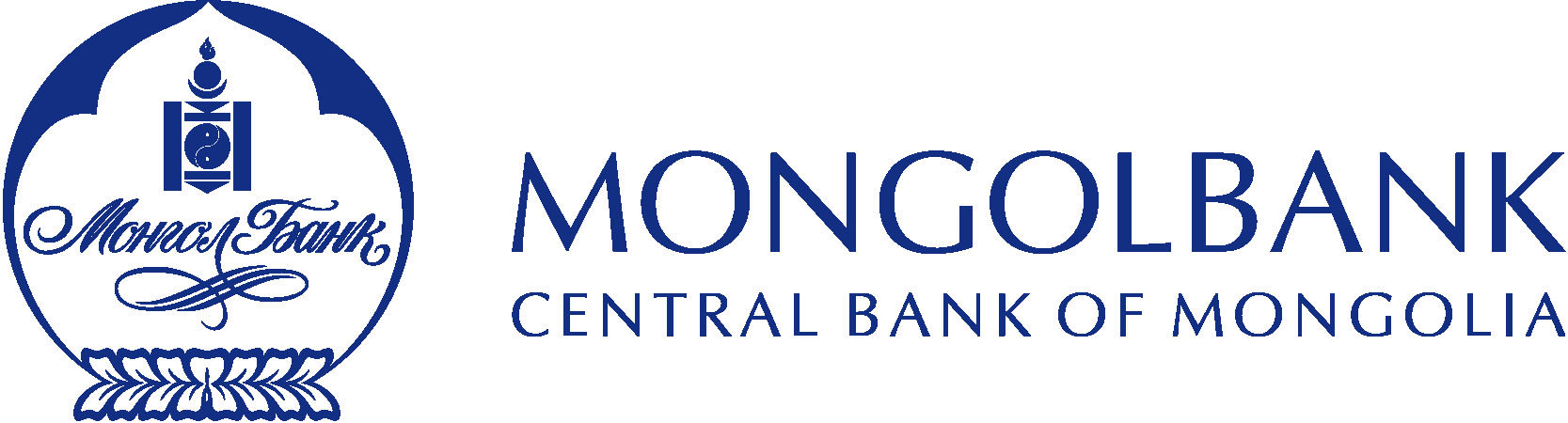

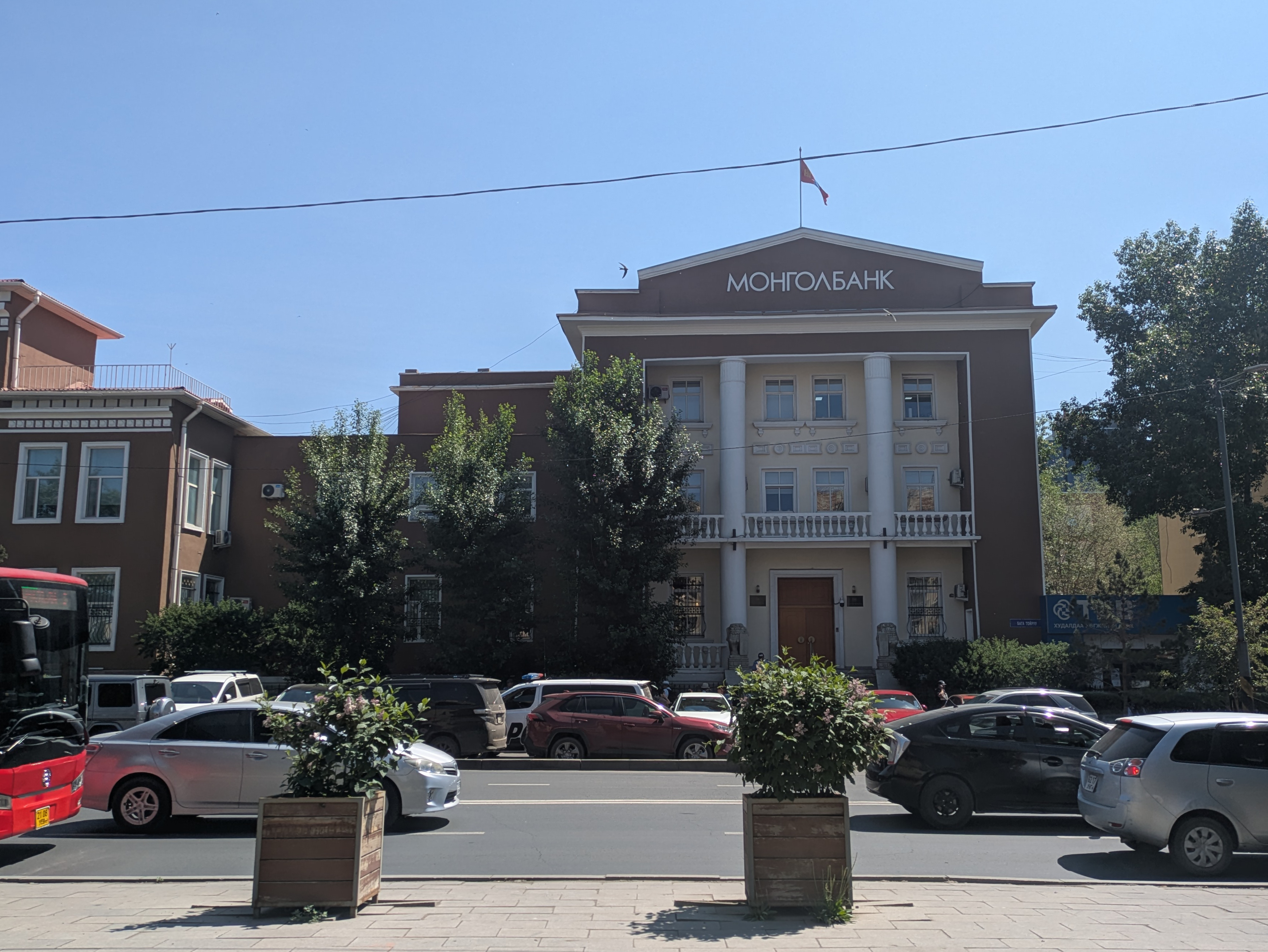
- Central bank of: Mongolia
- Headquarters: Ulaanbaatar, Mongolia
- Ownership: 100% State owned
- Governor: Byadran Lkhagvasuren
- Currency: Mongolian tögrög MNT (ISO 4217)
- Reserves: US$8.9 billion (September 2026)
- Website: Official website

The Bank of Mongolia, referred to as Mongolbank (Mongolian: Монголбанк [mɔ́ɴɢɞɬpəŋkʰ]), is the central bank of Mongolia. The main objective of the Bank of Mongolia is to ensure stability of the Mongolian tögrög. Within its main objective the Bank of Mongolia promotes balanced and sustained development of the national economy, through maintaining the stability of money, financial markets and the banking system.

== History ==
=== Mongolian People's Republic ===
A joint Mongolian-Soviet bank, called the "Trade and Industry Bank of Mongolia" (Bank of Mongolia) was opened on June 2, 1924 with head office in Urga and a single branch in Altanbulag, Selenge Province.

At that time, the bank's capital was 260000 yanchaan (the currency of the period). It operated with 22 employees, 18 of which were Russian specialists and 4 of them were Mongolian. At the start, the joint bank was called by two names, "Trade and Industry Bank of Mongolia", and the "Bank of Mongolia", but it was named the Bank of Mongolia in official papers and documents.

Due to the absence of a national currency, the bank faced difficulties in fulfilling financial and monetary-credit policy in the first 18 months, and foreign currencies were used in circulation.

Consequently, according to the decision of Ikh Khural, the Government of Mongolia issued a resolution to conduct monetary reform on February 22, 1925. In accordance with this resolution, the Bank of Mongolia issued a new national currency, the tögrög, consisting of 25% for precious metal and foreign stable currency, and 75% for marketable goods.

In 1954, the makeup of the Bank staff had increased to 98% (compare to 18% in 1924). On the basis of this extension, the former Soviet Union transferred its own share of capital and stocks in the Bank of Mongolia to the state of Mongolia. Following this, the Bank of Mongolia was renamed as the State Bank of Mongolia.

In 1991, a completely new two-tier banking system was established in Mongolia. Since its establishment, the Bank of Mongolia has been influencing and contributing efforts on the economy of the country, in maintaining the monetary policy aimed at the stabilisation of the value of the currency, and reduction of the inflation rate in the unstable transitional period.

=== Mongolia ===
In May 2010, the Bank of Mongolia tightened its monetary policy stance by raising its policy rate by 1.0 percentage points to 11.00 percent to bring CPI inflation down, to reduce the growth of credit and monetary aggregates.

As of April 2012, the Bank of Mongolia had US$2.9 billion in foreign reserves. The foreign reserves on June 30, 2011 contained US$79 million of U.S governmental securities. Gross international reserves stood at US$7.0 billion at the end of 2025 and US$8.9 billion at the end of September 2026.

== Governors ==
- V. I. Komar, jointly, 1924–1931
- D. I. Mikilman, jointly, 1924–1931
- N. I. Doichman, jointly, 1924–1931
- S. Dovchin 1931–1939
- Yumjaagiin Tsedenbal, 1939–1940
- T. Baldan, 1940–1955
- G. Baljid, 1955–1960
- Luyugiin Lkhamsuren, 1960–1965
- P. Tumur, 1965–1975
- D. Danzan, 1975–1981
- Gochoogiyin Khuderchuluun, 1981–1991
- Naidansürengiin Jargalsaikhan, 1991–1992
- Demchigjabyn Molomjamts, 1992–1996
- Jigjid Unenbat, 1996–2000
- Ochirbat Chuluunbat, 2000–2006
- Alag Batsukh, 2006–2009
- Lkhanaasuren Purevdorj, 2009–2012
- Naidansuren Zoljargal, 2012–2016
- Nadmidyn Bayartsaikhan, 2016–2019
- Byadrangiin Lkhagvasüren, 2019-2025
- S. Narantsogt, 2025-Present

== Ongoing activities ==
Bank of Mongolia increased minimum capital requirement for banks periodically, and capital adequacy ratio of the banking sector was as high as 14-24 percent since 2000, which is 1.8-3 times higher than international minimum standards. With strong economic growth, private sector credit has increased significantly. Banks’ total outstanding loans were MNT 60 billion which were issued to 1700 borrowers in 2000, compared to total outstanding loans of MNT 2,000 billion issued to 483 thousand borrowers in September, 2007. Ratio of non-performing loans fell to 3.5 per cent in September 2007, down from 24 per cent in 2000 and 50% in 1999 following repeated banking crises in the 1990s. Following the 2008 financial crisis, this rose again to 20% in 2009 but by June 2010 had fallen to 7.7%.

Financial sector is fully privatized, and now 16 banks, 141 non-bank financial institutions and 131 savings and credit cooperatives are operating in Mongolia. Profitability of banks was high compared to most advanced countries, which have return on assets ratio of 2.7 per cent in 2007. And three commercial banks such as Khan Bank, XacBank and Trade and Development Bank of Mongolia are also rated by the agencies on its products, assets and activities. They are on its way to issue securities to foreign market.

The bank is active in developing financial inclusion policy and is a member of the Alliance for Financial Inclusion. In 2009, the Bank of Mongolia rescued Zoos Bank at a cost of MNT 100 billion, combining it with Anod Bank to form the government-owned State Bank. Later in 2013, the Mongol Bank was forced to take over the 5th largest lender, Savings Bank, and merge with State Bank, due to a bad loan made to a gold mine owned by its parent company, Just Group, at a cost of $120 million. State Bank is a state-owned company separate from the Bank of Mongolia.

== See also ==
- List of central banks
- List of financial supervisory authorities by country
