= State Bank (Mongolia) =

Bank of Mongolia

State Bank of Mongolia Төрийн банк
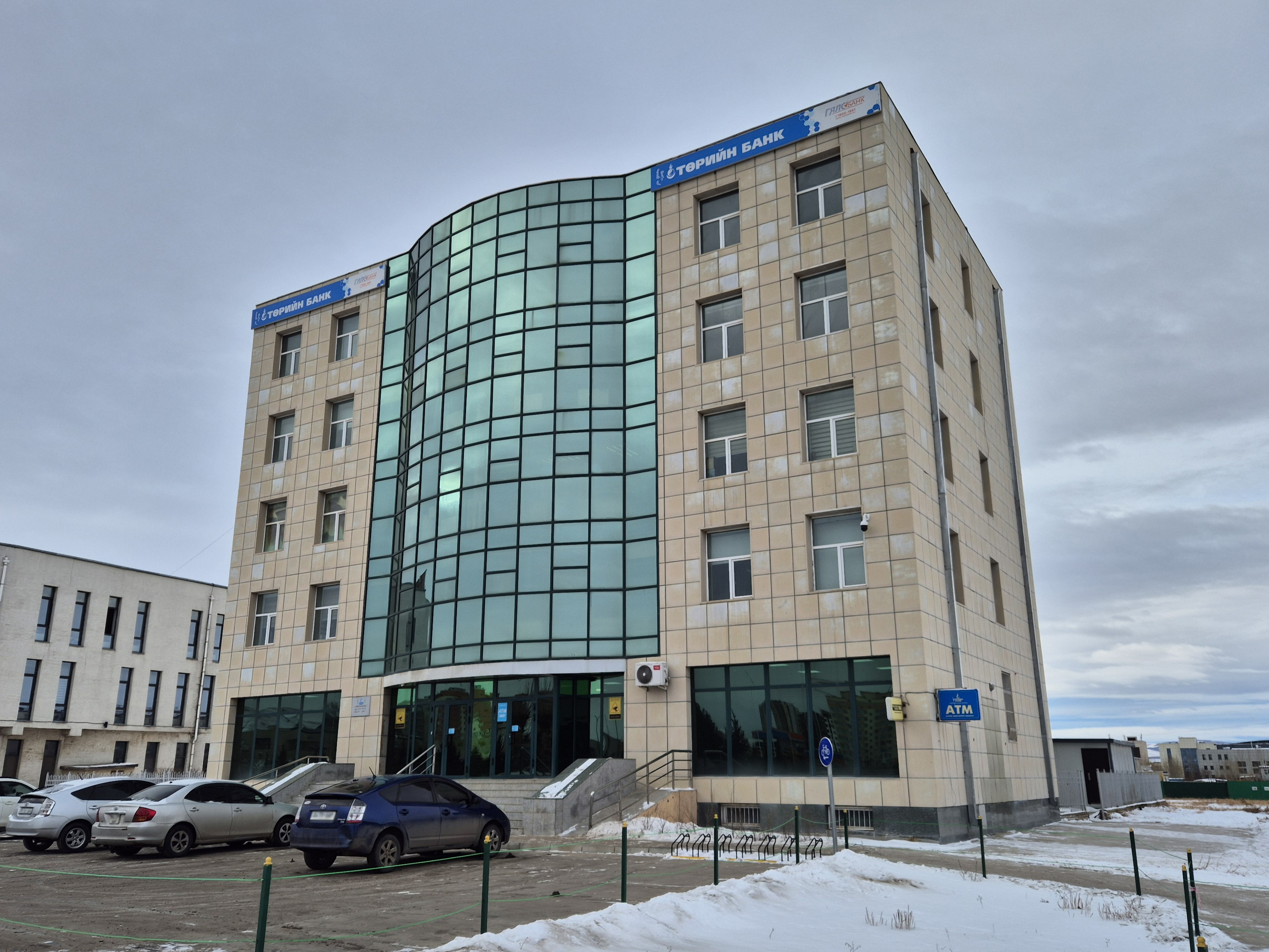
- Formation: November 23, 2009
- Type: Commercial bank
- Location: Ulaanbaatar city
- Region served: Nationwide
- Members: Bank of Mongolia
- CEO: Gantur Ulzii (since 2020)
- Website: https://www.statebank.mn/

The State bank (Mongolian: Төрийн Банк, romanized: Töriin Bank) was established by the government of Mongolia from the assets of two failed banks, Anod Bank and Zoos Bank, of Mongolia on November 24, 2009. It has about 201 to 500 employees. In July 2013, the government of Mongolia combined the 5th-largest bank, Savings Bank, with the State Bank after Savings Bank failed due to a large bad loan to its parent company, Just Group, and previous losses from acquiring Mongol Post Bank, at a cost to the state of $122 million. All 503 branches and 1.7 million customers of Savings Bank were transferred to the State Bank. Its headquarters is at Baga toiruu 7/1, 1st khoroo, Chingeltei District, Ulaanbaatar.

== See also ==
- Bank of Mongolia
- Zoos Bank
