= Development Bank of Mongolia =

State-owned bank of Mongolia

- Native name: Монгол улсын хөгжлийн банк
- Company type: state-owned
- Industry: banking
- Founded: 2011
- Founder: government of Mongolia
- Headquarters: Sükhbaatar, Ulaanbaatar, Mongolia
- Products: financial services
- Website: Official website

The Development Bank of Mongolia (DBM; Mongolian: Монгол улсын хөгжлийн банк) is a state-owned bank headquartered in Sükhbaatar, Ulaanbaatar, Mongolia.

== History ==
The government of Mongolia initiated the establishment of the bank on 20 July 2010 and it was approved by the parliament on 10 February 2011.

== See also ==
- List of banks in Mongolia
