= Eznis Airways =

Mongolian airline

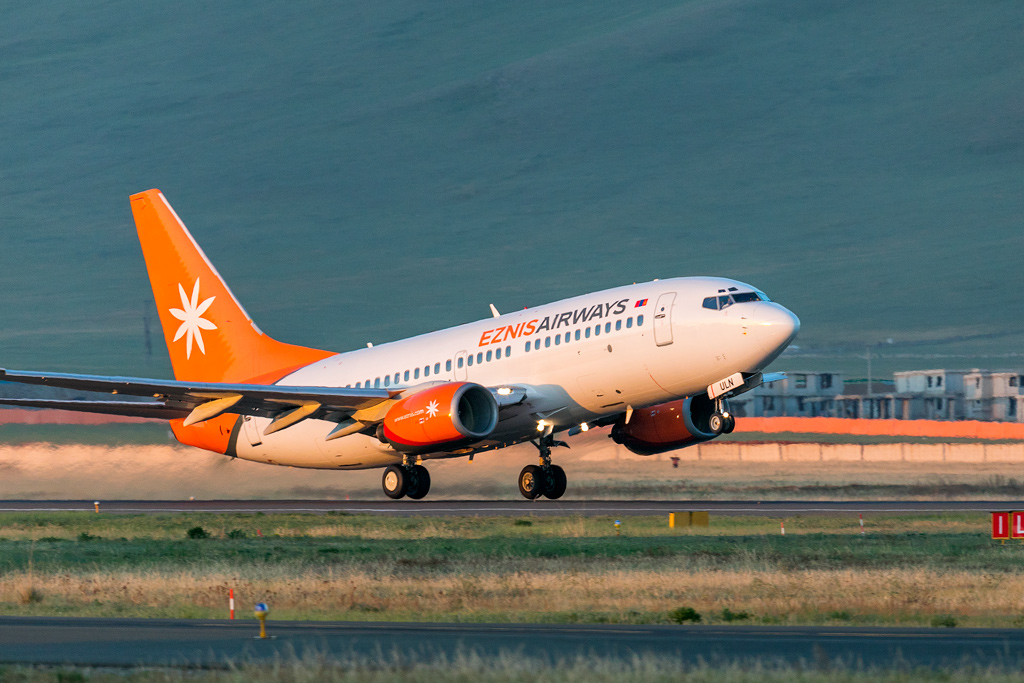
- Eznis Airways Boeing 737-700
IATA	ICAO	Call sign
MG	EZA	EZNIS
- Founded: 2006; 20 years ago
- Commenced operations: initially 2006; 20 years ago restarted 2019; 7 years ago (relaunch)
- Ceased operations: initially: 2014; 12 years ago and again on 28 May 2025; 16 months ago (temporarily)
- Hubs: Chinggis Khaan International Airport
- Fleet size: 0
- Destinations: 1
- Headquarters: Ulaanbaatar, Mongolia
- Key people: D. Oyundelger (CEO)
- Website: eznis.com

Eznis Airways LLC (Mongolian: Изинис Эйрвэйз ХХК, romanized: Izinis Eirweiz HHK, [ˈit͡sinis ˈɛːrwɛj(t)s xɑxɑˈkɑ]) is a charter airline and former scheduled carrier headquartered in Ulaanbaatar, Mongolia and based at Chinggis Khaan International Airport.

Once, it was the largest domestic airline with services to a number of Mongolian domestic points and an international route to Hong Kong and Russia. It also had authorization for, but did not operate, international services to Kazakhstan. The airline ceased operations in 2014, but in 2019 resumed operations.

== History ==
=== Foundation and early years ===
In 2004, the Newcom Group, researched the feasibility of initiating new domestic air transport services in Mongolia: In January 2006 they founded Eznis Airways, a wholly owned subsidiary. Eznis was granted Air Operator Certificate (AOC) No. 11 by the Mongolian Civil Aviation Authority (MCAA), and Eznis launched its inaugural service on December 6, 2006.

In July 2008 Eznis Airways launched the Radixx computer reservation system: the airline intends to introduce Internet booking for tour operators, travel agencies and the public. Eznis Airways gained a dominant position in Mongolia's domestic air travel market and by 2008 had carried its 100,000th passenger. The airline's first international regular services began in August 2009 to Hailar, China. In March 2010 Eznis Airways initiated flights to Hailar via Choibalsan in Mongolia. Launched in June 2010, Ulan-Ude, Russia was Eznis' second scheduled international destination.

=== Demise and restart ===
Eznis Airways LLC ceased operations on 22 May 2014 due to the financial difficulties, after restructuring measures failed during the previous two years. Eznis Airways, under a new ownership group, relaunched services in the second quarter of 2019, operating Boeing 737s on international routes. A Boeing 737-700 had already been acquired pending the airline's launch.

== Corporate affairs ==
=== Offices ===
The head office was formerly in the Shine Dul Building (Шинэ Дөл Билдинг) in Bayanzürkh, Ulaanbaatar, having moved there on 27 August 2011.

=== Branding ===
The airline's name "eznis" means "easiness in flight". "Ez" means "easy" and "nis" means "fly". The Eznis logo represents a compass with eight destinations. A soft, flower-type image was chosen to convey a relaxing and stress-free feeling.

=== Products ===
Products and services	Description
Scheduled services	
Charter services	Charter services to Vietnam and South Korea
Cargo and mail	Cargo and mail transportation service to the airline's destinations
EZ TOUR and EZ BIZ	Special offers for organizational clients, tour operators and travel agents

=== Onboard services ===
The airline publishes a quarterly in-flight magazine "Smartway" in Mongolian and English, featuring articles about Mongolian nature, history, culture and tradition. The airline also offers Mongolian daily newspapers on its flights, and sells items with the company name and logo.

=== Frequent flyer program ===
Eznis Airways launched EZ FLYER, its frequent flyer program, on January 15, 2009. The programs provides passengers with an opportunity to earn free or discounted flights by collecting corresponding points from each flight taken: the customer is required to collect boarding passes and tickets from scheduled flights and turn them in for reward redemption.

== Fleet ==
=== Current fleet ===
As of August 2025, Eznis Airways operates the following aircraft:

Eznis Airways Fleet
Aircraft	In service	Orders	Passengers	Notes
Total	0	—		

The airline's sole Boeing 737-700 has been stored since 9 March 2025.

=== Fleet development ===
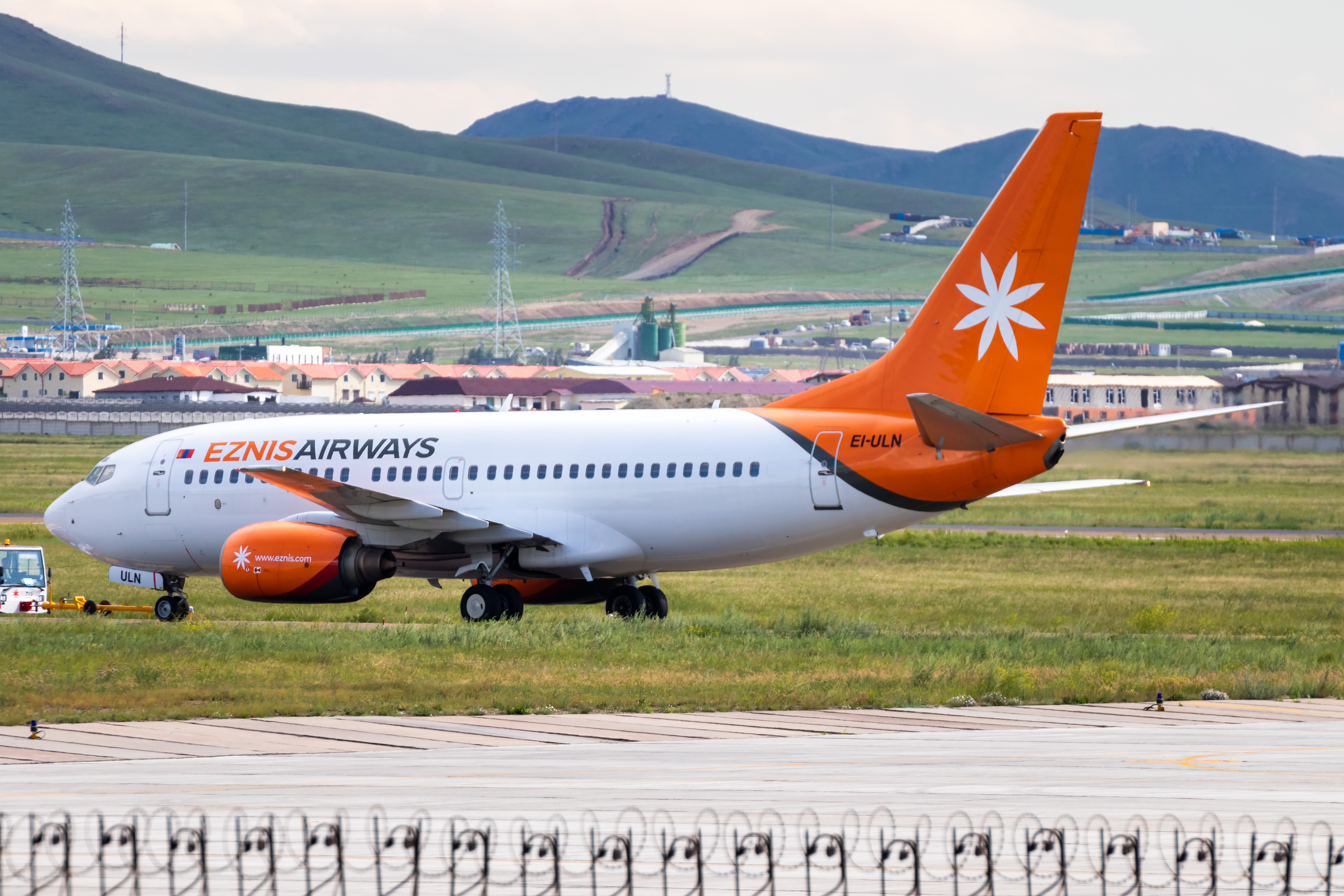
Eznis Airways Boeing 737-700 (2019).

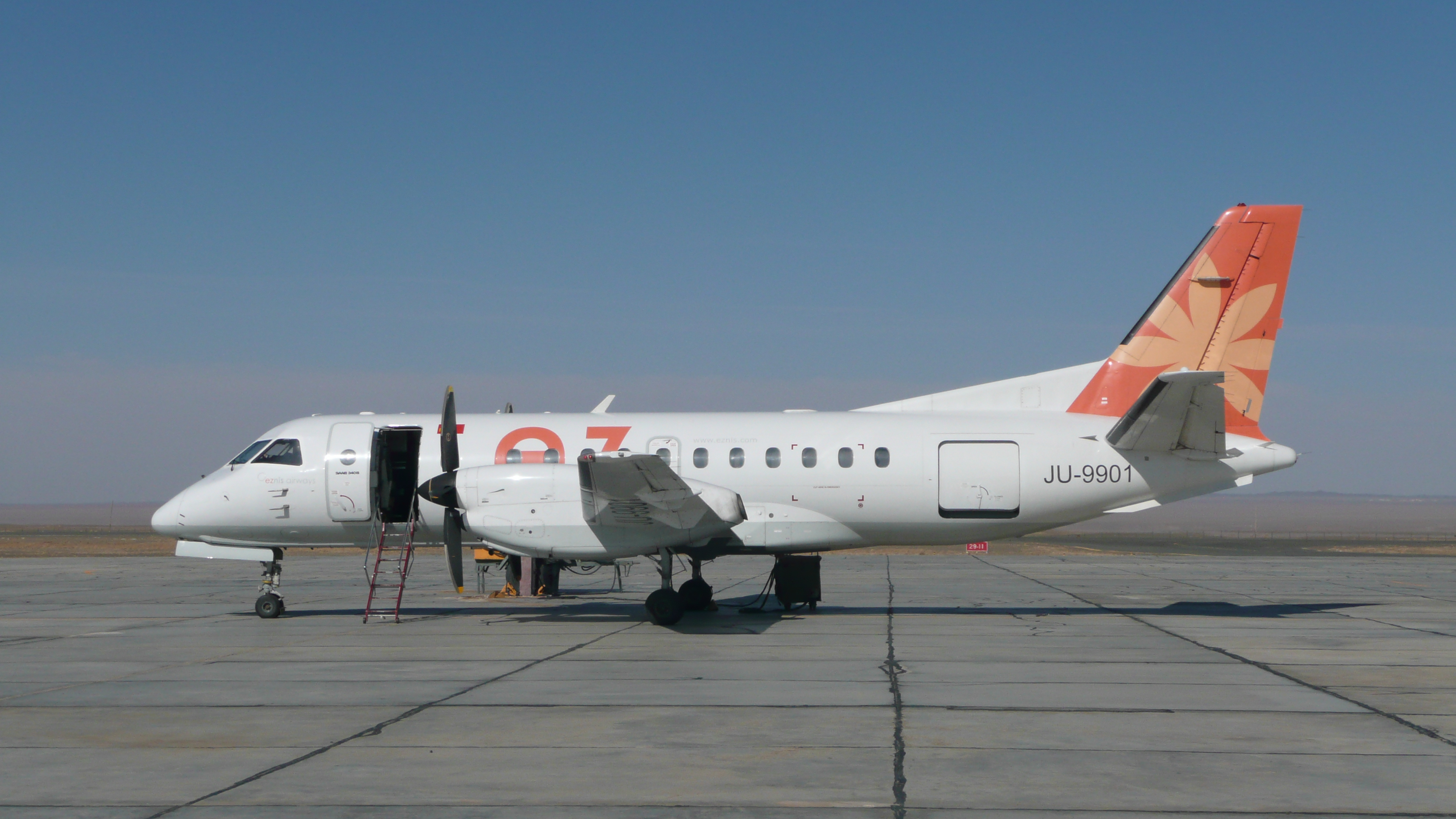
A former Eznis Airways Saab 340 (2010).

The airline decided to introduce jet aircraft in early 2011 and two Avro RJ85 aircraft (both ex-Lufthansa Cityline airframes) joined the fleet. The first was delivered from the UK in June 2011 (registered as JU-9909) with the second arriving in September 2011 (JU-9915). The aircraft were primarily destined to be used for charter flying to mining sites in the Gobi desert and were modified for operations on gravel runways. Both Avros were retired on 24 May, 2013. With both of them initially going to Ukraine Mediterranean Airlines, then being sold to Mahan Air five days later. The aircraft were also used on services to Khovd, Ulaangom and Ulgii, but declining load factors and unrealistic fare structures made the routes uneconomic for the RJs to operate. Consequently, the airline looked to the Bombardier Dash8-Q400 to ply longer domestic routes while the Avros continued to provide the lift capacity required by the mining companies. The Q400s had their Danish registration cancelled by 2015 (OY-YAG repainted and now operates as S2-AGW for US-Bangla Airlines).

The Boeing 737 venture was a four-month exercise for the company. It was leased with a view to Eznis opening routes to Seoul, Beijing and Hong Kong. However, Eznis' access to international routes was denied, thus making the Boeing 737 project nonviable. Apart from operating a few charter flights, the aircraft never entered scheduled service.
