= Mobicom Corporation =

Mongolian telecommunications company

MobiCom Corporation
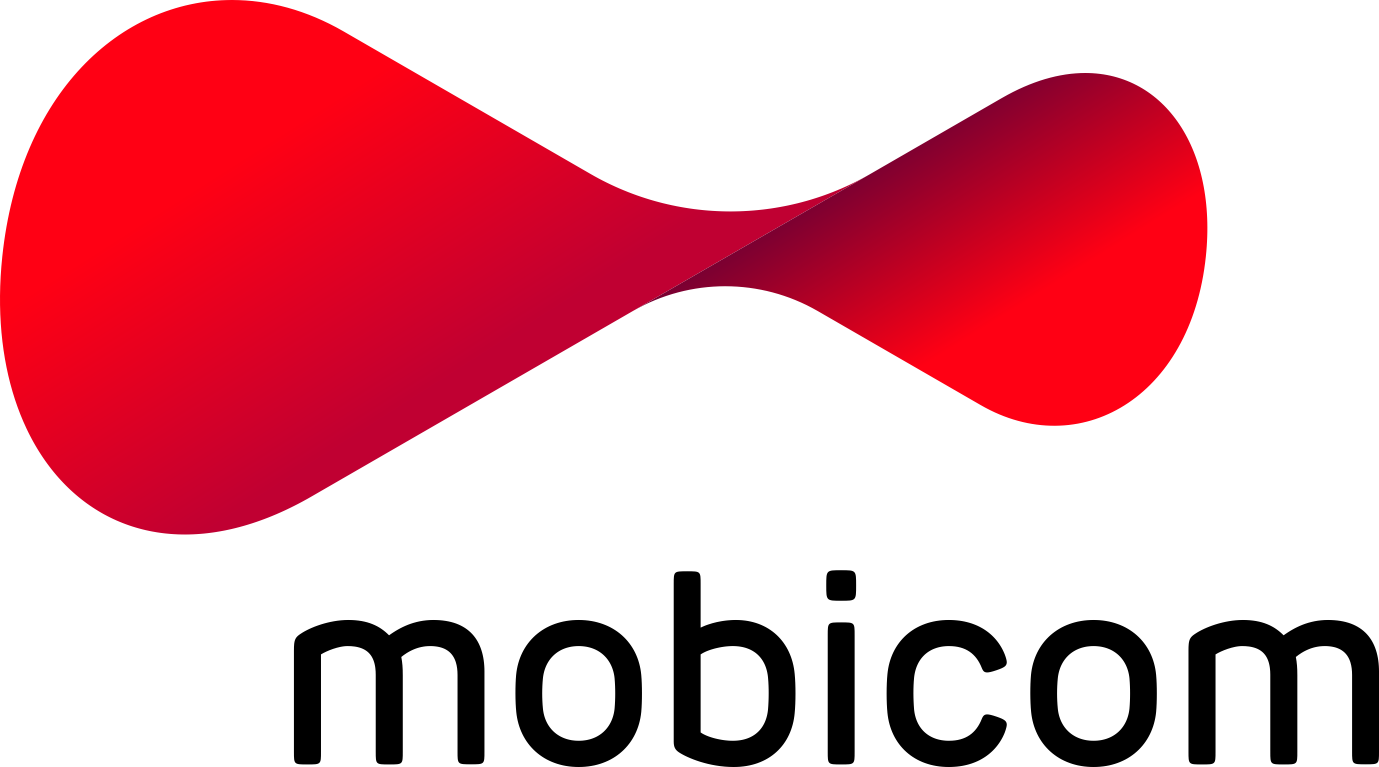
- Founded: 18 March 1996
- Headquarters: Ulaanbaatar, Mongolia
- Key people: Tatsuya Hamada (CEO)
- Website: www.mobicom.mn

Mobicom Corporation (Mongolian: Мобиком Корпораци) is the largest mobile phone operator in Mongolia.

It was established as a joint Mongolian-Japanese venture on 18 March 1996, to be the first Mongolian cell phone service. It was founded by Newcom Group, Sumitomo Corporation, and KDDI. Mongolia's Newcom. In 2016 March, Mobicom was consolidated in KDDI Corporation Group and KDDI took majority share.

As of June, 2015, Mobicom holds over 33 percent of the mobile service market,. It delivers its services through 64 branch units, 2,200 dealers and over 10,000 mobile sales points.

Aside from cellular communications, Mobicom also has services including international communications, Internet and satellite communications and wireless local loop or WLL. Its prepaid services are exclusively sold through Newtel LLC.

Mobicom introduced 3.5G networking in 2009, and provides HSPA. However it was initially late to 3G, 4G and 5G compared to other telecom companies such as Unitel.

Mobicom network supports phones with UMTS 2100, HSDPA 2100, HSUPA 2100, HSPA 2100, 3G, 3.5G, LTE, VoLTE, 4G+, and 5G.
