= Newcom Group =

Mongolian investment company

Newcom LLC (Newcom Group)

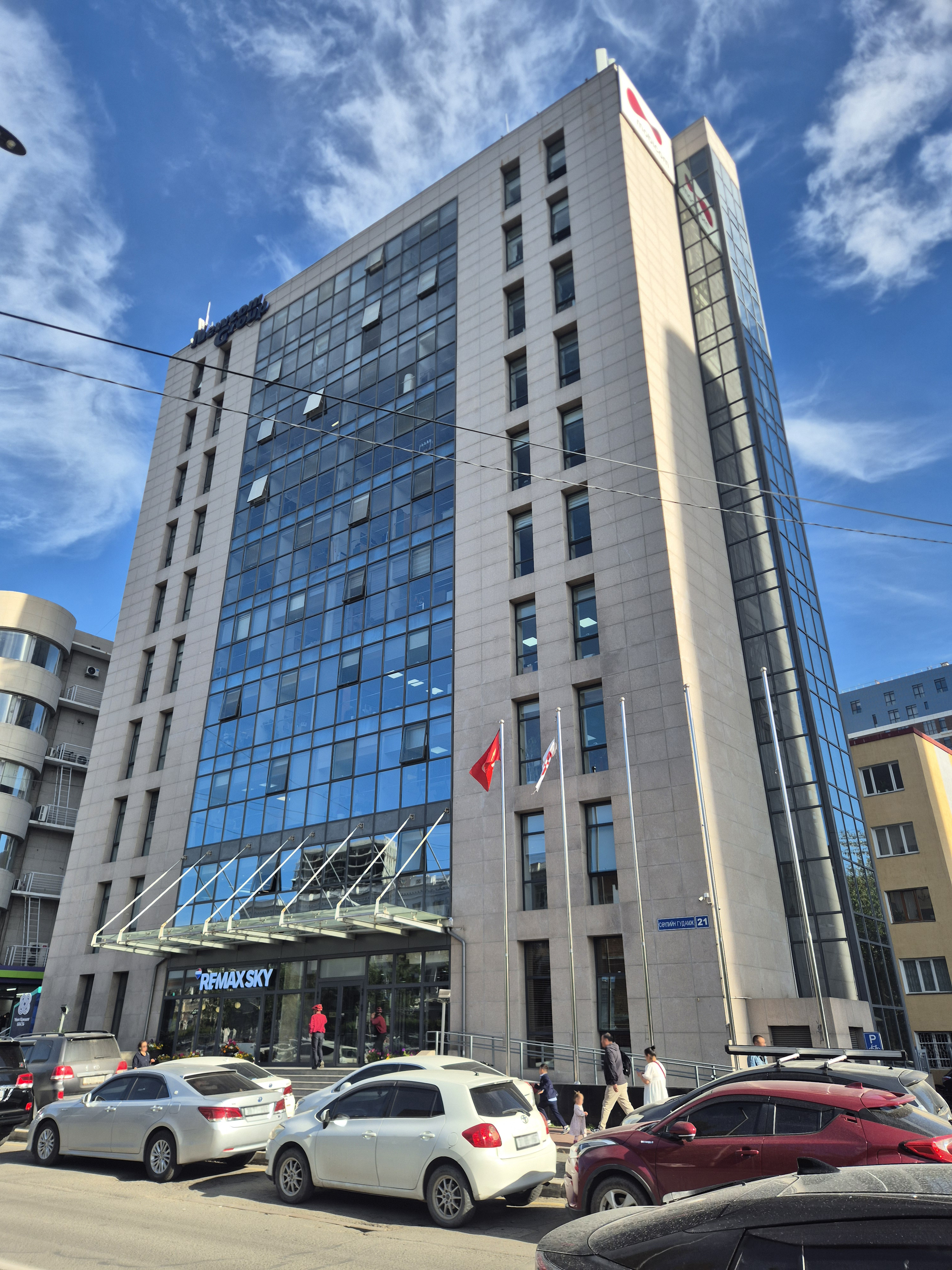
- Naiman Zovkhis Building which houses the headquarters of Newcom Group
- Company type: Limited liability company
- Founded: 1993
- Headquarters: Naiman Zovkhis Building, 21 Seoul Street, Ulaanbaatar, Mongolia
- Key people: Ts. Boldbaatar (Chairman); R. Arvintsogt (Board Member); Bolor Jargalsaikhan (Chief Executive Officer)
- Subsidiaries: MobiCom Corporation; Eznis Airways; Tsegts Security; Clean Energy; Newcom Property; Newcom Mining Services; Clean Energy Asia
- Website: www.newcom.mn

Newcom Group (Mongolian: Ньюком Групп) (the official name: Newcom LLC) is a Mongolian investment company. Its portfolio includes MobiCom Corporation, the first and the largest mobile telecommunications company in Mongolia, and Eznis Airways, the largest domestic airline in Mongolia. Newcom built the first wind farm in Mongolia, with a capacity of 50 MW.

== History ==
The company was founded in April 1993 by N. Tuya to provide professional consulting services. In September 1995, the firm became the authorized distributor of Motorola to sell short and ultra short waveradio stations. At the same time, it formed its first subsidiary, MobiCom, as a joint venture with its Japanese partners, Sumitomo Corporation and KDDI Corporation.

== Subsidiaries ==
=== MobiCom Corporation ===
MobiCom started its operations, serving its first customers, on March 18, 1996 after 6 months of its establishment. Meeting the requirements of the tender announced by the Government of Mongolia, MobiCom launched its network with GSM technology, which is the most advanced digital system of mobile communication. Today, MobiCom has become the largest Mobile Telephone Service provider, with over 1,200,000 subscribers, and the biggest corporation in the information technology sector of Mongolia.

The following companies are subsidiaries of MobiCom:

- Newtel LLC
- MobiNet LLC
- Ulusnet LLC
- Newfund LLC
- Mongol Content LLC
- Most PSP LLC
- Mobifinance LLC
- GrapeCity LLC

=== Eznis Airways ===
Eznis Airways is the leading Mongolian domestic airline with the largest network of domestic destinations within Mongolia and highest flight frequency on these routes. The airline was established on December 6, 2006 by Newcom LLC, one of the largest holding companies of Mongolia.

The first scheduled service flight of Eznis Airways was from Ulaanbaatar to Choibalsan in December 2006. Now the airline operates domestic scheduled and charter flights to 5 destinations of Mongolia including Dornod, Khuvsgul, Umnugobi, Uvs and Bayan-Ulgii, and operates international scheduled service to Hailar in China's Inner Mongolia region, and charter services to points in China, Russia and Kazakhstan.

The airline’s name “Eznis” means ‘easiness in flight’. The name consists of two parts which when put together say 'easy flight': the first two letters “Ez” stand for “easy” in English and “nis” is a Mongolian word meaning “fly”.

Eznis Airways ceased all operations from 22 May 2014 due to the financial difficulties and the current situation at the airline industry.

=== Clean Energy ===
Clean Energy Company (75% owned by Newcom and 25% owned by the EBRD) was established in 2004, initially to collect data from wind measurement stations established on Salkhit Mountain some 70 kilometers southeast of Ulaanbaatar to assess the site's suitability for the construction of a wind farm. Wind data has been collected from the site for over two years and the raw data has been compiled and assessed by Global Energy Concepts of the United States with the result that the selected site shows excellent potential for wind generation. The wind farm - the first in Mongolia - has been completed with financing from the EBRD and is being commissioned on June 20, 2013.

=== Newcom Property ===
Newcom Property LLC, after being set up in 1997 as Newcom Group’s real estate management and service division, became an independent company in 2005 specializing in property management services for real estate owners, investors, private individuals, businesses and organizations. The company now has over 230 employees.

=== Newcom Mining Services ===
Newcom Mining Services LLC is a construction and mining equipment rentals and sales company, established in 2011. It is the authorized distributor for Terex and Genie brands in Mongolia.

=== Tsegts ===
Tsegts LLC was established in 2004 as Newsec LLC to provide security services for all types of property.

=== American University of Mongolia ===
Newcom Group signed a strategic partnership with UC Berkeley’s Center for Executive Education in July 2011 and launched the American University of Mongolia’s Center for Executive Education in August, 2011 in Ulaanbaatar. The Center for Executive Education offers executive programs showcasing leadership, business management, strategy, project management, corporate finance, business contracts and negotiation, public policy, business communication, corporate social responsibility, marketing.

=== Clean Energy Asia ===
Clean Energy Asia LLC (CEA) was established in 2012 as a joint venture between Newcom LLC Newcom LLC and SB Energy Corp., renewable energy arm of Japan’s Softbank Corporation.
