= Zoos Bank =

Mongolian commercial bank

Zoos Bank was Mongolia's sixth largest privately owned commercial bank. It was delisted on the 6th of April 2021 after its bankruptcy.

== Company Profile ==
Since it was founded in May 1999, Zoos Bank provided commercial banking services and appointed an American national as its CEO in July, 2009. Benjamin Turnbull, well experienced in Mongolian banking, was appointed by the Governing Board of the bank and European Bank for Reconstruction and Development (EBRD) which was the major stakeholder of the bank, owning 25 percent plus one share. Zoos Bank had loaned MNT 60 billion to Mongol Gazar Holdings which later caused financial difficulties.

The Governor of the Bank of Mongolia, L. Purevdorj announced the Government's decision to take over Zoos Bank after receiving its request to merge with the Savings Bank of Mongolia. The bank’s stock price continued to rise for a short period after it was placed into receivership by the Bank of Mongolia, largely because the government announced a blanket guarantee on deposits to prevent a bank run. Following a deterioration in its financial condition, Zoos Bank JSC became insolvent and was unable to meet depositors’ withdrawal requests. As of November 2009, its liabilities exceeded its assets, prompting the Bank of Mongolia to place the bank into receivership. The receiver’s assessment found that 63% of the loan portfolio was non-performing, the bank had incurred losses of MNT 87.9 billion, and its liabilities exceeded its assets by MNT 54.9 billion (28%). The insolvency was attributed to serious regulatory violations, including breaches of single-borrower exposure limits, failure to record letters of credit off-balance sheet, falsified transactions to conceal foreign exchange position deficiencies, and inaccurate financial reporting.

Based on these findings and the applicable banking and deposit guarantee laws, the Bank of Mongolia ordered the compulsory liquidation of Zoos Bank on 24 November 2009.

To preserve financial stability and protect depositors, the Government of Mongolia implemented emergency measures under the Deposit Guarantee Law. It established a state-owned bridge bank and issued government bonds of up to MNT 100 billion to support the banking sector restructuring.

Under a purchase-and-assumption transaction, MNT 86.6 billion of performing assets and MNT 148.6 billion of liabilities were transferred to the newly established State Bank. As a result, approximately 80,685 transaction accounts holding MNT 30.6 billion and 25,735 deposit accounts totaling MNT 54.3 billion were fully protected from losses. The intervention reflected internationally recognized bank resolution practices and successfully contained systemic risks while safeguarding public confidence in the banking system.
