= Golomt Bank =

Bank of Mongolia

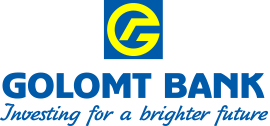

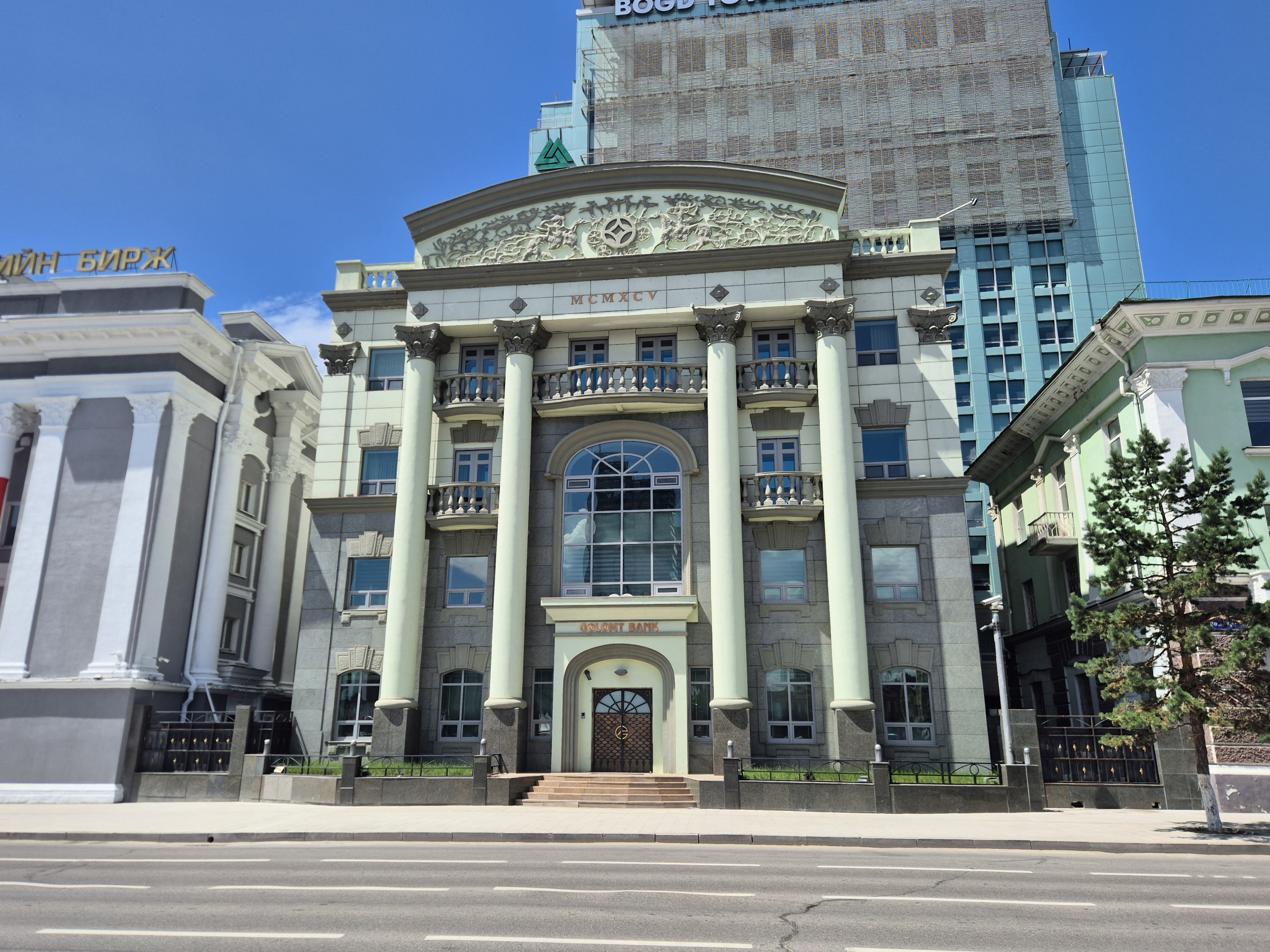
- Head Office of Golomt Bank in Ulaanbaatar
- Type: Public Company
- Traded as: MSE - GLMT
- Industry: Commercial Banking
- Founded: March 6, 1995
- Headquarters: Ulaanbaatar, Mongolia
- Number of locations: Over 100 branches
- Key people: Odonbaatar Amarzaya (CEO)
- Total assets: 19.2 trillion MNT (2025)
- Owner: Golomt Financial Group LLC (79.77%) Public (11.6%)
- Website: Official website

Golomt Bank (Mongolian: Голомт Банк) is a publicly traded financial services company based in Mongolia. As of 2025, the company employs 2800 workers, serving 1 million customers primarily in Mongolia. Golomt Bank is second largest commercial bank in Mongolia.

== History ==
Golomt Bank was founded in 1995 on March 6 with four employees and 400 million togrog as the country was transitioning from planned economy to market economy.

As of 31 December 2025, the Bank had over 100 branches within Mongolia. Also, digital channels include ATMs, Internet, and Mobile banking. On 29 June 2021, the bank submitted their plan to be public company for review to the Bank of Mongolia and Financial Regulatory Commission (Mongolian: Санхүүгийн Зохицуулах Хороо).

== Employees ==
As of 2025, Golomt has over 2,800 employees, with 30% male and 70% female.

== Awards ==
- "Best bank in Mongolia" 2024, 2022, 2021, 2018, 2014,2012, 2011, 2009, 2004 - The Banker /Financial Times/
- "Best bank in Mongolia" 2023, 2015, 2013, 2012 /Global Finance/
- "Best bank in Mongolia" 2023, 2011 /Euromoney/
- “Best SME bank in Mongolia” 2022, 2021 /Asiamoney/
- "Best Digital bank in Mongolia" 2024, 2023, 2022, 2021, 2020, 2019, 2015, 2014, 2013, 2012 /Global Finance/
- "Best Corporate Bank in Mongolia" 2026, 2021 /Global Banking & Finance Review /
- "Great Place to Work Awards" 2026, 2025, 2024, 2023, 2022 /Great Place to Work/

== See also ==
- Bank of Mongolia
