= XacBank =

Mongolian banking company

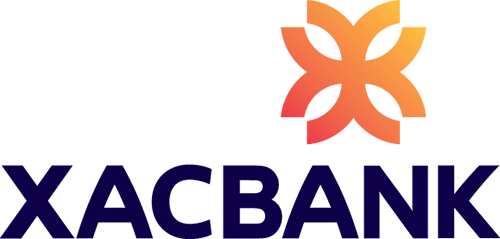

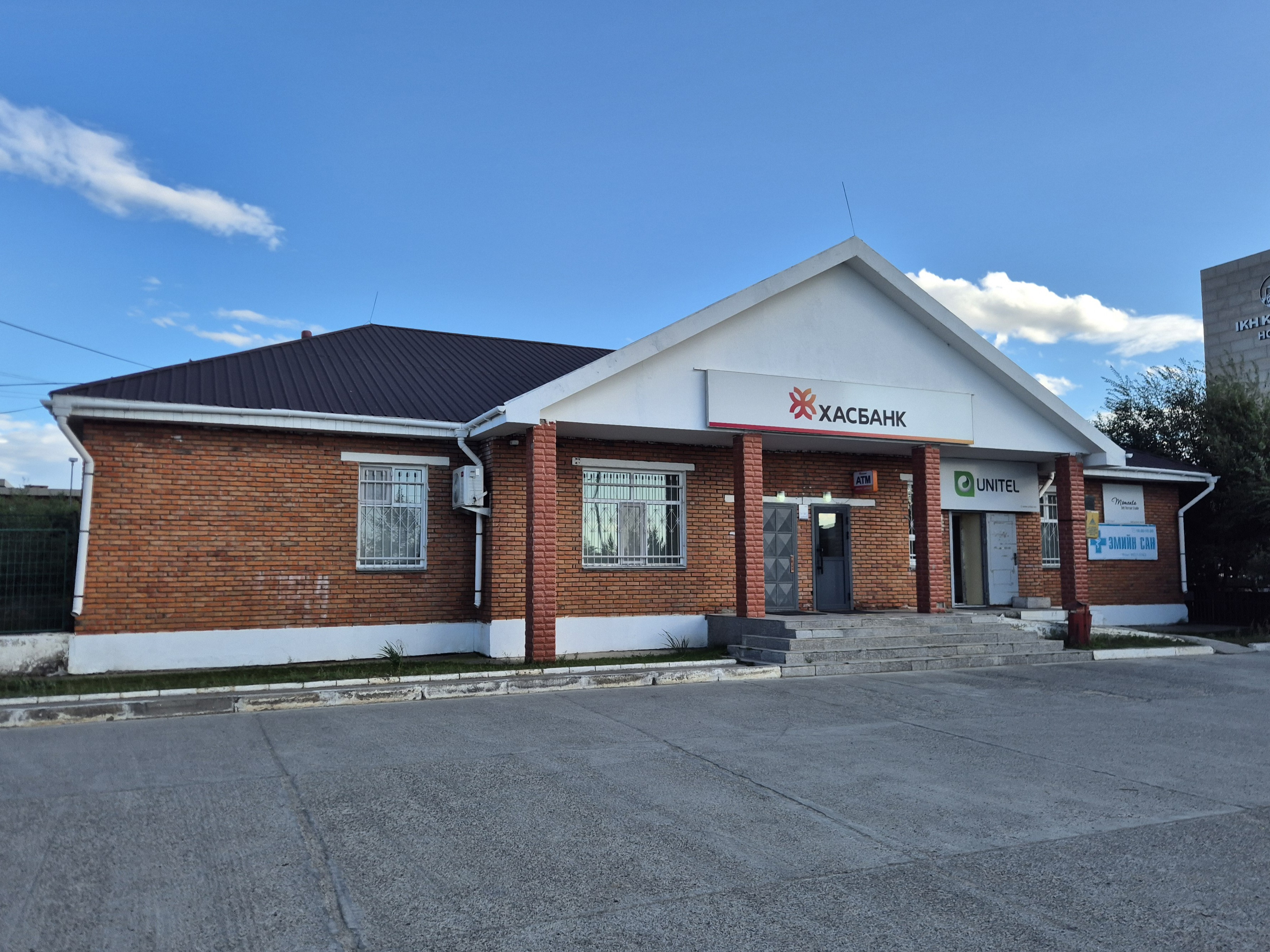
- Industry: Retail banking
- Founded: 2001
- Headquarters: Ulaanbataar, Mongolia
- Key people: Tsevegjav Gumenjav (CEO)
- Services: Banking
- Website: Official website

XacBank (Mongolian: ХасБанк) is a Mongolian banking and financial services company headquartered in Ulaanbaatar. XacBank was founded in 2001 following the merger of Goviin Ekhlel LLC and X.A.C. LLC, the two largest non-banking financial institutes in Mongolia. XacBank is organized into three main business groups: Retail Banking; Business Banking; and Corporate Banking. XacBank currently has a branch network of 86 retail and two business service branches, along with digital channels including ATMs, internet and mobile banking serving 700,000 customers in Mongolia. XacBank is owned by TenGer Financial Group LLC.

== History ==
=== 1998–2001 ===
XacBank was established in late 2001 as a result of merger of the two largest non-banking financial institutes in Mongolia, Goviin Ekhlel LLC and X.A.C LLC. XacBank was the first non-banking financial institute in Mongolia to receive a banking license from the Bank of Mongolia, which is the nation's is central bank. Goviin Ekhlel LCC was established by Mercy Corps in December 1999 with funding from the United States Agency for International Development as a non-banking financial institute serving small and medium-sized enterprises. X.A.C. LLC began in 1998 under the Micro Start Mongolia Project under United Nations Development Program and later transformed into Mongolia’s first non-banking financial institution by uniting the financial services activities of six local NGOs. It is also seen as the first green bank in Mongolia.

=== 2001–10 ===
After its establishment, in 2002 XacBank established a presence in every Mongolian province. XacBank introduced the “Future Millionaire” children’s savings which later became a National Brand serving approximately a fifth of children in Mongolia. In 2004, International Finance Corporation invested in XacBank, the first Mongolian commercial institution to receive such funding. The bank joined the Global Reporting Initiative and United Nations Global Compact principles to improve its corporate transparency and social responsibility. It has been named as one of the top 100 microfinance institutions globally by Forbes magazine in 2007. In 2008, XacBank launched ATM, internet and message banking services. In 2009, XacBank expanded outside Mongolia when it invested in Molbulak Microfinance Institution in Kyrgyzstan.

=== 2020s ===
XacBank conducted its IPO on 25 May 2023.

== See also ==
- List of banks
- List of banks in Mongolia
