= Trade and Development Bank of Mongolia =

Bank of Mongolia

Trade and Development Bank

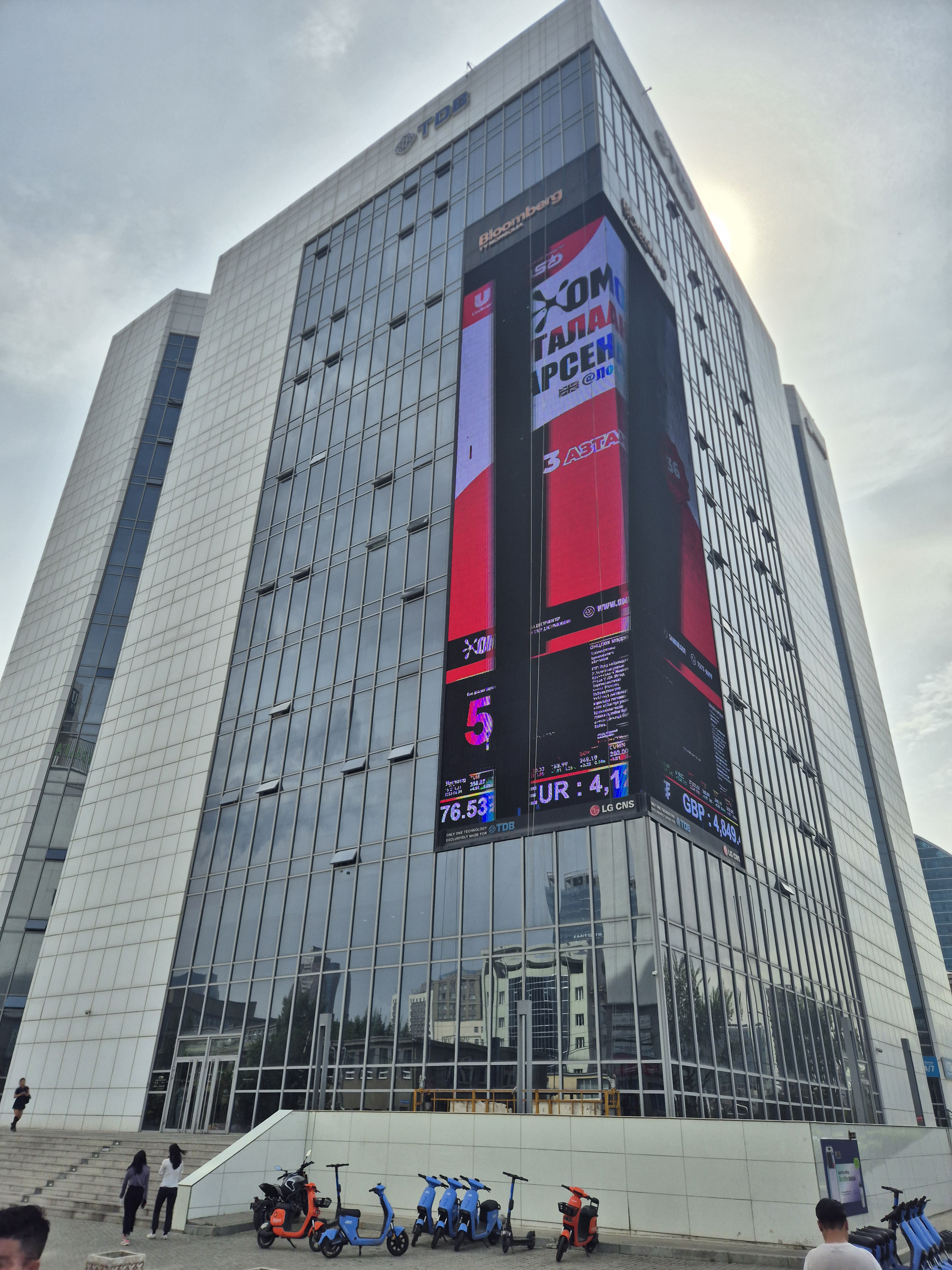
- TDB headquarters in Ulaanbaatar, Mongolia
- Company type: Private
- Industry: Banking, Financial services
- Founded: October 19, 1990
- Headquarters: Ulaanbaatar, Mongolia
- Area served: Mongolia
- Key people: R.Koppa (Chairman) O.Orkhon (CEO) O.Banzragch (First Deputy CEO) A.Enkhmend (First Deputy CEO) S.Baatar (Deputy CEO) Ts.Ganbayar (Deputy CEO)
- Products: Credit cards, consumer banking, corporate banking, finance and insurance, investment banking
- Net income: ₮ 238.1 billion (2019)
- Total assets: ₮ 7,803.0 billion (2019)
- Number of employees: 1893 employees
- Website: Official website

The Trade and Development Bank (TDB) of Mongolia (Mongolian: Худалдаа Хөгжлийн Банк, Khudaldaa Khögzhliĭn Bank) is a commercial bank located in Ulaanbaatar. It is the oldest, as well as one of the largest banks in Mongolia. It was founded in October 1990 and currently has a total of 97 branches throughout the country.

The Trade and Development Bank of Mongolia LLC is a Mongolian domiciled limited liability company first permitted to conduct banking activities on May 29, 1993. Its current banking license was renewed on February 27, 2002.
