= List of Mongolian composers =

Mongolia features a rich tradition of classical music and ballet. The classical music owes its prosperity in the 2nd half of the 20th century to a patronage of the then Socialist government that favoured Western and Russian/Soviet classical arts to Western pop culture. In addition, the Mongolian composers developed a rich diversity of national symphony and ballet.

Name (Awards)	Key Works
Enkhtaivan Agvaantseren (УГЗ, People's Artist)	Music for the film a Pearl in the Forest; Melodies of Mongolia
Gaadangiin Altankhuyag (УГЗ)	Symphonies; Opera Mother Hoelun (Өэлүн эх дуурь); Song The beauty of the Mongolian woman (Монгол бүсгүйн үзэсгэлэн)
Luvsanjambyn Mördorj (УГЗ)	The National anthem of Mongolia; Music for film The golden yurt (Алтан өргөө); Symphony The birds in spring (Хаврын шувууд); Torghut dance (Торгууд бүжиг) won awards at the World Festival of Youth and Students in 1947; Dance Eerentseg (Ээрэнцэг бүжиг) won awards at the World Festival of Youth and Students in 1947; Music for film Wish I had a horse (Морьтой ч болоосой); Opera Namjil nicknamed cuckoo (Хөхөө Намжил); Music for film Oh, these girls! (Энэ хүүхдүүд үү); Symphony My motherland (Миний эх орон); Song Steppe in four seasons (Дөрвөн цагийн тал)
Byambasuren Sharav	Cantata The sun over the wonderful Jambudvipa (Уяхан замбутивийн нар); Symphony Melody of the soul (Сэтгэлийн эгшиг); Opera Genghis Khan (Чингис хаан дуурь)
Jamyangiin Chuluun	Ballet The skillful master Khas (Уран Хас); Variation of two folk melodies (Ардын хоёр дууны вариац)
Bilegiin Damdinsüren	National anthem; Symphony In the upland of Khentii (Хэнтийн өндөр ууланд); Opera The three tragic hills (Учиртай гурван толгой); Opera The road to happiness (Жаргалын зам дуурь)
Natsagiin Jantsannorov (Тєрийн шагналт)	Music for film Queen Mandukhai the Wise (Мандухай Сэцэн Хатун); Music for film Under the power of the eternal heavens (Мөнх Тэнгэрийн Хүчин дор); Symphonette; Symphony The white stupa (Цагаан суварга); Symphony The eight bay horses (Найман шарга)
Tsegmidiin Namsraijav	Symphony The mountains Gobi Gurvan Saikhan (Говь гурван сайхан); Symphony Celebrity of magnificence (Баярын жавхаа); Song The country in the heart (Халуун элгэн нутаг)
Eregzengiin Choidog	Symphony The beautiful country of Mongolia (Монголын сайхан орон); Dance The black ambler (Жалам хар); Song Mother of mine (Миний ээж)
Sembiin Gonchigsumlaa	Buryat dance (Буриад бүжиг); Symphonies
