= Military Band of the General Staff of the Armed Forces of Mongolia =

Musical unit in Mongolia

- Монгол Улсын Зэвсэгт хүчний жанжин штабын үлгэр жишээ үлээвэр найрал хөгжим
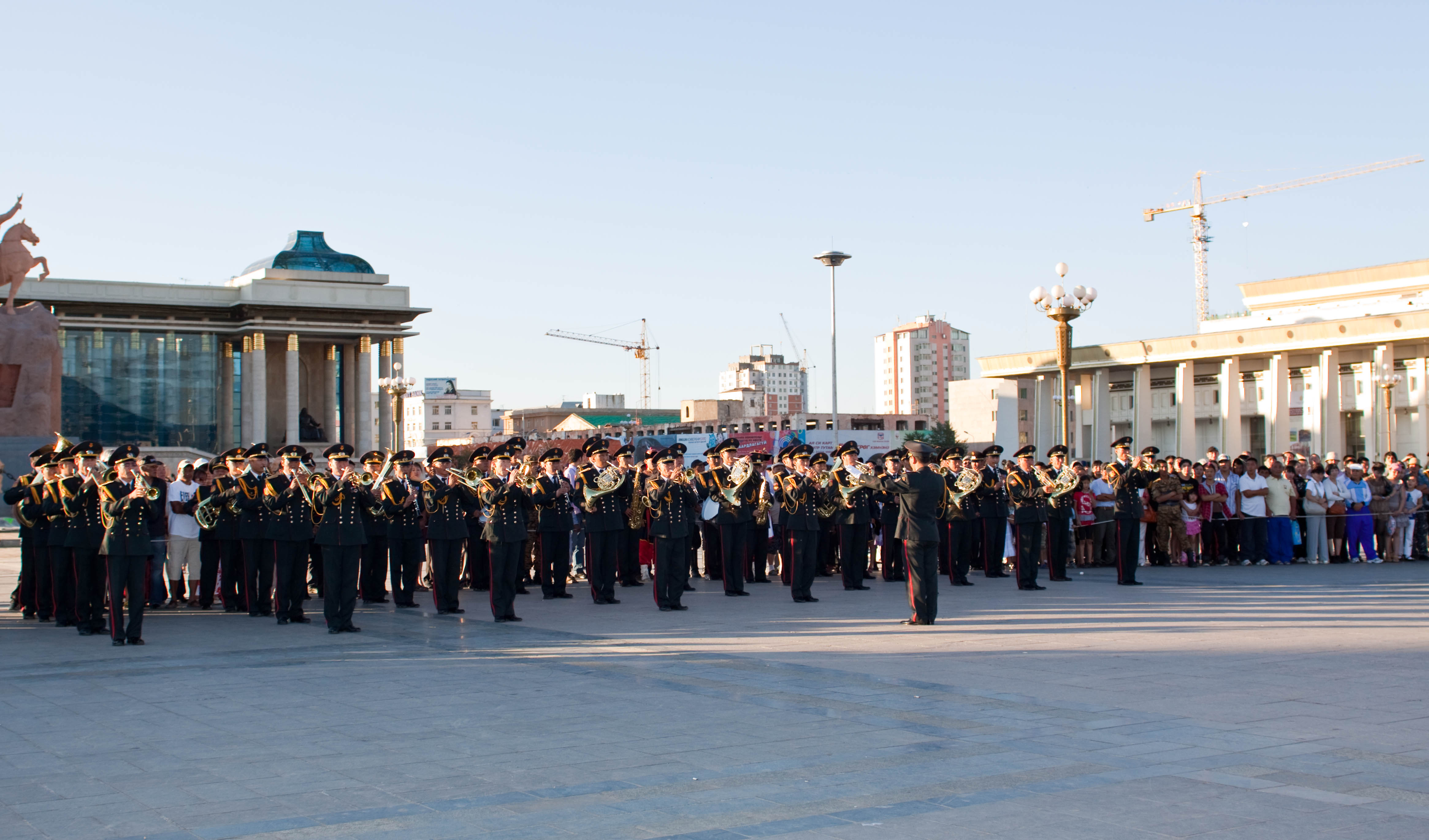
- The MAF Band conducted by Captain E. Gansukh performing traditional music during a concert in June 2010.
- Active: 1950; 76 years ago
- Country: Mongolia
- Branch: Mongolian Ground Force
- Type: Military Band
- Part of: General Staff
- Band Headquarters: Ulaanbaatar
- Nickname: MAF Band

Commanders
- Commanding Officer and Senior Director of Music: Colonel Chojilzhav Gansukh

The Military Band of the General Staff of the Armed Forces of Mongolia (also known as the Band of the Armed Forces of Mongolia or the MAF Band) is the main military band of the Armed Forces of Mongolia. The band was formed in 1950 and began as the foremost musical group of the Mongolian People's Army. It was led for over 30 years by Colonel Navaany Tserenpil who drastically changed the band's style and structure to reflect the Russian model. Tserenpil, who wrote over 100 marches for the band, is known as the Mongolian March King. Today, the MAF Band participates in receptions dedicated to state holidays, parades, and accompanies the visits of heads of state and government to Mongolia.

== Founding director ==
Colonel Navaany Tserenpil (Mongolian: Навааны Цэрэнпил) was a Mongolian musician and military leader who was the longtime head of the Music Department of the Mongolian People's Army. Being a conductor and composer, Colonel Tserenpil was an Honored Worker of Mongolia, and was one of the most famous musical figures of the 20th century in Mongolia. He was born on October 15, 1915, in Khoroo in the Selenge Province, spending his early childhood in poverty, becoming a sawyer age of 14. He enlisted in the army in 1936 and became a soldier in a Special Committee of the Ministry of Internal Affairs. He later joined the music service, and after a couple of year was promoted to head of the music department. Tserenpil was awarded the rank of lieutenant on May 1, 1940. He was the music director until 1945. He was awarded the title of "Honored Artist of the People's Republic of Mongolia" by the Presidium of the Great People's Khural in 1961 on the occasion of the 40th anniversary of the People's Army. Colonel Tserenpil died on August 2, 1978, after nearly 40 years of service.

== Directors ==
The Senior Director of Music of the Military Band Service of the Armed Forces has been the commanding officer of the band in a concurrent capacity:

- Colonel Navaany Tserenpil (-1972)
- Colonel Pürevjavyn Khayankhyarvaa (1972-1978)
- Colonel J. Dendev (1978-1991)
- Lieutenant Colonel Tumurbat Tsedensodnom (c. 2010 - 2015)
- Colonel Chojilzhav Gansukh (since 2015)

== Events ==
=== Domestic ===
- Annual Mongolian State Flag Day parades on Sükhbaatar Square
- Soldiers Day and Independence Day celebrations
- Anniversaries of the Battle of Khalkin Gol
- Naadam festivals
- Ceremonial activities with the Mongolian State Honor Guard during State visits by heads of state and government to Mongolia
- Public concerts in the country (sometimes with the Military Music College of Mongolia)

Under the communist regime, the band performed during the 35th, 40th, 45th, and 50th anniversary parades in honor of the Mongolian Revolution of 1921. The band has engaged with foreign units such as the United States Air Force Band of the Pacific and the Marine Forces Pacific Band on Mongolian soil during their tours of the country.

=== Foreign ===
- Edinburgh Tattoo in Edinburgh, Scotland (2013)
- Spasskaya International Tattoo in Moscow, Russia (2015)
- International Military Band and Honor Guard Festival in Jinhae, South Korea (2016)
- The Amur Waves International Military Bands Festival in Khabarovsk, Russia (2016)
- Hong Kong International Military Tattoo (2017)

=== Gallery of events ===
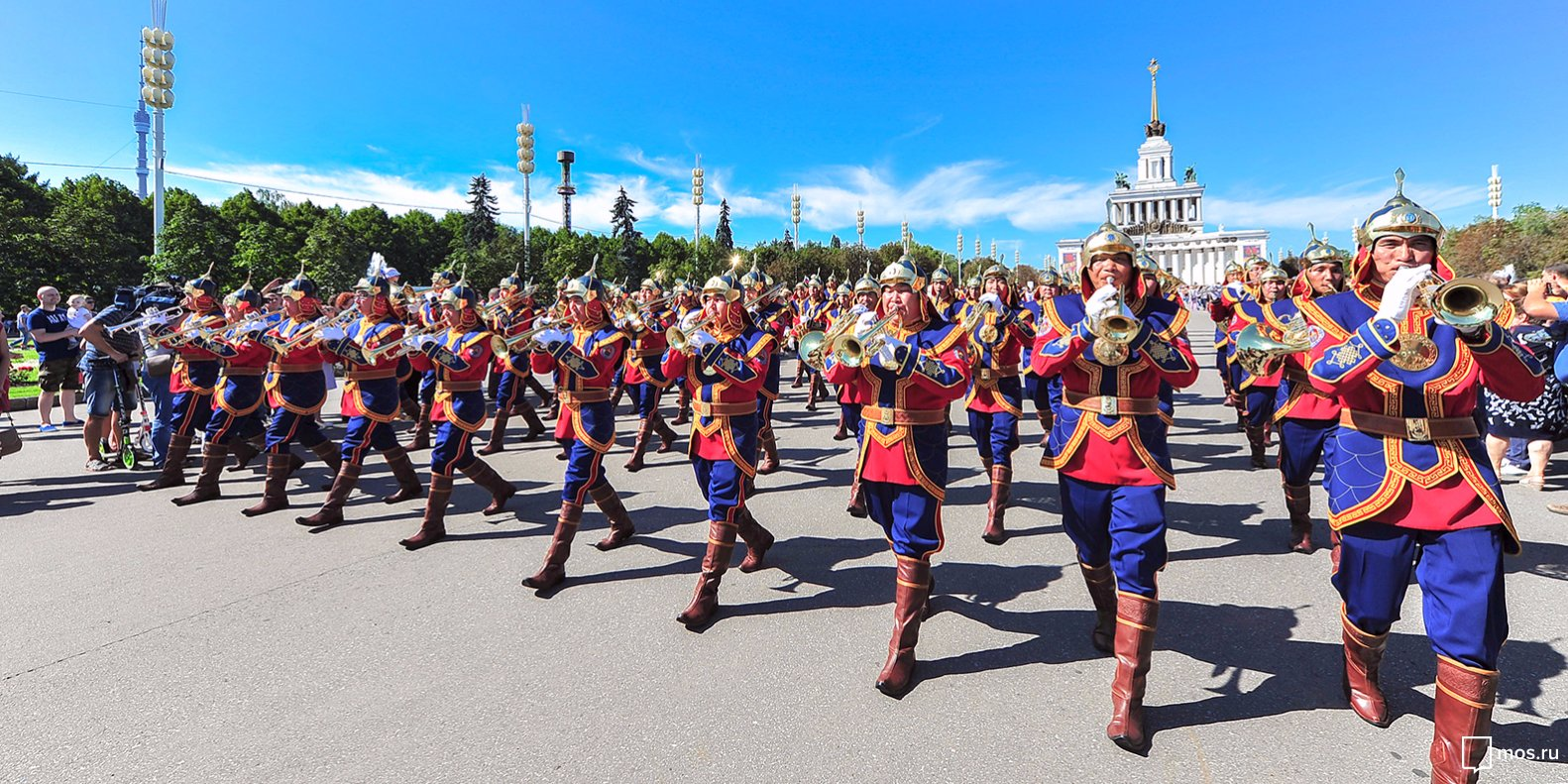
The band in its traditional uniform.

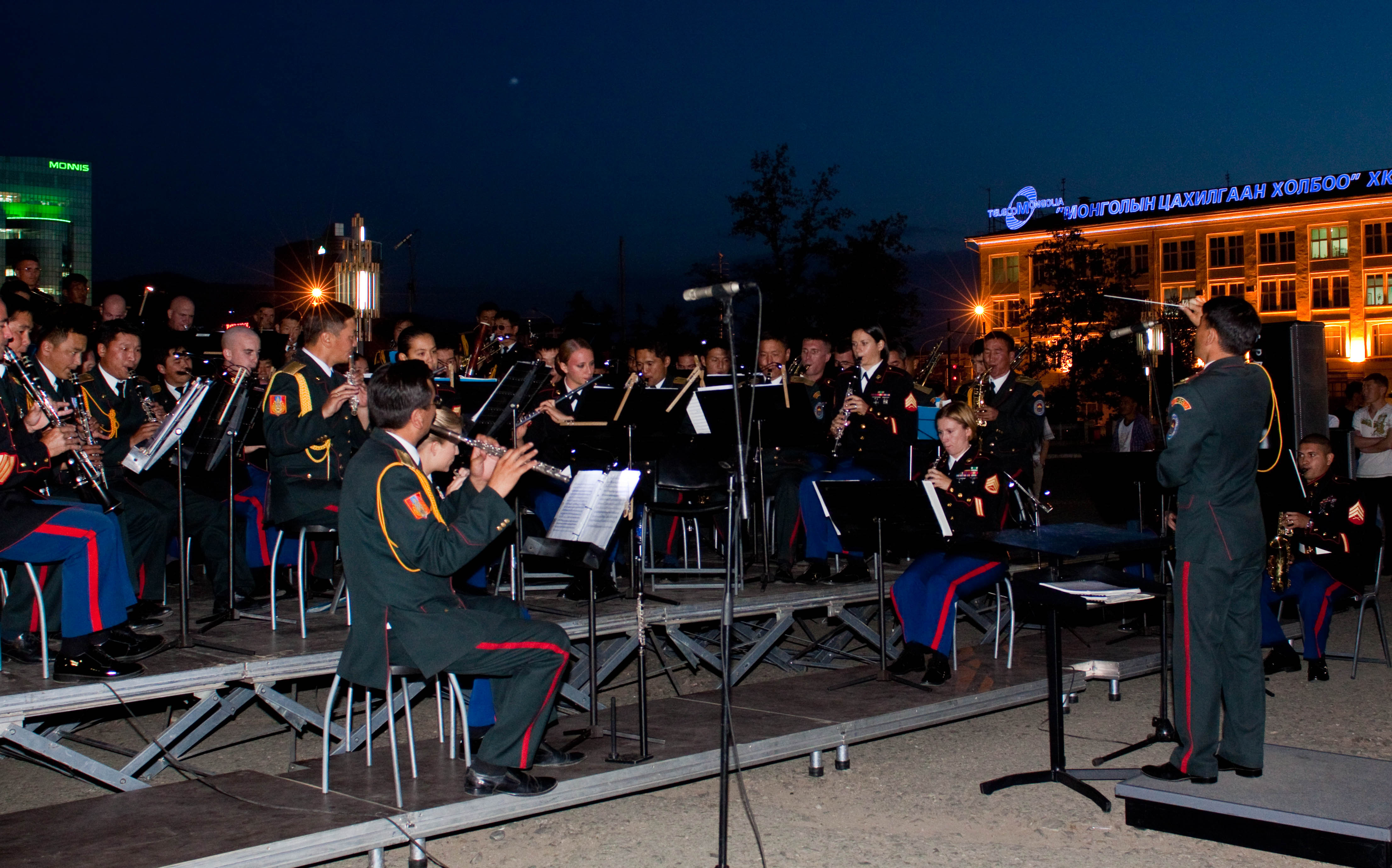
Lieutenant Colonel Tumurbat Tsedensodnom leads the United States Marine Corps Forces, Pacific Band and the MAF Band during a public concert at Sukhbaatar Square in 2010.

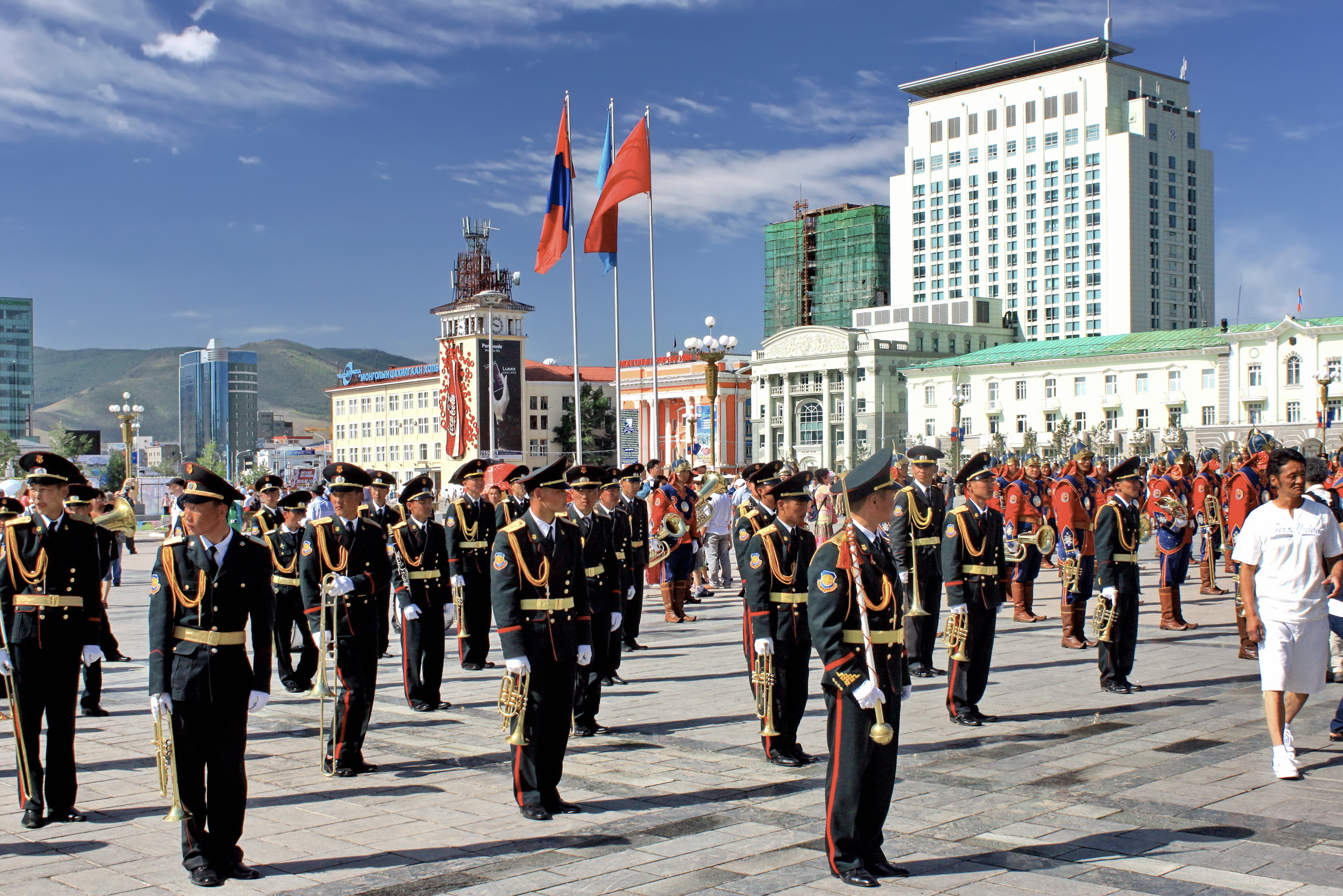
The band during the 2010 Ulan-Bator Naadam festival.

== Repertoire ==
- National Anthem of Mongolia (Монгол Улсын төрийн дуулал)
- The Red Banner March (Тугийн марш)
- March "Honor of Mongolian People's Army" (Гуравдугаар сар "Монголын Ардын Армийг хүндлэх")
- Historic Boundary (Түүхт Хил)
- Alkhaad March (Алхаад марш)
- July 11th March (7-р сарын 11-ний марш)
- Glory to the Capital (Нийслэлийн алдар марш)
- Welcome the Flag March (Туг угтах марш)
- Song of Khalkhin Gol (Халхын голын дуу)

Many of the band's repertoire are holdovers from the communist era.

== See also ==
- Military Music College of Mongolia
- Mongolian Military Song and Dance Academic Ensemble
