= Mongolian State Flag Day =

National holiday

Mongolian State Flag Day Монгол Улсын Төрийн далбааны өдөр
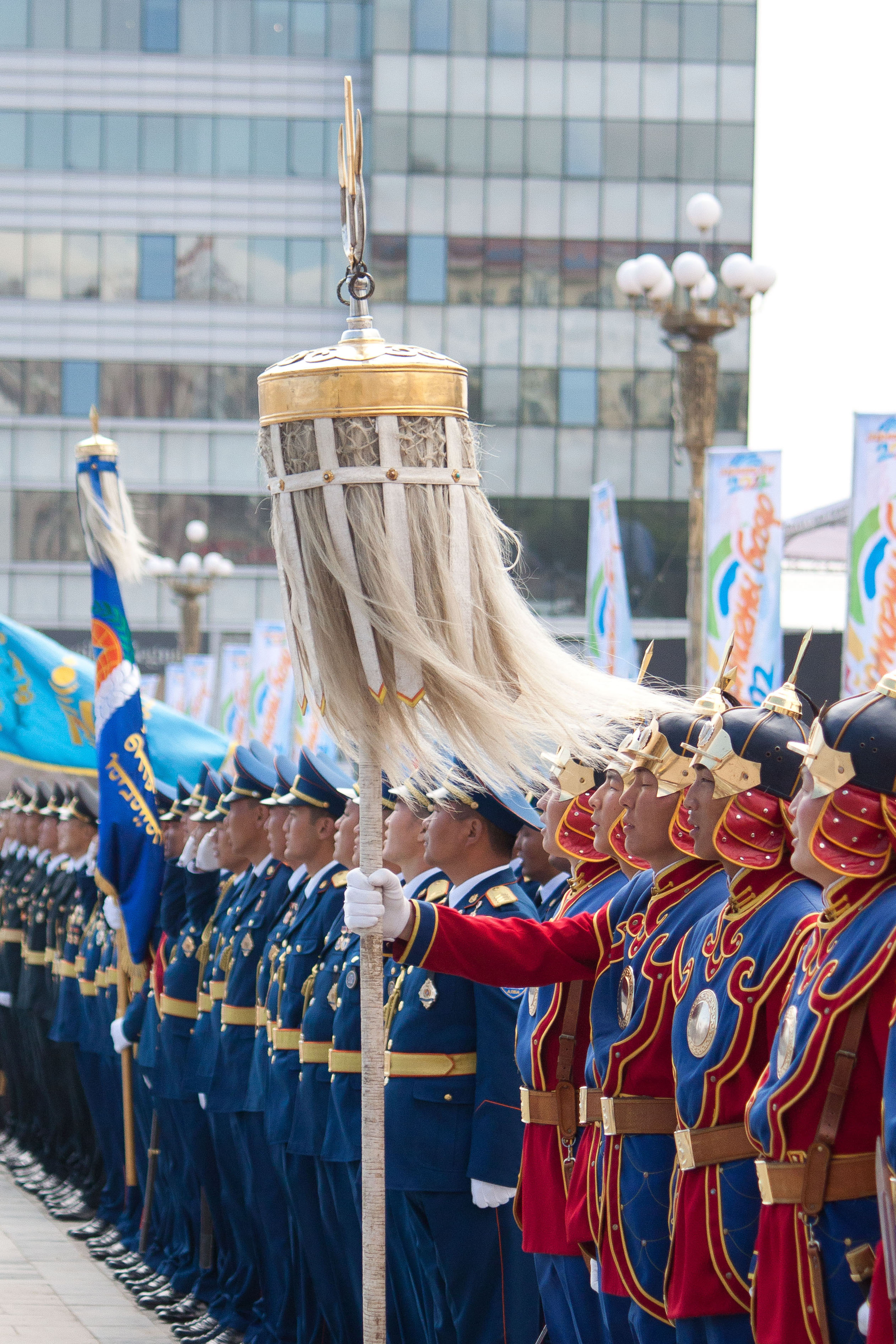
- The Mongolian State Honor Guard holding the White Tug of the Mongols on Sukhbaatar Square, State Flag Day 2012.
- Observed by: Mongolia
- Type: State
- Significance: Honors the Flag of Mongolia as well as other historical achievements.
- Celebrations: Fireworks, Concerts, Parades
- Date: July 10
- Next time: 10 July 2027
- Frequency: annual

State Flag Day (Mongolian: Төрийн далбааны өдөр) is the a state holiday in Mongolia. Since 2009, it has been celebrated annually on July 10, a day prior to the Naadam festival. State Flag Day is celebrated with a central government-sponsored events including a military parade and a flag raising ceremony on Sükhbaatar Square in the capital of Ulaanbaatar.

== History ==
=== Previous celebrations on 10 July ===
The first official military parade in Communist Mongolia (Mongolian People's Republic) took place in 1921 in honor of the victories of Damdin Sükhbaatar in the People's Revolution. The anniversary parades that followed have been held on jubilee years, examples of which include the parades in 1966, 1981, and 1991 which celebrated the 45th anniversary, the 60th anniversary and the 70th anniversary respectively. After 1991, the practice was abandoned with the exception of 1996 when a parade in the National Sports Stadium commemorated the 790th anniversary of the founding of Mongolia and the 75th anniversary of the People's Revolution.

Many of the celebrations were celebrated with the participation of foreign communists who visited the country, including Mikhail Suslov, Józef Cyrankiewicz, and Władysław Gomułka.

=== Today ===
In 2008, three MPs in the State Great Khural passed a law on the establishment of State Flag Day. The grounds for this holiday's selection was on the order of Marshal Khorloogiin Choibalsan on 10 July 1945 to revise the provisions in the "Law on the Design and Composition of the State Flag" at the 43rd Meeting of the State Little Khural of the Mongolian People’s Republic. As a result of its approval by the Bayar government, State Flag Day was celebrated for the first time on July 10 the following year during the inauguration of President Tsakhiagiin Elbegdorj. Although officially celebrating the National Flag of Mongolia, it also commemorates the anniversaries of Mongolian Statehood and the Mongol Empire, the establishment of the Bogd Khanate in the Qing dynasty, the People's Revolution of 1921 and the Democratic Revolution of 1990. It also coincides with the traditional Mongolian celebration of Naadam, which begins the following day, 11 July.

== Summary of the Military Parade ==
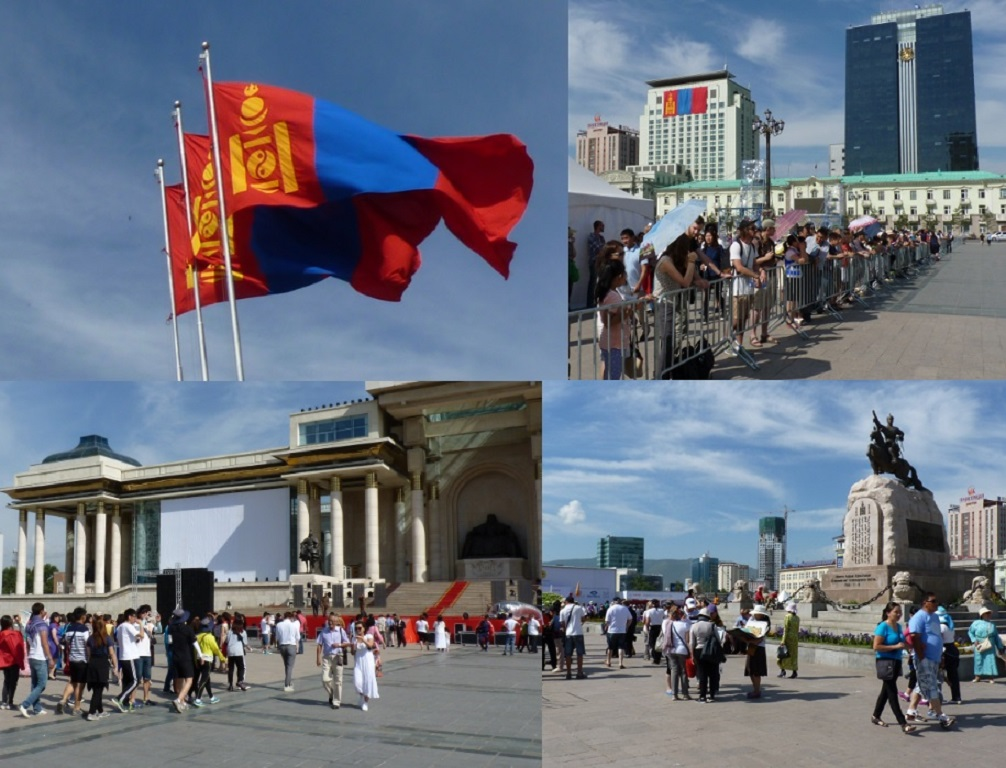
People on the square during State Flag Day in 2014.

The annual military parade of Mongolian Armed Forces on the southern part of Sükhbaatar Square is the main event during State Flag Day. The parade has been held since 2009, and is presided by the President of Mongolia in his/her capacity as Commander in Chief of the MAF.

The ceremonies begin as the president steps out of the Government Palace to be received at the saluting base by the Speaker of the State Great Khural, the Prime Minister, the Minister of Defense, as well as members of the government and the General Staff of the Mongolian Armed Forces. As the President receives the salute, then a car carrying a color guard from the National Defense University takes its place in the parade to the tune of the Tugiin March. After a fanfare by the combined massed bands of the Ulaanbaatar garrison provided by the Military Band of the General Staff of the Armed Forces of Mongolia and the Brass Band of the Military Music College of Mongolia of the NDU, the Minister of Defense arrives in the center of the square to receive the report from the Chief of the General Staff of the MAF, on the status of the parade and its readiness for inspection. As the Minister's vehicle pass the mobile column of the parade, and then the battalions of the parade ground column (as the massed bands play music) he/she greets the formations and congratulates them on the holiday. Once the minister and the parade commander finish their inspection, the minister's vehicle heads to the saluting base to greet the president and give his/her ceremonial report on the parade's readiness to march off. Following this, the National Anthem of Mongolia is played by the band as the national flag is raised.

Following a threefold Urra by the armed forces, the parade commander orders the parade formations to stand at attention and to move their colours and commanders to the front of their formation for the march past. Once the commander orders the parade to march in quick time with the command Eyes on the right, quick march!, the Corps of Drums of the Military Music College, march to a tune being played by the drummers and fifers. By the signal of the Corps Drum Major, massed bands start playing and the corps stops and swings its drumsticks while their eyes are on the right.

The Corps of Drums are then immediately followed by cadets from the NDU, who are then followed by the parade formations participating in the parade, ending with the Mongolian State Honor Guard Battalion. The parade consists of officers and personnel of the various units and service academies of the military, as well as the General Authority for Border Protection, the Internal Troops, and the National Emergency Management Agency.

== Other actions and activities ==
=== Awards ceremony ===
The preceding day, an awards ceremony is held in the Chamber of Nine White Banners of the Government Palace. The following awards and titles are conferred upon individuals during the ceremony:

- Order of Genghis Khan
- Order of the Precious Wand
- Order of Sukhbaatar
- Hero of Labor
- State Prize Laureate
- People’s Artist
- Honoured Worker

=== Wreath laying ceremony ===
After the parade, a wreath laying ceremony is held at the monuments to Damdin Sukhbaatar (the founding member of the Mongolian People's Party) and Chinggis Khaan (the first Great Khan of the Mongol Empire).

=== Naadam festival ===
During the commemorative Naadam festival that takes place the next day, a traditional opening ceremony is held at the National Sports Stadium in the presence of the President, which includes a military parade. Nine different traditional White Tugs of the Mongols are the somewhat centerpiece of the ceremony, while all attendees are encouraged to wear traditional Mongolian cultural clothing.

== See also ==
- Public holidays in Mongolia
- Mongolian General Purpose Force
- Mongolian Air Force
- Military band
