= Tsendiin Damdinsüren =

Mongolian writer and linguist (1908–1986)

- Цэндийн Дамдинсүрэн (Mongolian)
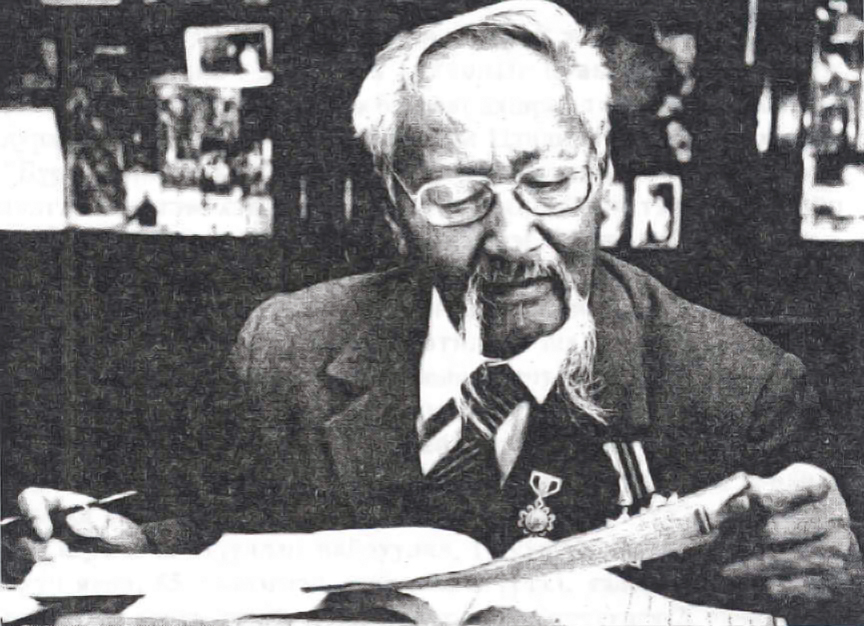
- Damdinsüren in 1969
- Born: 14 September 1908; Matad, Outer Mongolia, Qing China
- Died: 27 May 1986 (aged 77); Ulaanbaatar, Mongolian People's Republic
- Citizenship: Mongolian
- Occupations: Writer, linguist
- Writing career
- Language: Mongolian
- Notable work: The Secret History of the Mongols (translation into modern language)

Tsendiin Damdinsüren (Mongolian: Цэндийн Дамдинсүрэн; (Note: Mongolian pronunciation: [t͡sʰentiːn tamtinsuren]) 14 September 1908 – 27 May 1986) was a Mongolian writer and linguist. He wrote the text to one version of the national anthem of Mongolia.

== Life ==
Damdinsüren was born in Mongolia 1908, in what is today the Dornod Aimag (province).

As a young man, he was politically active in the Mongolian Revolutionary Youth League, where he was elected into the Central Committee in 1926, and eventually became an editor of its publications. Later he became the chairman of the Council of Mongolian Trade Unions and was involved in the collectivization and seizures. He joined the MPRP in 1932. In 1933 he continued his education in Leningrad.

After returning to Mongolia in 1938, Damdinsüren became an ally of Yumjaagiin Tsedenbal, the future party secretary, Prime Minister, and President. He promoted the switch from the vertically written classical Mongolian script to an adapted Cyrillic script. Between 1942 and 1946 he was an editor for the party newspaper Ünen (The Truth). In 1959 he became chairman of the Committee of Sciences, and between 1953 and 1955 he was chairman of the Writers Union.

== Works ==
Damdinsüren wrote poetry that was well received in Mongolia. He also produced prose and literary studies, and a translation of The Secret History of the Mongols into modern Mongolian. The language of his poems and prose was largely based on the oral literary traditions of Mongolia, which he developed into a classical language of the Mongolian literature of the 20th century. His novel Gologdson Khüükhen (Гологдсон хүүхэн, The Rejected Girl) became one of the popular films of the 1960s.

He created the first large Russian–Mongolian dictionary and wrote the text to the national anthem that was in use between 1950 and 1962, and in parts after 1991.

== See also ==
- Culture of Mongolia
- Ryenchinii Choinom
