= Luvsanjambyn Mördorj =

Mongolian composer

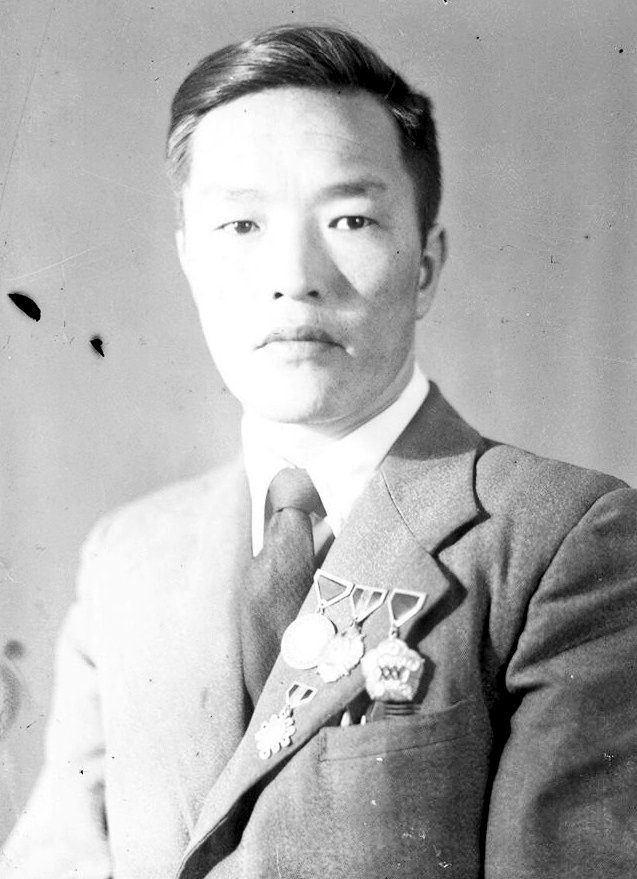
- Born: 15 September 1919; Niislel Khüree, Bogd Khanate of Mongolia
- Died: 1996

Luvsanjambyn Mördorj (Mongolian: Лувсанжамбын Мөрдорж; 15 September 1919–1996) was a Mongolian composer.

He was one of the leading composers of Mongolia in the 1950s and 1960

His symphonic work My Homeland, also known as Manai Ekh Oron (Our Motherland), composed in 1955, was the first such work written in Mongolia. He was also a co-composer of the national anthem of Mongolia. He was cited as belonging to “the nineteenth century European school of composers" who along with the other Mongolian composers Sembiin Gonchigsumlaa and Eregzengiin Choidog drew inspiration from composers such as Tchaikovsky and Mahler.
