= Mongol Internationale =

Former national anthem of Mongolia (1924–1950)

Монгол Интернационал ᠮᠣᠩᠭᠣᠯ ᠢᠨᠲ᠋ᠧᠷᠨᠠᠼᠢᠤᠨᠠᠯ
English: Mongol Internationale
- Former anthem of Mongolia
- Lyrics: Sonombalshiriin Bujannemech
- Music: Magsarshaviin Durgarshav
- Adopted: 1924
- Relinquished: 1950
- Preceded by: "Zuun Langiin Joroo Luus"
- Succeeded by: State Anthem of the Mongolian People's Republic

Audio sample
- Abridged MIDI of the Mongol Internationale in G minor: file; help

The Mongol Internationale (Mongolian: Монгол Интернационал) was the first national anthem of the Mongolian People's Republic from 1924 to 1950.

== History ==
Following the Mongolian Revolution of 1921, communists were successful in gaining power and subsequently founded the Mongolian People's Republic in 1924. With concurrent revolutions in Russia and Tuva also succeeding, the RSFSR and TAR were formed, respectively, as well.

The former would join with three other republics to form the Soviet Union, adopting "The Internationale" (a popular proletarian internationalist song that was and is still used by a wide range of left-wing and anti-capitalist movements) as its national anthem. In honour of this, composers in Tuva and Mongolia created the Tuvan Internationale and Mongol Internationale, respectively.

Despite the Mongol Internationale being similar to "The Internationale" in title, the melody is quite different and unique. Despite this, it and the "Tuvan Internationale" frequently get confused for Mongolian or Tuvan versions of "The Internationale". "The Internationale" does actually have a Mongolian version, however, which should not be confused with the "Mongol Internationale". The only things this song and the original Internationale have in common is the name and both having a communist background.

== Lyrics ==
Original text

Бүх дэлхийн aрд түмэнд
Бүрэн эрхийг олгогч Интернационал!
Бүдүүлэг ядуу ард түмнийг
Гэгээнээр удирдагч интернационал

Хамаг дэлхийн ядуу ардыг
Харанхуйгаар мөлжигч харгисуудыг
Хашин арилгахаар эсэргүүцсэн
Хасын замтай интернационал

Гэмгүй суусан орчлонг
Гэмтүүлэн дарлагч капиталтанг
Хийсгэн арилгахаар эсэргүүцсэн
Гэгээн мөртэй интернационал

Гайхамшигт жавхлант улаан тугаар
Газрын бөмбөрцгийг бүрхээд
Гал усны гашуун зовлонгоос гэтэлгэгч
Гайхамшигт гуравдугаар интернационал

Дорно өрнийн олон тив дэх
Доромжлогдсон дарлагдсан ард түмэн
Даруйхан бүгдээрээ босоцгоож
Догшин харгисуудыг дарцгаагтун

Баялаг ноёдуудын эрх мэдэлд
Балбагдан дарлагдсан ард түмэн
Багын хайран наснаасаа
Үйлдвэрт зүтгэсэн ард түмэн

Эдгээр олон зовлонтон нар
Эв хамтын интернационалд нэгдэж
Эрчимтэй ангийн чанарыг баримтлан
Эзэрхэг баячуудыг эсэргүүцье

Жаргалант байдлыг зохион чадагч
Жавхлант туг юугаа байгуулсан
Журамт эв хамт намуудын
Журам холбоот интернационал

Гэгээн тунгалаг эрдэм соёлоор
Дөрвөн зүгтээ цэцэг дэлгэж
Гэрэлт нарны эрдэнийн туяагаар
Ертөнц дахиныг гийгүүлэх болтугай

Энэхүү дэлхийн ард түмнийг
Эрхбиш нэгтгэх зорилготой
Эв хамтын гуравдугаар интернационал
Үүрд наран мэт мандах болтугай

Bükh delkhiin ard tümend
Büren erkhiig olgogch Intiernacional!
Büdüüleg yaduu ard tümniig
Gegeeneer udirdagch intiernacional

Khamag delkhiin yaduu ardiig
Kharankhuigaar möljigch khargisuudiig
Khashin arilgakhaar esergüücsen
Khasiin zamtai intiernacional

Gemgüi suusan orchlong
Gemtüülen darlagch kapitaltang
Khiisgen arilgakhaar esergüücsen
Gegeen mörtei intiernacional

Gaikhamshigt javkhlant ulaan tugaar
Gazriin bömbörcgiig bürkheed
Gal usnii gaskhuun zovlongoos getelgegch
Gaikhamshigt guravdugaar intiernacional

Dorno örniin olon tiv dekh
Doromjlogdson darlagdsan ard tümen
Daruikhan bügdeeree bosocgooj
Dogshin khargisuudïg darcgaagtun

Bayalag noyoduudiin erkh medeld
Balbagdan darlagdsan ard tümen
Bagiin khairan nasnaasaa
Üildvert zütgesen ard tümen

Edgeer olon zovlonton nar
Ev khamtiin intiernacionald negdej
Erchimtei angiin chanariig barimtlan
Ezerkheg bayachuudiig esergüüciyö

Jargalant baidliig zokhion chadagch
Javkhlant tug yuugaa baiguulsan
Juramt ev khamt namuudiin
Juram kholboot intiernacional

Gegeen tungalag erdem soyoloor
Dörvön zügtee ceceg delgej
Gerelt narnii erdeniin tuyaagaar
Yörtönc dakhiniig giigüülekh boltugai

Enekhüü delkhiin ard tümniig
Erkhbish negtgekh zorilgotoi
Ev khamtiin guravdugaar intiernacional
Üürd naran met mandakh boltugai

Classical Mongolian text

ᠪᠦᠬᠦ ᠳᠡᠯᠡᠬᠡᠢ ᠶᠢᠨ ᠠᠷ ᠲᠤ ᠲᠦᠮᠡᠨ ᠳᠦ ᠪᠦᠷᠢᠨ ᠡᠷᠬᠡ ᠶᠢ ᠣᠯᠭᠤᠭᠴᠢ ᠢᠨᠲ᠋ᠧᠷᠨᠠᠼᠢᠤᠨᠠᠯ!
ᠪᠦᠳᠦᠭᠦᠯᠢᠭ ᠶᠠᠳᠠᠭᠤ ᠠᠷᠠᠳ ᠲᠦᠮᠡᠨ ᠢ ᠭᠡᠭᠡᠨ ᠢᠶᠡᠷ ᠤᠳᠤᠷᠢᠳᠤᠭᠴᠢ ᠢᠨᠲ᠋ᠧᠷᠨᠠᠼᠢᠤᠨᠠᠯ!

ᠬᠠᠮᠤᠭ ᠳᠡᠯᠡᠬᠡᠢ ᠶᠢᠨ ᠶᠠᠳᠠᠭᠤ ᠠᠷᠠᠳ ᠢ ᠬᠠᠷᠠᠩᠭᠤᠢ ᠪᠠᠷ ᠮᠥᠯᠵᠢᠭᠴᠢ ᠬᠠᠷᠭᠢᠰ ᠤᠳ ᠢ ᠬᠠᠱᠠᠩ ᠠᠷᠢᠯᠭᠠᠬᠤ ᠪᠠᠷ ᠡᠰᠡᠷᠭᠦᠴᠡᠭᠰᠡᠨ ᠬᠠᠰ ᠤᠨ ᠵᠠᠮ ᠲᠠᠢ ᠢᠨᠲ᠋ᠧᠷᠨᠠᠼᠢᠤᠨᠠᠯ

ᠭᠡᠮ ᠦᠭᠡᠢ ᠰᠠᠭᠤᠭᠰᠠᠨ ᠣᠷᠴᠢᠯᠠᠩ ᠢ ᠭᠡᠮᠲᠦᠭᠦᠯᠦᠨ ᠳᠠᠷᠤᠯᠠᠭᠴᠢ ᠺᠠᠫᠢᠲ᠋ᠠᠯᠲᠠᠨ ᠢ ᠬᠡᠶᠢᠰᠬᠡᠨ ᠠᠷᠢᠯᠭᠠᠬᠤ ᠪᠠᠷ ᠡᠰᠡᠷᠭᠦᠴᠡᠭᠰᠡᠨ ᠭᠡᠭᠡᠨ ᠮᠥᠷ ᠲᠡᠢ ᠢᠨᠲ᠋ᠧᠷᠨᠠᠼᠢᠤᠨᠠᠯ

ᠭᠠᠶᠢᠬᠠᠮᠰᠢᠭᠲᠤ ᠵᠢᠪᠬᠤᠯᠠᠩᠲᠤ ᠤᠯᠠᠭᠠᠨ ᠲᠤᠭ ᠢᠶᠠᠷ ᠭᠠᠵᠠᠷ ᠤᠨ ᠪᠥᠮᠪᠥᠷᠴᠡᠭ ᠢ ᠪᠥᠷᠬᠥᠭᠡᠳ ᠭᠠᠯ ᠤᠰᠤᠨ ᠤ ᠭᠠᠰᠢᠭᠤᠨ ᠵᠣᠪᠠᠯᠠᠩ ᠠᠴᠠ ᠭᠡᠲᠦᠯᠭᠡᠭᠴᠢ ᠭᠠᠶᠢᠬᠠᠮᠰᠢᠭᠲᠤ ᠭᠤᠷᠪᠠᠳᠤᠭᠠᠷ ᠢᠨᠲ᠋ᠧᠷᠨᠠᠼᠢᠤᠨᠠᠯ

ᠳᠣᠷᠣᠨ᠎ᠠ ᠥᠷᠥᠨ᠎ᠡ ᠶᠢᠨ ᠣᠯᠠᠨ ᠲᠢᠪ ᠳ᠋ᠡᠬᠢ ᠳᠣᠷᠣᠮᠵᠢᠯᠠᠭᠳᠠᠭᠰᠠᠨ ᠳᠠᠷᠤᠯᠠᠭᠳᠠᠭᠰᠠᠨ ᠠᠷᠠᠳ ᠲᠦᠮᠡᠨ ᠳᠠᠷᠤᠶᠢᠬᠠᠨ ᠪᠥᠭᠥᠳᠡᠭᠡᠷ ᠢᠶᠡᠨ ᠪ ᠠᠴᠠᠵᠠᠭᠠᠵᠤ ᠳᠣᠭᠰᠢᠨ ᠬᠠᠷᠭᠢᠰ ᠤᠳ ᠢ ᠳᠤᠷᠴᠠᠭᠲᠤᠨ

ᠪᠠᠶᠠᠯᠢᠭ ᠨᠣᠶᠠᠳ ᠤᠳ ᠤᠨ ᠡᠷᠬᠡ ᠮᠡᠳᠡᠯ ᠳᠦ ᠪᠠᠯᠪᠠᠭᠠᠳᠠᠨ ᠳᠠᠷᠤᠯᠠᠭᠳᠠᠭᠰᠠᠨ ᠠᠷᠠᠳ ᠲᠦᠮᠡᠨ ᠪᠠᠭ᠎ᠠ ᠶᠢᠨ ᠬᠠᠶᠢᠷᠠᠨ ᠨᠠᠰᠤᠨ ᠠᠴᠠ ᠪᠠᠨ ᠦᠢᠯᠡᠳᠪᠦᠷᠢ ᠳᠦ ᠵᠢᠳᠬᠦᠭᠰᠡᠨ ᠠᠷᠠᠳ ᠲᠦᠮᠡᠨ

ᠡᠳᠡᠭᠡᠷ ᠣᠯᠠᠨ ᠵᠣᠪᠠᠯᠠᠩᠲᠠᠨ ᠨᠠᠷ ᠡᠪ ᠬᠠᠮᠲᠤ ᠶᠢᠨ ᠢᠨᠲ᠋ᠧᠷᠨᠠᠼᠢᠤᠨᠠᠯ ᠳᠤ ᠨᠢᠭᠡᠳᠴᠦ ᠡᠷᠴᠢᠮᠲᠡᠢ ᠠᠩᠬᠢ ᠶᠢᠨ ᠴᠢᠨᠠᠷ ᠢ ᠪᠠᠷᠢᠮᠲᠠᠯᠠᠨ ᠡᠵᠡᠷᠬᠡᠭ ᠪᠠᠶᠠᠴᠤᠳ ᠢ ᠡᠰᠡᠷᠭᠦᠴᠡᠶ᠎ᠡ

ᠵᠢᠷᠭᠠᠯᠠᠩᠲᠤ ᠪᠠᠶᠢᠳᠠᠯ ᠢ ᠵᠣᠬᠢᠶᠠᠨ ᠴᠢᠳᠠᠭᠴᠢ ᠵᠢᠪᠬᠤᠯᠠᠩᠲᠤ ᠲᠤᠭ ᠶᠠᠭᠤ ᠶᠢ ᠪᠠᠨ ᠪᠠᠶᠢᠭᠤᠯᠤᠭᠰᠠᠨ ᠵᠢᠷᠤᠮᠲᠤ ᠡᠪ ᠬᠠᠮᠲᠤ ᠨᠠᠮ ᠤᠳ ᠤᠨ ᠵᠢᠷᠤᠮ ᠬᠣᠯᠪᠣᠭ᠎ᠠ ᠳᠤ ᠢᠨᠲ᠋ᠧᠷᠨᠠᠼᠢᠤᠨᠠᠯ

ᠭᠡᠭᠡᠨ ᠲᠤᠩᠭᠠᠯᠠᠭ ᠡᠷᠳᠡᠮ ᠰᠤᠶᠤᠯ ᠢᠶᠠᠷ ᠳᠥᠷᠪᠡᠨ ᠵᠦᠭ ᠲᠦ ᠪᠡᠨ ᠴᠡᠴᠡᠭ ᠳᠡᠯᠭᠡᠵᠦ ᠭᠡᠷᠡᠯᠲᠦ ᠨᠠᠷᠠᠨ ᠤ ᠡᠷᠳᠡᠨᠢ ᠶᠢᠨ ᠲᠤᠶᠠᠭ᠎ᠠ ᠪᠠᠷ ᠶᠢᠷᠲᠢᠨᠴᠦ ᠳᠠᠬᠢᠨ ᠢ ᠭᠡᠶᠢᠭᠦᠯᠬᠦ ᠪᠣᠯᠲᠤᠭᠠᠢ

ᠡᠨᠡᠬᠦ ᠳᠡᠯᠡᠬᠡᠢ ᠶᠢᠨ ᠠᠷᠠᠳ ᠲᠦᠮᠡᠨ ᠢ ᠡᠷᠬᠡᠪᠰᠢ ᠨᠢᠭᠡᠳᠬᠡᠬᠦ ᠵᠣᠷᠢᠯᠭ᠎ᠠ ᠲᠠᠢ ᠡᠪ ᠬᠠᠮᠲᠤ ᠶᠢᠨ ᠭᠤᠷᠪᠠᠳᠤᠭᠠᠷ ᠢᠨᠲ᠋ᠧᠷᠨᠠᠼᠢᠤᠨᠠᠯ ᠡᠭᠦᠷᠢᠳᠡ ᠨᠠᠷᠠᠨ ᠮᠡᠲᠦ ᠮᠠᠨᠳᠤᠬᠤ ᠪᠣᠯᠲᠤᠭᠠᠢ

== See also ==
- National anthem of Mongolia
- Tuvan Internationale
