= Eregzengiin Choidog =

Mongolian composer

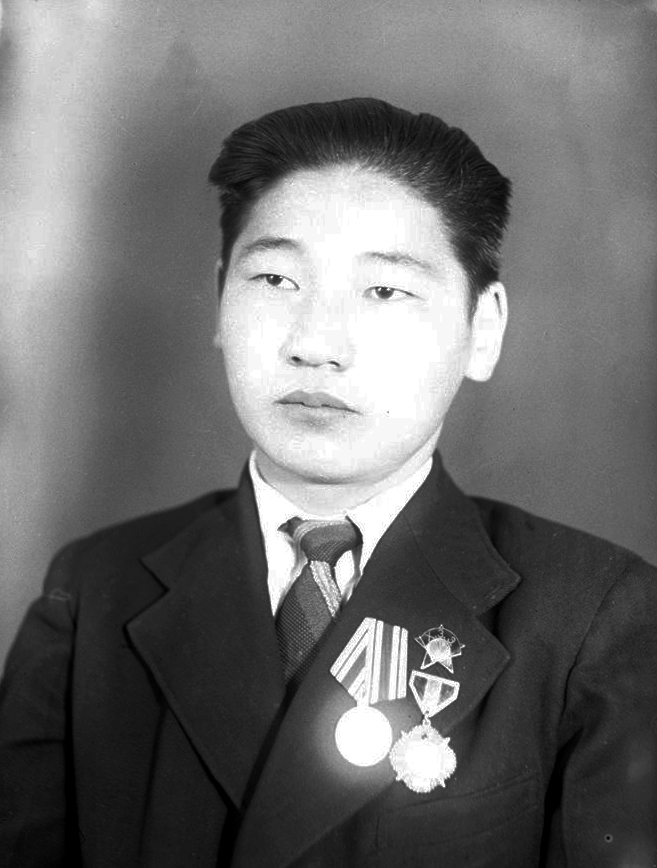
Eregzengiin Choidog

Eregzengiin Choidog (Mongolian: Эрэгзэнгийн Чойдог; 1926–1988) is one of Mongolia's best known composers.

He was cited as belonging to “the nineteenth century European school of composers" who along with the other Mongolian composers Sembiin Gonchigsumlaa and Luvsanjambyn Mördorj drew inspiration from composers such as Tchaikovsky and Mahler. He is perhaps best known for his overture Friendship composed in 1962 for USSR Radio and TV symphony orchestra, conducted by Yevgeny Akulov, and his The Tale of Lady Choijid or The Choijid Tara, a Mongolian ballet based upon the Buddhist story of the young girl Choijid which is now considered one of the classics and staples of state opera theatre in Mongolia. He was also noted for his A Flower Among Sage Bushe in the 1950s.
