= Mongolian Military Song and Dance Academic Ensemble =

Mongolian military ensemble

Members of the ensemble perform a traditional dance during a Mongolian culture event as part of the Khaan Quest Exercises in 2013.

The Mongolian Military Song and Dance Academic Ensemble (Mongolian: Цэргийн Дуу Бүжгийн Эрдмийн Чуулга, Tsergiin Duu Büjgiin Erdmiin Chuulga) is an official academic ensemble of the Mongolian Armed Forces. It is located on Sükhbaatar Street in the Mongolian capital of Ulaanbaatar. It is under the direct command of the Mongolian Defense Ministry.

== History ==
A member of the band singing a traditional war song in an army uniform.

It was founded on December 12, 1932, as a small musical quorum for the army. It was the first professional fine art organization to work with the purpose of strengthening the morale of the national military. It was composed of Mongolian laborers and young people in military affairs, and nomads, all three of which presented their traditional customs, aesthetics and morals to the public as part of the ensemble. It was instrumental in the cultural support of the Mongolian People's Army led by Khorloogiin Choibalsan during the Battles of Khalkhin Gol and the Soviet invasion of Manchuria. It was transferred to the General Purpose Force of the Mongolian Armed Forces following the fall of communism in 1992.

== Notability ==
The ensemble is often considered to be the equivalent to the Alexandrov Ensemble. It commonly undertakes visits to foreign countries in the Eurasian region to conduct concerts and other performances. Among these countries are Russia, Romania, the DPRK, Turkey, France, Japan, China, Estonia, Bulgaria and Thailand. It is enough to say that the quorum choirers, dancers, and musicians have been performing a lot more times than the audience.

Many of the ensemble's artists have won many honorary, state-of-the-art awards, folk actors, and artistic merchants, including over 50 honorary actors, demonstrating the success of the group's achievements in its history. It appeared in a 1962 government film called "War of Merit" and another one in 1982 called the "Red Flag of the Red War". In 2002, on the occasion of the Platinum jubilee of the ensemble, it was awarded the honorary title of being an "Academic ensemble".

It has recently pursued a policy of cooperating with art organizations in foreign countries. These ensembles include but are not limited to: the Alexandrov Ensemble, the United States Army Chorus and the Choir of the French Army. In addition, it has also signed agreements with domestic tourism organizations such as Nomadic Expeditions. The ensemble also of course, works directly alongside other military ensembles, specifically the Band of the General Staff of the armed forces, as well as the bands and choirs of the Military Music College of Mongolia, both of which the academic ensemble is affiliated with.

== Mission ==
The ensembles mission is to improve the promotion of the Ministry of Defense's policy and objectives in increasing military service and public awareness for the armed forces. It also promotes the country's military culture in foreign relations and increase the Esprit de corps among armed forces personnel.

== Organizational Overview ==
The Song and Dance Academic Ensemble has just over 100 members, divided into the following ensembles:

- Chamber Orchestra
- Symphonic Orchestra
- Dance Group
- Choir
- Cultural Group

The following is a list of the notable repertoire of the ensemble:

- The Red Banner March (Тугийн марш)
- We Are the Defenders of Socialism (Бид Социализмыг Хамгаалагчид), used during the socialist period.
- Alkhaad March (Алхаад марш)
- Mongolian Folk Song (Монгол ардын цэргийн дуу)

== See also ==
- Mongolian Armed Forces
- Alexandrov Ensemble
- Military Band of the General Staff of the Armed Forces of Mongolia
- Military Music College of Mongolia
