= The Rejected Girl =

1929 novel by Tsendiin Damdinsüren

The Rejected Girl (Mongolian: Гологдсон хүүхэн, romanized: Gologdson Khüükhen) is a novel by Mongolian author Tsendiin Damdinsüren written in 1929. One of the more notable early Mongolian novels, it was made into a film in the 1960s.
