= Gaadangiin Altankhuyag =

Mongolian composer and musician

Gaadangiin Altankhuyag (Mongolian: Гаадангийн Алтанхуяг; born March 15. 1948) is a Mongolian composer and Morin Khuur player.

Altankhuyag was born in Ulaanbaatar and grew up in the Erdenedalai sum in Dundgovi aimag. He studied at the National Academy of Music of Bulgaria and received a teacher's education at the Academy for Music and Dance (Хөгжим Бүжгийн Дунд Сургууль, УБДС) in Ulaanbaatar. After that he taught at the Academy for Music and Dance and worked with Radio and Television as an editor in the programming committee. He composed for the Singing and Dance Ensemble of the army and worked as a teacher for the Morin Khuur ensemble of the State Philharmony.

Altankhuyags work consists of song, solo and orchestra pieces, as well as film scores.
