= Military Music College of Mongolia =

Military music institution of Mongolia

- Монголын цэргийн хөгжмийн коллеж
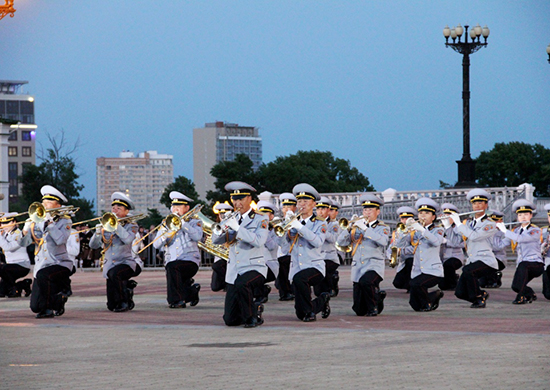
- Type: military academy
- Established: 1991
- Founders: Mongolian Armed Forces
- Academic affiliation: National Defense University
- Location: Ulaanbaatar, Mongolia
- Language: Mongolian

The Military Music College of Mongolia (Mongolian: Монголын цэргийн хөгжмийн коллеж) is a military music institution in the Mongolian National Defense University. It is designed to prepare cadets to become professional musicians for art organizations in the Armed Forces of Mongolia, such as the Mongolian Military Song and Dance Academic Ensemble. It was founded in 1991 by the Ministry of Defense following the fall of communism in Mongolia.

The school is made up of three notable educational groups:

- Military Brass Band
- Corps of Drums
- Choir

The brass band participates in national and cultural musical events, such as the Mongolian State Flag Day Parade on Sükhbaatar Square, to which it plays an important role. Graduates of the college take part in festivals of brass bands, which are commonly held in South Korea, Germany, Great Britain and Russia. The whole college acts as a military unit the size of a battalion and is included during joint performances with other Mongolian military bands.

== Overview ==
It descends from a trumpet class founded in 1924 at the People's Military Command School. The college began as a fine arts course when it began in October 1991. When it started, many Mongolian and foreign musicians were brought in to help manage the college. In 1992, one year after the establishment of the course, it was converted into a Music Department and later was given its current name, with its structure being expanded as a result. Since 1991, the college has taken part in the Mongolian State Flag Day military parade on Sükhbaatar Square as part of the corps of drums and the massed bands. All cadets at the college graduate with a bachelor's degree in musical arts, which can aide students who chose to specialize as conductors of unit bands.
