= National anthem of Mongolia =

Mongol Ulsiin Töriin duulal
English: National anthem of Mongolia
- Монгол Улсын Төрийн дуулал
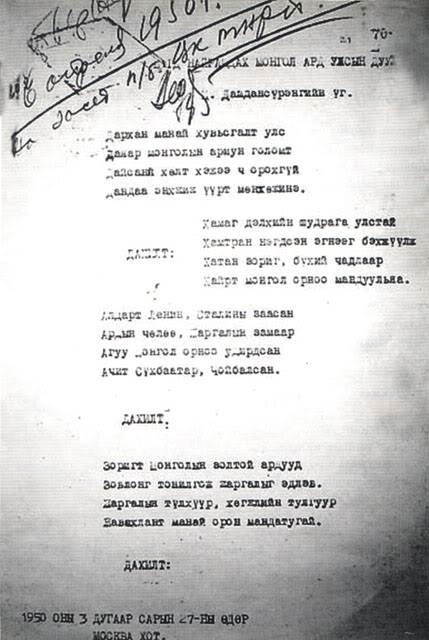
- The original lyrics in a 1950 decree
- National anthem of Mongolia
- Also known as: БНМАУ-ын сүлд дуулал (English: State Anthem of the Mongolian People's Republic)
- Lyrics: Tsendiin Damdinsüren
- Music: Bilegiin Damdinsüren and Luvsanjambyn Mördorj
- Adopted: 1950; 76 years ago

Audio sample
- file; help

The national anthem of Mongolia, (Note: Mongolian: Монгол Улсын Төрийн дуулал, romanized: Mongol Ulsiin töriin duulal, pronounced [mɔ́ɴɢəɮ ʊɮsíːɴ tʰɵríːɴ tʊ́ːɮəɮ]) known before 1991 as the State Anthem of the Mongolian People's Republic, (Note: Mongolian: Бүгд Найрамдах Монгол Ард Улсын сүлд дуулал, romanized: Bügd Nairamdakh Mongol Ard Ulsiin süld duulal, pronounced [puxt nɛ́ːrəmtəχ mɔ́ɴɢəɮ art ʊɮsíːɴ suɮt tʊ́ːɮəɮ]) was originally created in 1950 during the communist government to replace the "Mongol Internationale". The music was composed by Bilegiin Damdinsüren and Lubhsanjambiin Mördorj, and the lyrics were written by Tsendiin Damdinsüren. The lyrics were modified several times, most recently in 2006.

== History ==
Prior to 1950, Mongolia did not have an official national anthem. However, there were certain songs that had been considered patriotic anthems of the Mongol nation—most notably the song "Ertnii saikhan" (Mongolian: Эртний сайхан [e̝r̥tʰníː sɛ́ːχəɴ]; lit. 'Ancient Beauty'), which was popular among the Mongols as a patriotic anthem, but eventually fell out of fame by the 1930s. It was included in a collection of songs by the singer Magsarjav Dugarjav in 1935, and its lyrics were preserved. In the 1970s, the lyrics of "Ertnii saikhan" were changed to suit the ideological situation of the time. When the British army invaded Tibet, the 13th Dalai Lama invaded Mongolia in 1904 and settled there until 1906, parts of the lyrics were modified. After the accession of Bogd Khan to the throne in 1911, parts of the lyrics were once again modified.

After the establishment of the Bogd Khanate of Mongolia in 1911, Bogd Khan chose the song "Zuun Langiin Joroo Luus" as the national anthem in 1915. Following the Mongolian Revolution of 1921, the song was relinquished, and in 1924, it was replaced by the "Mongol Internationale". Although the "Mongol Internationale" was never officially designated as the national anthem of Mongolia, the words and melody of the song, which are different than those of the original left-wing anthem "The Internationale", were sung with respect by a generation of Mongolians as an unofficial national anthem at the time.

According to historical records, the work of composing and selecting poems for the new national anthem began in 1945. The former Arts Department issued the “Rules for the Closed Competition for Composing the Words of the New Mongolian Anthem” and gave special provisions and guidelines for the content and form of the poems. Although the deadline for the poetry competition was set on 31 December 1945, the works continued to be submitted until April 1946. Writers and poets including Tsendiin Damdinsuren et al. participated in this poetry competition. Several compositions of the melody were completed by early 1949. Marshal Khorloogiin Choibalsan personally participated in this selection of the new anthem and listened to many versions of the melody and song. The combined melodies composed by Bilegiin Damdinsüren and Luvsanjambyn Mördorj were ultimately chosen.

Since the early 20th century, Mongolia has had two national anthems: the first, used between 1924 and 1950, was called the "Mongol Internationale", with lyrics by Sonombaljiriin Buyannemekh and music by Magsarjaviin Dugarjav. It is often incorrectly listed as the Mongolian-language version of "The Internationale", despite the two songs having almost nothing in common aside from similar titles. "The Internationale" does have a Mongolian version, however, which should not be confused with the "Mongol Internationale".

The second anthem, by Damdinsüren and Mördorj, replaced the "Mongol Internationale" and has been in use since 1950. In accordance with the 1960 constitution, the words of the anthem were changed in 1961 by Tsevegmidin Gaitav and Choijilin Chimed. The lyrics were changed slightly in 1961 to include references to the Mongolian People's Revolutionary Party and remove references to various Soviet and Mongolian leaders; however, the original lyrics were restored in early 1991, a year prior to the end of the communist regime. Since 1991, most of the lyrics from 1950 have been in use again, but the second verse (praising Lenin, Stalin, Sükhbaatar and Choibalsan) has been removed. On 6 July 2006, the lyrics were revised by the Mongolian Parliament to commemorate Genghis Khan.

The current Constitution of Mongolia mandates that the national anthem be broadcast daily on media channels prior to the end of transmissions.

== Lyrics ==
=== Current official version ===
Mongolian original

Cyrillic script

Дархан манай тусгаар улс
Даяар монголын ариун голомт
Далай их дээдсийн гэгээн үйлс
Дандаа энхжиж, (Note: Sometimes written энхжин, with the modal converb suffix -н instead of the imperfective converb suffix -ж.) үүрд мөнхжинө.

Хамаг дэлхийн шударга улстай
Хамтран нэгдсэн эвээ бэхжүүлж
Хатан зориг, бүхий л чадлаараа
Хайртай Монгол орноо мандуулъя.

Өндөр төрийн минь сүлд ивээж
Өргөн түмний минь заяа түшиж
Үндэс язгуур, хэл соёлоо
Үрийн үрдээ өвлөн бадраая.

Эрэлхэг Монголын золтой ардууд
Эрх чөлөө жаргалыг эдлэв
Жаргалын түлхүүр, хөгжлийн тулгуур
Жавхлант манай орон мандтугай.

Latin script

Darkhan manai tusgaar uls
Dayaar mongoliin ariun golomt
Dalai ikh deedsiin gegeen üils
Dandaa enkhjij, üürd mönkhjinö.

Khamag delkhiin shudarga ulstai
Khamtran negdsen ebhee bekhjüülj
Khatan zorig, bükhii-l chadlaaraa
Khairtai Mongol ornoo manduulya.

Öndör töriin mini süld ibheej
Örgön tümnii mini zayaa tüshij
Ündes yazguur, khel soyoloo
Üriin ürdee öbhlön badraaya.

Erelkheg Mongoliin zoltoi arduud
Erkh chölöö jargaliig edlebh
Jargaliin tülkhüür, khögjliin tulguur
Jabhkhlant manai oron mandtugai.

IPA transcription (Note: See Help:IPA/Mongolian and Mongolian phonology.)

[tár.χəɴ ma.nɛ́ tʰʊs.ʁár ʊ́.ɮəs |]
[ta.jár mɔɴ.ɢə.ɮʲíɴ ɛ́.rʲʊɴ qɔ́.ɮəmtʰ ‖]
[ta.ɮɛ́‿ix téːt.sʲiɴ ke.ɣéɴ úɪ.ɮəs |]
[tan.tá éŋx.tɕʲɪtɕ | úː.rət mɵ́ŋx.tɕʲɪ.nə ‖]

[χá.məq teɮ.xʲíɴ ɕʊ́.t(ə).rəq ʊ.ɮ(ə)s.tʰɛ́ |]
[χámtʰ.rəɴ néxt.səɴ e.wé pex.tɕúɮ.tɕə ‖]
[χá.tʰəɴ tsœ́.rʲɪk | pu.xʲí‿ɮ tɕʰat.ɮá.ra |]
[χɛ́ːr.tʰɛ mɔ́ɴ.ɢəɮ ɔr.nɔ́ man.tʊ́ɮʲ.jə ‖]

[ɵ́n.tər tʰɵ.rʲíɴ mʲinʲ suɮt i.wétɕ |]
[ɵ́r.kəɴ tʰum.nʲí mʲinʲ tsa.já tʰú.ɕʲɪtɕ ‖]
[ún.təs jats.ʁʊ́r xeɮ sɔ.jə.ɮɔ́ |]
[u.rʲiɴ ur.té ɵ́w.ɮəɴ pat.rá.jə ‖]

[é.r(ə)ɮ.xək mɔɴ.ɢ(ə).ɮʲíɴ tsɔɮ.tʰœ́ɪ ar.tʊ́t |]
[erx tɕʰɵ.ɮɵ́ tɕar.ʁə.ɮʲik é.tə.ɮəw ‖]
[tɕar.ʁ(ə).ɮʲíɴ tʰuɮ.xúr xɵ́x.tɕ(ʲɪ).ɮʲíɴ tʰʊɮ.ʁʊ́r |]
[tɕáwχ.ɮəntʰ ma.nɛ́ ɔ́.rəɴ mant.tʰʊ.ʁɛ́ ‖]

English translation

Our sacred independent country
Is the ancestral hearth of all Mongols,
May all of the world's good deeds
Prosper and continue for eternity.

Our country will strengthen relations
With all righteous countries of the world.
With all our will and might
Let us celebrate our beloved Mongolia!

Our great nation's symbol blesses us
And the people's fate supports us
Let us pass on our ancestry, culture and language
From generation to generation.

The brilliant people of the brave Mongolia
Have gained freedom and happiness.
The key to delight and the path to success,
Long live our glorious country.

In the Classical script:

ᠳᠠᠷᠬᠠᠨ ᠮᠠᠨᠠᠶ ᠲᠤᠰᠠᠭᠠᠷ ᠤᠯᠥᠰ
ᠳᠠᠶᠠᠭᠠᠷ ᠮᠤᠩᠭᠣᠯ ᠤᠨ ᠠᠷᠢᠭᠤᠨ ᠭᠤᠯᠤᠮᠲᠠ
ᠳᠠᠯᠠᠢ ᠶᠡᠬᠡ ᠳᠡᠭᠡᠳᠦᠰ ᠤᠨ ᠭᠡᠭᠡᠨ ᠦᠢᠯᠡᠰ
ᠳᠠᠩᠳᠠ ᠡ᠊ᠩᠬᠡᠵᠢᠵᠦ᠂ ᠡᠭᠦᠷᠢᠳᠡ ᠮᠦᠩᠬᠡᠵᠢᠨ᠎ᠠ᠃

ᠬᠠᠮᠤᠭ ᠳᠡᠯᠡᠭᠡᠢ ᠢᠨ ᠰᠢᠳᠤᠷᠭᠤ ᠤᠯᠤᠰ ᠲᠠᠢ
ᠬᠠᠮᠲᠤᠷᠠᠨ ᠨᠢᠭᠡᠳᠦᠭᠰᠡᠨ ᠡᠪ ᠢᠶᠡᠨ ᠪᠡᠬᠢᠵᠢᠭᠦᠯᠵᠦ
ᠬᠠᠲᠤᠨ ᠵᠤᠷᠢᠭ ᠪᠦᠬᠦᠶᠢᠯᠠ ᠴᠢᠳᠠᠯ ᠢᠶᠠᠷ ᠢᠶᠠᠨ
ᠬᠠᠢᠢᠷᠠᠲᠠᠢ ᠮᠣᠩᠭᠤᠯ ᠤᠷᠤᠨ ᠢᠶᠠᠨ ᠮᠠᠨᠳᠤᠭᠤᠯᠤᠢ᠎ᠠ᠃

ᠦᠨᠳᠦᠷ ᠲᠦᠷᠦ ᠢᠨ ᠮᠢᠨᠢ ᠰᠦᠯᠳᠡ ᠢᠪᠡᠭᠡᠵᠦ
ᠦᠷᠭᠡᠨ ᠲᠦᠮᠡᠨ ᠦ ᠮᠢᠨᠢ ᠵᠠᠶᠠᠭ᠎ᠠ ᠲᠦᠰᠢᠵᠦ
ᠦᠨᠳᠦᠰᠦ ᠢᠵᠠᠭᠤᠷ᠂ ᠬᠡᠯᠡ᠂ ᠰᠤᠶᠤᠯ ᠢᠶᠠᠨ
ᠦᠷ᠎ᠡ ᠢᠨ ᠦᠷ᠎ᠡ ᠋ᠳ᠋ᠡᠭᠡᠨ ᠦᠪᠯᠡᠨ ᠪᠠᠳᠠᠷᠠᠭᠠᠶ᠎ᠠ᠃

ᠡᠷᠡᠯᠬᠡᠭ᠌ ᠮᠣᠩᠭᠤᠯ ᠤᠨ ᠵᠤᠯ ᠲᠠᠢ ᠠᠷᠠᠳ ᠦᠳ
ᠡᠷᠬᠡ ᠴᠢᠯᠦᠭᠡ ᠵᠢᠷᠭᠠᠯ ᠢ ᠡᠳ᠋ᠯᠡᠪᠡ
ᠵᠢᠷᠭᠠᠯ ᠤᠨ ᠲᠦᠯᠬᠢᠭᠦᠷ᠂ ᠬᠦᠭ᠍ᠵᠢᠯ ᠦᠨ ᠲᠤᠯᠭᠠᠭᠤᠷᠢ
ᠵᠢᠪᠬᠤᠯᠠᠩᠲᠤ ᠮᠠᠨᠠᠶ ᠤᠷᠤᠨ ᠮᠠᠨᠳᠤᠲᠤᠭᠠᠢ᠅

=== 1991–2006 version ===
Mongolian original

Cyrillic script

Дархан манай хувьсгалт улс
Даяар Монголын ариун голомт
Дайсны хөлд хэзээ ч орохгүй
Дандаа энхжин үүрд мөнхжинө.

Дахилт:
Хамаг дэлхийн шударга улстай
Хамтран нэгдсэн эгнээг бэхжүүлж
Хатан зориг, бүхий л чадлаараа
Хайртай Монгол орноо мандуулъя.

Зоригт Монголын золтой ардууд
Зовлонг тонилгож, жаргалыг эдлэв
Жаргалын түлхүүр, хөгжлийн тулгуур
Жавхлант манай орон мандтугай.

Дахилт

Latin script

Darkhan manai khubhisgalt uls
Dayaar Mongoliin ariun golomt
Daisnii khöld khezee-ch orokhgüi
Dandaa enkhjin üürd mönkhjinö.

Dakhilt:
Khamag delkhiin shudarga ulstai
Khamtran negdsen egneeg bekhjüülj
Khatan zorig, bükhii-l chadlaaraa
Khairtai mongol ornoo manduulya.

Zorigt Mongoliin zoltoi arduud
Zobhlong tonilgoj, jargaliig edlebh
Jargaliin tülkhüür, khögjliin tulguur
Jabhkhlant manai oron mandtugai.

Dakhilt

English translation

Our sacred revolutionary country
Is the ancestral hearth of all Mongols.
No enemy shall defeat us,
We shall prosper forevermore.

Chorus:
With all righteous countries of the world,
Our country shall stand in solidarity.
With all our will and might
Let us celebrate our beloved Mongolia!

Brave Mongolia's courageous people
Have defeated all sufferings and gained happiness,
The key to delight and the path to success,
Long live our glorious country.

Chorus

In the Classical script:

ᠳᠠᠷᠬᠠᠨ ᠮᠠᠨᠠᠶ ᠬᠤᠪᠰᠭᠠᠯᠲ ᠤᠯᠤᠰ
ᠳᠠᠶᠠᠷ ᠮᠣᠩᠭᠣᠯ ᠤᠨ ᠠᠷᠢᠭᠤᠨ ᠭᠤᠯᠤᠮᠲᠠ
ᠳᠠᠢᠰᠨᠢ ᠺᠥᠯᠳ ᠺᠡᠽᠡᠡ ᠴ ᠣᠷᠣᠺᠭᠦᠢ
ᠳᠠᠩᠳᠠ ᠡ᠊ᠩᠬᠡᠵᠢᠵᠦ᠂ ᠡᠭᠦᠷᠢᠳᠡ ᠮᠦᠩᠬᠡᠵᠢᠨᠠ᠃

ᠳᠠᠬᠢᠯᠲᠠ
ᠬᠠᠮᠤᠭ ᠳᠡᠯᠡᠭᠡᠢ ᠢᠨ ᠰᠢᠳᠤᠷᠭᠤ ᠤᠯᠤᠰ ᠲᠠᠢ
ᠬᠠᠮᠲᠤᠷᠠᠨ ᠨᠢᠭᠡᠳᠦᠭᠰᠡᠨ ᠡᠪ ᠢᠶᠡᠨ ᠪᠡᠬᠢᠵᠢᠭᠦᠯᠵᠦ
ᠬᠠᠲᠤᠨ ᠵᠤᠷᠢᠭ ᠪᠦᠬᠦᠶᠢᠯᠠ ᠴᠢᠳᠠᠯ ᠢᠶᠠᠷ ᠢᠶᠠᠨ
ᠬᠠᠢᠢᠷᠠᠲᠠᠢ ᠮᠣᠩᠭᠤᠯ ᠤᠷᠤᠨ ᠢᠶᠠᠨ ᠮᠠᠨᠳᠤᠭᠤᠯᠤᠢᠠ᠃

ᠵᠣᠷᠭᠳ ᠮᠣᠩᠭᠣᠯ ᠤᠨ ᠽᠣᠯᠳᠣᠢ ᠠᠷᠳᠤᠳ
ᠵᠣᠪᠯᠣᠩᠭ ᠳᠣᠨᠢᠯᠭᠭᠣᠵ ᠵᠠᠷᠭᠠᠯᠢᠭ ᠡᠳ᠋ᠯᠡᠪᠡ
ᠵᠠᠷᠭᠠᠢᠨ ᠳᠦᠯᠬᠦᠦᠷ ᠬᠥᠭᠵᠯᠢᠢᠨ ᠳᠤᠯᠭᠤᠤᠷ
ᠵᠢᠪᠬᠤᠯᠠᠩᠲᠤ ᠮᠠᠨᠠᠶ ᠤᠷᠤᠨ ᠮᠠᠨᠳᠤᠲᠤᠭᠠᠢ᠃

ᠳᠠᠬᠢᠯᠲᠠ

=== 1961–1991 version ===
Mongolian original

Cyrillic script

Урьдийн бэрх дарлалыг устгаж
Ардын эрх жаргалыг тогтоож
Бүх нийтийн зоригийг илтгэсэн
Бүгд Найрамдах Улсаа байгуулсан.

Дахилт:
Сайхан Монголын цэлгэр орон
Саруул хөгжлийн дэлгэр гүрэн
Үеийн үед энхжин бадартугай
Үүрдийн үүрд батжин мандтугай.

Ачит нам алсыг гийгүүлж
Хүчит түмэн улсыг хөгжүүлж
Бууршгүй зүтгэл дүүрэн хөвчилсөн
Цуцашгүй тэмцэл түүхийг товчилсон.

Дахилт

Зөвлөлт оронтой заяа холбож
Дэвшилт олонтой санаа нийлж
Хандах зүгийг бахтай барьсан
Мандах коммунизмыг цогтой зорьсон.

Дахилт

Latin script

Uridiin berkh darlaliig ustgaj
Ardiin erkh jargaliig togtooj
Bükh niitiin zorigiig iltgesen
Bügd Nairamdakh Ulsaa baiguulsan.

Dakhilt:
Saikhan Mongoliin celger oron
Saruul khögjliin delger güren
Üyeiin üyed enkhjin badartugai
Üürdiin üürd batjin mandtugai.

Achit nam alsiig giigüülj
Khüchit tümen ulsiig khögjüülj
Buurshgüi zütgel düüren khöbhchilsön
Cucashgüi temcel tüükhiig tobhchilson.

Dakhilt

Zöbhlölt orontoi zayaa kholboj
Debhshilt olontoi sanaa niilj
Khandakh zügiig bakhtai barisan
Mandakh kommunizmiig cogtoi zorison.

Dakhilt

English translation

The struggle and oppression of the past is gone,
The peoples' rights and happiness have come.
For by the faith and courage of all,
The People's Republic now stands.

Chorus:
Beautiful Mongolia, a majestic country,
A just, prosperous and vast nation.
May it forever cherish and prosper,
May it forever be strong and wealthy.

The light of the Party shines in the distance,
Building us up into a strong nation.
Entrusted with unwavering diligence,
Selflessly we will carry on the historic battle.

Chorus

Together with the Soviet Union our bold faith
The fruits of a progressive people beareth.
We are firm to carry on with loyalty
Onto glorious communism's way bravely.

Chorus

In the Classical script:

ᠤᠷᠢᠳᠤ᠎ᠶ᠋ᠢᠨ ᠪᠡᠷᠬᠡ ᠳᠠᠷᠤᠯᠠᠯ᠎ᠢ᠋ ᠤᠰᠠᠳᠬᠠᠵᠤ
ᠠᠷᠠᠳ᠎ᠤ᠋ᠨ ᠡᠷᠬᠡ ᠵᠢᠷᠭᠠᠯ᠎ᠢ᠋ ᠲᠣᠭᠲᠠᠭᠠᠵᠤ
ᠪᠦᠬᠦ ᠨᠡᠢᠲᠡ᠎ᠶ᠋ᠢᠨ ᠵᠣᠷᠢᠭ᠎ᠢ᠋ ᠢᠯᠡᠳᠬᠡᠭᠰᠡᠨ
ᠪᠦᠭᠦᠳᠡ ᠨᠠᠢᠷᠠᠮᠳᠠᠬᠤ ᠤᠯᠤᠰ᠎ᠢ᠋ᠶ᠋ᠠᠨ ᠪᠠᠢᠭᠤᠯᠤᠭᠰᠠᠨ᠃

ᠳᠠᠬᠢᠯᠲᠠ
ᠰᠠᠢᠬᠠᠨ ᠮᠣᠩᠭᠣᠯ᠎ᠤ᠋ᠨ ᠴᠡᠯᠡᠭᠡᠷ ᠣᠷᠣᠨ
ᠰᠠᠷᠠᠭᠤᠯ ᠬᠥᠭᠵᠢᠯ᠎ᠦ᠋ᠨ ᠳᠡᠯᠭᠡᠷ ᠭᠦᠷᠦᠨ
ᠦᠶ᠎ᠡ᠎ᠶ᠋ᠢᠨ ᠦᠶ᠎ᠡ᠎ᠳ᠋ᠦ᠍ ᠡᠩᠬᠡᠵᠢᠨ ᠪᠠᠳᠠᠷᠠᠲᠤᠭᠠᠢ
ᠡᠭᠦᠷᠢᠳᠡ᠎ᠶ᠋ᠢᠨ ᠡᠭᠦᠷᠢᠳᠡ ᠪᠠᠲᠤᠵᠢᠨ ᠮᠠᠨᠳᠤᠲᠤᠭᠠᠢ᠃

ᠠᠴᠢᠲᠤ ᠨᠠᠮ ᠠᠯᠤᠰ᠎ᠢ᠋ ᠭᠡᠢᠭᠦᠯᠵᠦ
ᠬᠦᠴᠦᠲᠦ ᠲᠦᠮᠡᠨ ᠤᠯᠤᠰ᠎ᠢ᠋ ᠬᠥᠭᠵᠢᠭᠦᠯᠵᠦ
ᠪᠤᠤᠷᠠᠰᠢ ᠦᠭᠡᠢ ᠵᠢᠳᠬᠦᠯ ᠳᠦᠭᠦᠷᠡᠩ ᠬᠥᠪᠴᠢᠯᠡᠭᠰᠡᠨ
ᠴᠤᠴᠠᠰᠢ ᠦᠭᠡᠢ ᠲᠡᠮᠡᠴᠡᠯ ᠲᠡᠦᠬᠡ᠎ᠶ᠋ᠢ ᠲᠣᠪᠴᠢᠯᠠᠭᠰᠠᠨ᠃

ᠳᠠᠬᠢᠯᠲᠠ

ᠵᠥᠪᠯᠡᠯᠲᠦ ᠣᠷᠣᠨ᠎ᠲᠠᠢ ᠵᠠᠶᠠᠭ᠎ᠠ ᠬᠣᠯᠪᠣᠵᠤ
ᠲᠠᠪᠰᠢᠯᠲᠠ ᠣᠯᠠᠨ᠎ᠲᠠᠢ ᠰᠠᠨᠠᠭ᠎ᠠ ᠨᠡᠢᠯᠡᠵᠦ
ᠬᠠᠨᠳᠤᠬᠤ ᠵᠦᠭ᠎ᠢ᠋ ᠪᠠᠬᠠᠲᠠᠢ ᠪᠠᠷᠢᠭᠰᠠᠨ
ᠮᠠᠨᠳᠤᠬᠤ ᠺᠣᠮᠮᠤᠢᠨᠢᠰᠮ᠎ᠢ᠋ ᠴᠣᠭᠲᠠᠢ ᠵᠣᠷᠢᠭᠰᠠᠨ᠃

ᠳᠠᠬᠢᠯᠲᠠ

=== Original version ===
Mongolian original

Cyrillic script

Дархан манай хувьсгалт улс
Даяар Монголын ариун голомт
Дайсны хөлд хэзээ ч орохгүй
Дандаа энхжиж үүрд (Note: Sometimes үүрдэ was also sung.) мөнхжинө.

Дахилт:
Хамаг дэлхийн шударга улстай
Хамтран нэгдсэн эгнээг бэхжүүлж (Note: бэхжүүлэж was also sung.)
Хатан зориг, бүхий л чадлаараа
Хайртай Монгол орноо мандуулъя.

Алдарт Ленин Сталины заасан
Ардын чөлөө, жаргалын замаар
Агуу Монгол орноо удирдсан
Ачит Сүхбаатар, Чойбалсан.

Дахилт

Зоригт Монголын золтой ардууд
Зовлонг тонилгож, жаргалыг эдлэв
Жаргалын түлхүүр, хөгжлийн тулгуур
Жавхлант манай орон мандтугай.

Дахилт

Latin script

Darkhan manai khubhisgalt uls
Dayaar Mongoliin ariun golomt
Daisnii khöld khezee-ch orokhgüi
Dandaa enkhjij üürd mönkhjinö.

Dakhilt:
Khamag delkhiin shudarga ulstai
Khamtran negdsen egneeg bekhjüülj
Khatan zorig, bükhii-l chadlaaraa
Khairtai Mongol ornoo manduulya.

Aldart Lienin Stalinii zaasan
Ardiin chölöö, jargaliin zamaar
Aguu Mongol ornoo udirdsan
Achit Sükhbaatar, Choibalsan.

Dakhilt

Zorigt Mongoliin zoltoi arduud
Zobhlong tonilgoj, jargaliig edlebh
Jargaliin tülkhüür, khögjliin tulguur
Jabhkhlant manai oron mandtugai.

Dakhilt

English translation

Our sacred revolutionary country
Is the ancestral hearth of all Mongols.
No enemy shall defeat us,
We shall prosper for eternity.

Chorus:
With all righteous countries of the world,
Our country shall stand in solidarity.
With all our will and might
Let us celebrate our beloved Mongolia!

By way of Lenin and Stalin's teachings,
Towards the people's freedom and happiness.
Our great Mongolia is being led,
By way of Sükhbaatar and Choibalsan.

Chorus

Brave Mongolia's courageous people
Have defeated all sufferings and gained happiness,
The key to delight and the path to success,
Long live our glorious country.

Chorus

In the Classical script:

ᠳᠠᠷᠬᠠᠨ ᠮᠠᠨᠠᠶ ᠬᠤᠪᠰᠭᠠᠯᠲ ᠤᠯᠤᠰ
ᠳᠠᠶᠠᠷ ᠮᠣᠩᠭᠣᠯ ᠤᠨ ᠠᠷᠢᠭᠤᠨ ᠭᠤᠯᠤᠮᠲᠠ
ᠳᠠᠢᠰᠨᠢ ᠺᠥᠯᠳ ᠺᠡᠽᠡᠡ ᠴ ᠣᠷᠣᠺᠭᠦᠢ
ᠳᠠᠩᠳᠠ ᠡ᠊ᠩᠬᠡᠵᠢᠵᠦ᠂ ᠡᠭᠦᠷᠢᠳᠡ ᠮᠦᠩᠬᠡᠵᠢᠨᠠ᠃

ᠳᠠᠬᠢᠯᠲᠠ
ᠬᠠᠮᠤᠭ ᠳᠡᠯᠡᠭᠡᠢ ᠢᠨ ᠰᠢᠳᠤᠷᠭᠤ ᠤᠯᠤᠰ ᠲᠠᠢ
ᠬᠠᠮᠲᠤᠷᠠᠨ ᠨᠢᠭᠡᠳᠦᠭᠰᠡᠨ ᠡᠪ ᠢᠶᠡᠨ ᠪᠡᠬᠢᠵᠢᠭᠦᠯᠵᠦ
ᠬᠠᠲᠤᠨ ᠵᠤᠷᠢᠭ ᠪᠦᠬᠦᠶᠢᠯᠠ ᠴᠢᠳᠠᠯ ᠢᠶᠠᠷ ᠢᠶᠠᠨ
ᠬᠠᠢᠢᠷᠠᠲᠠᠢ ᠮᠣᠩᠭᠤᠯ ᠤᠷᠤᠨ ᠢᠶᠠᠨ ᠮᠠᠨᠳᠤᠭᠤᠯᠤᠢᠠ᠃

ᠠᠯᠳᠠᠷᠲᠤ ᠯᠧᠨᠢᠨ ᠰᠲ᠋ᠠᠯᠢᠨ᠎ᠤ᠋ ᠵᠢᠭᠠᠭᠰᠠᠨ
ᠠᠷᠠᠳ᠎ᠤ᠋ᠨ ᠴᠢᠯᠥᠭᠡ᠂ ᠵᠢᠷᠭᠠᠯ᠎ᠤ᠋ᠨ ᠵᠠᠮ᠎ᠢ᠋ᠶ᠋ᠠᠷ
ᠠᠭᠤᠤ ᠮᠣᠩᠭᠣᠯ ᠣᠷᠣᠨ᠎ᠢ᠋ᠶ᠋ᠠᠨ ᠤᠳᠤᠷᠢᠳᠤᠭᠰᠠᠨ
ᠠᠴᠢᠲᠤ ᠰᠦᠬᠡᠪᠠᠭᠠᠲᠤᠷ᠂ ᠴᠣᠢᠪᠠᠯᠰᠠᠩ᠃

ᠳᠠᠬᠢᠯᠲᠠ

ᠵᠣᠷᠭᠳ ᠮᠣᠩᠭᠣᠯ ᠤᠨ ᠽᠣᠯᠳᠣᠢ ᠠᠷᠳᠤᠳ
ᠵᠣᠪᠯᠣᠩᠭ ᠳᠣᠨᠢᠯᠭᠭᠣᠵ ᠵᠠᠷᠭᠠᠯᠢᠭ ᠡᠳ᠋ᠯᠡᠪᠡ
ᠵᠠᠷᠭᠠᠢᠨ ᠳᠦᠯᠬᠦᠦᠷ ᠬᠥᠭᠵᠯᠢᠢᠨ ᠳᠤᠯᠭᠤᠤᠷ
ᠵᠢᠪᠬᠤᠯᠠᠩᠲᠤ ᠮᠠᠨᠠᠶ ᠤᠷᠤᠨ ᠮᠠᠨᠳᠤᠲᠤᠭᠠᠢ᠃

ᠳᠠᠬᠢᠯᠲᠠ

== See also ==
- Coat of arms of Mongolia
- Flag of Mongolia
- Mongol Internationale
- State Anthem of the Republic of Buryatia
- State Anthem of the Republic of Kalmykia
