= Zuun Langiin Joroo Luus =

Mongolian folk song

Зуун лангийн жороо луус
English: The Hundred-Tael Pacing Mule
- National anthem of Mongolia
- Lyrics: unknown
- Music: Andrei Kadletz
- Adopted: 1915
- Relinquished: 1924 (aftermath of the Mongolian Revolution)
- Succeeded by: "Mongol Internationale"

Audio sample
- file; help

Chord progression of Zuun Langiin Joroo Luus

"Zuun Langiin Joroo Luus" (Mongolian: Зуун лангийн жороо луус) is a Mongolian folk song that was the national anthem of the Bogd Khanate of Mongolia. After the establishment of a Mongolian state in 1911, Bogd Khan chose this song as the national anthem in 1915 and it served in such a capacity until 1924 when it was replaced by the Mongol Internationale.

== History ==
The origin of the name comes from the idea that mule is considered as the ride of Buddhist deities, such as Palden Lhamo, and that mule is worth a hundred lang and is a special vehicle. The song was originally a religious hymn.

During the time of Bogd Khanate Mongolia, there was a folk song called "Zuun lang joroo luus" as a national anthem. At that time, when Prime Minister Tögs-Ochiryn Namnansüren went to Russia for talks on military affairs, where he saw for the first time military bands performing at ceremonies. He liked the sound of this music, which gave him cause to bring brass instruments back home with a Russian musical expert, who selected 10 people from Bogd Khan's army and taught them how to play the instruments. At the same time, the Russian exploration team arrived in Mongolia and visited the Green Palace and paid tribute to the monarch, before making a request to the Russian ambassador, to create a national anthem for the Khanate. Andrey Vyacheslavovich Kadlec, a Czech-born Russian composer and principal violinist of the Mariinsky Theatre in Saint Petersburg, was commissioned to compose a "National Anthem of Mongolia". He was given the melody of a song by the Institute of Oriental Studies of the Russian Academy of Sciences at that time, which was "Zuun Lang Joroo Mulus". Subsequently, it became the National Anthem of Bogd Khant Mongolia in 1915.

From 1914-1924, the anthem was sung in religious and state ceremonies. After that, the song Mongol Internationale composed in 1922 was played by the musicians of the State Central Theater not only at ceremonies, but also at the beginning and end of Mongolian radio broadcasts.

== Lyrics ==
Mongolian original

ᠵᠠᠭᠤᠨ ᠯᠠᠩ ᠤᠨ ᠵᠢᠷᠤᠭ᠎ᠠ ᠯᠠᠤᠰ ᠢ
ᠵᠢᠤᠵᠠᠨ ᠳᠤᠮᠳᠠ ᠪᠠᠨ ᠬᠥᠯᠭᠡᠯᠡᠪᠡ ᠡ ᠬᠥ
ᠵᠤᠤᠭ᠎ᠠ ᠠᠴᠠ ᠵᠠᠯᠠᠭᠰᠠᠨ ᠪᠣᠭᠳᠠ ᠯᠠᠮ᠎ᠠ ᠶᠢ ᠪᠠᠨ
ᠵᠣᠩᠬᠣᠪ ᠤᠨ ᠰᠢᠷᠡᠭᠡᠨ ᠳᠦ ᠵᠠᠯᠠᠪᠠ ᠠ ᠬᠥ

ᠮᠥᠩᠭᠥᠨ ᠠᠮᠠ ᠲᠠᠢ ᠪᠦᠷᠢᠶ᠎ᠡ ᠪᠢᠰᠬᠢᠭᠦᠷ ᠢ
ᠮᠥᠷᠡᠨ ᠳᠤᠮᠳᠠ ᠪᠠᠨ ᠬᠠᠩᠭᠢᠨᠠᠭᠤᠯᠪᠠ ᠠ ᠬᠥ
ᠮᠥᠩᠬᠡ ᠨᠠᠰᠤ ᠲᠠᠢ ᠪᠣᠭᠳᠠ ᠯᠠᠮ᠎ᠠ ᠶᠢ ᠪᠠᠨ
ᠮᠥᠷᠭᠥᠯ ᠦᠨ ᠢᠶᠡᠨ ᠰᠢᠷᠡᠭᠡᠨ ᠳᠦ ᠵᠠᠯᠠᠪᠠ ᠠ ᠬᠥ

ᠠᠯᠲᠠᠨ ᠠᠮᠠ ᠲᠠᠢ ᠪᠦᠷᠢᠶ᠎ᠡ ᠪᠢᠰᠬᠢᠭᠦᠷ ᠢᠶᠡᠨ
ᠠᠷᠤ ᠮᠥᠷᠦᠨ ᠳᠦ ᠪᠡᠨ ᠬᠠᠩᠭᠢᠨᠠᠭᠤᠯᠪᠠ ᠠ ᠬᠥ
ᠠᠴᠢᠯᠠᠯ ᠪᠣᠯᠤᠭᠰᠠᠨ ᠪᠣᠭᠳᠠ ᠯᠠᠮ᠎ᠠ ᠶᠢ ᠪᠠᠨ
ᠠᠪᠤᠷᠠᠯ ᠤᠨ ᠰᠢᠷᠡᠭᠡᠨ ᠳᠦ ᠵᠠᠯᠠᠪᠠ ᠠ ᠬᠥ

Cyrillization

Зуун лангийн жороо луусыг
Жуузан дундаа хөлөглөв өө хө
Зуугаас залсан Богд ламыгаа
Зонховын ширээнд залав аа хө

Мөнгөн амтай бүрээ бишгүүрийг
Мөрөн дундаа хангинуулав аа хө
Мөнх настай Богд ламыгаа
Мөргөлийнхөө ширээнд залав аа хө

Алтан амтай бүрээ бишгүүрээ
Ар мөрөндөө хангинуулав аа хө
Ачлал болсон Богд ламыгаа
Авралын ширээнд залав аа хө

Romanization

Zuun langiin joroo luusyg
Juuzan dundaa khölöglöv öö khö
Zuugaas zalsan Bogd lamygaa
Zonkhovyn shireend zalav aa khö

Möngön amtai büree bishgüüriig
Mörön dundaa khanginuulav aa khö
Mönkh nastai Bogd lamygaa
Mörgöliinkhöö shireend zalav aa khö

Altan amtai büree bishgüüree
Ar möröndöö khanginuulav aa khö
Achlal bolson Bogd lamygaa
Avralyn shireend zalav aa khö

English translation

Pacer Mule worth a hundred silver coins
He rode sitting in a carriage
I worship Bogd Lama who was invited by hundreds
At the throne of Tsongkhapa

A trumpet with a silver mouth
Was blown placed on the shoulder
I worship the eternal Bogd Lama
At the prayer throne

A trumpet with a golden mouth
Was blown placed on the shoulder
I worship the venerable Bogd Lama
At the throne of Refuge
