= Naadam =

Traditional Mongolian festival

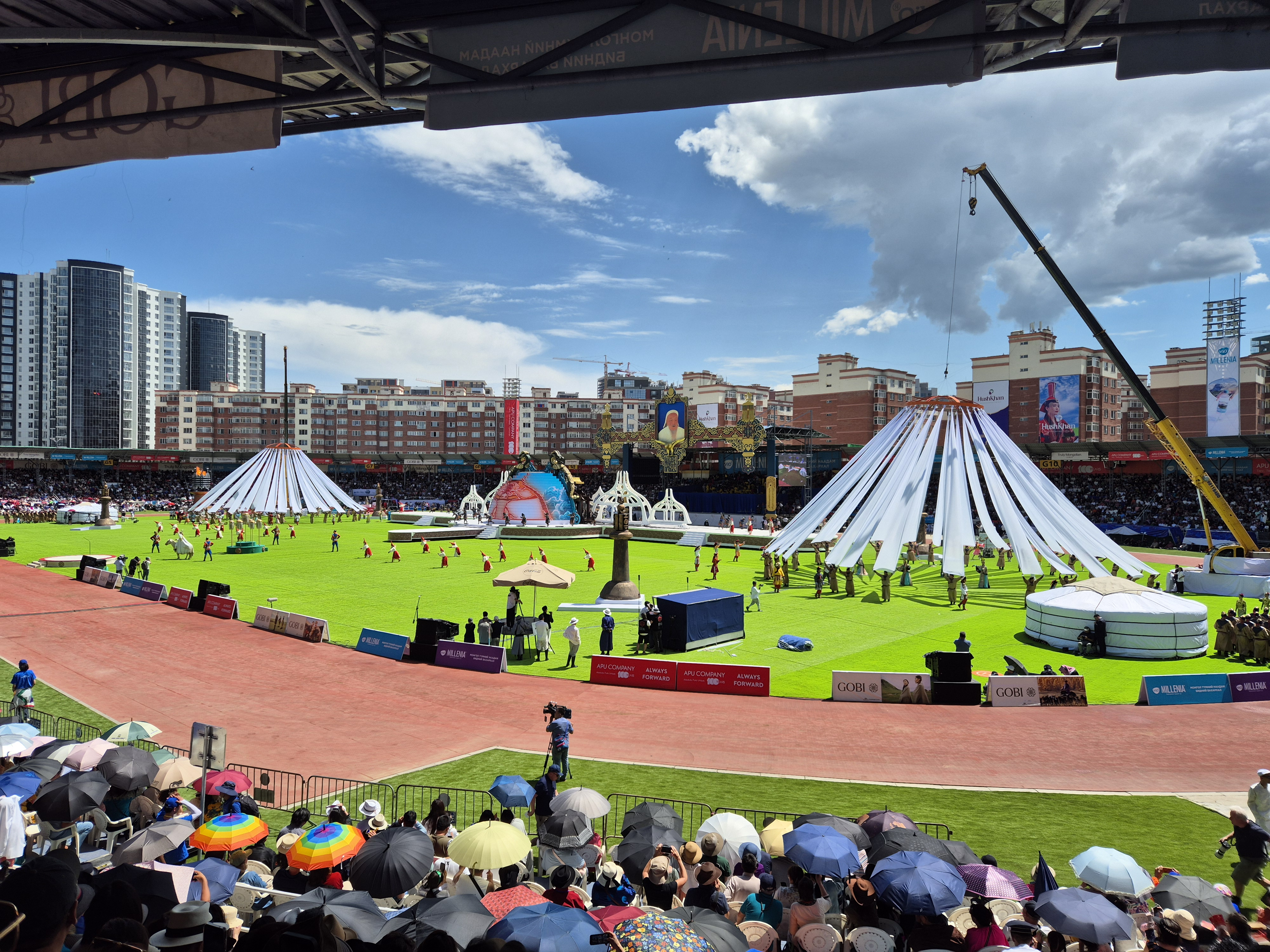
Naadam opening ceremony at the National Sports Stadium in Ulaanbaatar, 2024

Naadam (Mongolian: Наадам, Mongolian script: ᠨᠠᠭᠠᠳᠤᠮ, romanized: Naɣadum, [ˈnaːdəm], lit. 'games') is a traditional festival celebrated in Mongolia, Inner Mongolia and Tuva, involving Mongolian wrestling, horse racing and archery. The festival is also locally termed "eriin gurvan naadam" (эрийн гурван наадам, lit. 'the three games of men'), and is held during midsummer.

In 2010, Naadam was inscribed on the Representative List of the Intangible Cultural Heritage of Humanity of UNESCO.

== Overview ==
=== Origins ===
Naadam is the most widely watched festival among Mongols and is believed to have existed for centuries in one fashion or another. It has its origin in the activities, such as military parades and sporting competitions such as archery, horse riding and wrestling, that followed the celebration of various occasions, including weddings or spiritual gatherings. It later served as a way to train soldiers for battle and was also connected to Mongols' nomadic lifestyle. Mongolians practice their unwritten holiday rules that include a long song to start the holiday, then a Biyelgee dance. Traditional cuisine, or Khuushuur, is served around the Sports Stadium along with a special drink made of fermented horse milk (airag). The three standard sports of wrestling, horse racing, and archery are recorded in the 13th-century book The Secret History of the Mongols. During the Qing dynasty's rule, Naadam became a festival officially held by sums.

It began to be held annually in 1639 with a dance festival dedicated to the High Saint Zanabazar. In this festival of Shireet White Lake, Bokh Lama won in wrestling, and Bonkhor Donir's horse won the championship.

In 1772, a great festival was held to worship Khentii mountain. It is called the Festival of Ten Governments. In 1912, the Ten Government Games, which used to be played with losing points, became an annual state game. Until the death of Bogd Khan in 1925, the Ten Government Festival became a state festival. Ten Government Games have been held 125 times.

=== Communist era ===
Naadam during the period of the Mongolian People's Republic was associated with the Mongolian Revolution of 1921. The first official military parade in Communist Mongolia took place in 1921 in honor of the victories of Damdin Sükhbaatar in the revolution. It was celebrated as a Buddhist/shaman holiday until secularization in the 1930s under the Communist influence of the Soviet Union.

The anniversary parades of the Mongolian People's Army on Sükhbaatar Square were generally held on jubilee years (specifically in 1946, 1951, 1956, 1961, 1966, 1971, 1976, 1981, 1986 and 1991), alongside the International Workers' Day and October Revolution Day parades. General T. Galsan was the longtime commander these parades. During these events, party and government leaders viewed the events from the top of Sükhbaatar's Mausoleum. After 1991, the communist practice was abandoned with the exception of 1996 when a parade in the National Sports Stadium commemorated the 790th anniversary of the founding of Mongolia and the 75th anniversary of the revolution.

Many of the celebrations were celebrated with the participation of foreign communists who visited the country, including Mikhail Suslov, Józef Cyrankiewicz, and Władysław Gomułka.

=== Modern celebrations and traditions ===
The two largest Naadams held in Mongolia today are the Danshig Naadam and the National Naadam. The former was only instituted as an annual event in 2015, having previously been held irregularly and commemorates Mongolia's independence from the Qing dynasty, and also coincides with Mongolian State Flag Day. The latter formally commemorates the 1921 Revolution a decade later, when communist invaded and deposed Bogd Khan, spillover from the Russian Civil War. Naadam also celebrates the achievements of the new state.

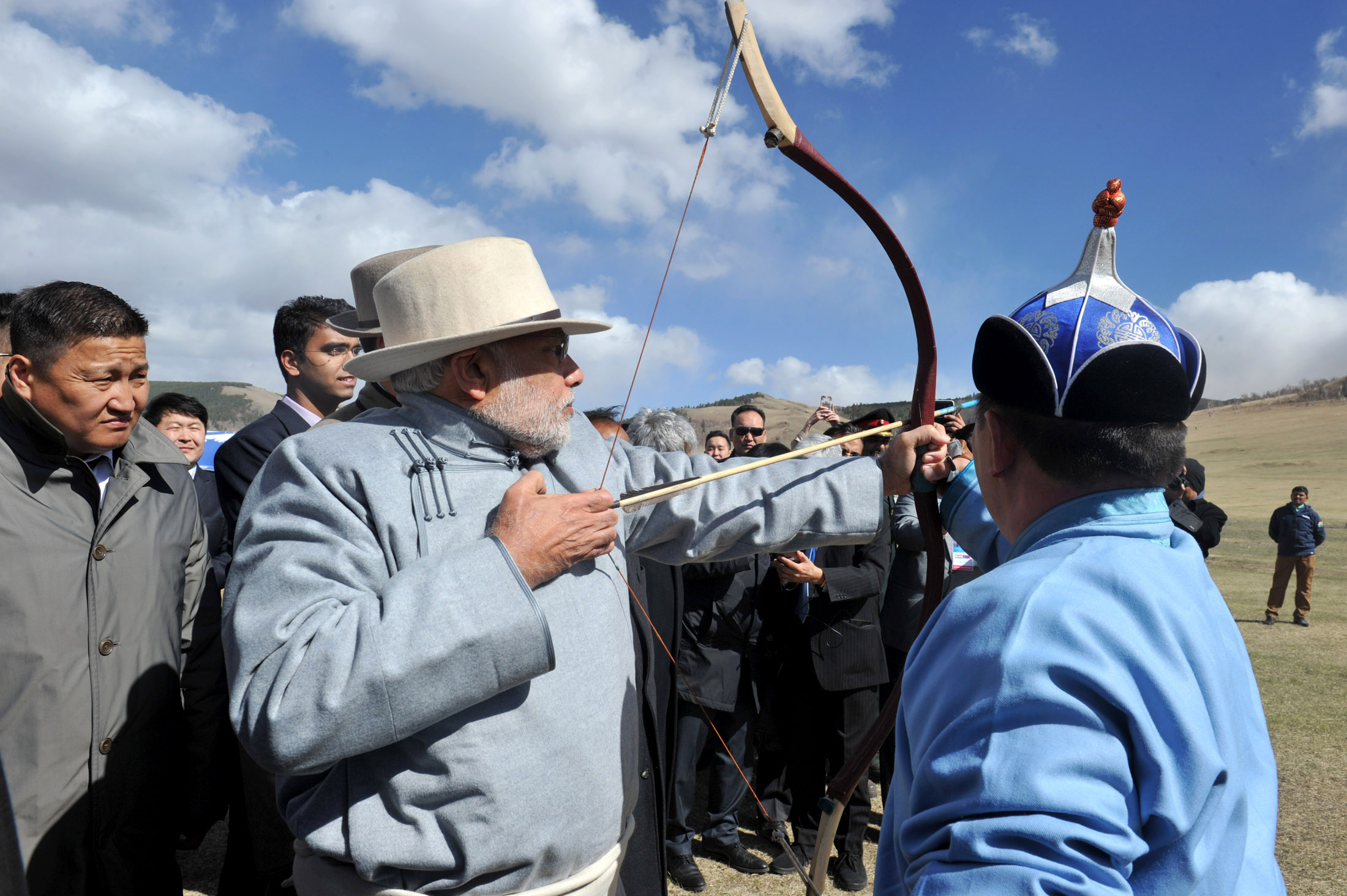
Indian Prime Minister Narendra Modi at Naadam in Ulaanbaatar

Naadam is also celebrated in different regions of Mongolia and Inner Mongolia in July and August. In the Tuva Republic, Naadam is on 15 August.

The three sports are called Danshig games. They became the great celebration of the new nation, where the nobility got together to dedicate to the Bogd Khan (Jabzundamba Khutugtu), the new head of state.

Genghis Khan's nine horse tails, representing the nine tribes of the Mongols, are still ceremonially transported from Sukhbaatar Square to the Stadium to open the Naadam festivities. At the opening and closing ceremonies, there are impressive parades of mounted cavalry, athletes and monks, alongside elements of uniformed organizations.

Another popular Naadam activity is the playing of games using shagai, which are knucklebones that serve as game pieces and tokens of both divination and friendship. In the larger Naadam festivals, tournaments may take place in a separate venue.

Recently, concerns have been raised about the perceived corruption of the festival and its ambiguous symbolism.

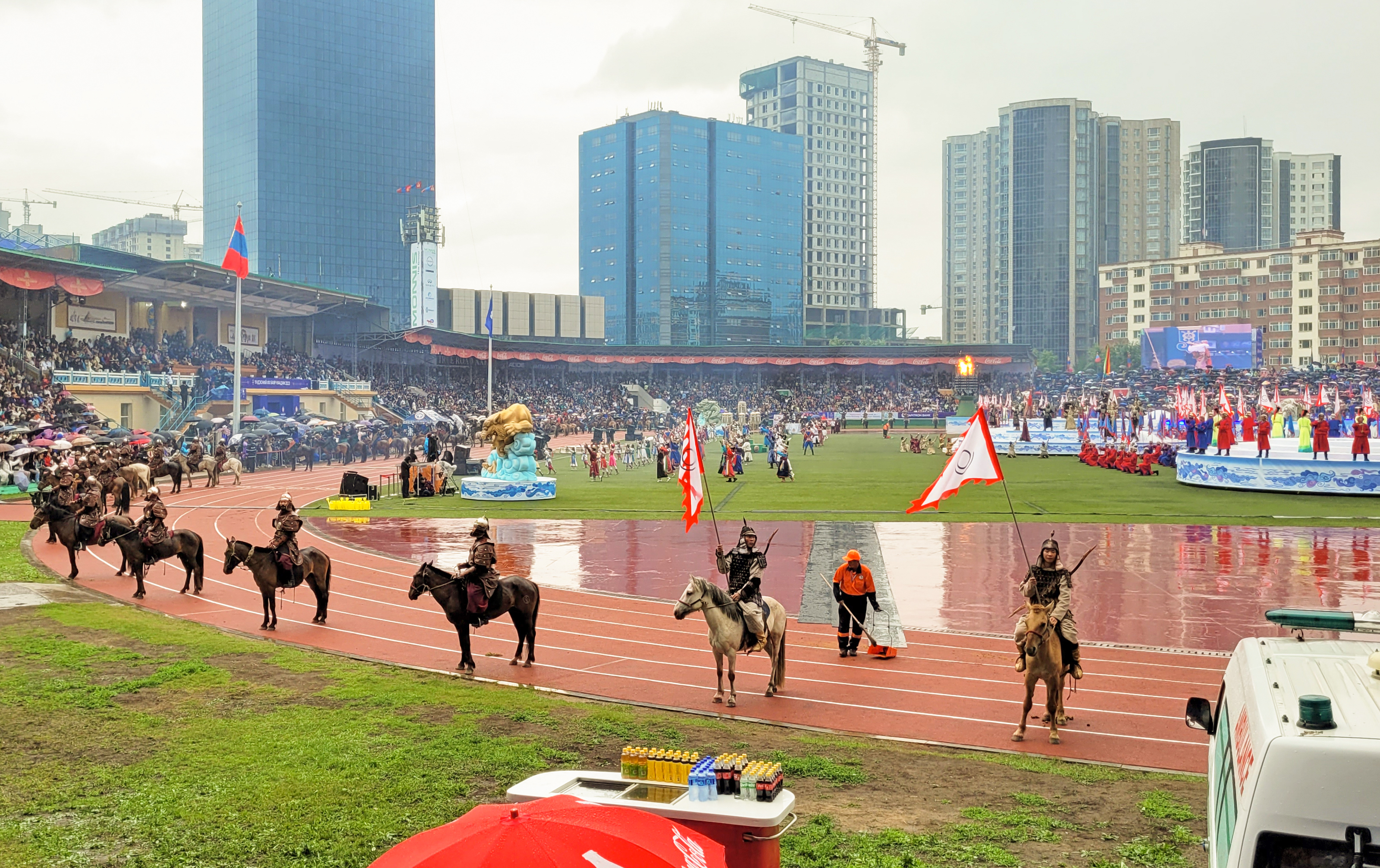
Opening ceremony of Naadam festival in Ulaanbaatar

==== National Naadam Festival ====
Alongside the Danshig Naadam, the biggest festival is the National Naadam Festival, which is held in the Mongolian capital, Ulaanbaatar, during the National Holiday from 11 to 13 July, in the National Sports Stadium. It begins with an elaborate introduction ceremony featuring dancers, athletes, horse riders, and musicians. After the ceremony, the competitions begin. The competitions are mainly horseback riding.

== Three games ==
=== Wrestling ===
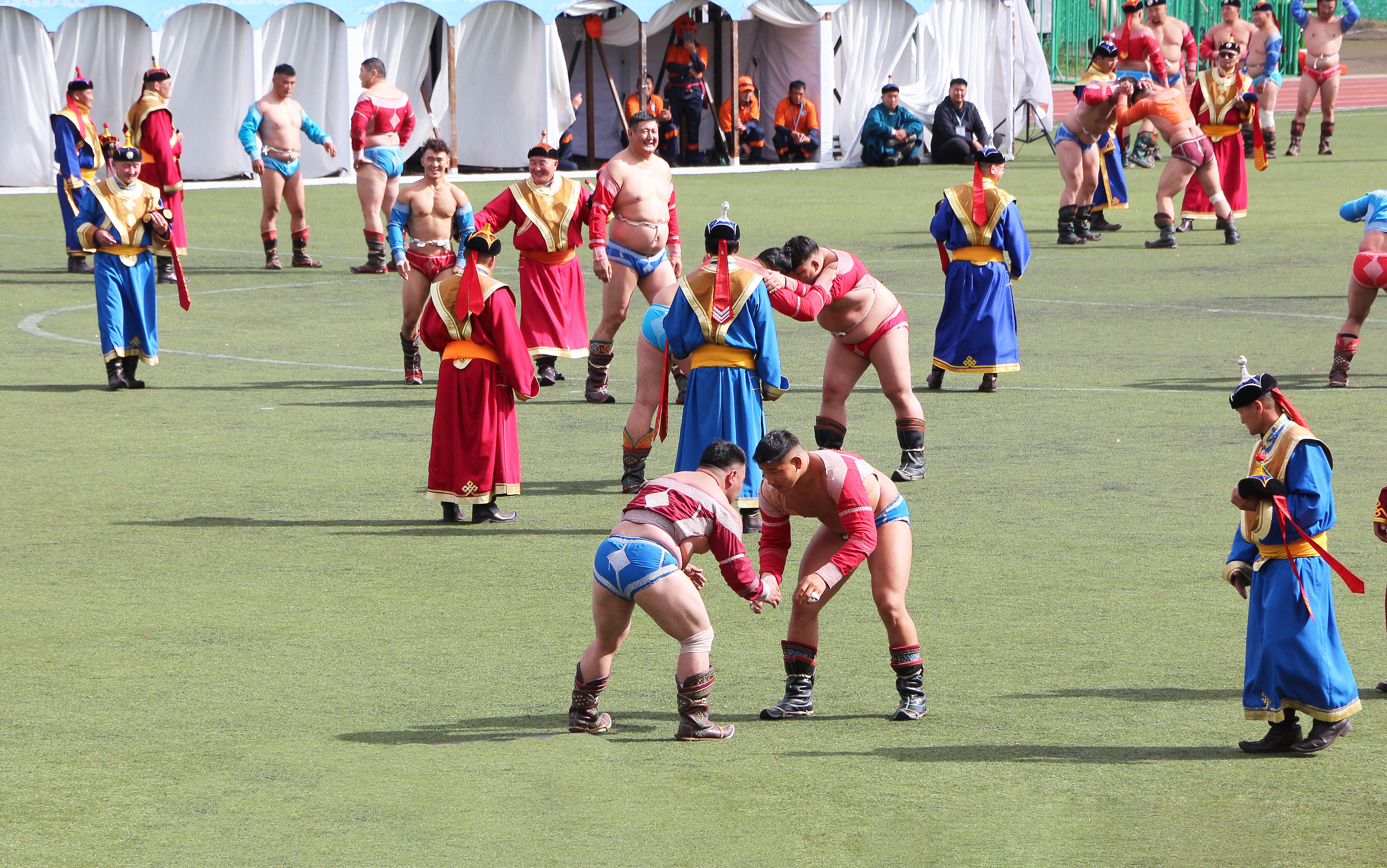
Wrestling in the 2023 Naadam festival in Ulaanbaatar

A total of 512 or 1024 wrestlers meet in a single-elimination tournament that lasts nine or ten rounds. Mongolian traditional wrestling is an untimed competition in which wrestlers lose if they touch the ground with any part of their body other than their feet or hands. When picking pairs, the wrestler with the greatest fame has the privilege to choose his opponent. Wrestlers wear two-piece costumes consisting of a tight shoulder vest (zodog) and shorts (shuudag). Only men are allowed to participate.

Winners are awarded titles for each match they complete from the fifth on: nachin after five, meaning the common kestrel; khartsaga after six, meaning hawk; zaan after seven, meaning elephant; garuda after eight; and arslan after nine, meaning lion. Winners of the tenth stage, or two-time arslans, are entitled avraga, meaning champion or giant. Each wrestler has an "encourager" called a zasuul. The zasuul sings a song of praise for the winning wrestler after rounds three, five and seven. In the final competition, the zasuuls drop in the wake of each wrestler as they step toward each other.

=== Horse racing ===
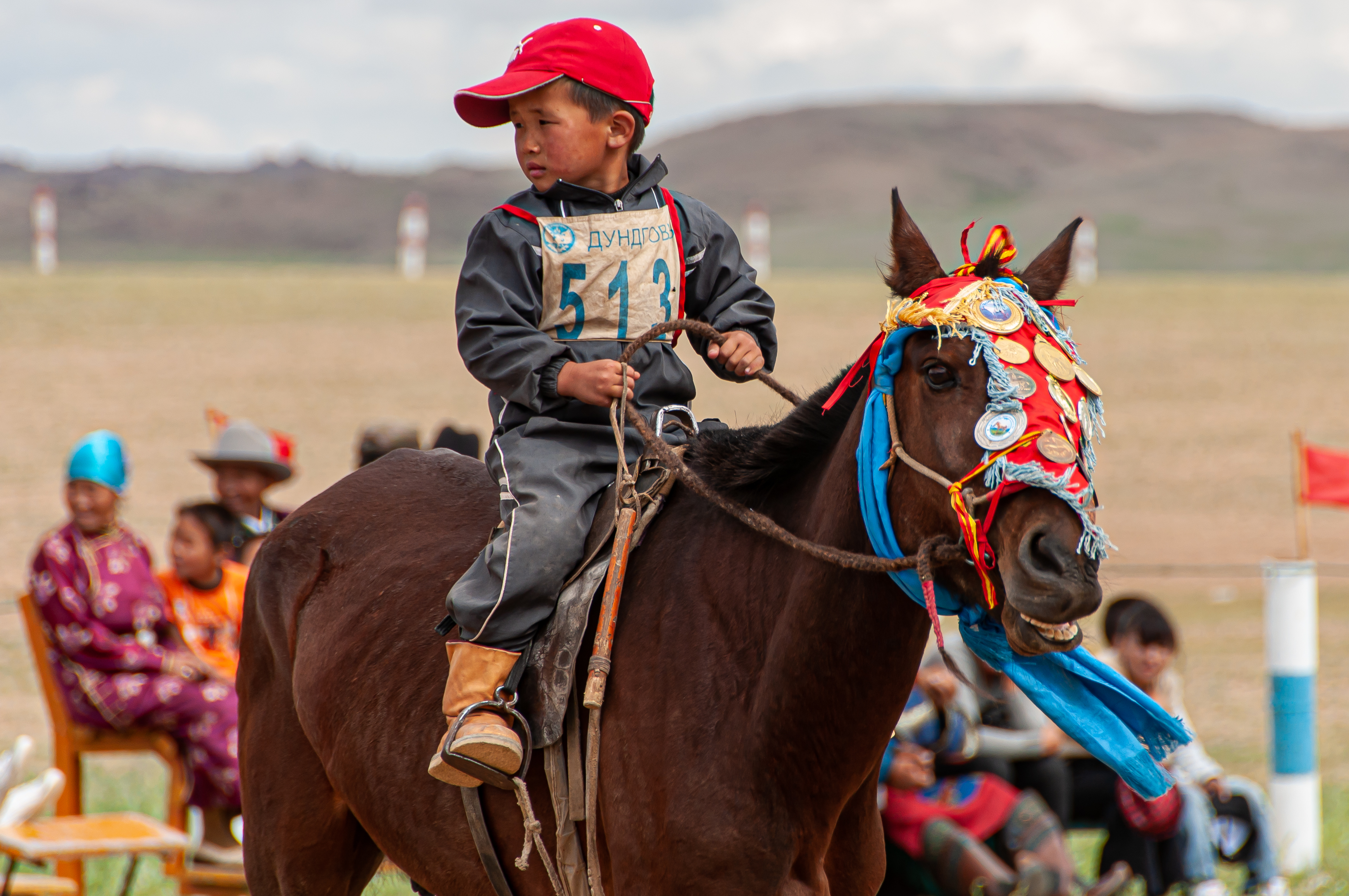
One of the young winners of a Naadam horse race in Mandalgovi, Mongolia

Unlike Western horse racing, which consists of short sprints generally not much longer than 2 km, Mongolian horse racing as featured in Naadam is a cross-country event, with races 15–30 km long. The length of each race is determined by age class. For example, two-year-old horses race for 16 km (10 mi) and seven-year-olds for 27 km (17 mi). Up to 1000 horses from any part of Mongolia can be chosen to participate. Race horses are fed a special diet.

Children from 5 to 13 are chosen as jockeys and train in the months preceding the races. While jockeys are an important component, the main purpose of the races is to test the skill of the horses.

Before the races begin, the audience sings traditional songs and the jockeys sing a song called Gingo. Prizes are awarded to horses and jockeys. The top five horses in each class earn the title of airgiyn tav and the top three are given gold, silver, and bronze medals. The winning jockey is praised with the title of tumny ekh or leader of ten thousand. The horse that finishes last in the Daaga race (two-year-old horses race) is called bayan khodood (lit. 'full stomach'). A song is sung to the bayan khodood wishing him luck to be next year's winner.

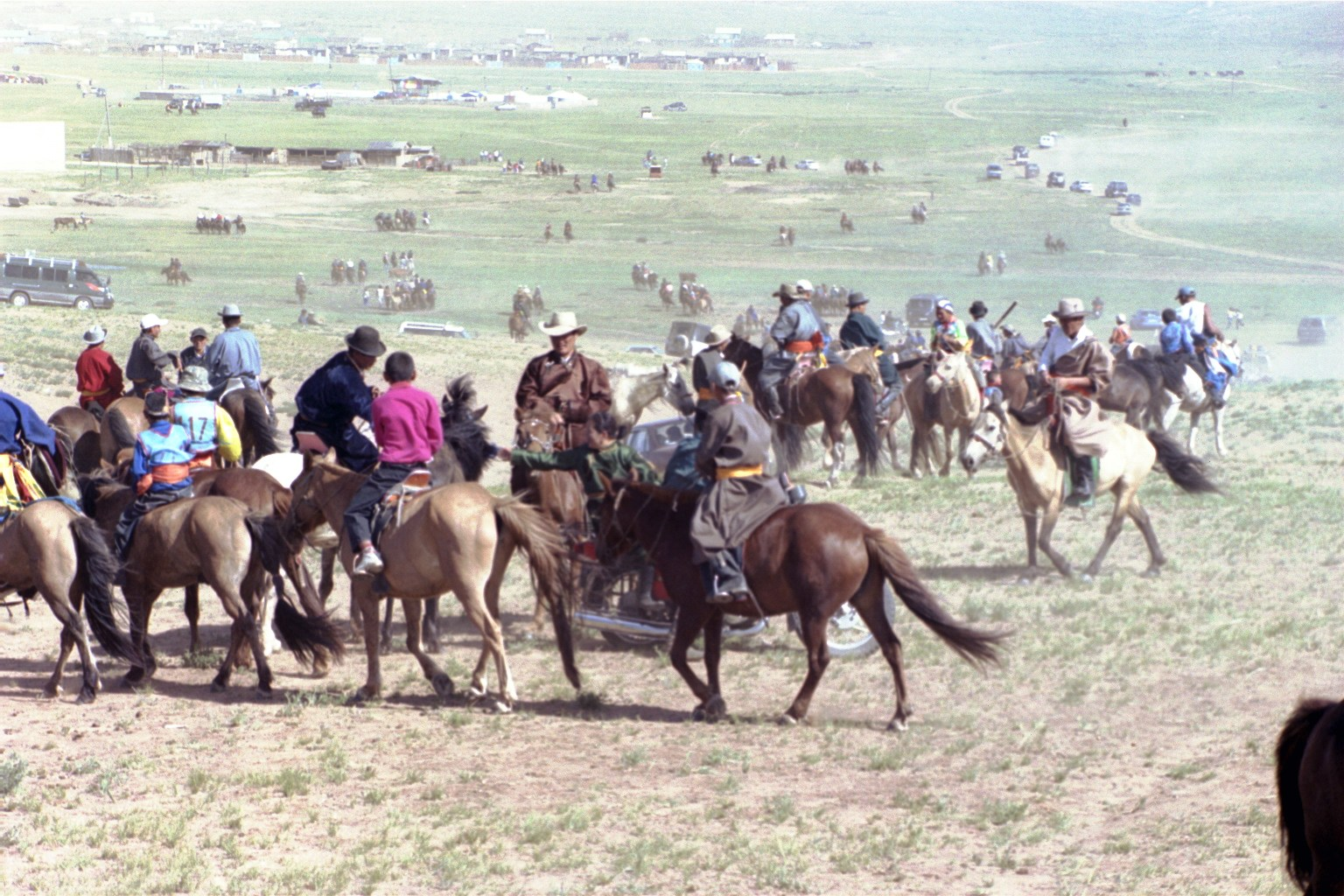
Riders in Mongolia during the Naadam festival

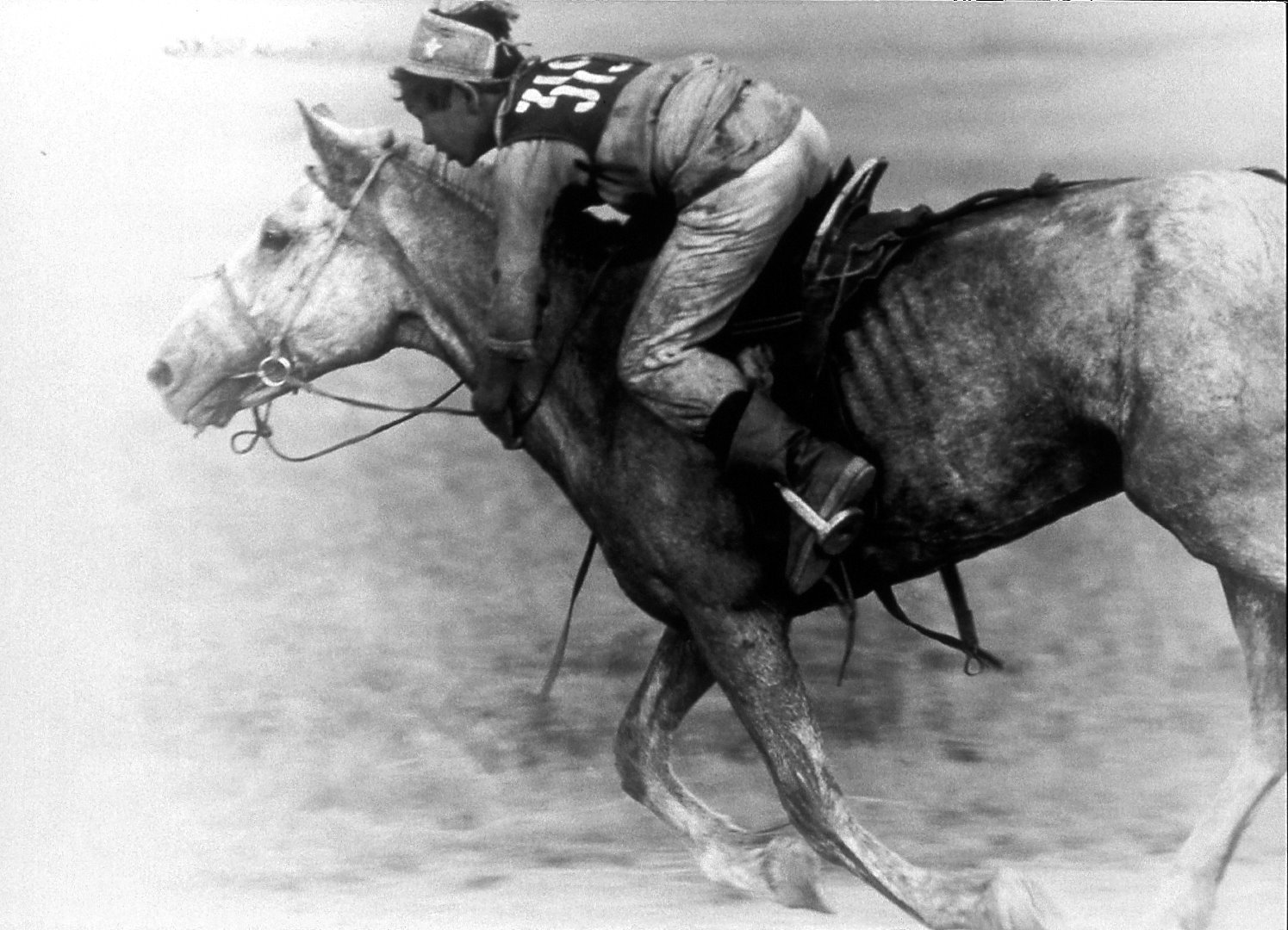
Rider during Naadam festival

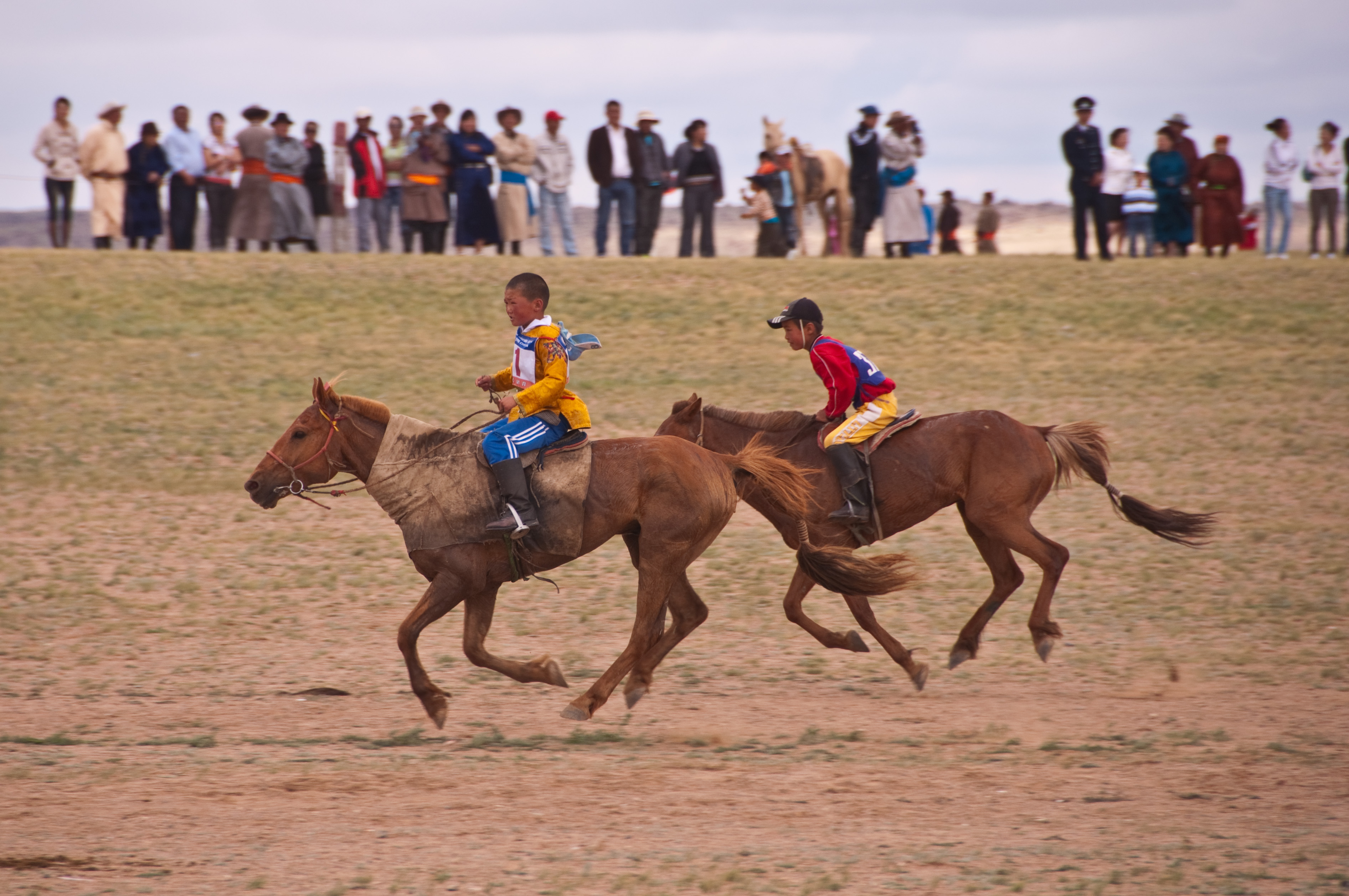
Two young riders across the finish line

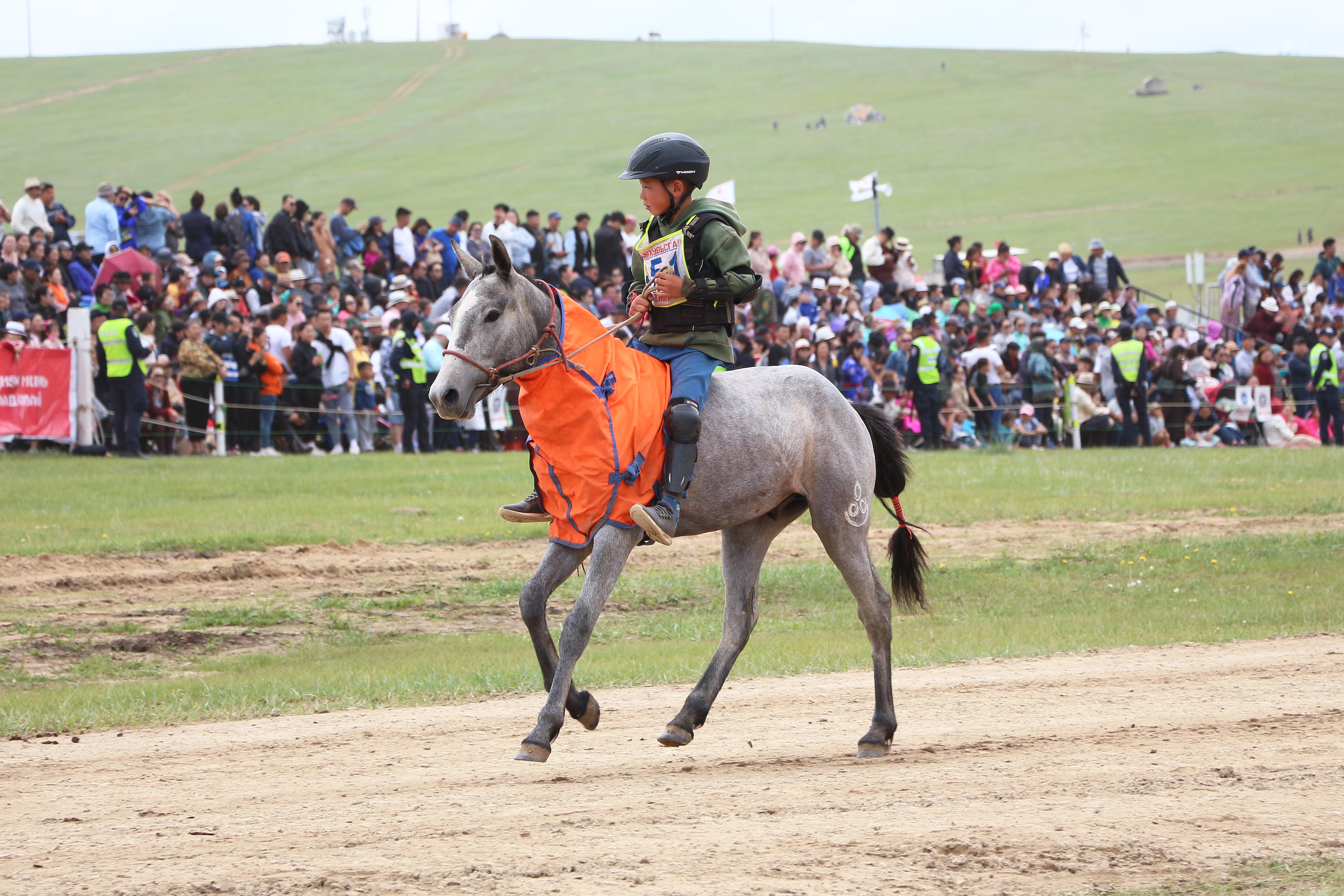
Rider during Naadam festival in Ulaanbaatar

=== Archery ===
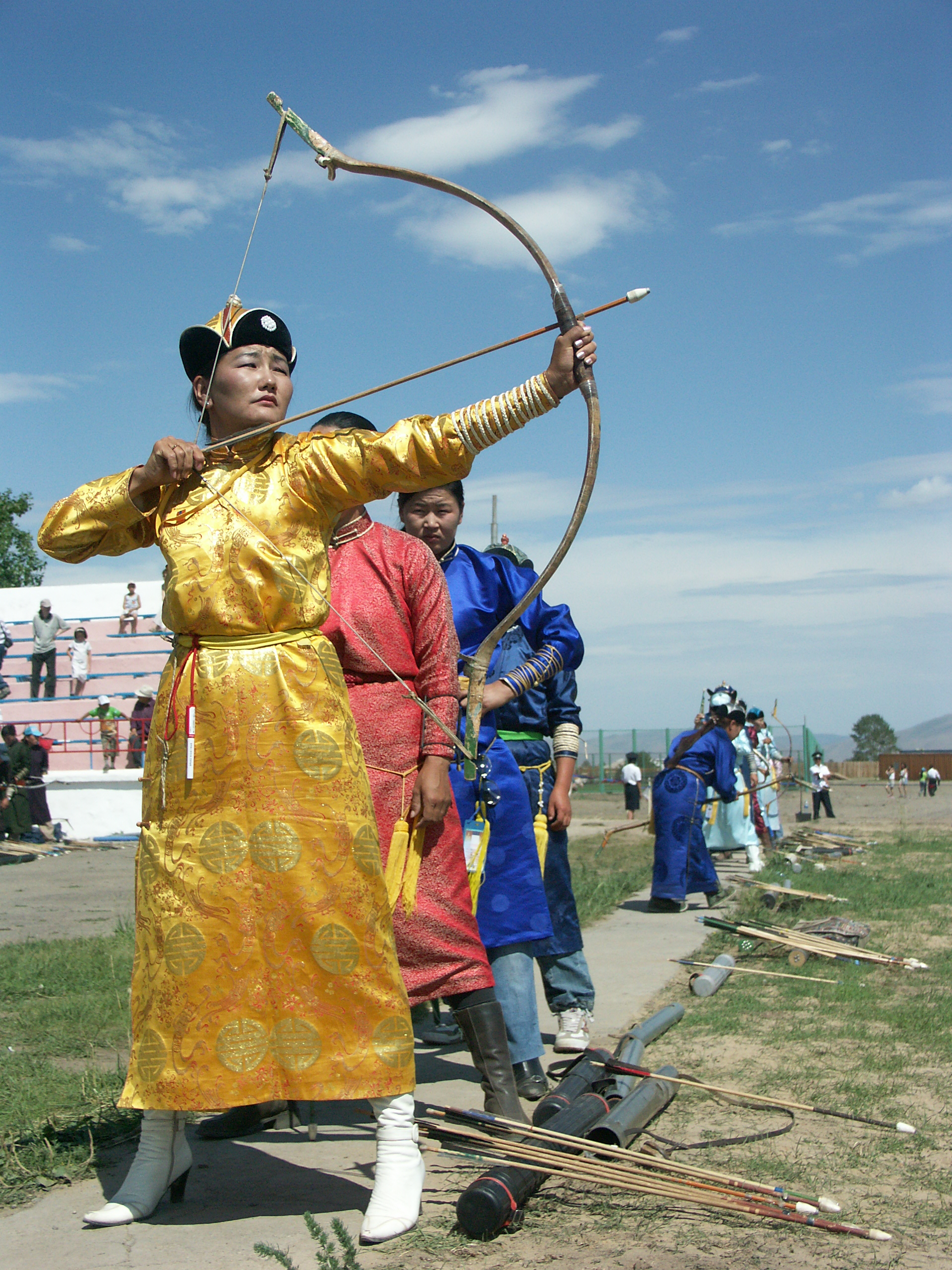
A women's archery competition held during the 2005 Naadam festival

In this competition both men and women may participate. It is played by teams of ten. Each archer is given four arrows; the team must hit 33 "surs". Men shoot their arrows from 75 meters away while women shoot theirs from 65 meters away. Traditionally the archers wear their national clothing (Deel) during the competition. All the archers wear leather bracers up to the elbow on their outstretched arm, so that the deel's cuff does not interfere with shooting.

Mongolian archery is unique for having dozens of surs as targets. Each sur is a small woven or wooden cylinder. They are placed on top of each other forming a wall three-high, which is approximately eight inches high by five feet wide. Knocking a sur out of the wall with an arrow counts as a hit, though knocking a sur out of the centre will bring a competitor more points. When the archer hits the target, the judge says uuhai which means "hooray". After each hit, an official repairs the damaged wall and makes it ready for the next attempt. The winners of the contest are granted the titles of "national marksman" and "national markswoman".

== See also ==
- Tsagaan Sar (English "White Moon"), the Mongolian Lunar New Year (the first most important Mongolian holiday before Naadam).
- Great Kurultáj
- Kurultai
- Sabantuy
- The World Qoroltai of the Bashkirs
- Qurultay of the Crimean Tatar People
- UNESCO Intangible Cultural Heritage Lists
