= Jamyangiin Chuluun =

Mongolian composer, conductor, and violinist

Jamyangiin Chuluun (Mongolian: Жамъянгийн Чулуун; 1928 – 1996) was a Mongolian composer, conductor and violinist.

Chuluun was born in the Jargalant sum of Khovd aimag in Mongolia. From 1939 he began working at the Töv (central) theatre and learned the violin studying with the soviet guest artist Boris Fyodorovich Smirnov and others. From 1950 until into the 1960s he worked at the same theater as a musician and at the Khovd Teacher's Academy as violin instructor.

From 1960–1988 he worked at the National Theater of Opera and Ballet, and after that as principal conductor and art director at the National Philharmonic, where he led the production of more than 20 opera and ballet works.

== Notable compositions ==
- Collage for violin and orchestra, 1949
- Variations on two Folksongs, violin and orchestra, 1951
- "Melody" (Аялгуу, Ayalguu), violin ensemble, 1972
- "Skillful Khas" (Уран хас, uran khas), ballet, 1973
- "Mountain brook" (Уулын горхи, Uulyn gorkhi), violin ensemble, 1975
- Film scores
