= Bilegiin Damdinsüren =

Mongolian composer of the national anthem (1919–1992)

Bilegiin Damdinsüren (Mongolian: Билэгийн Дамдинсүрэн; 1919–1992) was a Mongolian composer, considered to be one of the greatest Mongolian composers and founder of Mongolian classical music. He was noted for composing operas which incorporated traditional folk melodies and is credited with composing the most popular Mongolian opera, The Three Sad Hills (1935).
