= Sembiin Gonchigsumlaa =

Mongolian composer

Sembiin Gonchigsumlaa (Mongolian: Сэмбийн Гончигсумлаа; 1915-1991) was a Mongolian composer, generally considered to have been one of the greatest contributors to modern Mongolian national music and classical music. He is credited with being the first to write Mongolian ballet music. He was also a Merited Artiste and Chairman of the Composers' Union.

== Selected works ==
=== Symphonic music ===
- Symphonic poem, 1950
- Symphony, 1952
- Symphonic poem about the Mongolian People's Revolutionary Party, 1955
- Symphony No. 1, 1964
- Symphony No. 2, 1974
- Symphony No. 3 (in memory of G. Dmitrov), 1982
- Piano Concerto, 1983
- Cello Concerto, 1985
- Symphony No. 4, 1986
- Symphony No. 5 (in memory of E. Telman), 1988

=== For Piano ===
- 24 Preludes for Piano, 1978 and 1979

Gonchigsumlaa also composed more than 200 compositions for piano based on folk songs and his own themes.
