= Mongolian Armed Forces =

Combined military forces of Mongolia

- Монгол Улсын Зэвсэгт Хүчин
- Emblem of the Mongolian Armed Forces

- Banner of the Mongolian Armed Forces
- Founded: 18 March 1921; 105 years ago People's Revolution
- Current form: 12 February 1992; 34 years ago
- Service branches: Mongolian Ground Force; Mongolian Air Force; Construction and Engineering Forces; Special Forces; Cyber Security Forces
- Headquarters: Ulaanbaatar, Mongolia
- Website: mod.gov.mn

Leadership
- Commander-in-Chief: President Ukhnaagiin Khürelsükh
- Minister for Defense: Dambyn Batlut
- Chief of General Staff: Major general Sünreviin Ganbyamba

Personnel
- Military age: 18
- Conscription: 12 months
- Active personnel: 35,000
- Reserve personnel: 230,000

Expenditure
- Budget: $210 million (2019)
- Percent of GDP: 1.5%

Industry
- Foreign suppliers: Belgium; China; Czech Republic; France; Germany; Hungary; Indonesia; Israel; Italy; Japan; South Korea; Poland; Russia; Taiwan; Turkey; Ukraine; United Kingdom; United States

Related articles
- History: Army of the Mongol Empire; Mongolian People's Army
- Ranks: Mongolian military ranks

The Mongolian Armed Forces (Mongolian: Монгол Улсын Зэвсэгт Хүчин, romanized: Mongol Ulsyn zevsegt hüchin) is the collective name for the Mongolian military and the joint forces that comprise it. It is tasked with protecting the independence, sovereignty, and territorial integrity of Mongolia. Defined as the peacetime configuration, its current structure consists of five branches: the Mongolian Ground Force, Mongolian Air Force, Construction and Engineering Forces, cyber security, and special forces. In case of a war situation, the Border Troops, Internal Troops, Judicial enforcement agency and National Emergency Management Agency can be reorganized into the armed forces structure. The General Staff of the Mongolian Armed Forces is the highest professional military management organization of the state military organization and operates independently from the Ministry of Defense, its government controlled parent body. Mongolian military day is celebrated on 18 March, similar to Defender of the Fatherland Day in Russia and PLA Day in China.

== History ==
=== Mongol Empire and post-imperial ===
As a unified state, Mongolia traces its origins to the Mongol Empire created by Genghis Khan in the 13th century. Genghis Khan unified the various tribes on the Mongolian plateau, and his descendants eventually conquered almost the entirety of Asia, the Middle East, and parts of Eastern and Central Europe.

The Mongol Army was organized into decimal units of tens, hundreds, thousands, and ten thousands. A notable feature of the army is that it was composed entirely of cavalry units, giving it the advantage of maneuverability. Siege weaponry was adapted from other cultures, with foreign experts integrated into the command structure.

The Mongols rarely used naval power, with a few exceptions. In the 1260s and 1270s they used seapower while conquering the Song dynasty of China, though they were unable to mount successful seaborne campaigns against Japan due to storms and rough battles. Around the Eastern Mediterranean, their campaigns were almost exclusively land-based, with the seas being controlled by the Crusader and Mamluk forces.

With the disintegration of the Mongol Empire in the late 13th century, the Mongol Army as a unified unit also crumbled. The Mongols retreated to their homeland after the fall of the Mongol Yuan dynasty, and once again devolved into civil war. Although the Mongols became united once again during the reign of Queen Mandukhai and Batmongkhe Dayan Khan. In the 17th century they were annexed into the Qing dynasty.

=== Period under Qing Rule ===
Once Mongolia was under the Qing, the Mongol Armies were used to defeat the Ming dynasty, helping to consolidate Manchu Rule. Mongols proved a useful ally in the war, lending their expertise as cavalry archers. During most of the Qing dynasty time, the Mongols gave military assistance to the Manchus.

With the creation of the Eight Banners, Banner Armies were broadly divided along ethnic lines, namely Manchu and Mongol.

=== Bogd Khanate (1911–1919) ===
In 1911, Outer Mongolia declared its independence from Qing China as the Bogd Khaanate under the Bogd Khan. This initial independence did not last, with Mongolia being occupied successively by the Chinese Beiyang Government, and Baron Ungern's White Russian forces. The modern precursor to the Mongolian Armed Forces was placed, with men's conscription and a permanent military structure starting in 1912.

=== Mongolian People's Republic (1921–1992) ===
During the wake of the People's Revolution of 1921, the newly created Mongolian People's Party created a native communist army in March 1921 under the leadership of Damdin Sükhbaatar to fight against Russian troops from the White movement and remaining Chinese garrisons. The Mongolian revolutionaries were aided by the Soviet Red Army, which helped to secure control over Mongolia from adversaries. However, during the 1932 armed uprising in Mongolia and the initial Japanese border probes beginning in the mid-1930s, Soviet troops in Mongolia amounted to little more than instructors for the native army and as guards for diplomatic and trading installations.

==== Battles of Khalkhin Gol ====
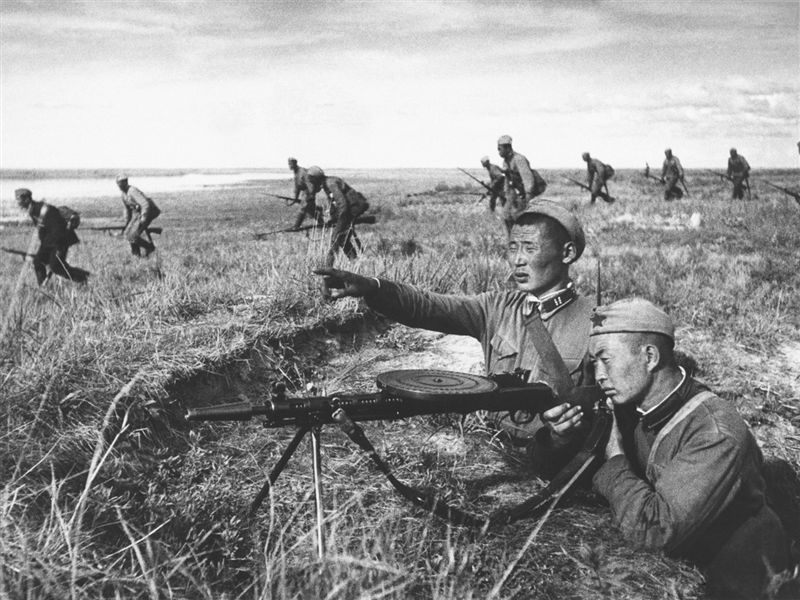
Mongolian People's Revolutionary Army soldiers fighting Japanese soldiers at Khalkhin Gol in 1939.

The border clashes along Khalkhin Gol began on 11 May 1939. A Mongolian cavalry unit of some 70–90 men had entered the disputed area in search of grazing for their horses. On that day, cavalry of Manchukuo attacked the Mongolians and drove them back across the Khalkhin Gol. On 13 May, the Mongolian force returned in greater numbers and the Manchukoans were unable to dislodge them.

On 14 May, Lt. Col. Yaozo Azuma led the reconnaissance regiment of 23rd Infantry Division, supported by the 64th Infantry Regiment of the same division, under Colonel Takemitsu Yamagata, into the territory and the Mongolians withdrew. Soviet and Mongolian troops returned to the disputed region, however, and Azuma's force again moved to evict them. This time things turned out differently, as the Soviet–Mongolian forces surrounded Azuma's force on 28 May and destroyed it. The Azuma force suffered eight officers and 97 men killed and one officer and 33 men wounded, for 63% total casualties. The commander of the Soviet forces and the Far East Front was Comandarm Grigory Shtern from May 1938.

Both sides began building up their forces in the area: soon Japan had 30,000 men in the theater. The Soviets dispatched a new Corps commander, Comcor Georgy Zhukov, who arrived on 5 June and brought more motorized and armored forces (I Army Group) to the combat zone. Accompanying Zhukov was Comcor Yakov Smushkevich with his aviation unit. Zhamyangiyn Lhagvasuren, Corps Commissar of the Mongolian People's Revolutionary Army, was appointed Zhukov's deputy.

The Battles of Khalkhin Gol ended on 16 September 1939.

==== World War II and immediate aftermath ====
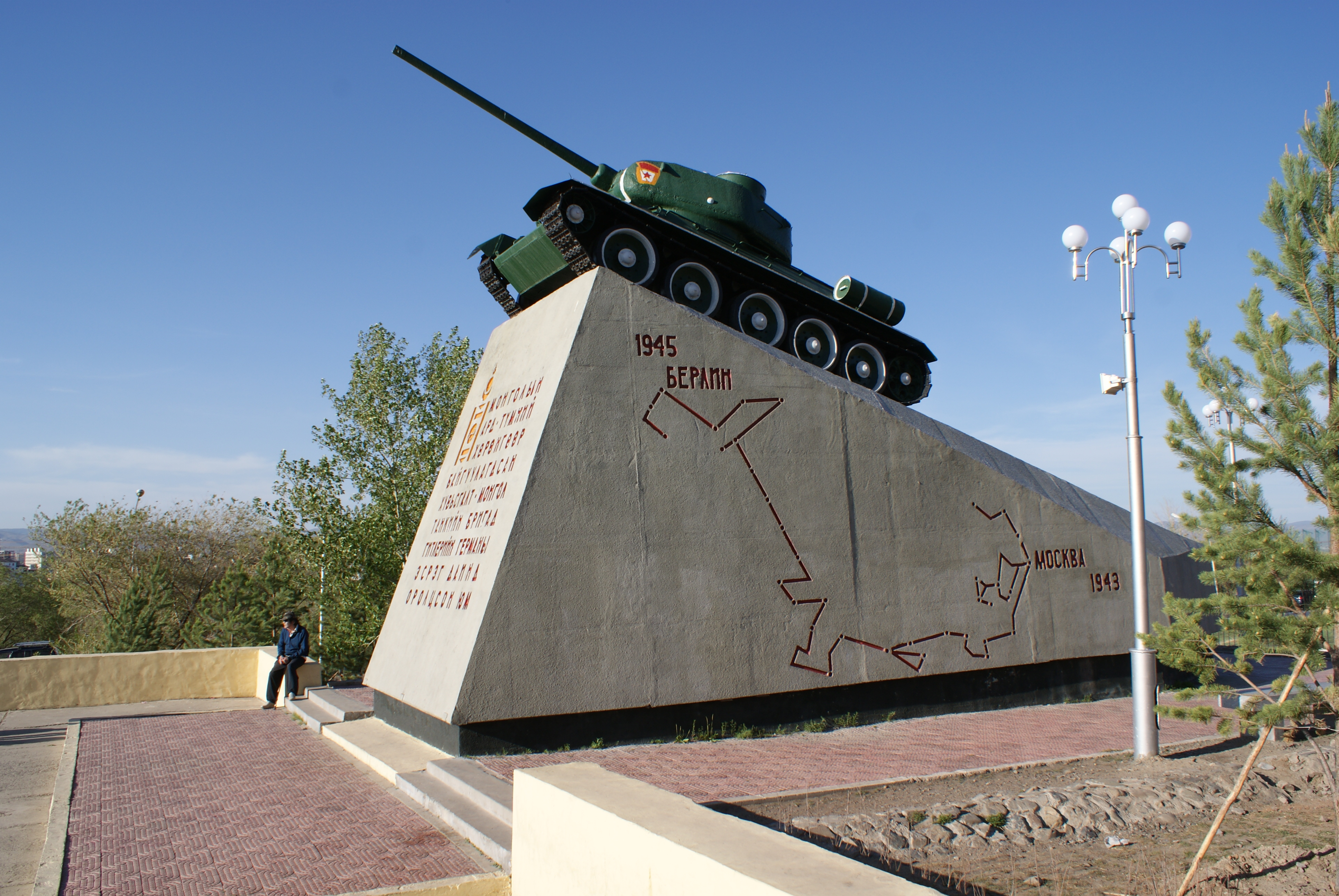
World War II memorial in Ulaanbaatar, popularly called the Tank Monument featuring a T-34-85 tank.

In the beginning stage of World War II, the Mongolian People's Army was involved in the Battle of Khalkhin Gol, when Japanese forces, together with the puppet state of Manchukuo, attempted to invade Mongolia from the Khalkha River. Soviet forces under the command of Georgy Zhukov, together with Mongolian forces, defeated the Japanese Sixth army and effectively ended the Soviet–Japanese border conflicts.

In 1945, Mongolian forces participated in the Soviet invasion of Manchuria under the command of the Red Army, among the last engagements of World War II. A Soviet–Mongolian Cavalry mechanized group under Issa Pliyev took part as part of the Soviet Transbaikal Front. Mongolian troops numbered four cavalry divisions and three other regiments. During 1946–1948, the Mongolian People's Army successfully repelled attacks from the Kuomintang's Hui regiment and their Kazakh allies in the border between Mongolia and Xinjiang. The attacks were propagated by the Ili Rebellion, a Soviet-backed revolt by the Second East Turkestan Republic against the Nationalist government. This little-known border dispute between Mongolia and the Republic of China became known as the Pei-ta-shan Incident.

These engagements would be the last active battles the Mongolian Army would see, until after the democratic revolution.

=== Since 1990 ===
Mongolia underwent a democratic revolution in 1990, ending the communist one-party state that had existed since the early 1920s. In 2002, a law was passed that enabled Mongolian Army and police forces to conduct UN-backed and other international peacekeeping missions abroad. In August 2003, Mongolia contributed troops to the Iraq War as part of the Multi-National Force – Iraq. Mongolian troops, numbering 180 at its peak, were under Multinational Division Central-South and were tasked with guarding the main Polish base, Camp Echo. Prior to that posting, they had been protecting a logistics base dubbed Camp Charlie in Hillah.

Then-Chairman of the Joint Chiefs of Staff, General Richard Myers, visited Ulaanbaatar on 13 January 2004 and expressed his appreciation for the deployment of a 173-strong contingent to Iraq. He then inspected the 150th Peacekeeping Battalion, which was planned to send a fresh force to replace the first contingent later in January 2004. All troops were withdrawn on 25 September 2008.

Military medical professionals at a closing ceremony for Khaan Quest 2013 in Ulaanbaatar.

In June 2005, Batzorigiyn Erdenebat, the Vice Minister of National Defense, told Jane's Defence Weekly that the deployment of forces in Mongolia was changing away from its Cold War, southern-orientated against China posture. "Under Mongolia's regional development concept the country has been divided into four regions, each incorporating several provinces. The largest capital city in each region will become the regional center and we will establish regional military headquarters in each of those cities," he said. However, at the time, implementation had been delayed.

In 2009, Mongolia sent 114 troops as part of the International Security Assistance Force to Afghanistan. The troops were sent, backing the U.S. surge in troop numbers. Mongolian forces in Afghanistan mostly assist NATO/International Security Assistance Force personnel in training on the former Warsaw Pact weapons that comprise the bulk of the military equipment available to the Afghan National Army.

In 2021, on the occasion of the 100th anniversary of the armed forces, it was awarded the Order of Genghis Khan by President Khaltmaagiin Battulga.

== Peacekeeping operations ==
Mongolia passed legislation enabling it to contribute to peacekeeping missions in 2002, deploying two military observers to the United Nations Mission for the Referendum in Western Sahara, and another two officers to the United Nations Mission in the Democratic Republic of the Congo. From 2005–2006, Mongolian troops served under NATO command as part of the Belgian KFOR contingent in Kosovo. In 2006 it deployed a 250-person contingent to the United Nations Mission in Liberia, the country's first sizeable contribution to UN peacekeeping.

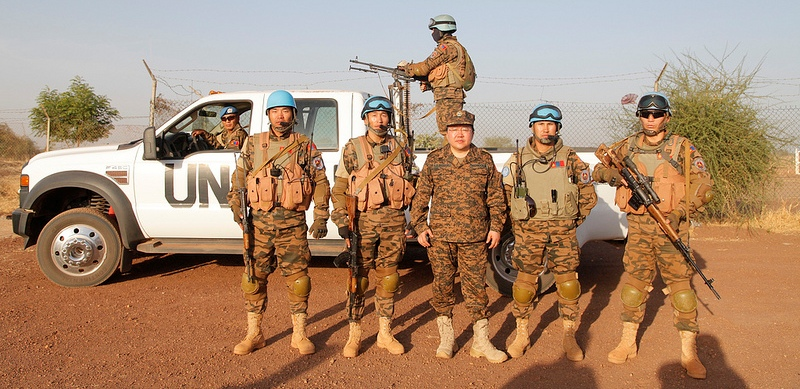
President Tsakhiagiin Elbegdorj inspecting Mongolian peacekeepers in South Sudan, February 2013

In 2011, the government decided to deploy its first fully self-sustained forces to UNMISS in South Sudan, conducting peacekeeping duties in Unity State, with officers deployed at the Force Headquarters and Sector Headquarters. The first general officer deployed in this mission as Brigade Commander was in 2014.

Japan Ground Self-Defense Force soldiers during a multinational UN Peacekeeping Operations exercise in Mongolia, 2026

Mongolian armed forces have performed peacekeeping missions in South Sudan, Chad, Georgia, Ethiopia, Eritrea, Congo, Western Sahara, Sudan (Darfur), Iraq, Afghanistan, and in Sierra Leone under the mandate of the United Nations Mission in Liberia. As of 2024, Mongolia has the 28th most peacekeepers contributed to UN missions. Mongolia has contributed a total of about 19,000 UN peacekeeping personnel as of 2022, 900 of which have been women, ranking 20th among contributing countries.

Peacekeeping battalions in the Mongolian forces may include the 084th Special Task Battalion, and the 330th and 350th Special Task Battalion.

== Military policy ==
Mongolia has a unique military policy due to its geopolitical position and economic situation. Being between two of the world's largest nations, the Mongolian Armed Forces have a limited capability to protect its independence against foreign invasions; the country's national security therefore depends strongly on diplomacy, a notable part of which is the third neighbor policy. The country's military ideal is to create and maintain a small but efficient and professional armed forces.

== Organization ==
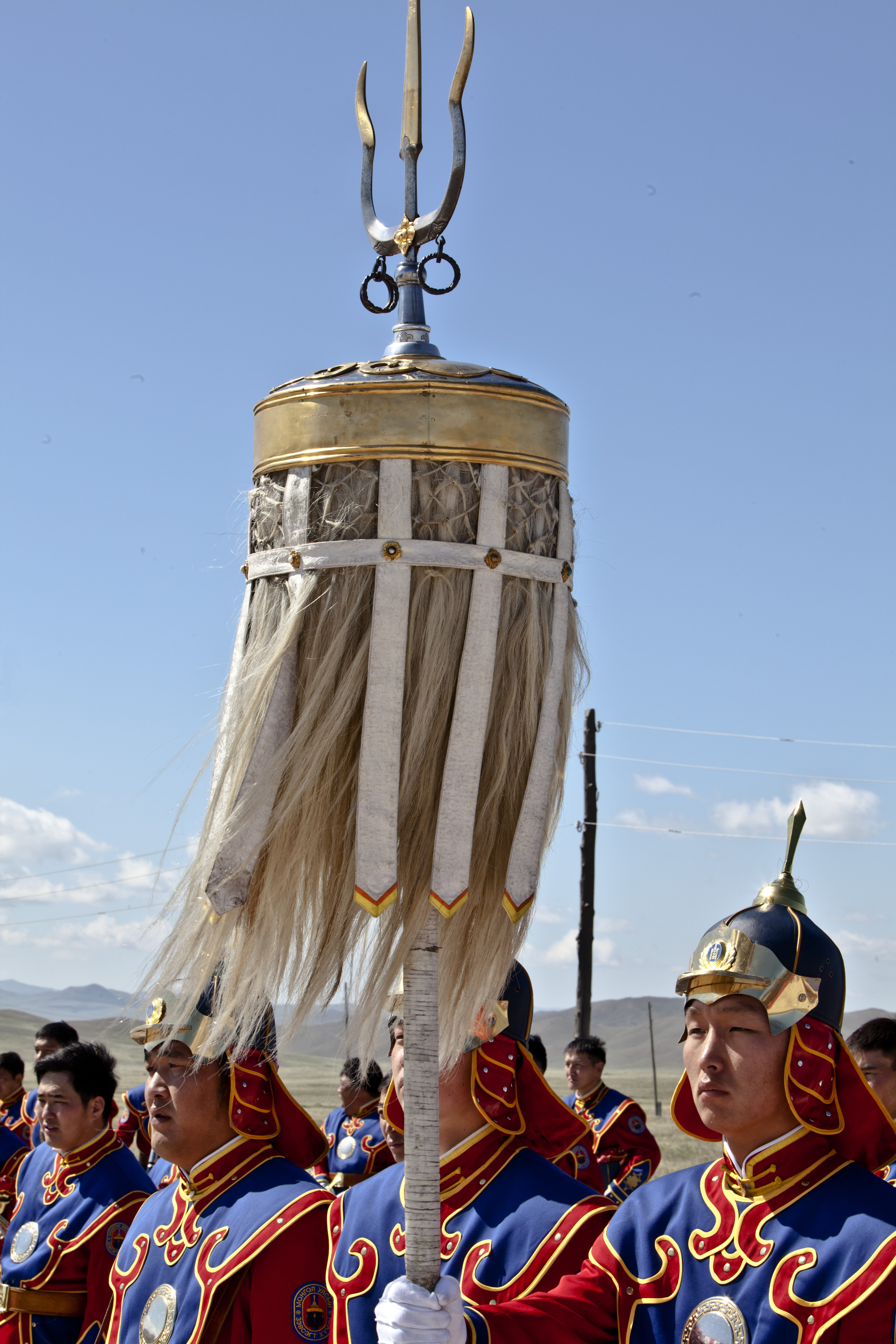
The Mongolian State Honor Guard holding the White Banner of the Mongols.

=== Higher leadership ===
The military order of precedence is as follows:

- President of Mongolia (Commander-in-Chief)
- Minister of Defense
- Deputy Ministers of Defense
- Chief of the General Staff of the Armed Forces
- Deputy Chiefs of the General Staff of the Armed Forces
- Service branch commanders

=== Branches ===
==== Ground Force ====
The Ground Forces possess over 470 tanks, 650 Infantry Fighting Vehicles and armored personnel carriers, 500 mobile anti-aircraft weapons, more than 700 artillery and mortar and other military equipment. Most of them are old Soviet Union models designed between the late 1950s to early 1980s. There are a smaller number of newer models designed in post-Soviet Russia.

==== Air Force ====
On 25 May 1925 a Junkers F.13 entered service as the first aircraft in Mongolian civil and military aviation. By 1935 Soviet aircraft were based in the country. In May 1937 the air force was renamed the Mongolian People's Republic Air Corps. During 1939–1945 the Soviets delivered Polikarpov I-15s, Polikarpov I-16s, Yak-9s and Ilyushin Il-2s. By 1966 the first SA-2 SAM units entered service, and the air force was renamed the Air Force of the Mongolian People's Republic. The MiG-15, UTI and MiG-17 the first combat jet aircraft in the Mongolian inventory, entered service in 1970 and by the mid-1970s was joined by MiG-21s, Mi-8s and Ka-26s.

After the end of the Cold War and the advent of the Democratic Revolution, the air force was effectively grounded due to a lack of fuel and spare parts. However, the government has been trying to revive the air force since 2001. The country has the goal of developing a full air force in the future.

In 2011, the Ministry of Defense announced that they would buy MiG-29s from Russia by the end of the year, but this did not materialize. In October 2012 the Ministry of Defense returned a loaned Airbus A310-300 to MIAT Mongolian Airlines. From 2007 to 2011 the active fleet of MiG-21s was reduced. In 2013 the Air Force examined the possibility of buying three C-130J transport airplanes, manufactured by Lockheed Martin. Left without Russian aid, the Mongolian air force inventory gradually reduced to a few Antonov An-24/26 tactical airlifters and a dozen airworthy Mi-24 and Mi-8 helicopters.

On 26 January 2019 received a first Sukhoi Su-30SM "Flanker-H" multirole fighter aircraft from Russia. According Commander Mongolian Air Forces Colonel Enkhbayar said, the delivered aircraft are the remaining four Su-30SMs ordered under this first contract. Mongolian Air Forces a framework agreement signed its intention to buy 12 Su-30SMs from Russia. The total cost of the contract is $600 million

On 26 November 2019 Russia donated two MiG-29 fighter aircraft to Mongolia, which then became the only combat-capable fighter jets in its air force.

==== Construction and Engineering Forces ====
Mongolian military engineers with the 017 Construction Regiment receive instructions before participating in Khaan Quest 2013.

Mongolian soldiers march past an international delegation during the closing ceremony for Khaan Quest 2013 at Five Hills Training Area.

Since 1963, large-scale construction work has been a military affair, with the Council of Ministers on 8 January 1964 establishing the General Construction Military Agency under the Ministry of Defense. In addition, a large number of construction military units have been established. The work create a new construction and engineering army began in 2010. The Ministry of Defense and the General Staff of the Armed Forces have established six civil engineering units over the last 10 years.

==== Cyber Security Forces ====
The Armed Forces Cyber Security Center has been established under the General Staff of the Armed Forces. A project to upgrade the Armed Forces' information and communication network, conduct integrated monitoring, detect cyber attacks, and install response equipment is expected to be completed in August 2021. A decision has been made to build a Data Center for the Armed Forces' Cyber Security Center. This will be the basis for the creation of a Cyber Security Force.

==== Special Forces ====
The Special Forces units (Mongolian: Тусгай хүчин) in Mongolia is the 084th Special Task Battalion, 150th, 330th Special Task Battalion, 350th Special Task Battalion.

==== Navy ====
Mongolia has a nominal navy, which is one of the world's smallest and operates on Lake Khövsgöl, not the ocean. Established in the 1930s and later privatized in 1997, the force consists of about seven personnel and one or two vessels (the Sukhbaatar III), primarily serving tourism and local transportation needs rather than military purposes.

== Personnel ==
=== Military education ===
In October 1943, the Sükhbaatar Officers' School was opened to train personnel of the Mongolian Army in accordance with the experience of the Red Army during the Second World War. The National Defense University serves as the main educational institution of the armed forces. The NDU is composed of the following education institutions: Defense Management Academy, Defense Research Institute, Academic Education Institute, Military Institute, Military Music College, NCO College. In 1994, the MNDU maintained a border protection faculty, which would later be expanded to establish the Border Troops Institute and what would later become the Law Enforcement University of Mongolia.

=== Conscription ===
The legal basis of conscription is the Universal Military Service Act. Men are conscripted between the ages of 18 and 25 for a one-year tour of duty. Mongolian men receive their conscription notices through their local administrative unit. Reserve service is still required up until the age of 45.

=== Women in the Armed Forces ===
Mongolian army sergeant training with the U.S. Army Alaska at Joint Base Elmendorf-Richardson, 3 November 2015.

More than 20 percent of the total personnel of the Armed Forces are women, who work mainly in communications, logistics and medical sectors. In addition, female members of the Armed Forces have been active in UN peacekeeping operations. Major N. Nyamjargal was the first female member of the Armed Forces to serve as a UN-mandated military observer in Western Sahara in 2007. A total of 12 women have served in the Western Sahara and Sierra Leone.

Policies in recent years have been aimed at making female military service more equitable. Most women are assigned duties in the kitchen facilities and the barracks, as they are subject to many gender inequalities.

In 2022, Bolor Ganbold became the first woman to attain the rank of brigadier general in the Armed Forces. She had previously been one of the first women to enlist in 1994.

=== Military courts ===
On 16 March 1921, a joint meeting of the Provisional People's Government and the members of the Central Committee of the MPRP decided to establish a "Military Judicial Office under the Ministry of Defense". In 1928, the government approved the “Charter of the Red Army Judiciary” and the Military Judiciary established under the Ministry of Justice. This was disbanded a year later and the Military College of the Supreme Court was established. It was composed of the Khovd Regional Military Court, the Eastern Military Court, and the Military Courts of the 1st Cavalry Division (Ulaanbaatar). The military court were referred to as "special courts" at the time and dealt with criminal and civil cases involving military personnel. In 1929, the Provisional Court and the General Military Court were dissolved, and the Military College of the Supreme Court was subordinated to the three former military units. The Military College was dissolved in 1954, and was re-established in 1971.

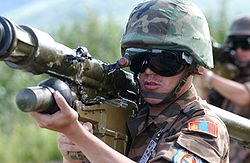
Soldier of the Mongolian Armed Forces with Strela-2

In connection with the change in the staffing, the parliament ordered in 1993 the abolition of the All-Military Special Court and the Special Military Court of First Instance, transferring the assets used by the Military Courts to the General Council of the Judiciary. All activities of the Military Court system is supervised by the Military Collegium.
