= Mongolian Ground Force =

Land branch of the Mongolian Armed Forces

- Монгол Улсын Зэвсэгт хүчний Хуурай замын цэрэг
- Emblem of the Mongolian Ground Force
- Founded: February 1992 (replacing the Mongolian People's Army)
- Country: Mongolia
- Type: Army
- Role: Land warfare
- Size: 35,000 active personnel(and 230,000 reserve, 50,000 paramilitary)
- Part of: Mongolian Armed Forces
- March: "The Red Banner March" (Тугийн марш/Tugiin Marsh)
- Engagements: Mongolian Revolution of 1921; 1932 armed uprising in Mongolia; Soviet-Japanese Border War; Battles of Khalkhin Gol; Soviet invasion of Manchuria; Battle of Baitag Bogd

Commanders
- Commander: Brigadier-General; B. Amgalanbaatar
- Chief of Staff: Brigadier-General; L. Ontsgoibayar

Insignia
- Flag

- Combat Banner

The Ground Force of Mongolia (Mongolian: Монгол Улсын Зэвсэгт хүчний Хуурай замын цэрэг, romanized: Mongol Ulsyn Zevsegt hüchniy Huurai zamyn tsereg, lit. 'Mongolian Land Force of the Armed Forces') is the land force of the Mongolian Armed Forces, formed from parts of the former Mongolian People's Army in 1992. It was known as the "Mongolian General Purpose Force" (Mongolian: Монгол Улсын Ерөнхий Цэргийн Хүчин) until 2016.

== History ==
At present Mongolia's armed forces have become more compact and professional since obligatory military service was replaced with the alternative between military and other service. The ground force, a core of the armed forces, are the main force to defend the country by military means. In peacetime, the ground force direct their activities toward ensuring the mobilization readiness of the Mongolian Armed Forces, providing military training for the population, forming personnel resources, and organizing the maintenance, protection and servicing of military equipment and material reserves. Depending on the organizational specifics of military units and organizations, the ground force are divided into combat, on-combat-duty, training, training combat, and stockpile and service units.

As a result of reform processes started in 1997, units of the Mongolian Armed Forces were reorganized into a brigade-battalion system. In peacetime, sub-units of brigades have a mixed personnel organization (i.e. of constant combat readiness, training, and under strength). In 2016, the General Purpose Force was renamed to its current name of Ground Force of the Armed Forces. In 1997 the Mongolian Armed Forces had in service 650 tanks, 120 light armored reconnaissance vehicles, 400 armored infantry fighting vehicles, 300 armored personnel carriers, 300 towed artillery, 130 multiple rocket launchers, 140 mortars, and 200 anti-tank guns. Mongolia deployed its troops to peacekeeping operations in Iraq and Afghanistan with 1970s Soviet-bloc weapons, transportation, and equipment. Although Mongolian troops are highly skilled with using these weapons and equipment, they are not interoperable with the rest of the coalition members. Except for the United States-provided Harris Corporation communications equipment, Mongolia had no other equipment which was interoperable. From January 14 to 18 in 2008, Chief of the General Staff of the MAF Lieutenant General Tsevegsuren Togoo signed an agreement for acquisition of equipment and vehicles from Russia for 120 million US dollars during his official visit to Moscow.

== Structure ==
List of units of the Mongolian Ground Force
Name	City and Country	Native Name	Notes
013th Military Unit		013 дугаар анги	Known as the "Federal Special Committee", it was established in 1929 under the Ministry of Defense. It was established with the purpose to liaise with the Khovd, Uliastai, Khentii, and Bayantumen military committees and units of the Special Soum of the Federal Ministry. It historically took part in the Zorgol, Kherlen-73, and Gobi-77 exercises in cooperation with the Soviet Union. In addition, it took part in peacekeeping operations in Iraq, Sierra Leone, Chad, South and North Sudan. In 1936, it was awarded the Order of the Polar Star. On its 90th anniversary in 2019, it was awarded the Order of the Red Banner. It is named after Rashmaagiin Gavaa.
014th Construction Unit		Зэвсэгт хүчний барилгын 014-р анги	
016th Mechanized Brigade	Sergelen near Ulaanbaatar	Зэвсэгт хүчний механикжсан 016-р бригад	It has been reported as the oldest formation of the Mongolian Army. The unit was established in 1923 by the order of General Sukhbaatar as the "Armored Carriage Arrow". Since then, it had been renamed after Butochiyn Tsog. In 2012, it was expanded into a motorized shooting brigade. The youngest general of the country, Brigadier General L. Ontsgoibayar, was appointed as the commander of the brigade.
017th Construction Regiment		Зэвсэгт хүчний барилгын 017-р анги	It is named after Major General K. Judernamjil, Honored Builder of Mongolia. It served as the basis for the Construction and Engineering Forces.
029th Military Unit		029 дугаар анги	
032nd Military Unit	Ulaanbaatar		Honor Guard, Military Police
084th Special Task Battalion		Зэвсэгт хүчний 084-р анги	
110th Military Unit	Orkhon Province	110 дугаар анги	
119th Military Unit		119 дугаар анги	It is known as the Special Battalion for Chemical Defense of the Army.
123rd Military Unit	Khovd Province	123 дугаар анги	It was formed in 1922. It is named after field commander S.Magsarjav.
150th (Peacekeeping) Military Unit		150 дүгээр анги	In 2010, it was trained by US Marines.
167th Military Unit	Ömnögovi Province	167 дугаар анги	It is an artillery unit. It was founded August 7, 1973 by order of Minister of Defense Batyn Dorj as part of the 1st Special Motorized Rifle Brigade of the People's Army in Dalanzadgad. It is named after Zhamyangiyn Lhagvasuren.
186th Military Unit	Orkhon Province	186 дугаар анги	
323rd Military Unit	Dornod Province	323 дугаар анги	
327th Military Unit	Choibalsan	327 дугаар анги	
330th (Peacekeeping) Military Unit			
331st Special Battalion			
337th Military Unit	Nalaikh	337 дугаар анги	
339th Construction Unit	Bayankhongor Province	Зэвсэгт хүчний барилгын 339-р анги	
350th (Peacekeeping) Military Unit		350 дугаар анги	

== Peacekeeping missions ==
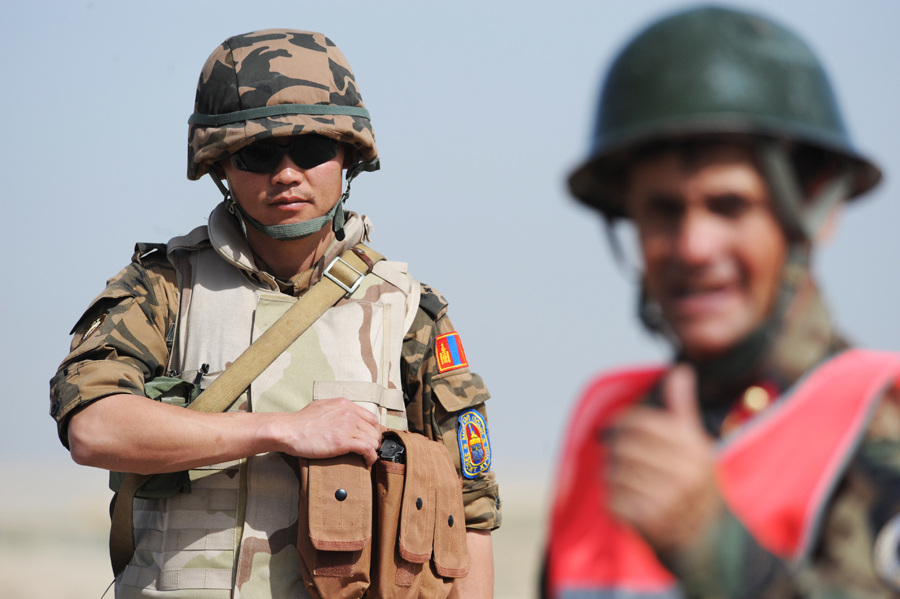
Afghan National Army artillerymen are advised by soldiers of the Mongolian Ground Forces during a training exercise in May 2010 at the Kabul Military Training Center.

Mongolian armed forces are performing peacekeeping missions in South Sudan, Sierra Leone, Ethiopia, Congo, Eritrea, Western Sahara, and Afghanistan, and with the United Nations Mission in Liberia. In 2005 and 2006, Mongolian troops also served as part of the Belgian KFOR contingent in Kosovo. From 2009 the Mongolian Armed Forces deploying its largest peace keeping mission to Chad and the government is planning to deploy its first fully self-sufficient UN mission there in mid-2011.

== Gallery ==
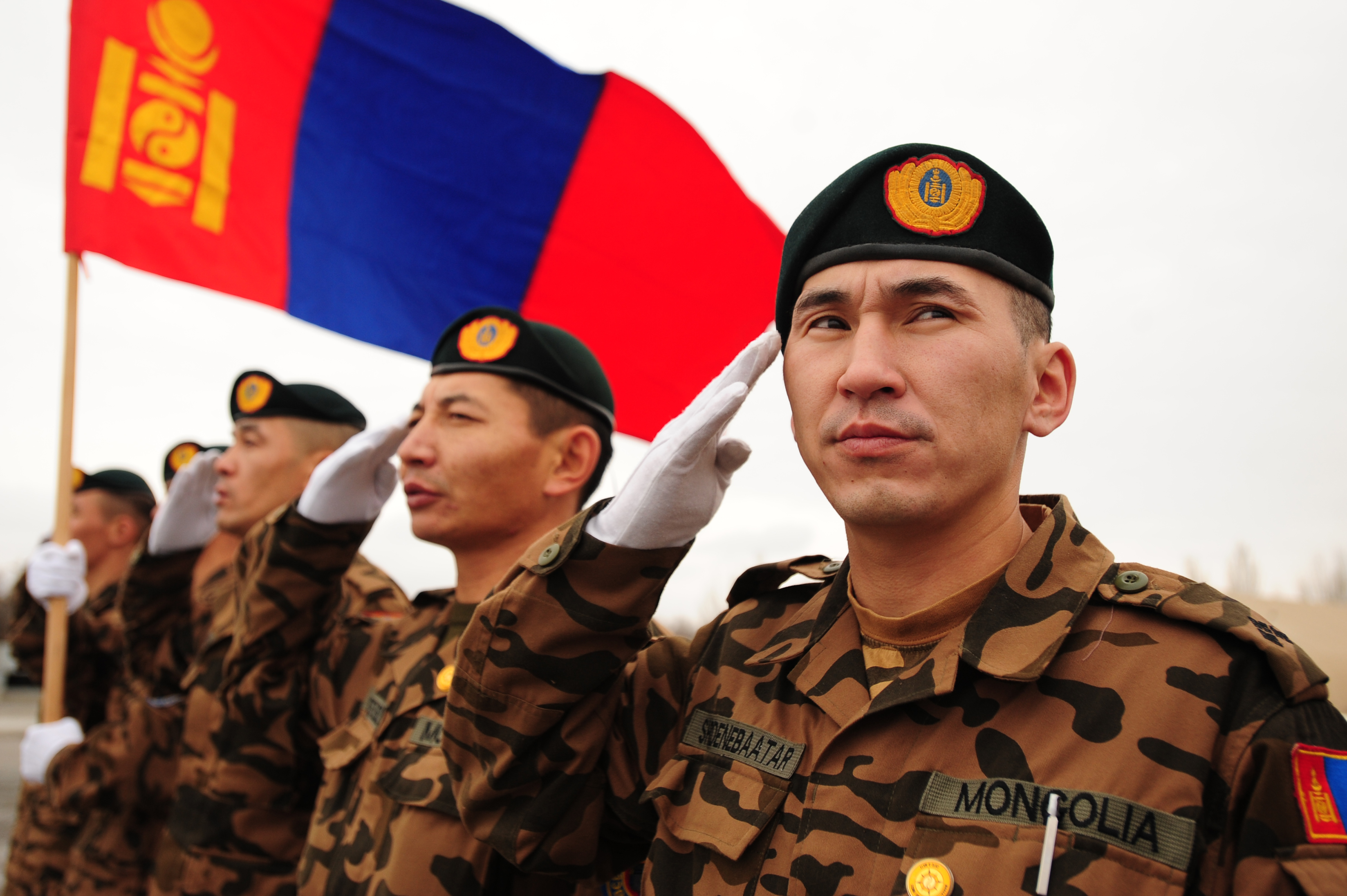
Mongolian soldiers salute while the Mongolian flag waves at the Transit Center at Manas, where they stayed for several days before moving forward to Afghanistan to support Operation Enduring Freedom.

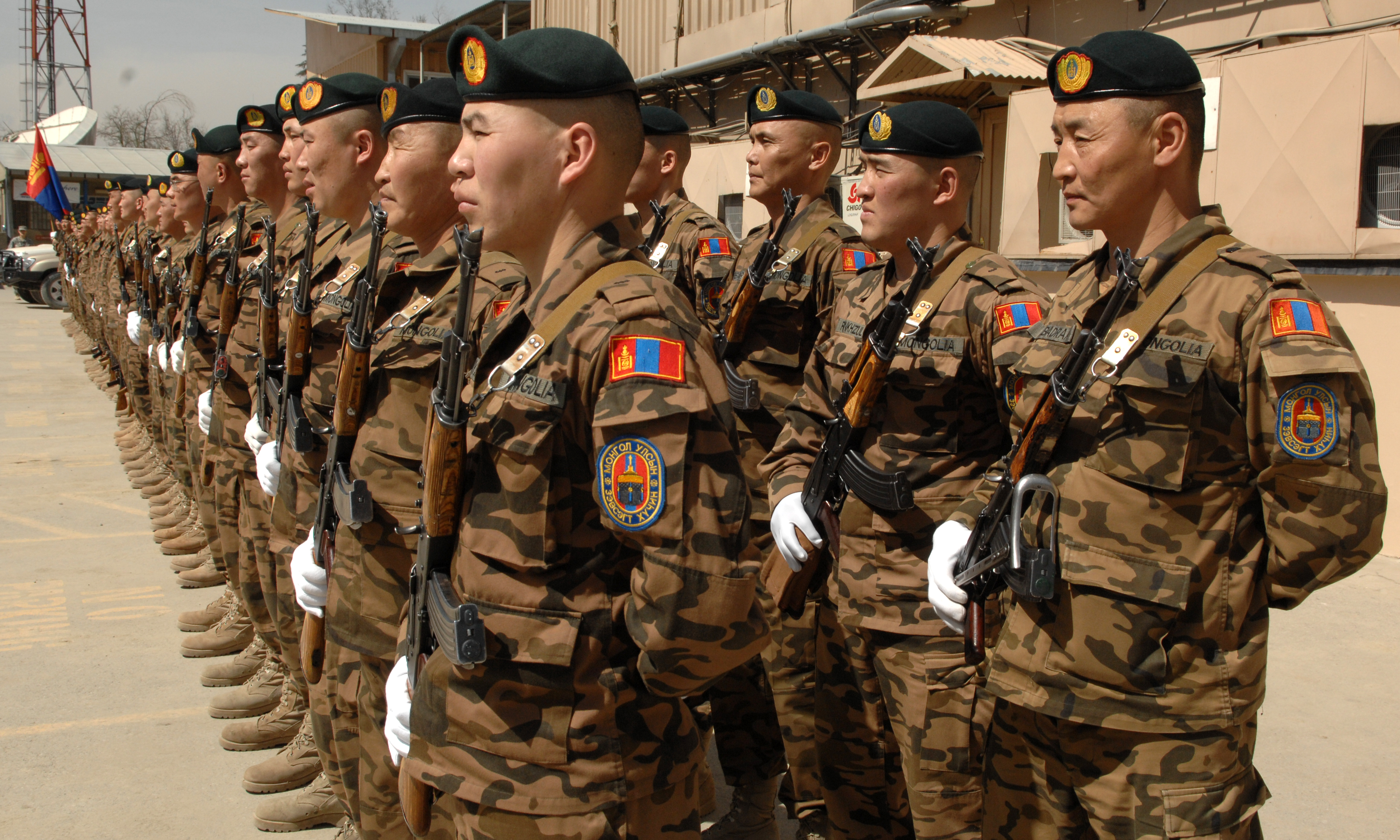
Members of the Mongolian Expeditionary Task Force 1 stand in formation for Mongolian Army Day at Camp Eggers, Afghanistan. Mongolian Army Day is an annual event that has occurred since 1921.

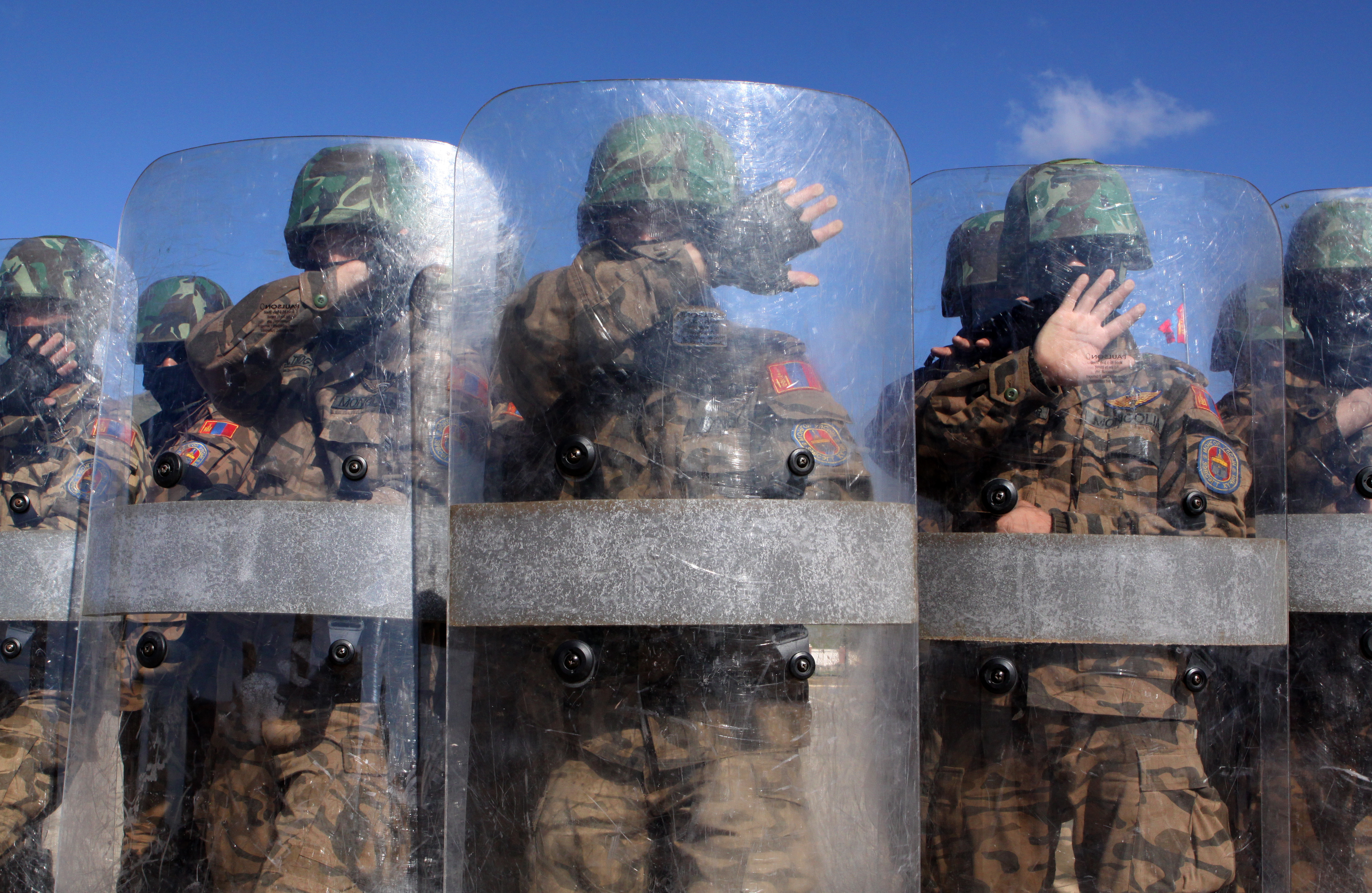
Members of the Mongolian Armed Forces and Internal Forces practice crowd control techniques as a part of Non-Lethal Weapons Executive Seminar 2010 at 5 Hills Training Facility, Mongolia, June 2010.

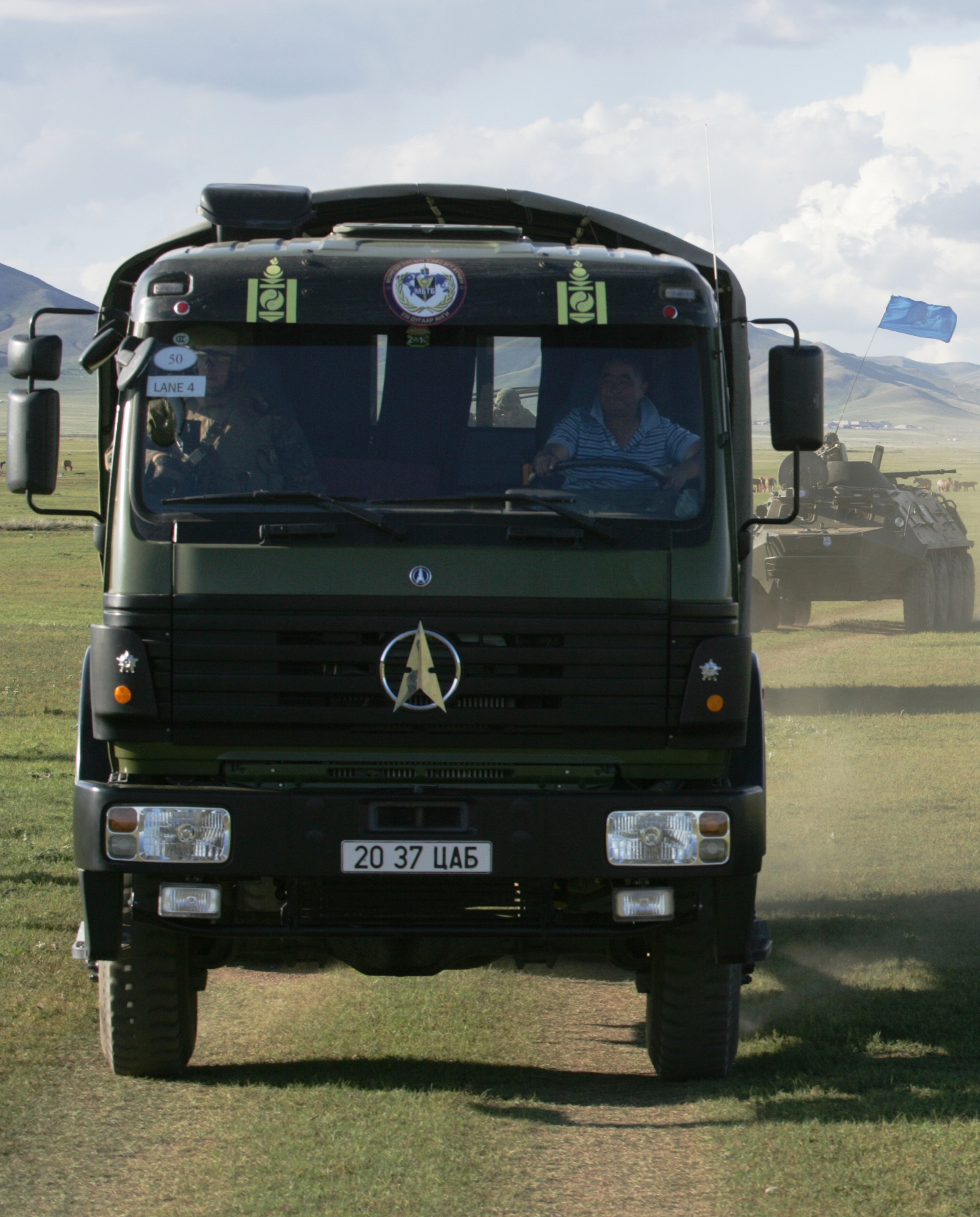
Mongolian Powerstar truck in Mongolian military service.

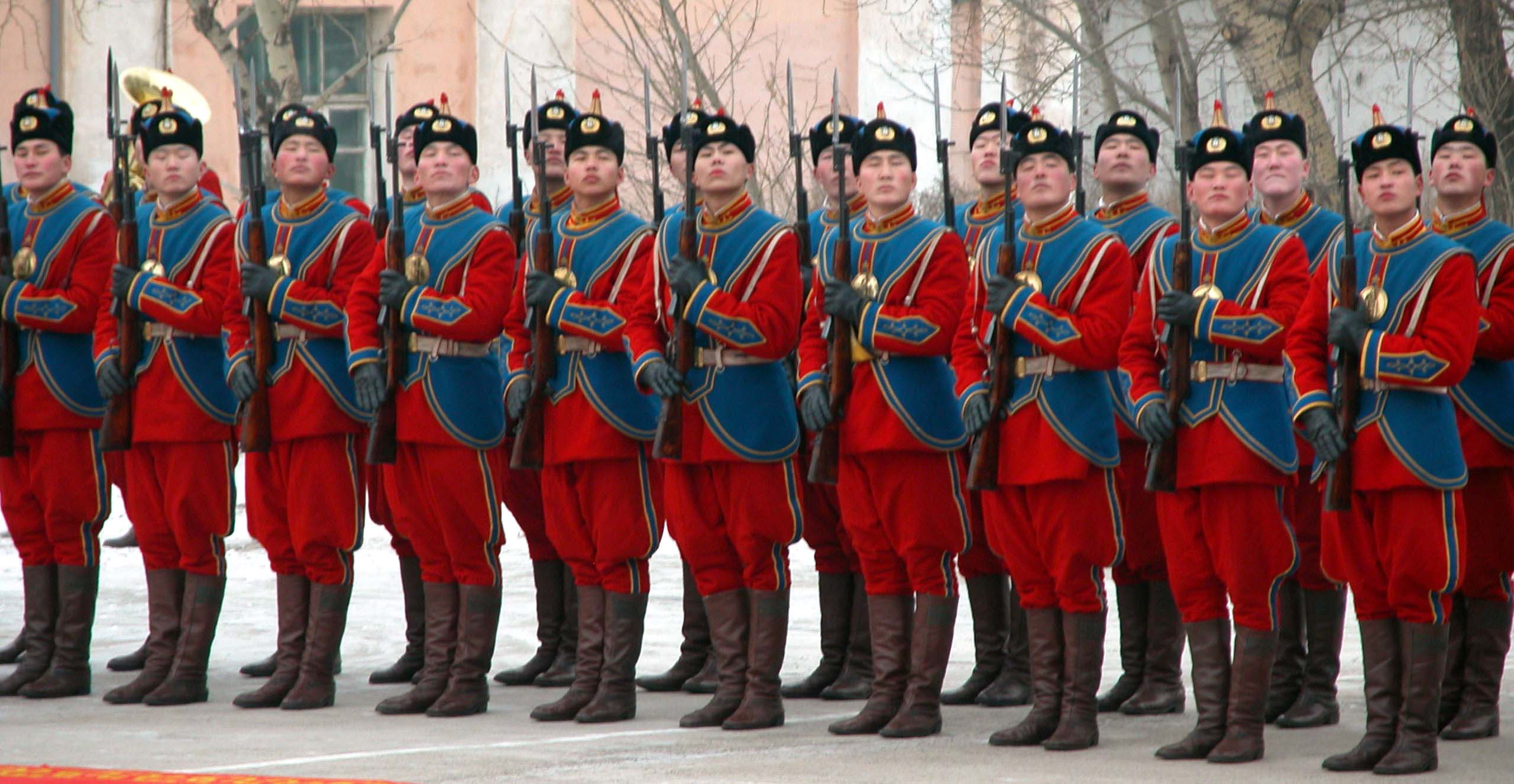
An honor guard salutes during the welcoming ceremonies for Air Force General Richard B. Myers, who became the first Chairman of the Joint Chiefs of Staff to visit Mongolia, January 2004.

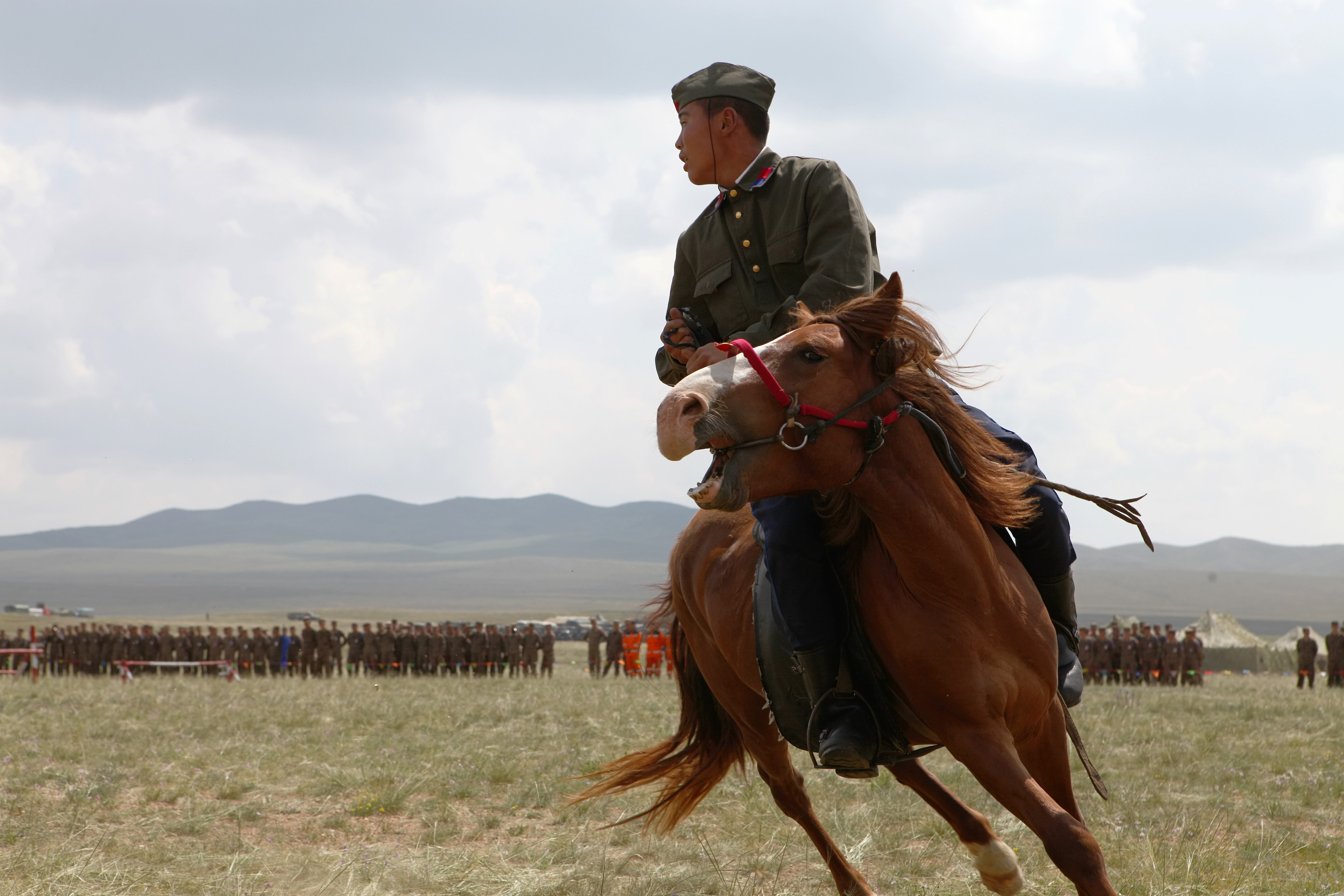
A Mongolian soldier performs during the opening ceremony for exercise Khaan Quest 2013 at the Five Hills Training Area in Mongolia, August 2013.
