= Construction and Engineering Forces =

Engineering branch of Mongolia's military

Construction and Engineering Force of the Mongolian Armed Forces
- Монгол Улсын Зэвсэгт хүчний Барилга-инженерийн цэрэг
- Emblem of the Construction and Engineering force
- Founded: 1927; 99 years ago (Sapper and engineering unit); 1936; 90 years ago (Construction unit); 2020; 6 years ago (current form)
- Country: Mongolia
- Type: Combat engineer
- Part of: Mongolian Armed Forces
- Garrison/HQ: Ulaanbaatar
- Anniversaries: 12 March (Construction troops Foundation Day); 19 August (Engineering troops Foundation day)
- Engagements: Battles of Khalkhin Gol; Battle of Baitag Bogd
- Website: www.gsmaf.gov.mn/bitsug

Commanders
- Chief of the Directorate office: Colonel Kh.Batsaikhan

Insignia
- Flag

The Construction and Engineering Forces (Mongolian: барилга-инженерийн цэрэг), also known as the Corps of Engineers, is a combat engineer branch of the Mongolian Armed Forces that specializes in military construction and civil works. They also construct defensive positions, serve as military engineers, sappers, and detect mines. They have played a leading role in Armed Forces peacekeeping missions and have successfully participated in UN peacekeeping operations and joint international training exercises.

== History ==
=== Imperial era ===
The origin and development of the engineering army dates back to the era of the Mongol Empire. Engineers in the Mongol Army utilized unconventional techniques to win battles against enemies. Genghis Khan frequently utilized Chinese and Muslim engineers during the Khwarezmian campaign and the Sieges of Fancheng and Xiangyang.

=== Communist era ===
At the end of 1927, the 1st Cavalry Corps was entrenched as the main fighting force of the Mongolian People's Revolutionary Party, and in 1928, the first “Breakdown and Repair Sapper Branch” was established. This was the first construction army to be established in the Mongolian People's Republic. In 1947, the Military Construction Command was established, with more than 10 units. At its peak, there were 23 military construction units, totaling around 20,000 soldiers and 56,000 officers. Beginning in 1963, large-scale construction work operated as a military affair under the responsibility of the Mongolian People's Army. On January 8, 1964, the Council of Ministers established the General Construction Military Agency under the Ministry of People's Military Affairs. A large number of construction military units were established over the course of the decades that followed. Prior to the 1990s, military construction units contributed 70-80 percent of the country's construction. Five construction units were involved in the construction of Erdenet, which was established in 1974. Construction units were also responsible for developing the cities of Choibalsan and Darkhan. Between 1970 and 1990, the construction army commissioned 300-500 facilities a year.

=== Modern era ===
Work to create a new construction and engineering army began in 2010, and throughout the decade, the Ministry of Defense and the General Staff established six civil engineering units in the 2010s. In October 2019, the Cabinet announced that it would make some amendments to the Law on the Armed Forces on the expansion of military construction and engineering units of the Armed Forces into an independent military branch. In April 2020, the Minister of Defense, Nyamaagiin Enkhbold submitted a draft law on amendments to the Law on Armed Forces to the Speaker of the State Great Khural, providing for the creation of a "Civil Engineering Army" in the armed forces.

== Units ==
- 339th Civil Engineering Unit (Bayankhongor Province)
- 014 Construction Unit

== See also ==
- United States Army Corps of Engineers
- Russian Engineer Troops
- Construction Troops (Bulgaria)
