= 014 Construction Unit =

Military unit in Mongolia

- Service members assigned to the Band of the 014 Construction Unit during the opening ceremony of Khaan Quest 2013.
- Active: 1944; 81 years ago
- Country: Mongolia
- Branch: Armed Forces of Mongolia
- Type: Combat engineer
- Role: Military engineering
- Garrison/HQ: Ulaanbaatar

The 014 Construction Unit (Mongolian: Зэвсэгт хүчний барилгын 014-р анги) is a one of three combat engineer unit of the Mongolian Ground Force.

== History ==
It was established in 1944. The unit fought during World War Two and took part in the Soviet invasion of Manchuria in 1945. It was also part of the Fourth Cavalry Committee serving on the western border of Mongolia in 1947. It successfully participated in joint field exercises orchestrated by the Mongolian People's Army (examples including Kherlen-73 and Govi-77) as well as joint Mongolian-Soviet exercises in 1973 and 1977. It fulfilled the Army Leader Class status for units for seven consecutive years from 1973 to 1980. In 2017, the unit was awarded the Order of the Red Banner of Merit.

== Activities ==
It takes part in peace-building construction in Ulaanbaatar and serves as a war-time construction unit. It has taken part in projects such as the building of factories, power plants, a student office, and a 72-room apartment for officers. As part of the work on upgrading the local infrastructure to more than 1,000 kilometres (620 mi) in the area, the unit was called in for repairs to the local roads.

Like, many military units, it maintains a military band that serves as a public relations tool.

== See also ==
- United States Army Corps of Engineers
- Canadian Military Engineers
- Madras Engineer Group
- Royal Engineers
