= Bolor Ganbold =

Mongolian general (born 1976)

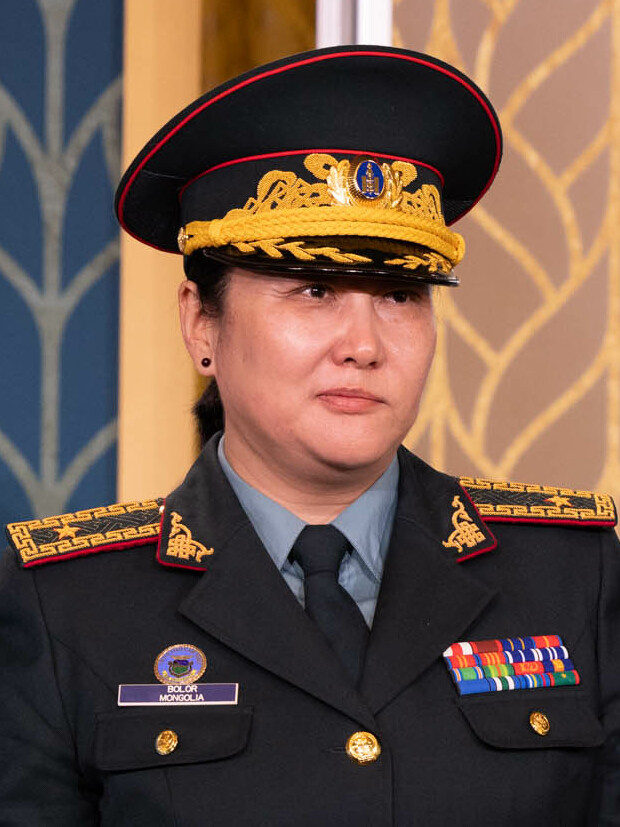
- Bolor in 2023
- Native name: Ганболд Болор
- Born: 1976 (age 49–50); Ulaanbaatar, Mongolian People's Republic
- Branch: Mongolian Armed Forces
- Service years: 1994–present
- Rank: Brigadier general
- Awards: International Women of Courage Award

Bolor Ganbold (Mongolian: Ганболд Болор; born 1976) is a Mongolian general. One of the first female recruits into the Mongolian Armed Forces, in 2022 she became the first woman in Mongolian history to be conferred the rank of brigadier general.

== Early life and training ==
Bolor was raised in Ulaanbaatar, where she graduated from High School No. 33 in 1994. She was a member of the first cohort of female recruits admitted into the Military University of Mongolia (now the National Defence University), shortly after it began to accept women in 1994. Bolor graduated from the institution in 1999.

Bolor also trained at the Air Command and Staff College in Montgomery, Alabama, United States, between 2010 and 2011.

== Military career ==
Following her graduation in 1999, Bolor worked as an electrical engineer within the Mongolian Armed Forces. Between 2003 and 2007, she worked as a teacher of new recruits, and between 2007 and 2010 was the head of the Foreign Language Training Centre.

In 2010 Bolor was deployed as part of the United Nations Mission in the Central African Republic and Chad, the first female Mongolian peacekeeper to serve as part of that mission. In 2013, she served in a leadership role within the United Nations Mission in South Sudan. Following her deployments, Bolor served as a Peacekeeping Affairs Officer within the United Nations Peacekeeping service, based in New York City City, between 2015 and 2017.

On 18 March 2022, as part of Mongolian military day, Bolor was conferred the rank of brigadier general by the President of Mongolia, Ukhnaagiin Khürelsükh. Bolor was the first female to attain the title, which is the highest rank within the Mongolian military.

As of 2022 Bolor is the head of the Military Training and education Department of the Mongolian Armed Forces.

== Recognition ==
In March 2023 Bolor was one of the recipients of that year's International Women of Courage Awards. She was honoured by US Secretary of State Antony Blinken and US First Lady Jill Biden. Following this, Bolor took part in the International Visitor Leadership Program.
