= 150th Peacekeeping Battalion =

Military unit in Mongolia

- Active: 1997; 29 years ago
- Country: Mongolia
- Branch: Mongolian Ground Force
- Type: Light infantry
- Role: Peacekeeping
- Part of: Peacekeeping Operations Office (PKOO), General Staff of the Mongolian Armed Forces
- Garrison/HQ: Ulaanbaatar

The 150th Peacekeeping Battalion (Mongolian: Зэвсэгт хүчний 150 дүгээр анги) is one of three peacekeeping light infantry battalions of the Mongolian Ground Force, which specializes in peacekeeping. It was the first unit that was designated for peace-support operations. Operationally, it reports to the Peacekeeping Operations Office (PKOO) of the General Staff of the Mongolian Armed Forces, being deployed in the city of Ulaanbaatar.

== History ==
In 1997, the Mongolian Armed Forces established the battalion as primarily a combat unit. By order of President Natsagiin Bagabandi however, its duties changed in preparation for peacekeeping missions. Later, the battalion started conducting peacekeeping operations training in September 2000, one platoon from the battalion participated in CENTRAZBAT 2000 in Kazakhstan, the country's first ever multinational peacekeeping field exercise. It also took part in the multinational peacekeeping exercise SHANTEE-DOOT in Bangladesh in 2002.

In 2010, it was trained by US Marines and the Alaska National Guard. It has taken part in the Khaan Quest exercise.

== Operations ==
=== Iraq ===
In early 2004, the then-Chairman of the Joint Chiefs of Staff of the United States, General Richard Myers, visited Mongolia and expressed his appreciation for the deployment of a 173-strong contingent from the battalion to Iraq, which was planned to send a fresh force to replace the first contingent later in January 2004.

All troops were withdrawn on September 25, 2008.

=== Africa ===
On November 17, 2009, Deputy Assistant Secretary of Defense James Schear had lunch with troops from the battalion bound for Chad on November 20, 2009.

== See also ==
- 15th Separate Motor Rifle Brigade
- KAZBAT
