= Mongolian military day =

Mongolian holiday

Mongolian military Day Монгол цэргийн өдөр
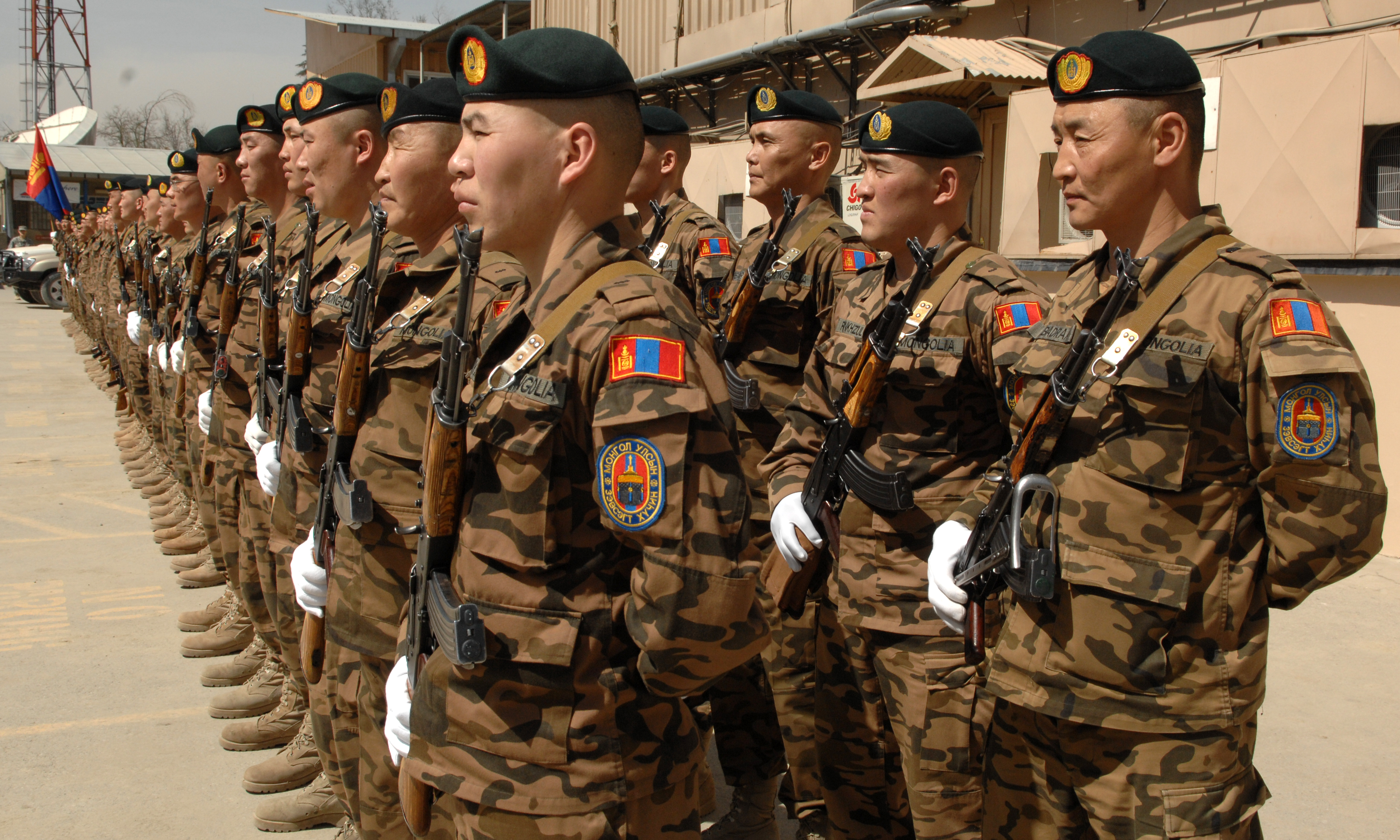
- Members of the Mongolian Expeditionary Task Force stand in formation during the Soldiers Day celebrations in Camp Eggers, Afghanistan.
- Also called: Army Day (Армийн өдөр); Soldiers Day (Цэргийн баяр)
- Observed by: Mongolia
- Type: State
- Significance: Celebrated the founding anniversary of the Mongolian People's Army
- Celebrations: Military ceremonies and events
- Date: 18 March
- Next time: 18 March 2026
- Frequency: annual

Mongolian military Day (Mongolian: Монгол цэргийн өдөр) is a public celebration day in Mongolia is celebrated on 18 March annually. Being the official holiday of the Mongolian Armed Forces, it is the equivalent of Defender of the Fatherland Day in Russia and/or the male version of International Women's Day.

== Background ==
In March 1279, The Battle of Yamen was the final battle of the Mongol Empire led by Kublai Khan completion of conquered Song Dynasty of China. In March 1921, during the early stages of the Mongolian Revolution of 1921, a Mongolian guerrilla army led by Damdin Sükhbaatar as Supreme Commander launched an offensive at the Chinese garrison at Kyakhta Maimaicheng (Altanbulag, Selenge). The offensive followed a failed attempt by the Mongolian People's Party central committee to reach an ultimatum with Chinese troops. Despite Sükhbaatar's 400-man army being heavily outnumbered by the Chinese, he led his troops to victory in taking the town. This event is considered to be the date that gave birth to the modern Mongolian Armed Forces and the preceding Mongolian People's Army.

== Celebrations ==
The holiday is celebrated in many different ways as it is both a civilian and military holiday. The military side usually conducts promotion and award ceremonies. The Chief of General Staff usually takes part in a wreath laying ceremony on Sükhbaatar Square. The President of Mongolia in his/her position as commander-in-chief usually sends greetings on the holiday, often visiting the country's National Defense University. Military tattoos are held in the capital of Ulaanbaatar as well as gala concerts.

The 100th anniversary of the armed forces was celebrated in 2021.
