= Khaan Quest =

Multinational military exercise in Mongolia

- Headquarters: Altanbulag, Töv, Mongolia
- Type: Military exercises

Establishment
  - First established: 2003
  - As multinational event: 2006

Khaan Quest (Mongolian: Хааны эрэлд) is an annual military exercise held in Mongolia for a week in the summer. It brings together over a dozen foreign militaries to engage in the sharing of practices for multinational peacekeeping operations. In the exercise, personnel gain United Nations peacekeeper training as well as certification for support of peacekeeping operations. According to Mongolian Armed Forces Chief of Staff, Lieutenant General Tserendejidiin Byambajav (2014), "Khaan Quest has become one of the signature training events for the participating nations and one of the biggest peacekeeping exercise in the world."

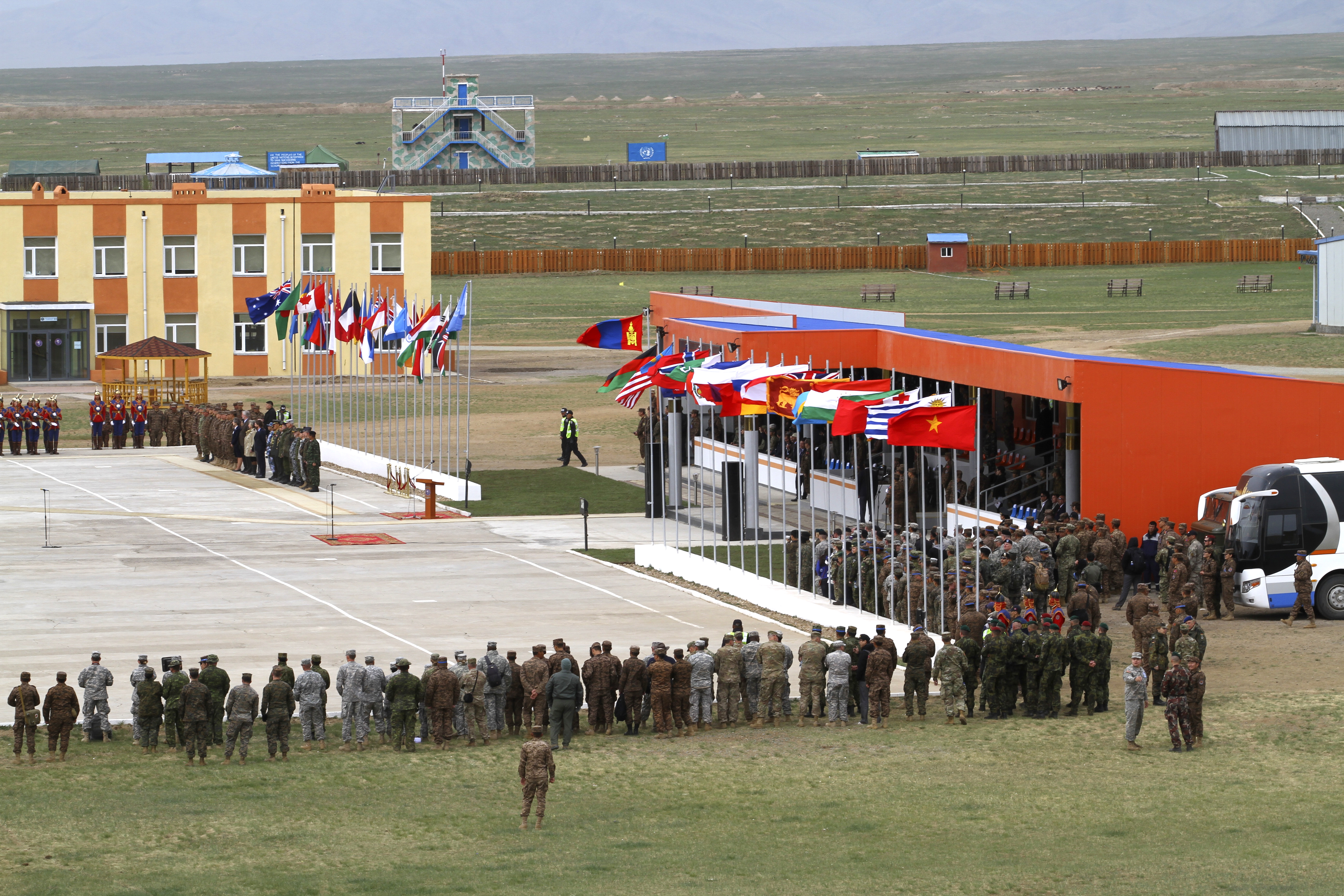
Multinational soldiers during the opening ceremony of Khaan Quest 2016

Since its establishment in 2003, it has been held in the Five Hills Training Area, located in Altanbulag, Töv, 50.8 kilometres southwest from Ulaanbaatar, the capital of Mongolia. It only became an international exercise in 2006, originally being a bilateral exercise between the Mongolian Armed Forces and the United States Indo-Pacific Command. This annual exercise has usually convened with an opening ceremony by the President of Mongolia or the Minister of Defense.

Khaan Quest exercise consists of three major training events—Command Post Exercise, Field Training Exercise, and Critical Capability Enhancement Training.

Mongolia contributes to global peace and security by deploying its military personnel to United Nations (UN) peacekeeping operations and providing training opportunities for peacekeepers from around the world. The Khaan Quest multinational peacekeeping exercise has become one of the key platforms through which the Mongolian Armed Forces contribute to international peacekeeping training and capacity-building.

Since its inception in 2006, Khaan Quest has brought together more than 21,000 military personnel from 75 countries, making it a significant international platform for enhancing interoperability, strengthening military cooperation, and improving the collective capabilities of peacekeeping forces.

Colonel D. Myagmarjav, Chief of the Peace Support Operations and Military Cooperation Department of the General Staff of the Mongolian Armed Forces, served as Mongolia’s Exercise Director for Khaan Quest in both 2025 and 2026. In June 2026, it celebrated 20th anniversary of the exercise that became multilateral training event. Also since 2026, Mazaalai, the Gobi bear, has served as the official mascot of the “Khaan Quest” exercise. Native to Mongolia’s Gobi Desert, the Mazaalai is one of the world’s rarest bear species and a powerful symbol of resilience, endurance, and peace.

== Participants ==
The following nations are regular annual participants, frequently deploying active combat troops and command personnel to the drills:

- Australia
- Canada
- China
- France
- Germany
- India
- Indonesia
- Italy
- Japan
- Malaysia
- Mongolia (host)
- Nepal
- New Zealand
- Pakistan
- Philippines
- Qatar
- Singapore
- South Korea
- Thailand
- Timor-Leste
- Turkey
- United Kingdom
- United States
- Vietnam
- Egypt

A wider range of global militaries have sent personnel or medical delegations to past iterations:

List
- Bangladesh
- Benin
- Bhutan
- Croatia
- Czechia
- Egypt
- El Salvador
- Fiji
- Hungary
- Israel
- Jordan
- Kuwait
- Moldova
- Peru
- Rwanda
- Saudi Arabia
- Togo
- Uruguay
- Zambia

== Gallery ==
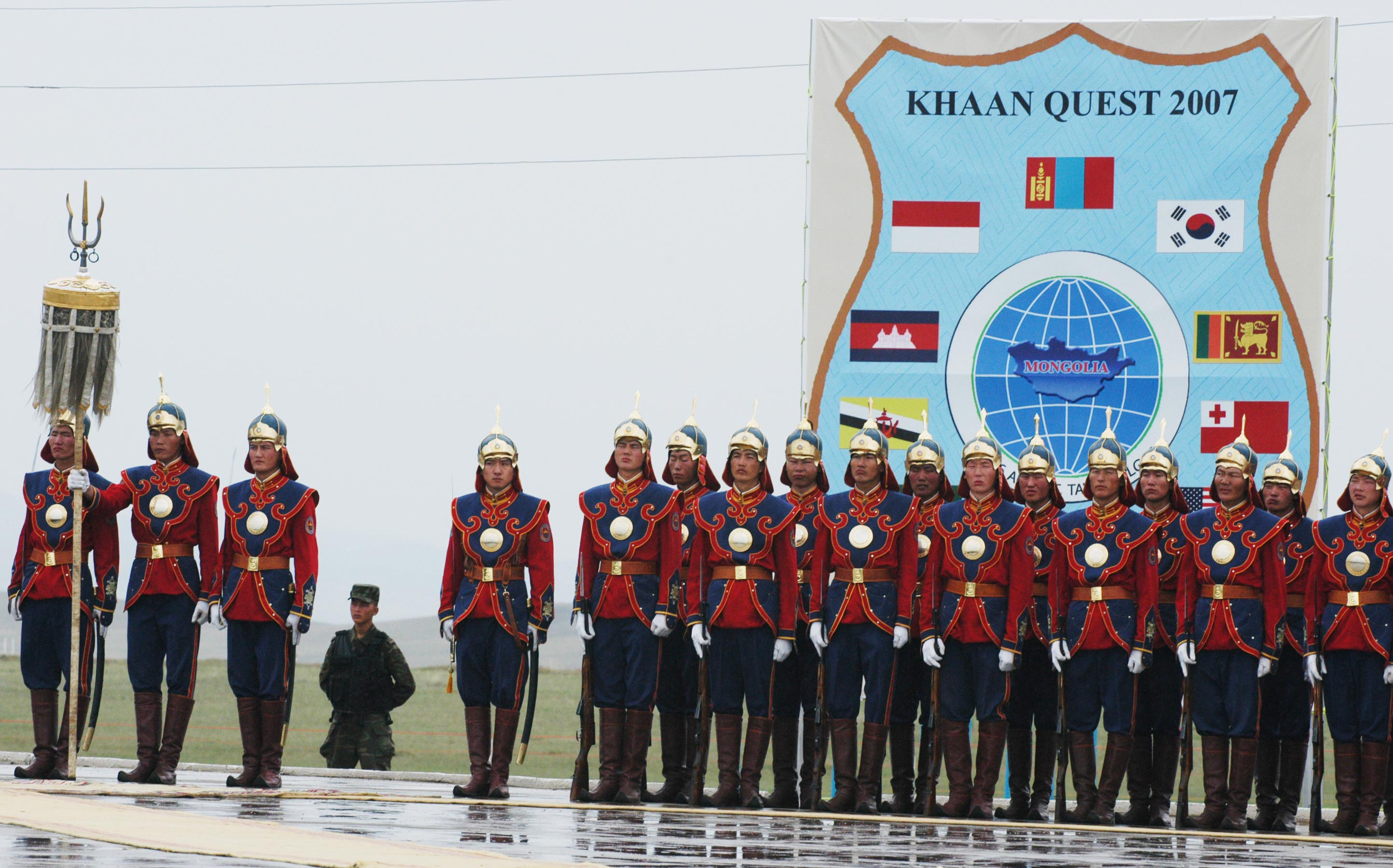
The Mongolian State Honor Guard at the opening ceremony of Khaan Quest 2007

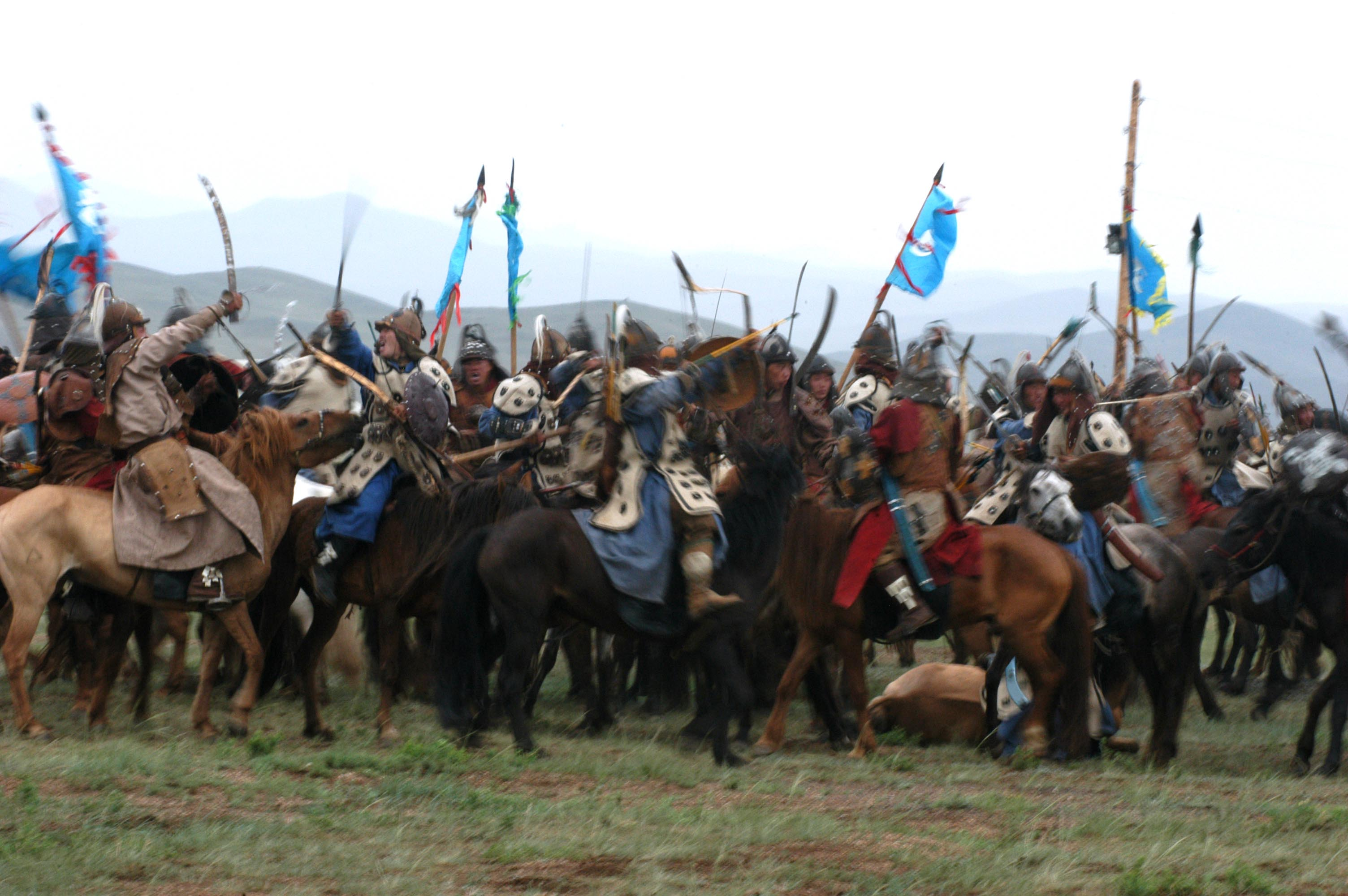
A mock Mongol Empire-era battle conducted by the Mongolian Ground Force during Khaan Quest 2007

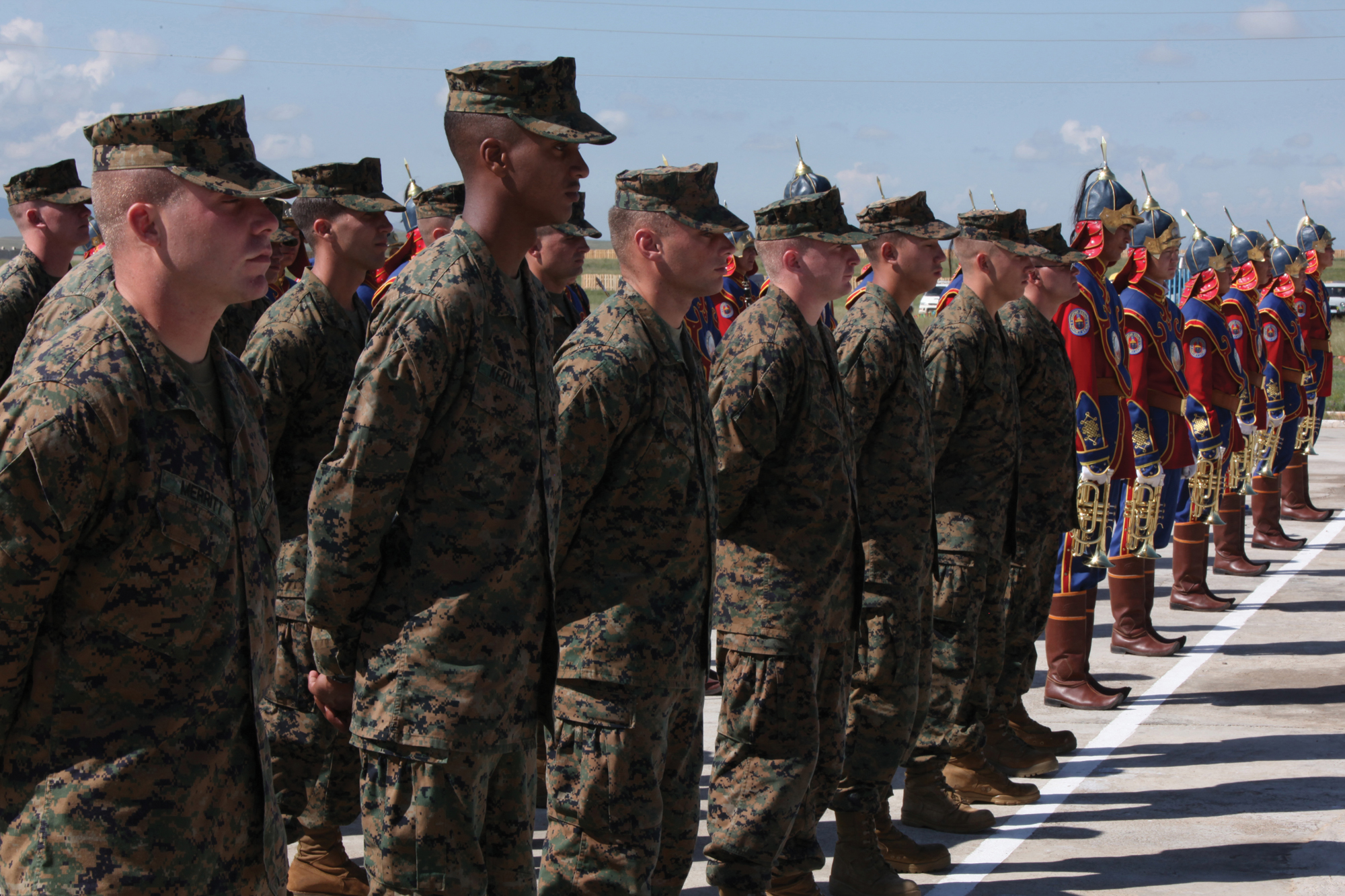
U.S. Marines standing in formation next to the Military Band of the General Staff during the opening ceremony of Khaan Quest 2012

Mongolian, Indian, Canadian, South Korean, and American combat medics during Khaan Quest 2013

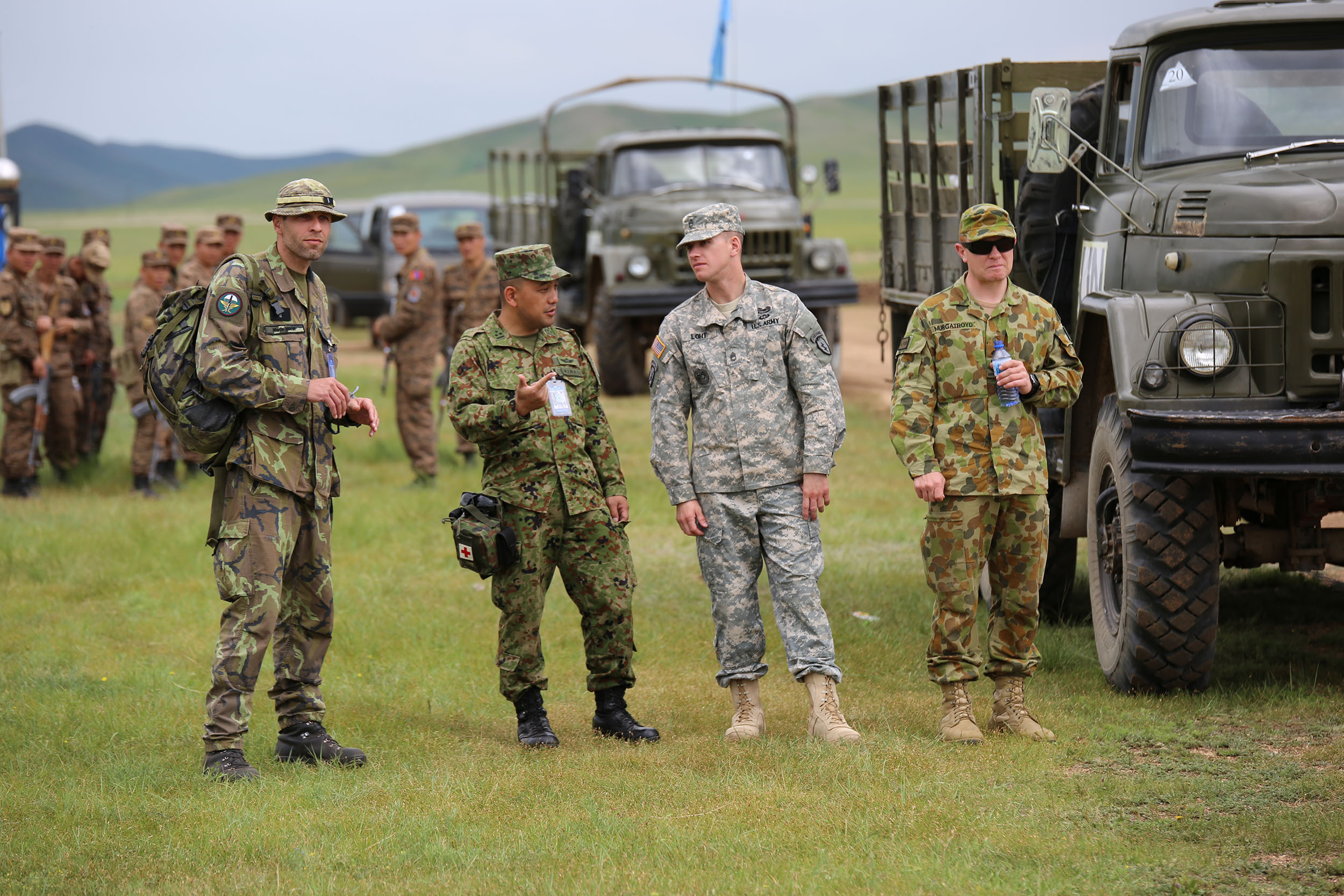
Czech, Japanese, American, and Australian soldiers before a convoy during Khaan Quest 2013

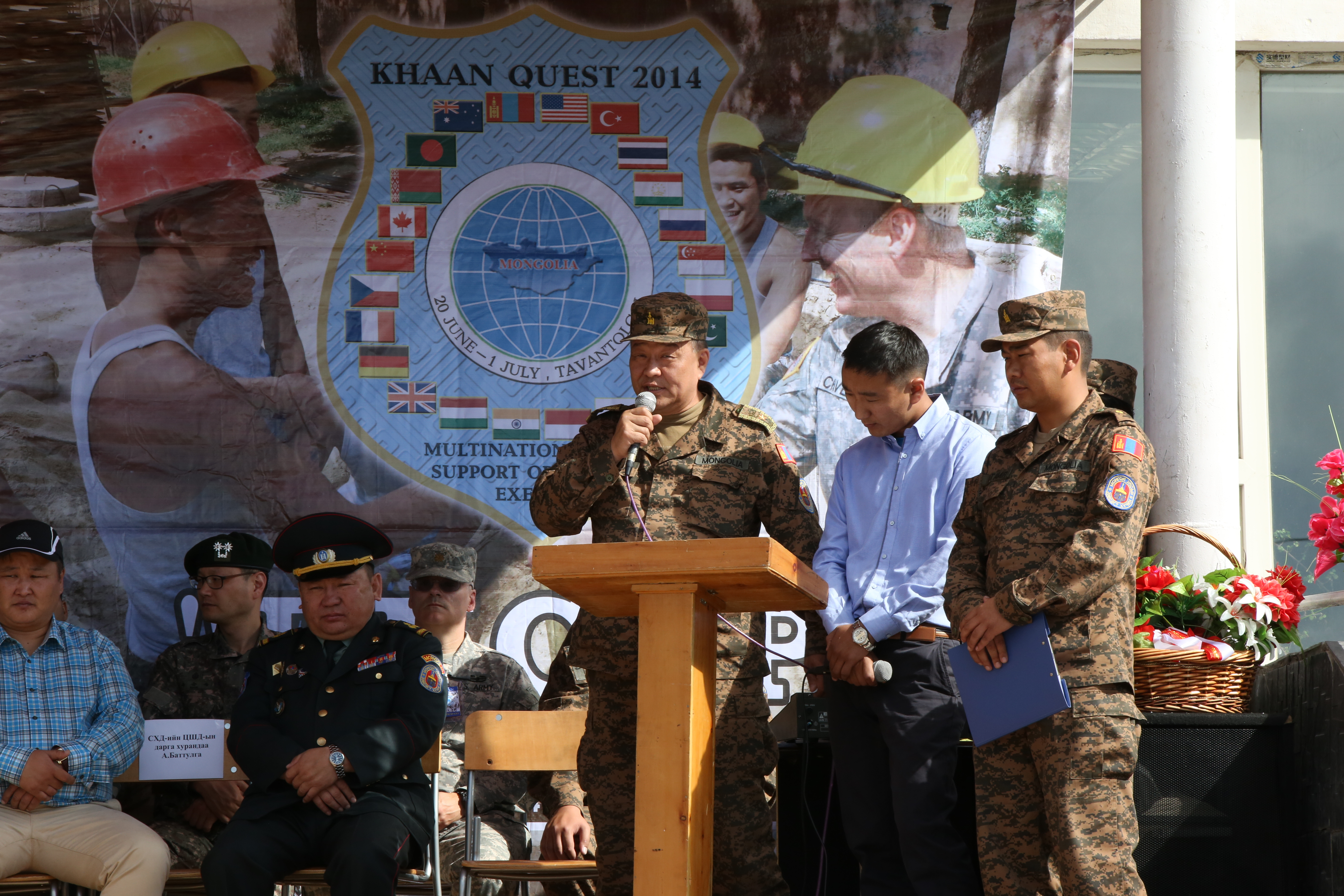
Lieutenant General Dulamsürengiin Davaa speaking at an elementary school in the Songino Khairkhan during Khaan Quest 2014

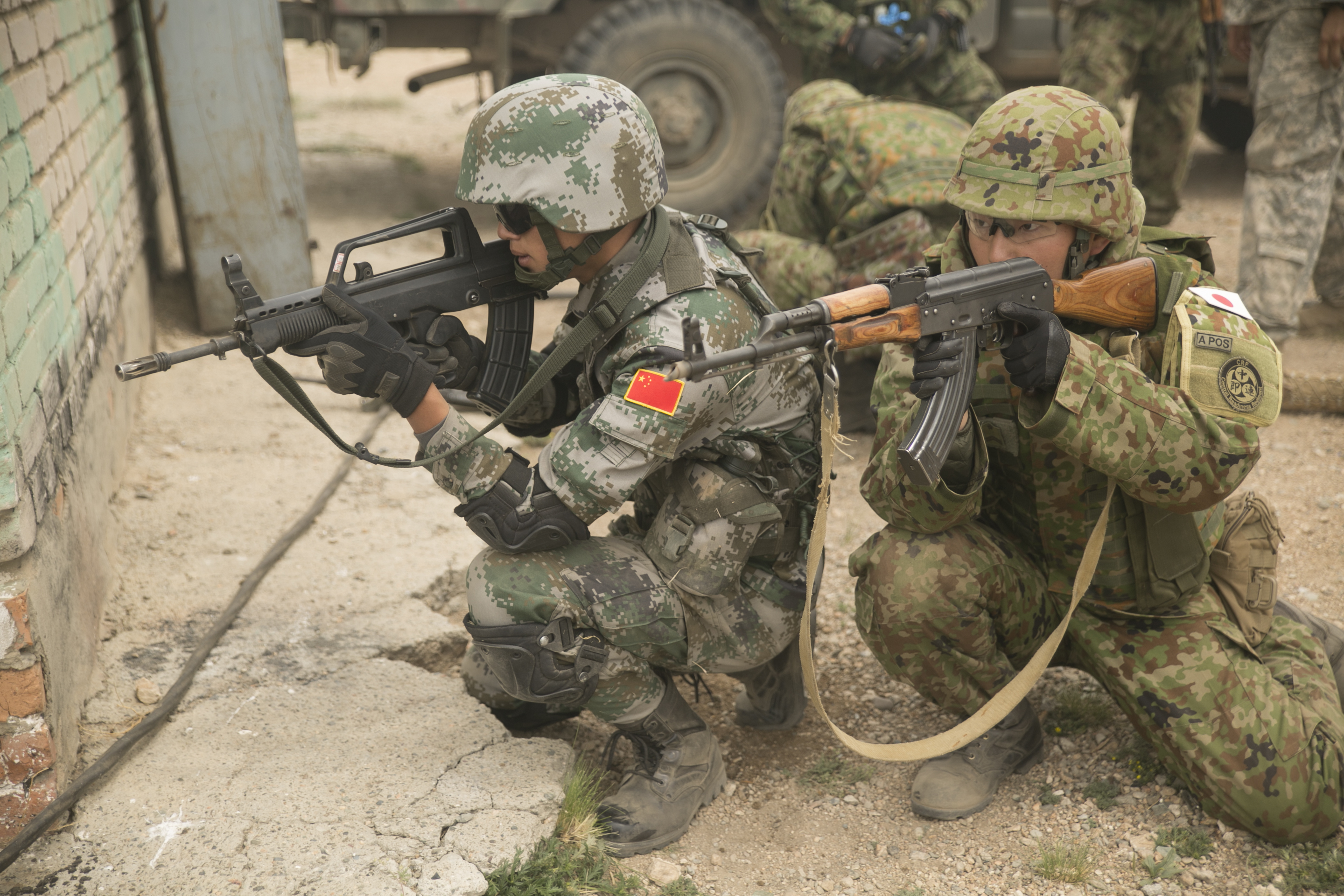
People's Liberation Army and Japan Ground Self-Defense Force soldiers during Khaan Quest 2015

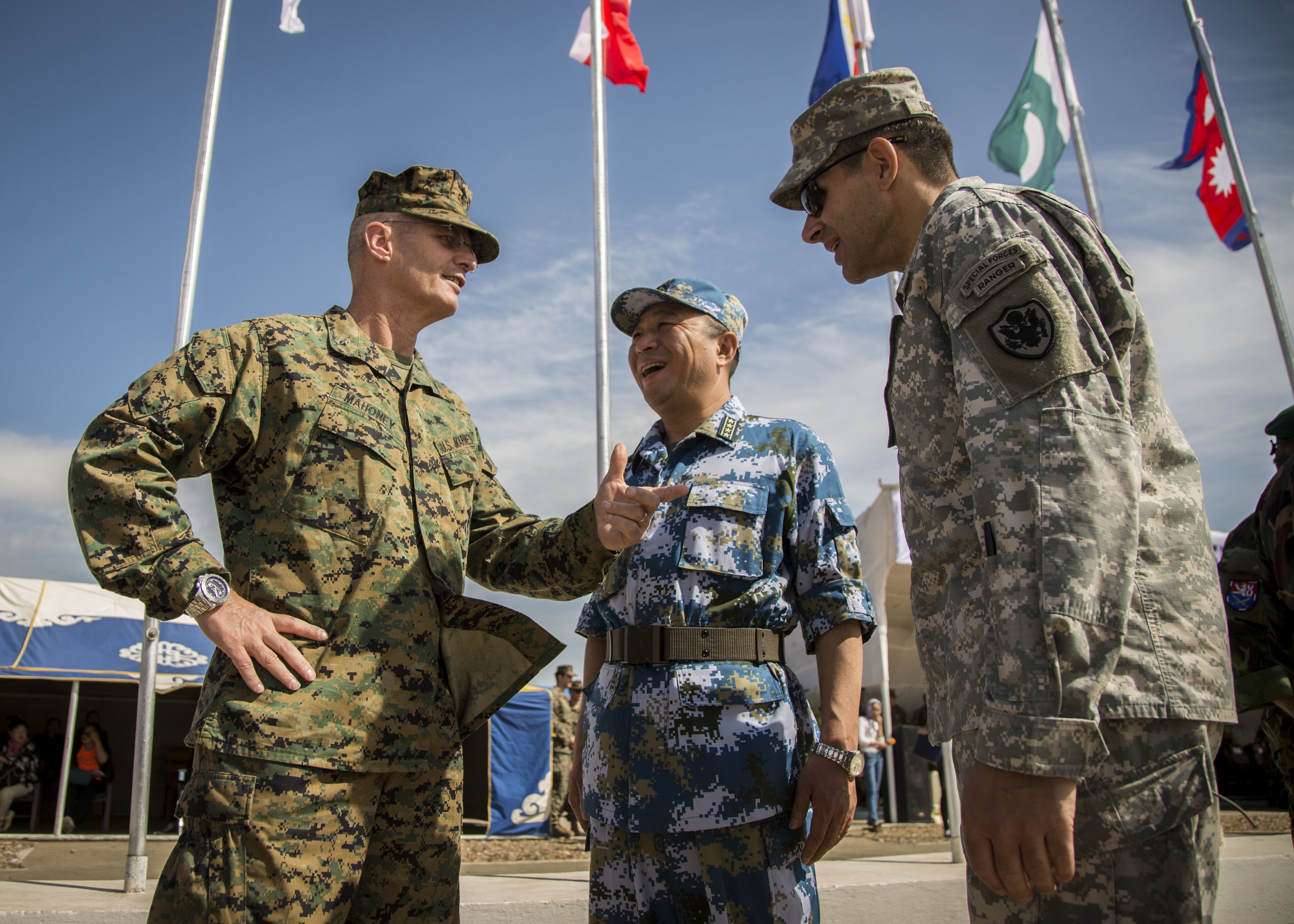
U.S. Army and Marine Corps officials conversing with a People's Liberation Army senior colonel during Khaan Quest 2015

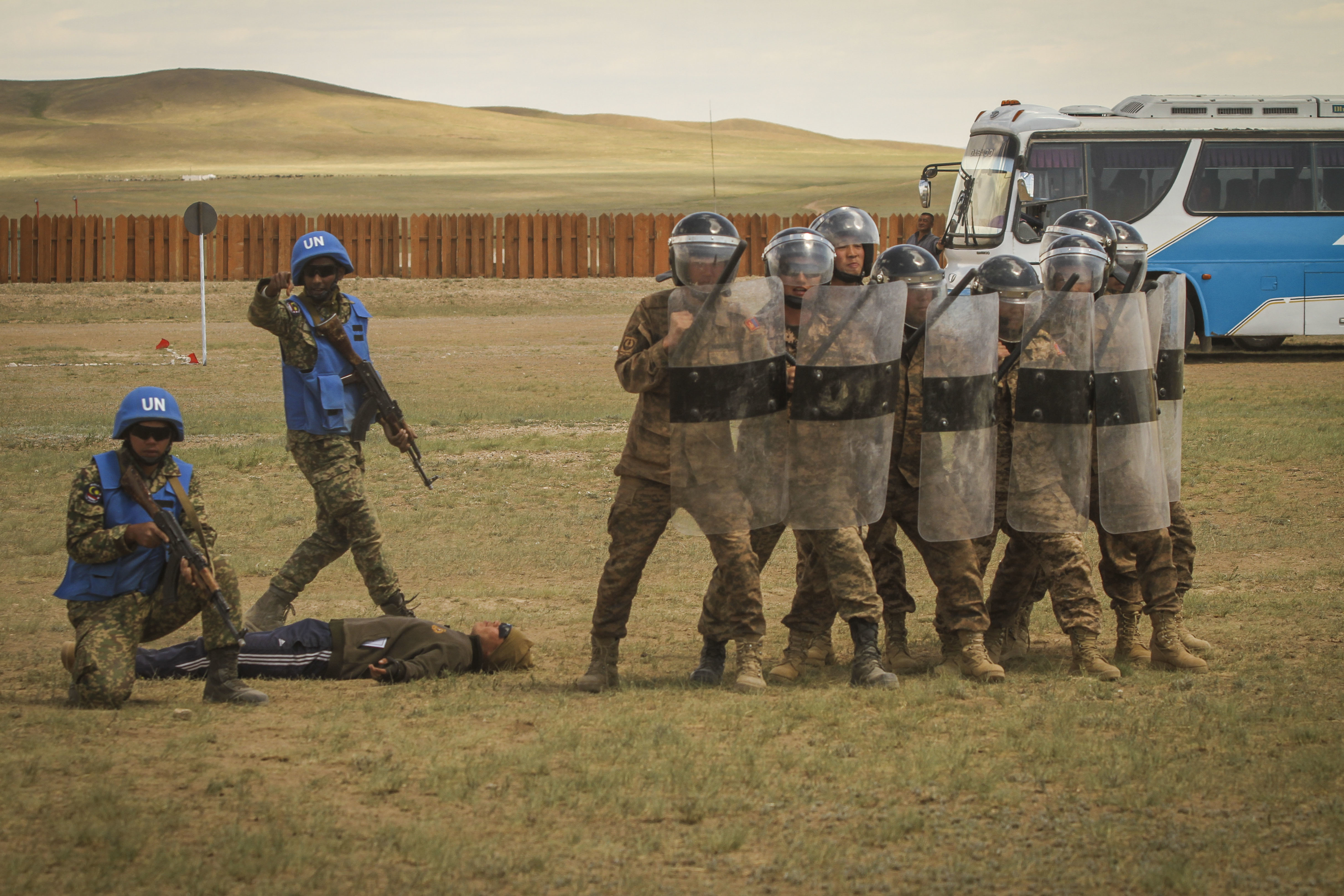
Malaysian UN peacekeepers protected by Mongolian soldiers while treating a simulated casualty in a riot control exercise during Khaan Quest 2016

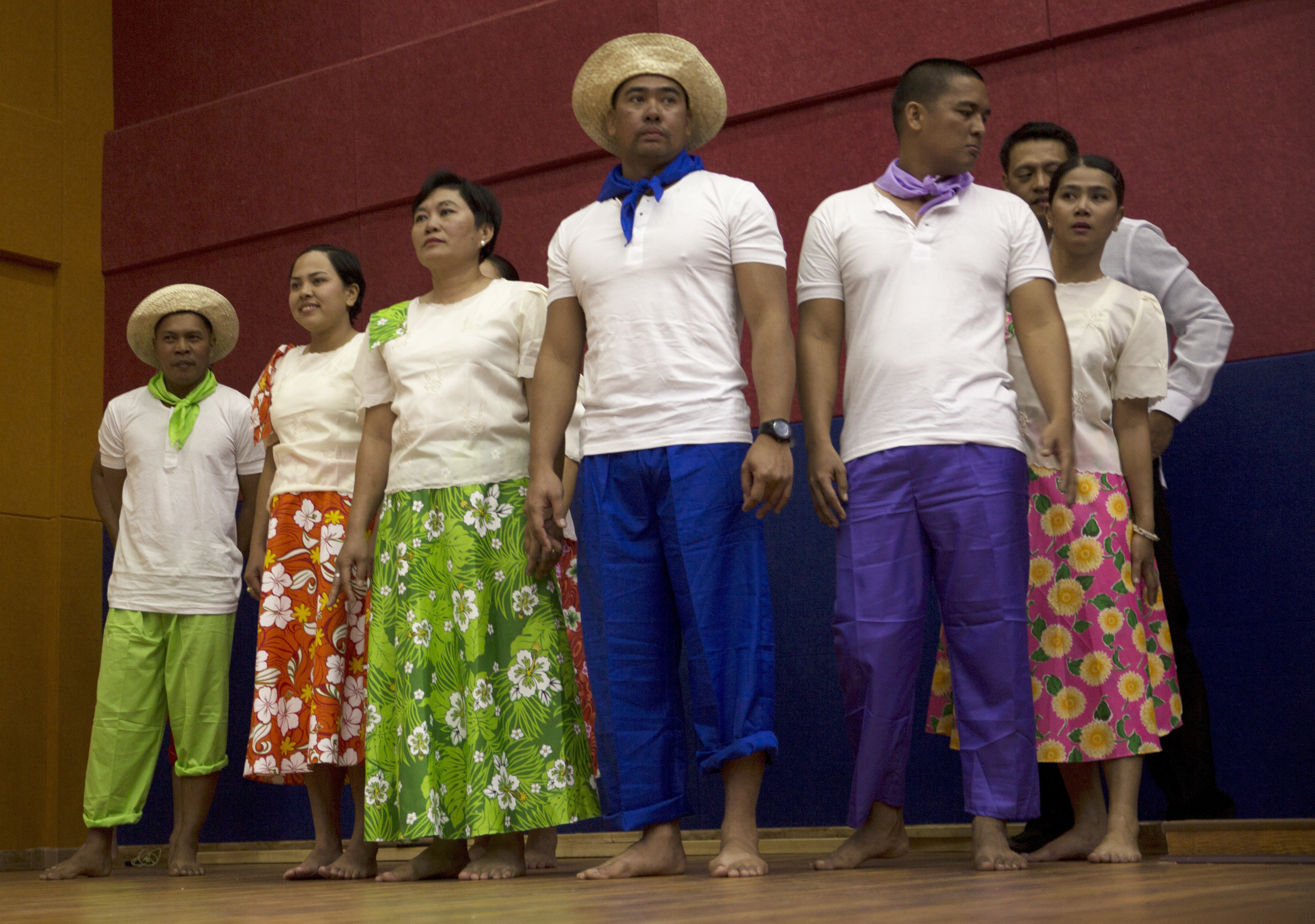
Armed Forces of the Philippines members in a cultural exchange event during Khaan Quest 2016

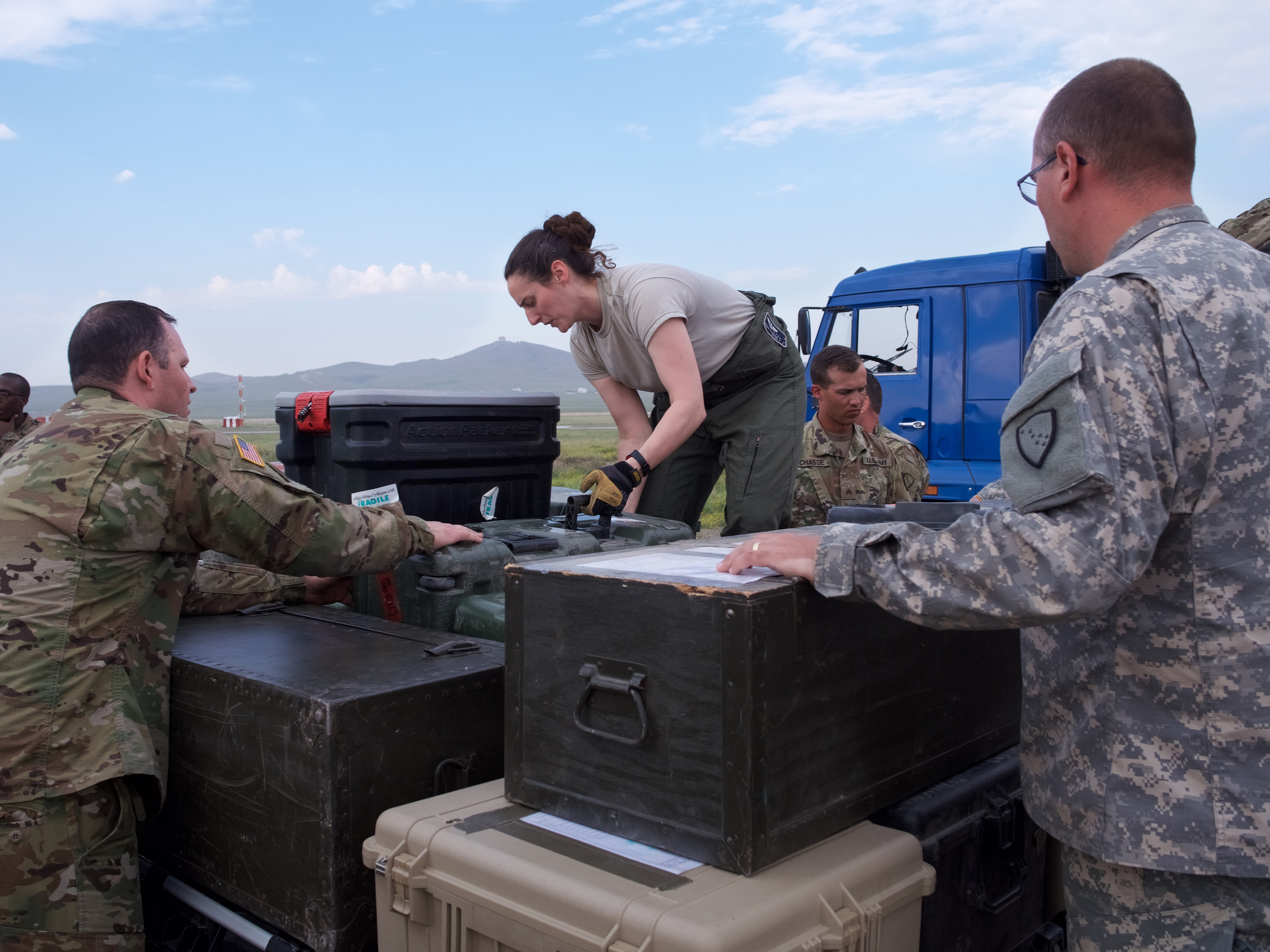
Alaska Air National Guard members loading cargo pallets at Chinggis Khaan International Airport during Khaan Quest 2018

== See also ==
- Super Garuda Shield
- Vostok 2018
