= 084th Special Task Battalion =

Military unit in Mongolia

- Active: 1965; 61 years ago
- Country: Mongolia
- Branch: Mongolian Ground Force
- Type: Special forces
- Garrison/HQ: Ulaanbaatar

Commanders
- Current commander: Colonel Batdelger Khash-Erdene

The 084th Special Task Battalion (Mongolian: Зэвсэгт хүчний 084-р анги), named after former Minister of Defense Lieutenant General Shagalyn Jadambaa and also known as the Parachute Special Forces Battalion is a special forces unit of the Mongolian Ground Force.

Operatively, it reports to the Chief of General Staff of the Mongolian Armed Forces, being deployed in the city of Ulaanbaatar.

== History ==
It was established in 1965 as an "Army Intelligence Company". It has met the requirements for the title of "Excellent Unit" three times and "Leading Unit" seventeen times. The battalion took part in the invasion of Iraq by coalition forces in 2003, where it was under the operational control of the Polish contingent. Previously, the unit's fighters guarded the Camp Marmal of the Bundeswehr in the Afghan province of Kunduz. More than 1,000 personnel of the unit have served in international peacekeeping operations in Iraq, Sierra Leone, Afghanistan, Kosovo, Chad, Sudan and South Sudan.

On 10 May 2016, the unit was awarded with the Order of Military Merit by the Head of the Office of the President P. Tsagaan and Defence Minister Tserendashiin Tsolmon.

== Training ==
Many members of the unit have been trained by the United States Army (specifically the 1st Special Forces Group). It has also taken part in joint exercises with the Indian Punjab Regiment.

In August 2018, it took part in the National Parachuting Championship in Nalaikh, where it took the second place prize. Previously in 2016, it took the first place prize at the traditional "Mongolian Military Progress" on Chinggis Square.

== Public activities ==
During the 2020 Moscow Victory Day Parade, the commander of the unit Colonel Batdelger Hasherdene led the combined Mongolian contingent on Red Square. Members of the unit also took part in a Victory Day Parade the following year in Buryatia.
