= Camp Eggers =

US military base in Kabul, Afghanistan

Coordinates: 34°31′50″N 69°10′47″E

- Kabul in Afghanistan
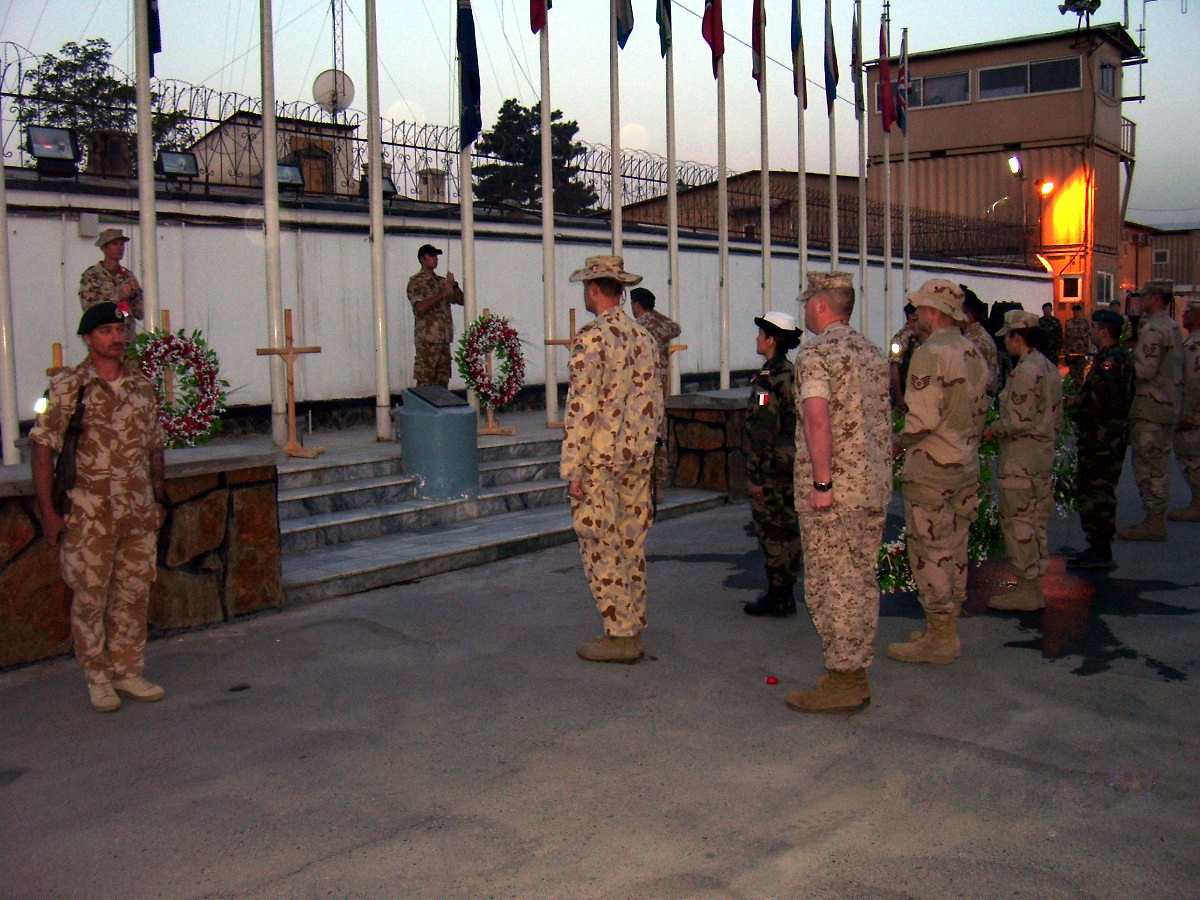
- Camp Eggers on Anzac Day in 2007

Site information
- Owner: Afghan Armed Forces; United States Armed Forces

Site history
- Built: 2004
- In use: 2004–2015

Camp Eggers was a United States military base in Kabul, Afghanistan, located near the US Embassy and the Afghan Presidential Palace. The camp was named after Captain Daniel W. Eggers, a US soldier from the 1st Battalion, 3rd Special Forces Group (Airborne), Fort Bragg, North Carolina, who was killed by an improvised explosive device (IED) along with three other soldiers on 29 May 2004 near Kandahar. Camp Eggers closed in 2015 as a part of the partial withdrawal of U.S. troops from Afghanistan (2011–2016).

== Overview ==
Camp Eggers was home to the Combined Forces Command - Afghanistan (CFC-A) and the Combined Security Transition Command - Afghanistan (CSTC-A). It was used by all U.S. military branches and the International Security Assistance Force (ISAF).

== Noted personnel ==
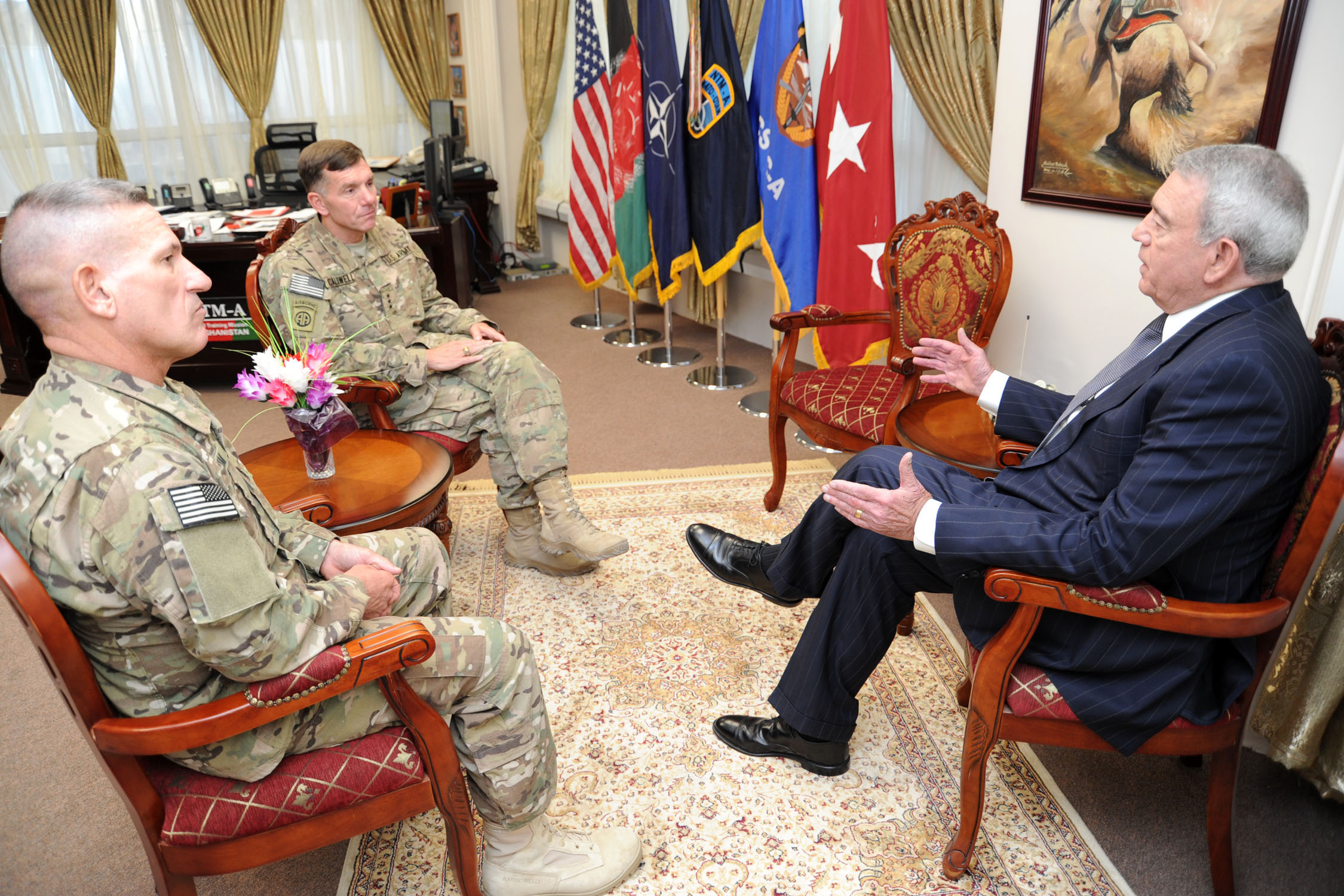
Dan Rather speaking with Lt. Gen. William B. Caldwell IV and Sergeant Maj. Ralph R. Beam about the Afghan National Security Forces (ANSF) training mission and other issues at Camp Eggers in Kabul, Afghanistan, in 2011

- Lt. Gen David Barno, first Commander of Combined Forces Command-Afghanistan
