= Battle of Baitag Bogd =

1946 border clashes between Republic of China and Mongolia

- Part of the Ili Rebellion and Chinese Civil War
Date	1946–1948
Location	Baitag Bogd, Xinjiang Province, China (on the Chinese–Mongolian border) 45.2°N 90.9°E
Result	Status quo ante bellum

Belligerents
China	Mongolia; Soviet Union

Commanders and leaders
(Republic of China (1912–1949)) Chiang Kai-shek; (Republic of China (1912–1949)) Zhang Zhizhong; (Republic of China (1912–1949)) Ma Chengxiang; (Republic of China (1912–1949)) Ma Xizhen; (Republic of China (1912–1949)) Han Youwen; (Republic of China (1912–1949)) Osman Batur	(Mongolian People's Republic) Khorloogiin Choibalsan; (Soviet Union) Joseph Stalin

Units involved
National Revolutionary Army: 14th Tungan Cavalry Regiment	Mongolian Border Guard; Soviet Air Forces

Strength
1,000–2,500 soldiers	3,000 Mongolian soldiers, 10 Soviet airmen, and 6 Soviet tanks; unknown numbers of air support
- Location within China

The Battle of Baitag Bogd Mountain (Mongolian: Байтаг богдын тулгарал, romanized: Baitag bogdyn tulgaral) or Beitashan Incident (Chinese: 北塔山事件; pinyin: Běitǎshān shìjiàn; Wade–Giles: Pei-ta-shan shih-chien; alternatively Baitak Bogdo incident) was a border conflict between the Republic of China, the Mongolian People's Republic, and the Soviet Union. The Mongolian People's Republic became involved in a border dispute with the Republic of China, as a Hui (Tungan) cavalry regiment was sent by the Chinese government to attack Mongolian and Soviet positions.

== Background ==
The Soviets carried out a genocide in Xinjiang, eliminating dissidents and exiling many in the Gulags of Siberia. Four hundred and thirty-five men, including President Khoja Niyaz, were arrested and executed in 1937. This resulted in a split in the government dominated by Uyghurs and the Kazakh minority that settled in Altai, which ultimately resulted in a revolt. In an effort to support their activities in Xinjiang, the Soviets instructed the Mongols to establish separate administrative units for the Kazakhs and the Altai Uriankhais. In 1940, Bayan – Ölgy province, where the Kazakhs and Uriankhais congregated, was erected from a division of the western province of Khovd. Prime Minister Choibalsan personally supervised this operation and founded the administrative center of the province. In 1942, the Kuomintang party ousted the Soviet government from Xinjiang, and after its official establishment as an autonomous province of China, the minority revolt turned into a full-blown civil war that lasted until 1945.

From this period began a large-scale exodus of Kazakhs from Xinjiang to Mongolia. At the end of the 19th century, a few families left their native Xinjiang, due to natural disasters, and migrated east from the Altai Mountains. Then, during the proclamation of the theocracy of Bogd Khaan, some Kazakhs from Mongolia pledged allegiance to him. From 1921, the refugee movement received the new name of "class struggle". For example, a certain Dabidbai, the leader of the Kazakhs in 1925, informed the Lower House of Parliament that about 340 families influenced by Communist propaganda wanted to settle in Mongolia. The civil war, rebellions, and revolts of the 1930s and 1950s thus provoked the increasing influx of refugees into Mongolia. The province of Bayan – Ölgy was built for the Kazakh exiles. Three hundred and fifteen people from sixty-nine families fled to Mongolia in July 1942. They said they were being looted and robbed and were applying for Mongolian citizenship.

Many tribes like Kazakhs, Kyrgyz, Tajiks, Uyghurs, Hui (Dunganes), and Mongols lived in Xinjiang, but Uyghurs and Kazakhs were in the majority, with over three million and one million, respectively, and half of the people. General Sheng Shicai, the new governor of Xinjiang, had been deeply pro-Soviet before, but later harbored a stubborn hatred towards them and began to lead a miserable life to the Soviet consul and other Soviet nationals in Xinjiang, and to develop their ideology. Stalin was very "unhappy" with this. He, therefore, chose to enlist the Kazakh rebels against the Kuomintang party and General Sheng. He realized that Chiang Kai-shek would be furious if he got “hands-on” straight away, so he decided to use the Mongols as camouflage.

The leader of the insurgents was a man called Ospan (Osman Batyr), nicknamed "tökhör ogaz" or the "yellow lame". Colonel Pakhomov, the head of the NKVD spy office, Mr. P. Kovalyov *, the commander of the Baikal front, and Ivanov, the plenipotentiary representative in Mongolia, directly contacted and assisted Ospan, which indicated the importance of this man for the Soviets. Ospan, who occasionally fled to Mongolia to escape the members of the Kuomintang, eventually sought asylum there for his own family.

The first meeting between Ospan and the Deputy Minister of the Ministry of Internal Affairs, Duinkhorjav, took place at the border in October 1943 and resulted in the signing of an agreement. In this agreement, Mongolia undertook to support the national liberation struggle of the Kazakhs by providing them with arms and goods, welcoming the rebels if necessary, sending 40 to 50 Mongols to the insurgent headquarters, and keeping this pact confidential. The rebels first received twenty-seven vintov [automatic] rifles, ten Mauser pistols, and six hundred yards of cloth, while Ospan was awarded a British automatic pistol with a thousand bullets. But, when Ospan, regularly pursued by the Chinese, migrated to Mongolia, violations of the Mongolian border by the Chinese became more and more frequent. In a few months, more than 2,200 people from 330 families also fled to Mongolia and settled in different areas.

Choibalsan asked Molotov how to handle the issue of constant Chinese border violations and offered to send a protest note to the Chinese government. But, Soviet Ambassador Ivanov said: "Comrade Molotov suggests not to send this note to China, but instead asks you to come to Moscow immediately with the plenipotentiary representative ... for further discussions.'". The latter therefore left for the Kremlin at the end of 1943. Molotov immediately asked: "When it comes to Xinjiang, sending a protest note may be superfluous. It seems preferable for Xinjiang to file a complaint with you. In other words, if we complain about immigrants from Xinjiang, the Chinese will eventually protest against us. Can you try to make this happen?"

The Mongolian leader then replied: "If the Soviet leaders agree and with their help, it seems possible." Stalin accused the Soviet scapegoat, Choibalsan, of being intimidated by the Chinese and asked him to deliver in his name to Ospan what he gave him: 200 Vintov rifles, 200 automatic machine guns, 6 heavy machine guns, 30 machine guns manual, 2,000 hand grenades and 400,000 bullets.

Immediately after his return, Choibalsan left for the Western Region and met Ospan personally. Commander Sukhbaatar's son Galsan delivered these weapons on behalf of Mongolia, which was a symbolic event. On March 11, 1944, the Chinese pursuing Ospan suffered a serious setback against the Soviet Air Squadron and Ospan's Cavalry Battalion. Soon after, the "military unit to support the insurgents" was formed and quickly expanded into a "military council", later renamed "Provisional Government of the Free Kazakhs of Altai". According to nomadic traditions, Ospan was given the title of "Ospan hero" and many insurgents joined him, including those from Il Tarvagatai.

After taking state power in 1949, the Chinese Communisits began to befriend the Soviet Union more than ever, promoting the entry into a "golden age" of domestic politics and of Mongolia. It seemed natural to establish socialism in this small country situated between two communist empires.

Before the Chinese Communists came to power, Mongolia had no direct relations with the Kuomintang government, especially during the quarrel over the Baitag Bogd border in the summer of 1947. Obeying Stalin's orders, the Mongols got involved in the case of the Kazakhs in Xinjiang. However, a few years later, they were forced to welcome a large number of Kazakh refugees, among whom some bandits then revolted and started a riot on the western border. Since the fall of the Qing Dynasty, Manchuria and Xinjiang have passed from one warlord to another. None of the generals who partially conquered Xinjiang were obeying Beijing or Nanking (Nanjing). The Ma clique, which dominated in Ningxia, and that of Sheng Shicai, who reigned in Ürümqi, were the most successful. White people who had lost the civil war in Russia fled there in large numbers. The local commands juggled between Beijing and Moscow and thus managed to ensure their independence. Having conquered West Turkestan and having established a Soviet government there, the Soviets projected their interest on East Turkestan where they sought to create at least an independent Soviet state, Communist East Turkestan. Nevertheless, since 1944, Sheng had recognized Beijing and its possessions as an integral part of Chiang Kai-shek's China.

However, a little later the Kazakhs and other peoples of Xinjiang went on the offensive. Led by Uyghur Akhmedjan Kasym, the rebels conquered Ghulja (Yining) and in 1945 proclaimed the Republic of East Turkestan. Uzbek Ali Khan Tore became the President of the new state, while the people of Osman Batour (Ospan Batyr), having taken Chuguchag [Tacheng, an autonomous city of Xingjiang], united with them. Thus collapsed the colonization of the Chinese nation in Xinjiang. Then, on October 10, 1945, in Ürümqi, Beijing and Moscow began talks on this subject, at the initiative of the Soviets.

During the summer of 1945, the Sino-Soviet negotiations concerned all four issues. Stalin showed skill in dividing them and turning them into two groups of two questions. He said he would not help Mao in the civil war in China and interfere in the Xinjiang problem, in return the belligerents pledged to recognize the independence of Outer Mongolia and resolve the conflict. Question of the special powers of the Soviet Union in Manchuria. In fact, under these agreements, the Soviets adopted a neutral or ambiguous posture vis-а-vis the founders of the new state. On January 21, 1946, after much debate, an "11 article" treaty that recognized the cultural independence of the peoples of Xinjiang was signed and, subsequently, local governments were created. Chiang Kai-shek recognized this treaty and appointed the Tatar Burhan Shahidi * and Uyghur Akhmedjan Kasymov became his deputies. But soon word spread that the Chinese had violated the treaty, and from August 1947 the "coalition" government was overthrown and riots began. As the negotiations were conducted under Soviet mediation, the Soviets now sided with the Chinese, not with the insurgents. In mid-1949, the Chinese Red Army, under the command of General Peng Dehuai, entered Xinjiang, and from then on, new propaganda was circulated explaining that the purpose of the uprising was not "separation from China", but "opposition to feudal lords". In August 1949, the separatists were brought to Frunze (now Bishkek) and then to Almaty, and were forced to erect an autonomous power integrated into China. Kasymov, the national leader of Xinjiang who led the delegation to conclude negotiations with the Communists in Beijing, died on the way in a plane crash. On the way to Beijing, the mission passed through Almaty and Irkutsk in order to meet with the Soviets beforehand and ask them to protect the Republic of East Turkestan in its present state. But, the Il-12 plane he took fell in the Buryat rocky mountains called Khamar davaa. Some say that Kasymov and his compatriots were arrested and killed in Irkutsk and that the plane crash was a lie, which seems likely. Indeed, the Soviet Union then needed Mao's allies, the great propagators of the world revolution, more than the small revolutionaries of Xinjiang. Those in charge, Saifuddin Aziz, and Burhan Shahidi, did not have an accident but fell into the anonymity of political exile.

In early October, 80,000 soldiers from the Xinjiang National Army joined the Communist ranks. In November, Peng Dehua arrived in Ürümqi and explained that since a new "united world" (shijie datong) would be founded, whatever the circumstances, any ideological separatist attempt by small nationalities made no sense.

Only Ospan fought like a rabid tiger. He had now become the enemy of China, Mongolia, and the Soviet Union. Later, the Communists captured and executed him in Ürümqi. For many years, the Soviet Union and China used the national liberation struggle of the Uyghurs and Kazakhs in Xinjiang as an asset and, after reaching an agreement, completely crushed it. Unlike the Mongols, these people were unlucky. In addition, they did not enjoy such a prestigious historical reputation as that of the Mongols.

== Battle ==
The situation in this region became quite complicated after the spring of 1943, Choibalsan, on Stalin's instructions, provided assistance to the rebels of Xinjiang. Ospan, the leader of the rebels, armed himself and fought to the death against Shen Shicai's government in Ürümqi. As a result of a strong attack by the Ürümqi administration on Ospan, thousands of Kazakhs retreated and crossed the border into Mongolian territory. In March 1944, Shen Shicai protested to the Soviet Consul General and demanded that he stop supporting the rebels. In response, TASS released a statement in Ulaanbaatar on April 2 explaining that Chinese forces had driven the Kazakhs to the Mongolian border, so the armed forces of the Republic of Mongolia had driven them from the front.

Ospan led his troops into the same mountains and continued the rebellion. But his soldiers left him, so there are very few of them left. Most of the fugitives, who were no longer controlled, became frontier bandits. They infiltrated the Mongolian border in large numbers and tried to attack the border guards, penetrate deep into the country, rob families, steal horses and livestock.

It was at this time that the battle started. According to the "Allied agreement of 11 points" in 1946, Ospan was appointed governor of the Altai province. But soon the coalition government collapsed. Instead, he went over to the side of the Kuomintang and began to receive weapons and ammunition from there. All Muslims in the area were ruled by General Han Youwen, to whom Ospan became loyal. He was interested in expanding Muslim lands to the north. Speaking to American journalist Doak Barnett, he said: "The border line should run 40 miles (64 km) to Mongolia."

So, under his command, Dungan and Kazakh warriors, led by Ospan, attacked the Mongolian border. They raided the border for 13 months from June 1946 to July 1947. After the expulsion of the Ospans from Mongolia in February 1947, the governor of the Xinjiang garrison, Sun Silian, instructed General Ma Xizhen to help Ospan. On May 18, Ospan crossed the Mongolian border again and captured 8 Mongolian border guards. Immediately after that, the military command of Khovd sent a letter to Ma Xizhen with a demand written in Mongolian: “Baytag Bogd is the territory of the Republic of Muiaulii, therefore we demand that all troops and their horses leave our territory within 48 hours. Otherwise, Ma Xizhen will bear full responsibility for the conflict.”

So, on June 5, 1947, the Mongolian border guards suddenly attacked the Ma Xinzhen area. Immediately, five more Soviet aircraft with red pentagons arrived and bombed. The bombed area was officially part of China. At this time, the Soviets were in control of Tarbagatai, and the bombers apparently took off from there. Thus, the bandits were expelled beyond the border of Mongolia, but further they reached Peitangshan Mountain range, which belongs to China. The southern part of Peitangshan was considered by the Chinese to be their territory, so the invasion was considered an attack on China. Therefore, the Kuomintang government sent a special Muslim military committee from Qinghai to Peitangshan. Thus, in early July 1947, the lands occupied by the Mongols were returned.

The Chinese ambassador in Moscow delivered a note of protest to the Kremlin against the attack on the Mongolian-Soviet border. In response, TASS radio explained the Mongol attack on Xinjiang and stated that there was no Soviet involvement in it. General Song showed the US Ambassador a Soviet military cap and a map of the Soviet Union captured by Mongolian soldiers at the Battle of Peitangshan as documents. The US Embassy in Beijing concluded that in the Peitangshan conflict, Outer Mongolia became the only gofer of Soviet aggression. But Ulaanbaatar said that Baitag Bogd is the territory of Mongolia.

On June 15, 1947, the Ministry of Foreign Affairs of the Mongolian People's Republic issued a statement. The information that the Mongolian army entered China under the cover of Soviet aviation is completely false. The Baitag-Bogd mountains are not Chinese, but the territory of the Mongolian People's Republic. The Chinese army crossed the border of the MPR and began to dig a fortification, camping 15 km inside the border. When the Mongolian border command learned that the Chinese army had entered its territory, they sent negotiators to the commander of the Chinese army and asked them to withdraw their troops. The Chinese commander refused to abide by international practice. Mongolian border guards expelled Chinese soldiers from the country under the cover of several Mongolian aircraft.

The Mongolian army did not cross the Chinese border. On June 9, the bodies of people who were going to negotiate from the Mongolian side were found in the Chinese barracks. The Government of the Mongolian People's Republic has the right to express serious objections and to severely punish the murderer to the Chinese Government and demand compensation from the Chinese Government for the damage caused.

TASS issued the following statement: "The Chinese Foreign Ministry's claim that aircraft bearing Soviet flag markings were involved in the Peitashan conflict is a false provocation." In December, Soviet Foreign Minister Gromyko told the Political Committee of the UN General Assembly that "the Chinese have attacked the territory of Outer Mongolia at Peytashan.

It is believed that the Mongols invaded the Chinese border in order to support the special commissioner of the Soviet intelligence, Li Jihang, in order to conquer Ospan, which was already supported by China, once and for all. Of course, this is a Soviet mission. "The Chinese side captured 8 Outer Mongolian soldiers and 30 horses, and two Chinese soldiers were killed in the bombing," the official statement said. An argument ensued, and a spokesman for the Chinese Ministry of Defense stated that "Outer Mongolian troops have occupied Mount Peitashan in our country." As a result, the issue was discussed at the UN level, and it was stated that "the Peytashan conflict is one of the proofs that the Mongols throughout history carried out external aggression."

However, the Peitashan case is an example of how small nations become victims of conflicts between great powers. There is one unverified but very likely explanation for the cause of the mountain incident. In 1945-1946, there was a terrible lack of fodder for cattle in the region of Mount Peytashan, so settled nomads, mostly Kazakhs, migrated to the Bulgan region of Mongolia and wintered there. Soviet planes pursued the shepherds who crossed the border and killed hundreds of civilians. The order to stop them from crossing the border, pursue them and shoot them came from Stalin through Choibalsan. Because Ospan openly shot the Soviet intelligence officer Abai Khasimov, who was in his army. Stalin was very late to Ospan. After that, Choibalsan sent spies several times to capture Ospan alive, but none of them succeeded.

The Yalta Treaty agreed with Mongolia's current status quo, while the Sino-Soviet Treaty agreed with Mongolia with its "current borders". However, this "current border" was very confusing because it was not demarcated. One of the confusing moments was Beitashan. This border point suddenly attracted attention to "regulate" bandits and nomads crossing the border.

But for the Mongols, Baitag Bogd was a matter of principle, and for the Chinese, Peitashan was a matter of preventing the next Mongol invasion. This is due to the fact that, according to the Khiagt Agreement of 1915, most of the 7 counties of Uryankhai, or beyond Altai, were excluded from the territory of Outer Mongolia. Since 1924, Outer Mongolia demanded that the leadership of Xinjiang return the territory of Altai to Mongolia. In the course of the "new state policy" of 1907, the Altai Territory was separated from the Khovd district and annexed to Xinjiang. Palt was appointed head of the new district, but he had a bad relationship with the Khureni people. According to the Russian-Chinese Declaration of 1913 and the Tripartite Treaty of 1915, it was decided that the Altai District would be located outside Khovd. This was done de facto when Xu Shuizhen entered Mongolia in 1919 and the controversy surrounding the Yellow Temple continued because of this. On May 20, 1924, an official letter sent by the Mongolian government to Shar-Sum's governor, Li Chongxi, stated: "While our Mongols established a special province for the Altai Uriankhians, your Chinese government arbitrarily annexed the Altai District to Xinjiang, canceling the rights of the Mongols to reside in the Altai Territory... Capturing and turning it into one's own is incompatible with the ideals of the great Chinese revolution, ”and Li Chunxi demanded to leave Altai. The Mongols were unhappy with this division, so the Chinese feared that if Peitashan was taken, then in the next round they would attack Altai.

Since there is no Chinese embassy in Ulaanbaatar, the parties argued in Moscow, and the ambassadors exchanged more than 10 notes of protest. The Chinese did not stop there and complained to the UN about the aggression of Mongolia. Later, even after Mao came to China, the Peitashan controversy continued. In the mid-1950s, there was another shooting here, and people died in the shootout from both sides. Then, for many years, both sides "peacefully" conflicted, driving people to the settlement, collecting hay and conducting geological exploration in the area that they considered the border. Finally, in 1962, when Mongolia and China demarcated and established a border, the disputed lands were divided and the problem was settled once and for all.

== In popular culture ==
The Battle of Baitag Bogd was portrayed in a 2016 Mongolian film titled Маш нууц 2: Байтаг богд ("Top Secret 2: Baitag Bogd"), a standalone sequel to Маш нууц ("Top Secret") released the same year which portrays the abuse of power in the army in the 1960s.

== See also ==
- Ili Rebellion
