= Butochiyn Tsog =

Mongolian politician and general (1912–1989)

- Бутачийн Цог

Chief of the General Staff of the People's Army
- In office 1965–1970
- Preceded by: Dorjiin Gombojav
- Succeeded by: Jamsrangijn Jondon

Personal details
- Born: 25 May 1912 Sergelen, Töv, Mongolia
- Died: 10 August 1989 (aged 77) Ulaanbaatar, Mongolia
- Spouse: Natalya Barsukova
- Children: 2
- Education: Military Academy of the General Staff of the Armed Forces of the Soviet Union
- Military Service
- Allegiance: Mongolian People's Republic; USSR
- Branch: Mongolian People's Army
- Service years: 1936 - 1985
- Rank: Colonel General
- Conflicts: World War Two; East Prussian offensive; Soviet–Japanese border conflicts; Battle of Khalkin Gol

Butochiyn Tsog (Mongolian: Бутачийн Цог) was a Mongolian politician and military leader in the Mongolian People's Republic from the 1950s up until 1985. He is credited with building Mongolian military strength in the 60s and 70s.

== Biography ==
He was born 25 May 1912 in Mongolia. At the age of 10, he was a student at Manjushri Monastery. From 1929, he worked as a raw material manager, head of a cooperative and head of a department in the State Cooperative and “Mongol Teeh”. In 1937, he graduated from the Sumy Artillery School in Ukraine. He headed the Artillery Division of the Mongolian military. During Battles of Khalkhin Gol, he fought with famous Soviet military leaders such as Georgy Zhukov and Nikolai Voronov. In 1945, he participated in the East Prussian offensive. During these operations, he led a Red Army tank brigade.

After the end of World War II, he continued his service in the Mongolian People's Army. He graduated from the Military Academy of the General Staff in 1956, becoming the first Mongolian graduate of the academy. He contributed to the establishment of a civil aviation industry separate from the Mongolian Air Force. He has held senior positions in the Mongolian Army, such as Chief of Staff (1965-1970), Deputy Minister of Defense, and First Deputy Minister of Defense. In these roles, he commanded the annual Naadam parade on Sükhbaatar Square and received it once in 1980 after Jarantyn Avkhia came down with an illness. In 1985, he retired and went to Moscow with his wife. In August 1989, Tsog arrived in the Mongolian capital to celebrate the golden jubilee (50th anniversary) of Khalkin Gol, where he died on the 10th of that month.

== Legacy ==
On July 8, 2012, by the resolution of the Presidium of the Aimag Citizens' Representative Khural, a monument to Tsog exists in Zuunmod in the Töv Province. The 016th Mechanised Brigade based at Sergelen near Ulaanbaatar is named after him.

== Personal life ==
He was married to Natalya Barsukova, an ethnic Russian. He had 2 children, Gennady and Svetlana, and 5 grandchildren Kocsis, Balazs, Hervert, Tsog and Beata. His son Gennady (1939-2012) was a major general living in Hungary. The father and son were only one of two cases in which a general's son later became a general.

== Awards ==
=== Mongolia ===
- Hero of the Mongolian People's Republic (March 13, 1981)
- 5 Orders of Sukhbaatar
- 2 Orders of the Red Banner
- 3 Orders of the Polar Star
- Order "For Service in Battle"
- Medal "We have won"
- Medal "25 Years of People's Revolution"

=== USSR ===
- Order of Lenin
- Order of the Patriotic War
- Medal "For the Victory over Germany in the Great Patriotic War 1941–1945"
- Medal "For the Victory over Japan"
- Jubilee Medal "30 Years of the Soviet Army and Navy"
- Jubilee Medal "Twenty Years of Victory in the Great Patriotic War of 1941-1945"
- Jubilee Medal "Thirty Years of Victory in the Great Patriotic War of 1941-1945"
- Jubilee Medal "Forty Years of Victory in the Great Patriotic War of 1941-1945"
