= Mongolian State Honor Guard =

Ceremonial unit in Mongolia

- Монголын Tөрийн Xүндэт Xаруул
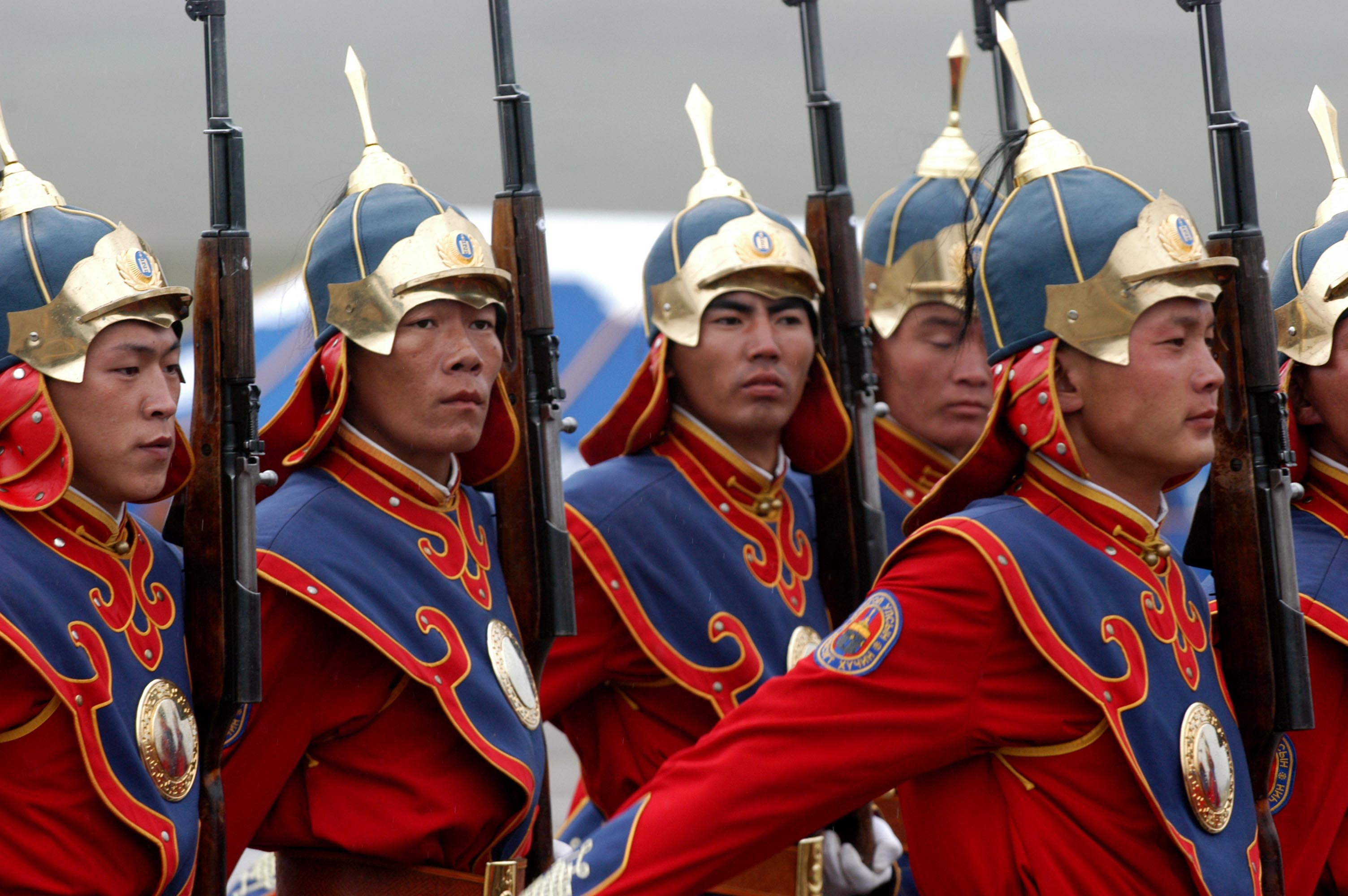
- The battalion at Khaan Quest in 2007.
- Active: 16 August 1955; 70 years ago
- Country: Mongolia
- Branch: Mongolian Armed Forces
- Type: Honor Guard
- Role: Ceremonial guard
- Part of: 032 Military Unit
- Garrison/HQ: Ulaanbaatar

Commanders
- Notable commanders: Jamsrangijn Jondon

Insignia
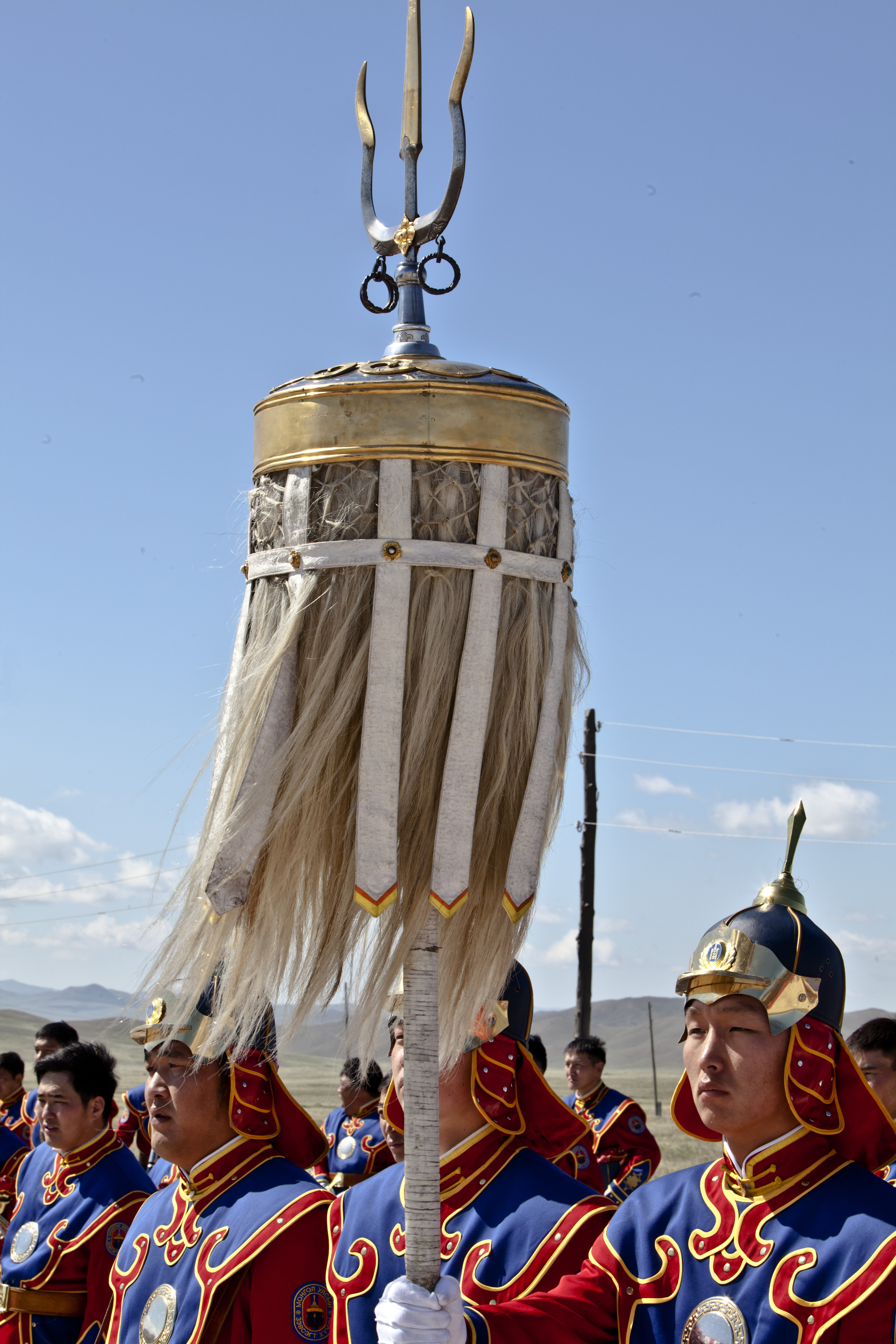
- Ceremonial Tug

The Mongolian State Honor Guard (Mongolian: Монголын Tөрийн Xүндэт Xаруул) is an honor guard unit of the Armed Forces of Mongolia. The Mongolian State Honor Guard was founded on 16 August 1955, as an honor guard unit of the People's Army of the Mongolian People's Republic.

== Overview ==
The honor guard company's different units participate in all major events organized by the Ministry of Defense, such as state arrival ceremonies for foreign heads of state (dignitaries such as Vladimir Putin, Xi Jinping and Shinzo Abe), government and military delegations during their official visits to Ulaanbaatar, as well as a large number of other diverse events. Domestically, another major event is the annual Mongolian State Flag Day parade on Sükhbaatar Square. It also had taken part in the anniversaries of the Battles of Khalkhin Gol and the Khaan Quest military exercise. In 2015, the guard of honor took part in over 200 ceremonial events, including the Moscow Victory Day Parade on Red Square. Members of the unit are required to be 180 cm (5 ft 11 in) tall and have good physical traits.

It is the only unit authorized to carry a ceremonial white tug as its unit colour on parade.

== Uniform ==
While Mongolia was under a socialist government, the unit's uniform did not differ much from the full dress uniform of the Soviet Army. After 1991, the uniforms from the era of Genghis Khan and the Mongol Empire came back into style within the armed forces. Today, the uniform of the guard is based on the garment of the personal guard of the Great Khan. Throughout the years, the unit uniform has been changed 3 times: in 1970, 2006, and 2011.

== Gallery ==
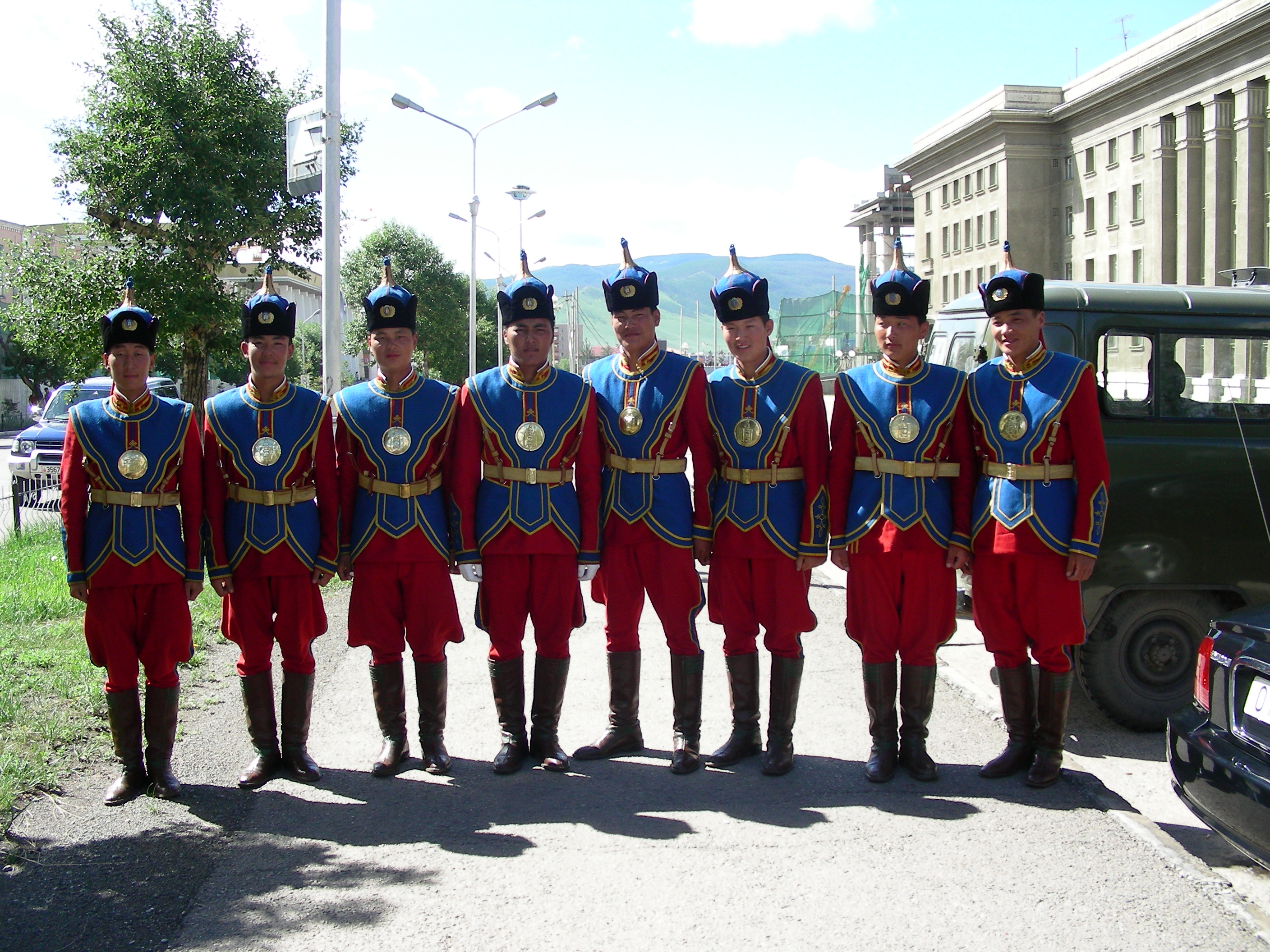
Mongolian State Honor Guard personnel in traditional uniform during the 800th anniversary of the founding of the Mongolian Empire by Genghis Khan in 2006.

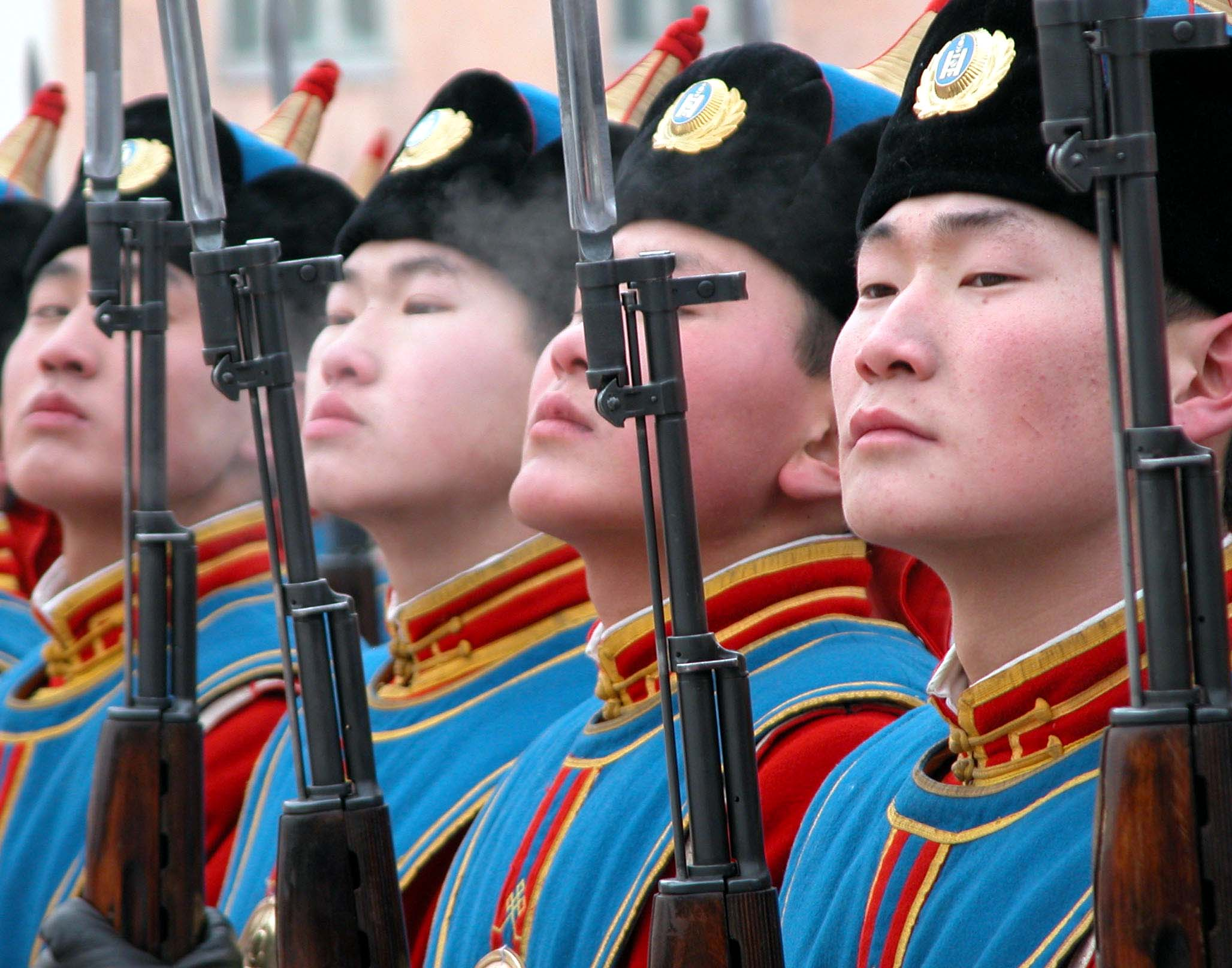
The honor guard during the arrival ceremony for United States Air Force General Richard B. Myers visit to Mongolia in 2004.

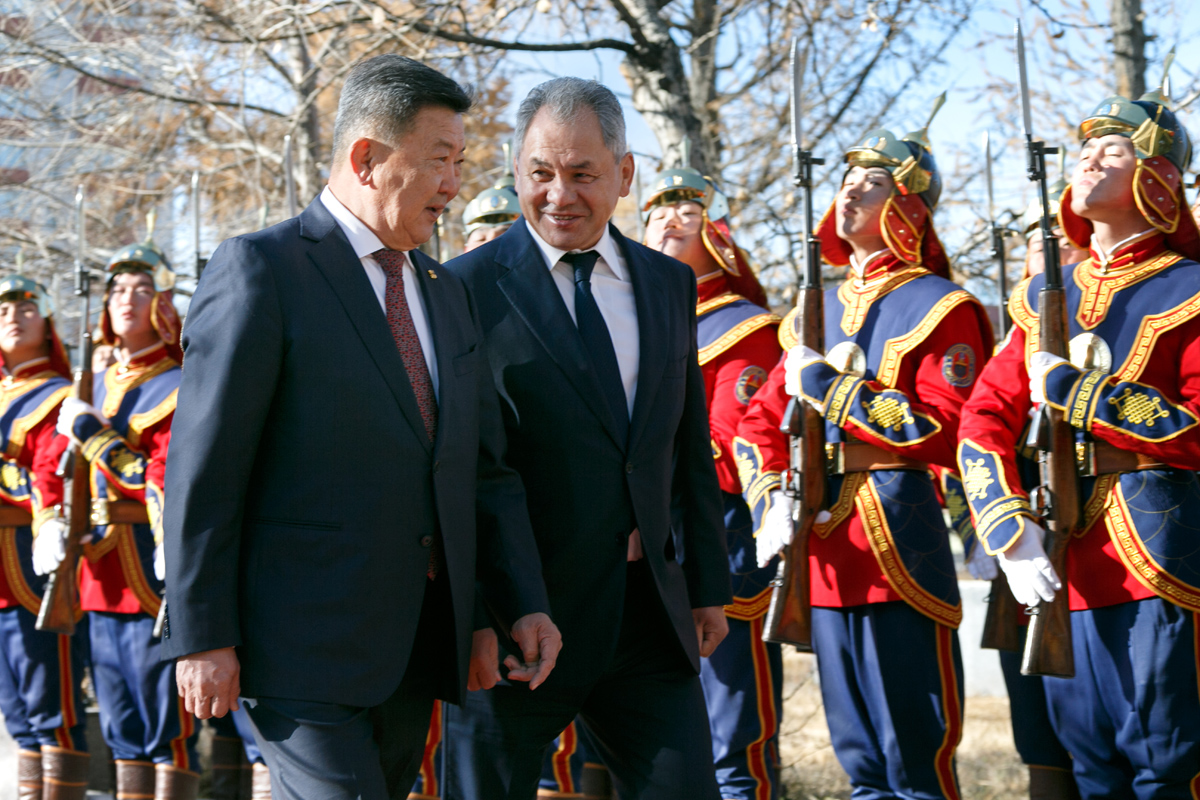
Sergey Shoigu and Nyamaagiin Enkhbold inspecting the guard in October 2018.

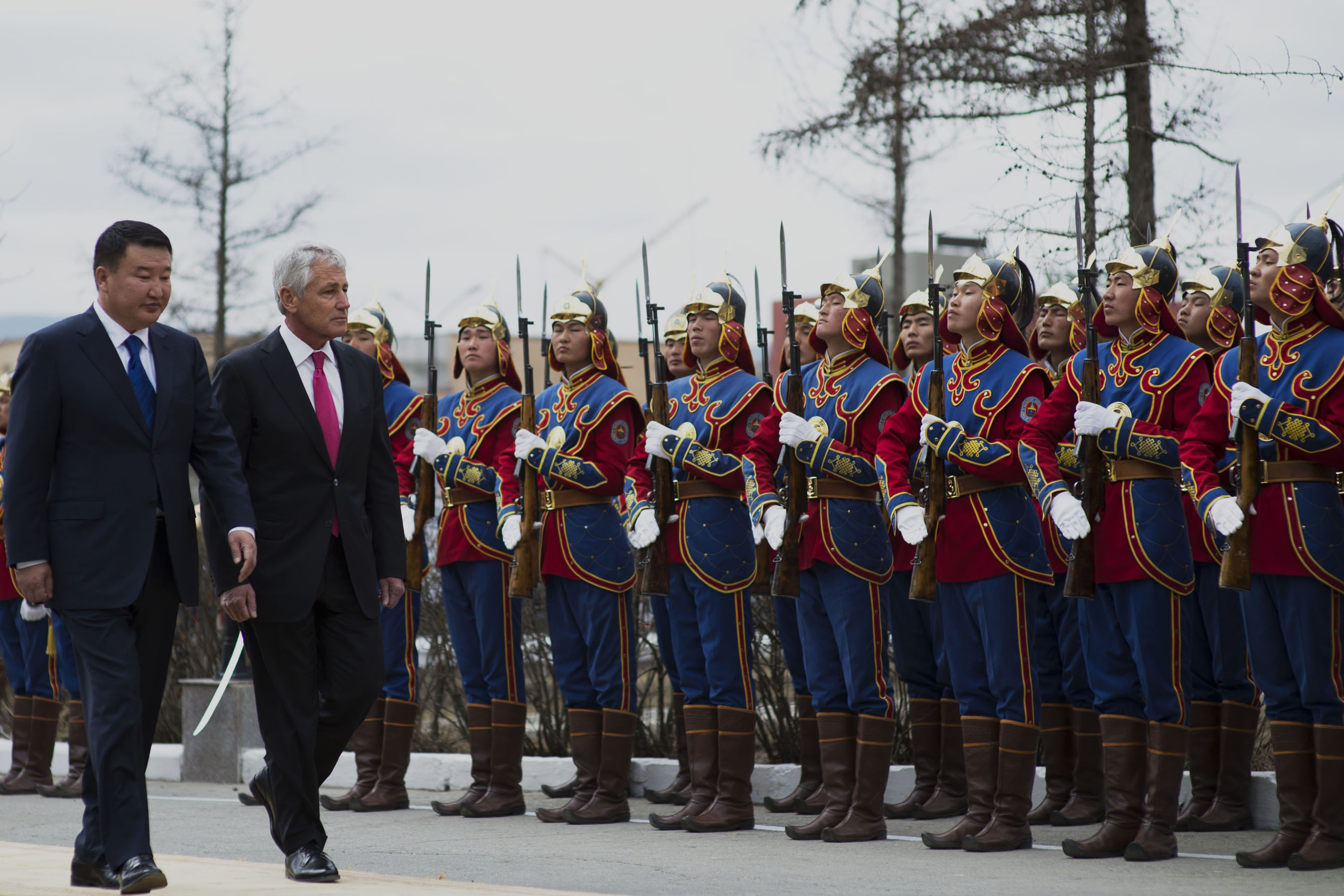
Defense Secretary Chuck Hagel and Defense Minister Dashdemberal Bat-Erdene review the State Honor guard at the defense ministry headquarters.

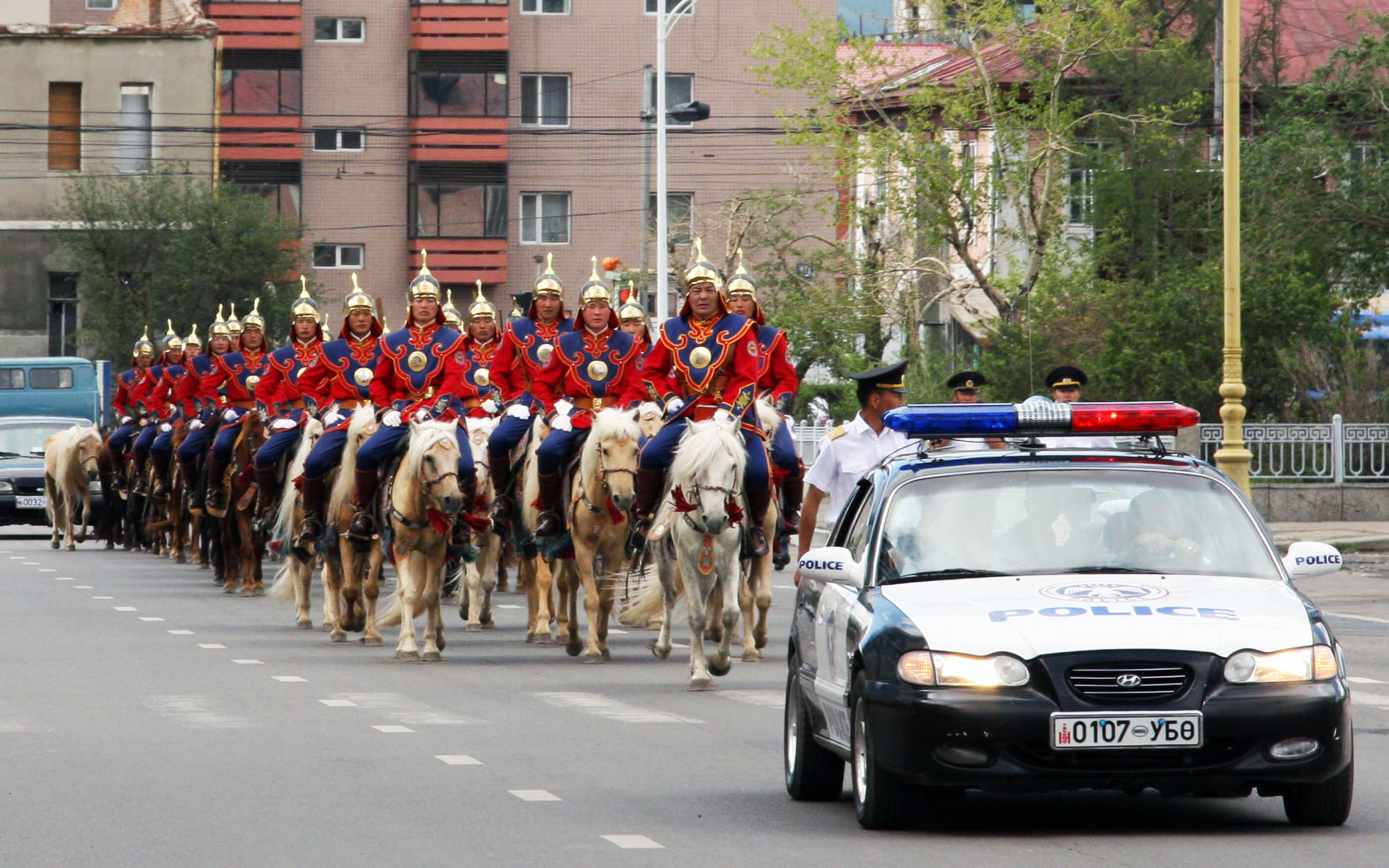
A mounted cavalry unit of the guard being escorted by local police during a procession to Naadam.

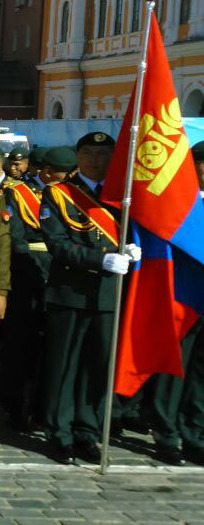
A unit flag bearer in Moscow.

== See also ==
- Mongol military tactics and organization
- Military Band of the General Staff of the Armed Forces of Mongolia
- Aibyn Presidential Regiment
- Volgograd Honour Guard
