= Rashmaagiin Gavaa =

Chief of the General Staff of the Mongolian Armed Forces

- Native name: Рашмаагийн Гаваа
- Born: February 25, 1949 (age 77); Bayandalai, Ömnögovi, Mongolia
- Allegiance: Mongolian People's Republic; Mongolia
- Branch: Mongolian People's Army; Mongolian Armed Forces
- Service years: 1967—1996
- Rank: Major general

Major general Rashmaagiin Gavaa (Mongolian: Рашмаагийн Гаваа) was a Mongolian military leader and Chief of General Staff from October 1990 to August 1996.

== Career ==
Rashmaagiin Gavaa was born on February 25, 1949, in Bayandalai, Ömnögovi. He joined the Mongolian People's Army in 1967 and was educated at the Frunze Military Academy and the Voroshilov Academy of the General Staff, as well as the United States Naval Academy. Over his career, he worked in various structures of the ministry of defense. In October 1990, the government of Prime Minister Dashiin Byambasüren appointed General Gavaa as the first Chief (Darga) of the General Staff of the Mongolian Armed Forces. He retired in August 1996. After retirement, he served as the director of the Institute of Military History of the Ministry of Defense. He was elected to the State Great Khural in 2000.

Mongolian Armed Forces Unit No. 013 is named in honor of Major General Gavaa (honour conferred on 18 March 2009), as well as the Military Communications Complex Competition.
