= Order of the Polar Star (Mongolia) =

State award of Mongolia

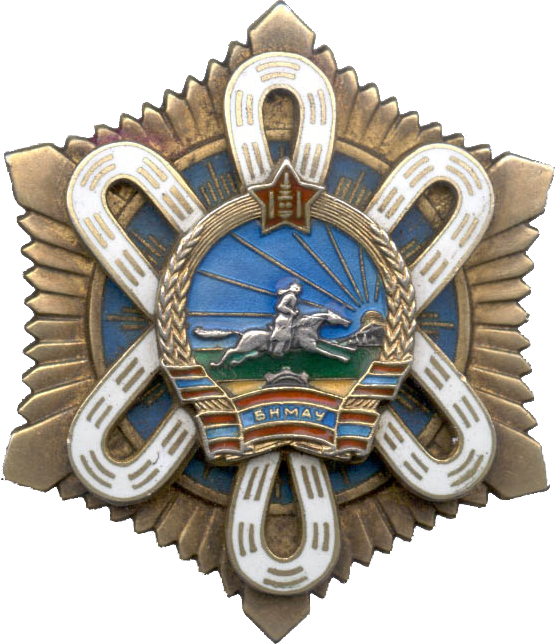
- The award medal
- Type: Award
- Awarded for: Special merits in society
- Presented by: Mongolia
- Eligibility: Mongolian and foreign citizens
- Status: Active
- Established: 1936

Highlights
- Total: 30,000
- Ribbon of the order

Precedence
- Next (higher): Order of the Precious Wand

The Order of the Polar Star (Mongolian: Алтан гадас одон Altan Gadas Odon, Traditional Mongolian: ᠠᠯᠲᠠᠨ ᠭᠠᠳᠠᠰᠤ ᠣᠳᠤᠨ) is a state award of Mongolia. The order was created in 1936. The regulation was approved by the resolution of the Presidium of the Small Khural and the Council of Ministers of the Mongolian People's Republic on May 16, 1941.

== Description ==
It comes in four types: Type 1 (1936), Type 2 (1940), Type 3 (1940–41), Type 4 (1970). For everyday wear, the order had a symbol in the form of an order bar. Until 1961, the bar of the order was rectangular metal, covered with colored enamel. Since 1961, the enamel strips have been replaced by strips covered with ribbons in the order's colors.

== Previous recipients ==
=== From Mongolia ===
- Khorloogiin Choibalsan
- Luvsannorovyn Erdenechimeg
- Damba Ayusheev
- Sonomyn Luvsangombo
- Jamsrangijn Jondon
- Gombojav Khand
- Zaluuchuudyn Unen Newspaper
- Tsog Magazine
- National Museum of Mongolia
- Central Military Hospital
- Hakuhō Shō
- A.Nomuun-Para olympic swimmer
- Ariuntuul Garidkhuu

=== From America ===
- Barack Obama
- Hillary Clinton
- Peace Corps Mongolia
- John McCain
- Pamela J. H. Slutz
- John W. Olsen
- Ted Yoho
- Jack Weatherford
- Greta van Susteren
- Maria Fernández-Giménez
- Richard P. Reading
- James F. Wagenlander
- Walter Jenkins
- Myrna Ann Adkins
- Thomas Blomster
- Duren Walters
- W. Ian Lipkin
- Richard E. Cook
- James Pigg

=== From Russia ===
- Kliment Voroshilov
- Yury Luzhkov
- Okna Tsahan Zamn
- Gavriil Ilizarov
- Alexander Novikov
- Vladimir Shatalov
- Iskander Azizov
- Valery Zorkin
- Sergey Neklyudov
- St Petersburg University

=== Other ===
- Amanda Baric (Australia)
- Małgorzata Gosiewska (Poland)
- Krzysztof Stanowski (Poland)
- R. K. Sabharwal (India)
- Princess Maha Chakri Sirindhorn (Thailand)
- Gil Gang Muk (South Korea)
- Cai Wenrui (China)
- Wang Yi (China)
- Temasek Foundation (Singapore)
- Miroslav Bobek (Czech Republic)
- Asahifuji Seiya (Japan)
- István Joó (Hungary)

== See also ==
- Orders, decorations, and medals of Mongolia
