= Jamsrangijn Jondon =

Jamsrangiin Yondon
- Жамсрангийн Ёндон

Minister of Defense of the Mongolian People's Republic
- In office 1982–1989
- Preceded by: Jarantyn Avkhia
- Succeeded by: Luvsangombyn Molomjamts

Chief of General Staff of the Mongolian People's Army
- In office 1971–1974
- Preceded by: Butochiyn Tsog
- Succeeded by: Purevdorj Choiront

Personal details
- Born: 18 March 1923 Mönkhkhaan, Sükhbaatar, Mongolia
- Died: 23 July 1992 (69 years old) Mongolia
- Education: Frunze Military Academy; Military Academy of the General Staff
- Awards: Order of the October Revolution; Order of the Red Banner; Order of the Polar Star; Order of the Red Banner of Military Merit; Order of Sukhbaatar

Military service
- Allegiance: Mongolian People's Republic
- Branch/service: Mongolian People's Army
- Years of service: 1940—1990
- Rank: Colonel general
- Commands: Mongolian State Honor Guard
- Battles/wars: World War Two

Colonel general Jamsrangijn Jondon (Mongolian: Жамсрангийн Ёндон) was a Mongolian military leader and Minister of Defense of the Mongolian People's Republic from 1982 to 1989. Many of the reforms of the Mongolian People's Army from 1965 to 1989 were initiated by Jondon.

== Biography ==
He was born in 1923 in Mönkhkhaan, Sükhbaatar. He was born in the Erdene Gunii Monastery. In 1940, at the age of 17, he volunteered for army service and served as a soldier and lieutenant in the 15th Cavalry Corps of the 6th Cavalry Division in Dornod Province. He participated in World War II as Suman's political deputy. He was repeatedly elected to the People's Congress of the People's Republic of Mongolia. In 1945, he commanded a military parade in the capital for the first time. From 1950-1955, students of the Officer's School named after General Sukhbaatar served as the Honor Guard for the nation. During this period, he took part in the state visits of more than 10 guests from Asia and Europe who attended the 30th anniversary of the Mongolian Revolution in 1951. In 1955, Jondon, then being a captain, was appointed as the first commander of the Mongolian State Honor Guard, and was popularly known as the "Report Jondon" by his collogues. He was also the first to be awarded the Polar Star for his role as Honor Guard Commander in ceremonies.

By the 1960s, he had been one of the youngest generals in Mongolia, receiving his education from the Soviet Union. From 1971 to 1974, he was Chief of General Staff of the MPA. He was appointed to the role of Defence Minister in 1982, after Jarantyn Avkhia resigned. He was promoted to the rank of Colonel general shortly thereafter. After over 20 years of research, the groundbreaking ceremony of the Mongolian Military Museum took place on 24 October 1987 in the presence of General Jondon and General Secretary Jambyn Batmönkh. In 1988, he was elected a delegate to the 19th Congress of the Mongolian People's Party, and was ousted the following year.

== Awards ==
His work was recognized with the Order of Sukhbaatar twice, the Order of the Red Banner of Military Merit, the Order of Military Merit three times each, and the Order of the Polar Star and commemorative medals. He was also awarded the Order of the Red Banner and the Order of the October Revolution of the USSR.

== Legacy ==
A monument and memorial complex to him exists in the center of his native Sukhbaatar Province (located in Baruun-Urt). His former unit, now expanded into the 032 Military Unit, is named in his honor.
