= Vladimir Khuva =

Chief of the General Staff of the Mongolian Armed Forces

- Владими Хува
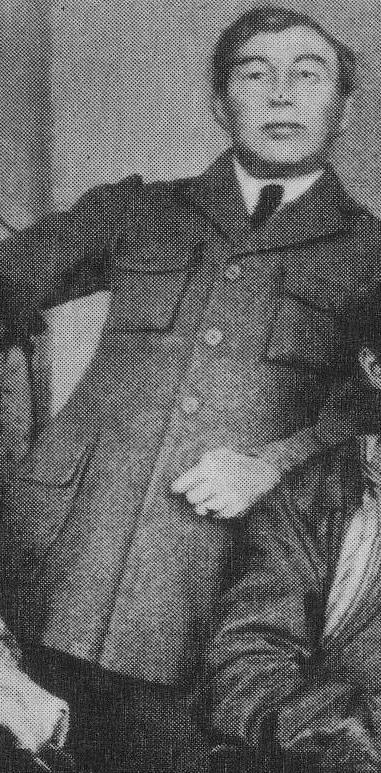
- Born: Vladimir Aleksandrovich Khuva; Russian Empire
- Military career
- Allegiance: Mongolian People's Republic
- Branch: Mongolian People's Army; Red Army
- Service years: 1900s—1920s
- Rank: Lieutenant Colonel
- Conflicts: Russo-Japanese War, World War I, Russian Civil War, Mongolian Revolution of 1921

Vladimir Aleksandrovich Khuva (Mongolian: Владимир Александрович Хува) was a Soviet and Mongolian military leader who was one of the earliest and most influential Soviet military advisors in Mongolia during the formative years of the Mongolian People's Republic. As Chief of the General Staff of the People's Army from September 1921 to September 1922. He played a key role in organizing and modernizing the Mongolian Army following the Mongolian Revolution of 1921.

== Early life and military career ==
Little is known about Khuva's early life. He served as a lieutenant colonel in the Imperial Russian Army and participated in both the Russo-Japanese War and World War I. After the 1917 October Revolution, he joined the Bolsheviks and became a member of the Executive Committee of the Yenisei Soviet.

During the Russian Civil War, Khuva served as Chief of the Department of Reserve Armies in the Eastern Siberian Military District and later as an Infantry Inspector of the 5th Army of the RSFSR 5th Army.

== Service in Mongolia ==
In September 1921, Khuva was appointed Chief of Staff of the newly formed Mongolian People's Army. At the time, Mongolia lacked experienced military leaders and relied heavily on Soviet expertise to organize its forces. Khuva was one of the first high-ranking Soviet officers to assist directly in the training, structuring, and leadership of the Mongolian military. On April 24, 1922, Khuva was officially mandated by the Revolutionary Military Council, alongside Khorloogiin Choibalsan, to represent Mongolia in Moscow.

His tenure marked a significant step in the institutional development of the Mongolian Armed Forces. Under his guidance, military units were restructured, staff training systems were implemented, and the defense capabilities of the fledgling state were expanded. After one year as Chief of Staff, Khuva was appointed head of the War Ministry and a member of the Revolutionary Military Council.

== Honors ==
- Order of the Red Banner (USSR)
- Order of Erdeni-Batchir (Mongolia)
- Order of the Precious Wand
