= General Staff of the Armed Forces =

General Staff of the Armed Forces may refer to:

- General Staff of Azerbaijani Armed Forces
- General Staff of the Armed Forces (Albania)
- General Staff of the Armenian Armed Forces
- General Staff of the Armed Forces of Belarus
- General Staff of the Armed Forces (Croatia)
- General Staff of the Armed Forces of the Islamic Republic of Iran
- General Staff of Armed Forces (Kyrgyzstan)
- General Staff of the Mongolian Armed Forces
- General Staff of the Polish Armed Forces
- General Staff of the Armed Forces (Portugal)
- General Staff of the Armed Forces of the Russian Federation
- General Staff of the Turkish Armed Forces
- General Staff of the Ukrainian Armed Forces
