= Amanda Baric =

Australian anaesthesiologist

Amanda Baric AM is an Australian anaesthetist and medical educator. She is Deputy Director of Anaesthesia and Perioperative Medicine at Northern Health and a senior clinical lecturer at the University of Melbourne. She teaches anaesthesiology in Australia and around the world. Baric has contributed to anaesthesia education and training programs in Mongolia, including a long-running collaboration between Australian and Mongolian anaesthetists. She received Mongolia's Order of the Polar Star in 2021 for her contribution to healthcare and anaesthesia training in the country.

Baric has also been involved with Developing Anaesthesia, an educational initiative that provides freely accessible teaching materials for anaesthetists working in countries with limited resources. Its materials have included seminars, textbooks and modular training resources used in the Mongolia program.

Baric is an author on the Peri-operative Medicine and Anaesthesia textbook which includes chapters on smoking and anaesthesia, liver disease, hypertension, and basics of pain. She is also an author on the book Obstetric Anaesthesia, which was published in July 2006. This book contents include topics on sepsis, epidural test doses, maternal cardiac disease, and anaesthesia for caesarean section.

== Awards and honours ==
- Member of the Order of Australia 2024 for "significant service to anaesthesiology, pain medicine and tertiary education"
- Fellow of Australian and New Zealand College of Anaesthetists (FANZCA)
- Robert Orton Medal in 2022 from the Australian and New Zealand College of Anaesthetists
- Order of the Polar Star, Mongolia's highest state honour for non-citizens
