= Dovchinsurengiin Ganzorig =

Mongolian Armed Forces major general (born 1971)

- Довчинсүрэнгийн Ганзориг
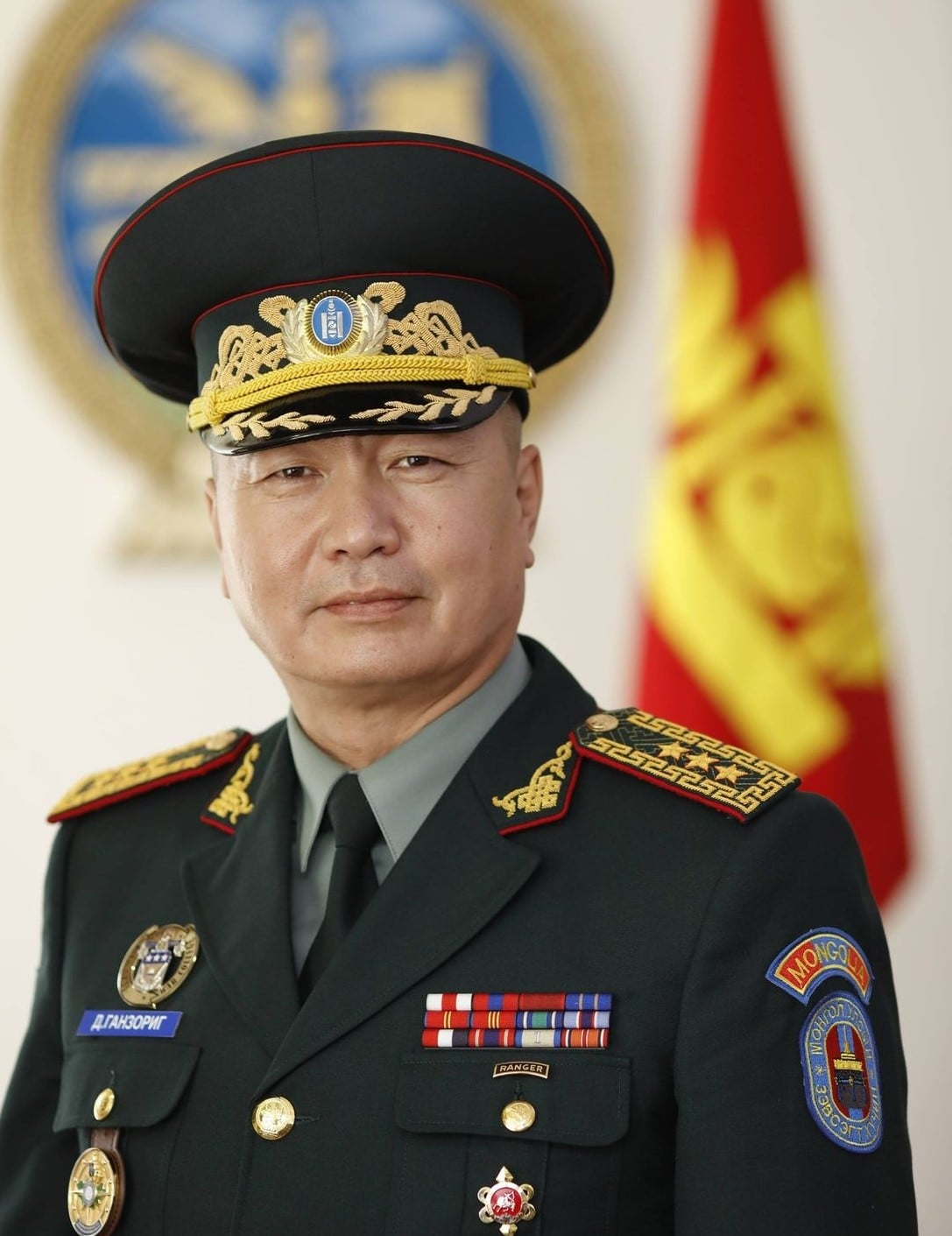
- Born: 1971 (age 54–55); Mongolia
- Education: United States Army War College
- Military career
- Allegiance: Mongolia
- Branch: Mongolian Ground Force
- Service years: 1995-present
- Rank: Lieutenant General
- Website: https://www.gsmaf.gov.mn/

Dovchinsürengiin Ganzorig (born 1971) is a Mongolian Armed Forces Lieutenant General who served as the Chief of the General Staff of the Mongolian Armed Forces from 2019 to 2022.

== Early life and education ==
Ganzorig was born in Mongolia in 1971. He attended School No. 8 from 1980 to 1990. He graduated from the Tambov Higher Military Command Academy of Chemical Defense in Russia in 1995 and was commissioned as an infantry officer in the Mongolian Armed Forces.

From 1999 to 2000, he attended courses at the Chinese Special Forces School. From 2001 to 2002, he attended the United States Infantry Officer Course and the United States Army Ranger School, becoming the first Mongolian officer to complete the latter. He later graduated from the United States Marine Corps Command and Staff College and the U.S. Army War College in 2012.

He holds three master's degrees: in technical sciences from Russia, and in military science and strategic studies from the United States, as well as a Ph.D. in military sciences. As part of his studies at the U.S. Army War College, he wrote a research project titled "Mongolia's Third Neighbor Policy: Impact on the Mongolian Armed Forces."

== Career ==
From 1995 to 1997, he was a platoon commander in the 119th Armed Forces Unit, and from 1997 to 2002, was a trainer in the Special Task Battalion 150 of the Mongolian Armed Forces. From 2001 to 2002, he served as a United Nations military observer with the United Nations Mission for the Referendum in Western Sahara (MINURSO). From 2002 to 2003, he was deputy head of the Peace Support Operations Training Center at the Unit 311, Joint Training Center of the Mongolian Armed Forces. From 2004 to 2005, he served as an operations officer during Operation Iraqi Freedom in Iraq. He also served as a contingent commander with the United Nations Mission in Sierra Leone (UNAMSIL) and the United Nations Mission in Liberia (UNMIL).

From 2003 to 2007, he served as a staff officer at the General Staff of the Mongolian Armed Forces. He served as head of the center from 2008 to 2010. From 2010 to 2011, he served as a referent at the Executive Office of the National Security Council. From 2012 to 2014, he served as deputy department chief at the General Staff of the Mongolian Armed Forces. From 2014 to 2019, he served as department chief at the General Staff of the Mongolian Armed Forces. Following the resignation of Major General Ayushiin Ganbat, President Khaltmaagiin Battulga appointed D.Ganzorig to the post of Chief of the General Staff with the consent of the State Great Khural on October 4, 2019. He served as Chief of the General Staff until 2022, when he was released from the position to take up another appointment. By 2026, he was affiliated with the Center for Military Art Studies of the Defense Research Institute of Mongolia, where he published research on strategic assessment.

== Awards and decorations ==
Ranger Tab
MINURSO Medal
UNOMSIL Medal
UNMIL Medal
Polish Army Medal
Polish Iraq Star
Medal of the Peace Service
Medal of the Military Honor
Order of the Red Banner for Military Valor
Honorary Badge of the Ministry of Defense
Inducted into the Defense Language Institute English Language Center (DLIELC) International Wall of Fame in 2022.
