= Dulamsürengiin Davaa =

Mongolian politician and military leader

Lieutenant General Dulamsürengiin Davaa
- Дуламсүрэнгийн Даваа
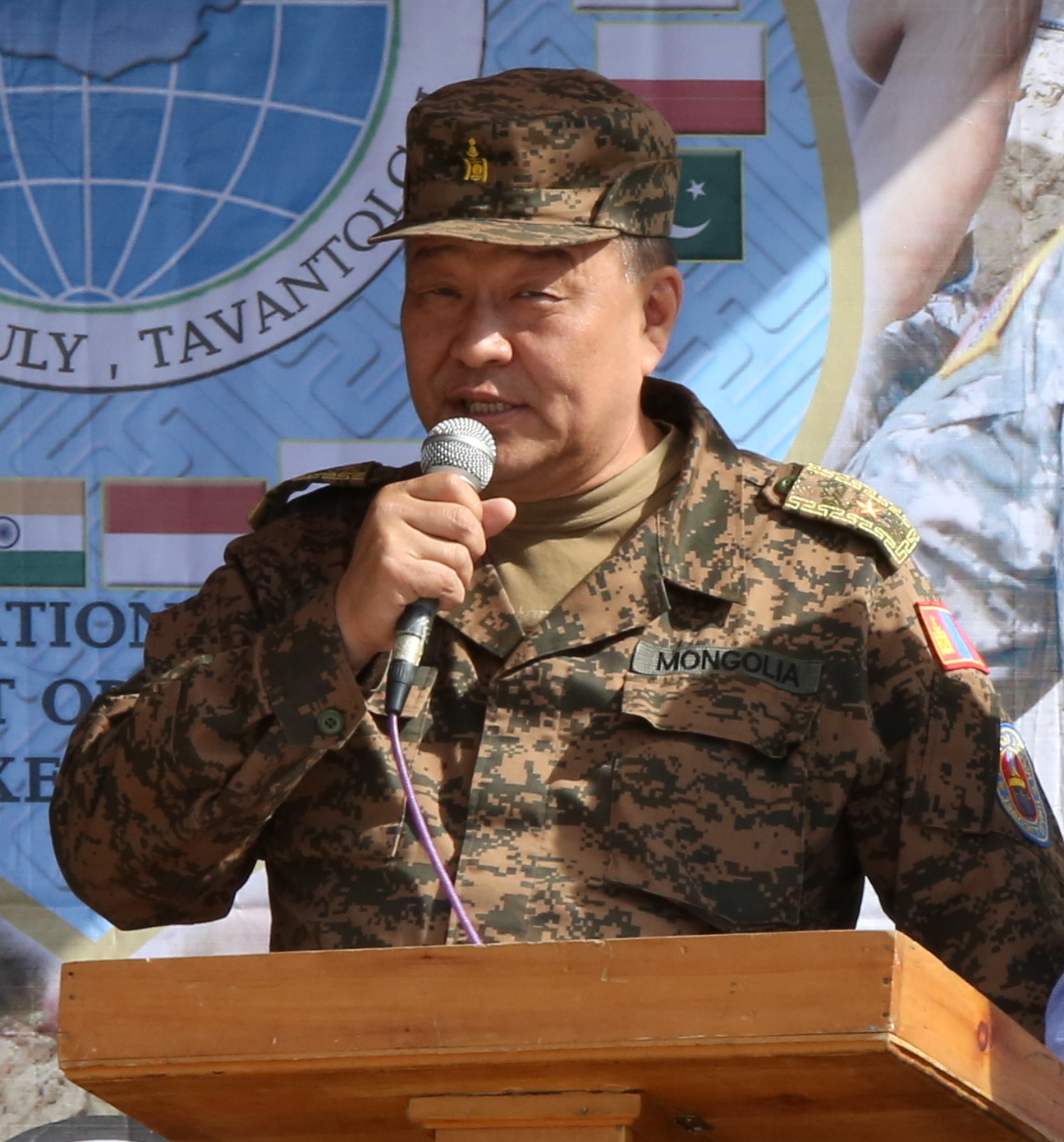

Chief of the General Staff
- In office 19 June 2015 – 14 November 2018
- President: Tsakhiagiin Elbegdorj; Khaltmaagiin Battulga
- Preceded by: Lt.Gen. Tserendejidiin Byambajav
- Succeeded by: Maj.Gen. Radnaabazar Sukhbat (Acting Chief)

Personal details
- Born: 29 December 1963 (age 62) Selenge Province, Mongolian People's Republic
- Profession: Military leader

Military service
- Allegiance: Mongolia
- Branch/service: Mongolian Ground Force
- Years of service: 1981–Present
- Rank: Lieutenant General

Lieutenant General Dulamsürengiin Davaa (Mongolian: Дуламсүрэнлин Даваа) is a Mongolian politician and military leader who was the former Chief of the General Staff under Presidents Tsakhiagiin Elbegdorj and Khaltmaagiin Battulga beginning in June 2015 until November 2018.

Davaa was born in December 1963 in the Mongolian People's Republic. He joined the Mongolian People's Army in 1981 at age 18, attending a training course at the Selenge Province Training Center. In 1994, he graduated from the St. Petersburg Railway Troops Military Transportation Institute of the Russian Army, graduating with a commission in operative tactics. That same year, he also studied at the Volsk High Rear Military School. In the years since then, he has headed the 162nd Food and Garment Unit, served in the National Defense University and headed financial and service departments in the General Staff. Following the resignation of Lieutenant General Tserendejidiin Byambajav, President Elbegdorj appointed Davaa to the post of Chief of the General Staff with the consent of the State Great Khural, concurrently being conferred to the rank of Major General. During his tenure, he was responsible for expanding ties with the Chinese People's Liberation Army, telling Air Force General Xu Qiliang during an October 2016 visit to Beijing that China–Mongolia military relations are a "priority" and sought to conduct more frequent joint exercises and cooperate at a higher level. President Khaltmaagiin Battulga relieved him of his duties in November 2018 in connection to his new appointment of a different post as the President's advisor for Defense and Security. President Khaltmaagiin Battulga appointed Davaa Dulamsuren as Ambassador Extraordinary and Plenipotentiary of Mongolia to the Russian Federation on November 29.
