= Central Military Hospital (Mongolia) =

Hospital in Bayanzürkh, Ulaanbaatar, Mongolia

Coordinates: 47°55′5.1″N 106°57′59.8″E

Geography
- Location: Bayanzürkh, Ulaanbaatar, Mongolia

Organisation
- Care system: Public
- Type: Specialist

History
- Founded: 1921

The Central Military Hospital (CMH; Mongolian: Цэргийн төв эмнэлэг) is a military hospital for the Mongolian Armed Forces located in Bayanzürkh, Ulaanbaatar. It was the first scientific hospital in Mongolia. It has a capacity for 350 beds.

== History ==
=== Early years ===
It was established on August 15, 1921, at the initiative of General Damdin Sükhbaatar to provide free services to the military and the people. Established after the communist victory in the Mongolian Revolution. it was used by the Mongolian People's Army to provide professional medical assistance to regular soldiers and guerrillas. In October 1923, the government established the “Outpatient Clinic for the Sick” under the Medical Department of the Ministry of Defense, which was the beginning of Mongolia's first outpatient clinic. In 1928, a 10-person sanitary and 3-person pharmacist course was opened at the military infirmary, which was the first step in the training of Mongolia's national health personnel. The role of the Central Military Hospital was recognized by the ruling Mongolian People's Revolutionary Party, and in 1955, by the order of the Presidium of the People's Great Hural of the Mongolian People's Republic, it was awarded the highest state award, the Polar Star.

=== Later years to present times ===
The current hospital building was opened in 1976. In 1983, it was expanded to include specialized services. In 2008, it started to provide assistance for injuries caused by firearms. In 2012, it was reorganized into the General Hospital for Defense and Law Enforcement Officers. It was renamed “Military Central Hospital in 2016. On January 15, 2017, the Children's Department of the hospital was opened and serves the children of officers working in the regions.

Since 1993, the hospital's medical staff has been working annually with teams of international military doctors from foreign nations. Every year since 2010, exchange courses with international military doctors took place under the auspices of the Khaan Quest exercises. It was awarded the Order of the Red Banner of Military Merit by the decree of President Tsakhiagiin Elbegdorj on March 30, 2017.

== Activities ==
In early 2020, the hospital began the process of readying itself for the COVID-19 pandemic in Mongolia. Furthermore, the hospital emptied its 9-floor, preparing 570 beds for an influx of patients. Many repatriated Mongolians quarantined at the hospital for two weeks upon return. More than 500 face shields were donated to the hospital by the Turkish Cooperation and Coordination Agency. Donations were also made by the General Staff to the hospital.

== Structure ==
The Central Military Hospital operates the National Poison Emergency Center, Management, Staff, Hospital Unit, Polyclinic, and Background Supply Service. The hospital has surgery, trauma, internal medicine, neurology, emergency care, anesthesia, intensive care clinics and laboratories. In 1990, the “Internal Poisoning” unit was established, and 5 years later, the hospital was expanded to include the National Center for Disease Control and Prevention.
