= Ulaan Od =

Улаан Од Ulaan Od
- Type: bi-weekly
- Owner: Mongolian Armed Forces
- Awards: Order of Sukhbaatar; Order of the Red Banner
- Founded: 1923; 103 years ago
- Language: Mongolian
- Country: Mongolian People's Republic (1923-1992); Mongolia (since 1992)

Ulaan Od (Mongolian: Улаан Од, literally "Red Star") is an organ under the Mongolian Ministry of Defense, and has an official designation as the official newspaper of the Mongolian Armed Forces. According to Mongolian cosmonaut and former defense minister Jügderdemidiin Gürragchaa, "Ulaan Od newspaper is understood to have contributed to the upbringing and development of many generations of men and to the development of the media sector." It is published bi-weekly by the Mongolian Defense Ministry.

== History ==
It was founded in 1923 as part of the Mongolian People's Army. On February 4, 1949, the Red Star newspaper was awarded the Order of the Red Banner of Merit on the occasion of its 25th anniversary. There were 34 articles in 1980, 37 in 1981 and 14 in 1982. On April 14, 1988, a large article published by the newspaper questioned the death of Marshal Gelegdorjiin Demid on Soviet territory, prompting the Soviet embassy to protest to the Central Committee of the Mongolian People's Revolutionary Party.

== Editors in chief ==
- Tumendemberel Choijav (1959-1962)

== Notable employees and editors ==
- Tsakhiagiin Elbegdorj
- Togsjargalyn Gandi, Minister of Health and Sports from 2004 to 2006

== See also ==
- Krasnaya Zvezda
