= Chief of General Staff (Mongolia) =

Head of the Mongolian armed forces

Chief of the General Staff the Armed Forces of Mongolia
- Монгол Улсын Зэвсэгт хүчний жанжин штабын дарга
- Emblem of the General staff of Mongolian Armed forces
- Incumbent; Major General Sünreviin Ganbyamba since 3 November 2022
- Ministry of Defence
- Member of: General Staff of the Mongolian Armed Forces
- Reports to: Minister of Defence
- Residence: Ulaanbaatar, Mongolia
- Seat: Office of the General Staff (16th Street, Bayanzurkh District, Ulaanbaatar)
- Appointer: President of Mongolia (with consent of the State Great Khural)
- Precursor: Chief of the General Staff of the Mongolian People's Army
- Formation: 1992 (current form)
- Deputy: First Deputy Chief of the General Staff
- Website: gsmaf.gov.mn

The Chief of the General Staff of the Mongolian Armed Forces (Mongolian: Монгол Улсын Зэвсэгт хүчний жанжин штабын дарга, romanized: Mongol Ulsyn Zevsegt khüchnii janjin shtabyn darga) is the highest-ranking professional military leader in the Mongolian Armed Forces. The Chief of the General Staff carries out his duties under the governance of the Commander-in-Chief and serves as the principal advisor to them on military affairs. They are responsible for the implementation of operational orders and directives to maintain the combat readiness of the armed forces in peacetime. In wartime, the chief directs the military in accordance with the commander-in-chief.

From 1921–1992, the post was referred to as the Chief of the General Staff of the People's Army (Mongolian: Ардын цэргийн жанжин штабын дарга, romanized: Ardyn tsergiin janjin shtabyn darga).

== List of Chiefs ==
=== Mongolian People's Republic (1921–1992) ===
No.	Portrait	Name (born–died)	Term of office			Ref.
No.	Portrait	Name (born–died)	Took office	Left office	Time in office	Ref.
1	Lyatte	Lyatte	March 1921	April 1921	1 month	
2	P. I. Litvintsev	P. I. Litvintsev	April 1921	September 1921	5 months	
3	Vladimir Khuva	Vladimir Khuva	September 1921	September 1922	1 year	
4	S. I. Popov	S. I. Popov	17 September 1922	August 1923	0 years	
5		D. I. Kochich	25 August 1923	1924	0–1 years	
?	Jamsrang Tseren(Жамсрангийн Цэрэн)	General; Jamsrang Tseren (Жамсрангийн Цэрэн)	July 1939	1940	0–1 years	
?	Sanjiin Bataa(Санжийн Батаа)	Colonel General; Sanjiin Bataa (Санжийн Батаа) (1915–1982)	1952	20 November 1955	3–4 years	
?	Zhamyangiyn Lhagvasuren(Жамьянгийн Лхагвасурэн)	Lieutenant General; Zhamyangiyn Lhagvasuren (Жамьянгийн Лхагвасурэн)	20 November 1955	1 May 1956	5 months	
?	Dorjiin Gombojav	Colonel general Dorjiin Gombojav	1959	1965	4–5 years	
?	Butochiyn Tsog	Colonel general Butochiyn Tsog (1912–1989)	1965	1970	4–5 years	
?	Jamsrangijn Jondon	Colonel general Jamsrangijn Jondon (1923–1992)	1971	1974	2–3 years	
?	Purevdorj Choiront [mn]	Lieutenant general Purevdorj Choiront (1933–2003)	1974	1986	11–12 years	
?	Shagalyn Jadambaa	Lieutenant general Shagalyn Jadambaa (born 1940)	1986	October 1990	4 years	

=== Mongolia (1990–present) ===
No.	Picture	Chief of General Staff	Took office	Left office	Time in office	Ref.
1	Rashmaagiin Gavaa(Рашмаагийн Гаваа)	Major General; Rashmaagiin Gavaa (Рашмаагийн Гаваа)	October 1990	August 1996	5 years, 10 months	
2	Gombosürengiin Damdinsüren(Гомбосүрэнгийн Дамдинсүрэн)	Lieutenant General; Gombosürengiin Damdinsüren (Гомбосүрэнгийн Дамдинсүрэн)	August 1996	August 1998	2 years	–
3	Tserenbaljidyn Dashzeveg(Цэрэнбалжидын Дашзэвэг)	Lieutenant General; Tserenbaljidyn Dashzeveg (Цэрэнбалжидын Дашзэвэг)	August 1998	11 October 2002	4 years, 2 months	
4	Tsevegsürengiin Togoo(Цэвэгсүрэнгийн Тогоо)	Lieutenant General; Tsevegsürengiin Togoo (Цэвэгсүрэнгийн Тогоо)	11 October 2002	14 June 2009	6 years, 8 months	
5	Tserendejidiin Byambajav(Цэрэндэжидийн Бямбажав)	Lieutenant General; Tserendejidiin Byambajav (Цэрэндэжидийн Бямбажав)	14 June 2009	19 June 2015	6 years	
6	Dulamsürengiin Davaa(Дуламсүрэнгийн Даваа)	Lieutenant General; Dulamsürengiin Davaa (Дуламсүрэнгийн Даваа)	19 June 2015	14 November 2018	3 years, 4 months	
7	Radnaabazariin Sukhbat(Раднаабазарын Сүхбат)	Major General; Radnaabazariin Sukhbat (Раднаабазарын Сүхбат)	14 November 2018	22 March 2019	4 months	–
8	Ayushiin Ganbat(Аюушийн Ганбат)	Major General; Ayushiin Ganbat (Аюушийн Ганбат)	22 March 2019	4 October 2019	6 months	
9	Dovchinsurengiin Ganzorig(Довчинсүрэнгийн Ганзориг)	Lieutenant General; Dovchinsurengiin Ganzorig (Довчинсүрэнгийн Ганзориг)	4 October 2019	3 November 2022	3 years	
10	Sunreviin Ganbyamba(Сүнрэвийн Ганбямба)	Lieutenant General; Sunreviin Ganbyamba (Сүнрэвийн Ганбямба) (born 1975)	3 November 2022	Incumbent	3 years, 10 months	
