= 032 Military Unit =

Military unit in Mongolia

032nd Military Unit
- Зэвсэгт хүчний 032 дугаар анги
- Active: 1924–present
- Country: Mongolia (1924–92); Mongolia (1992–present)
- Allegiance: President of Mongolia
- Branch: Mongolian Armed Forces
- Type: Infantry Unit
- Role: Memorial affairs, ceremonies and special events (one honor guard); Military security (two companies)
- Garrison/HQ: Ulaanbaatar
- Decorations: Order of the Red Banner for Military Valor

Commanders
- Notable commanders: Colonel Jamsrangiin Yondon

The 032 Separate Commandant's Battalion named after Colonel General Jamsrangiin Yondon, known simply as the 032 Military Unit (Mongolian: Зэвсэгт хүчний 032 дугаар анги), is a military unit of the Armed Forces of Mongolia. The unit takes part in the peacetime protection of the capital, with its main tasks being law enforcement and the continuous organization of daily activities, military supplies, and services.

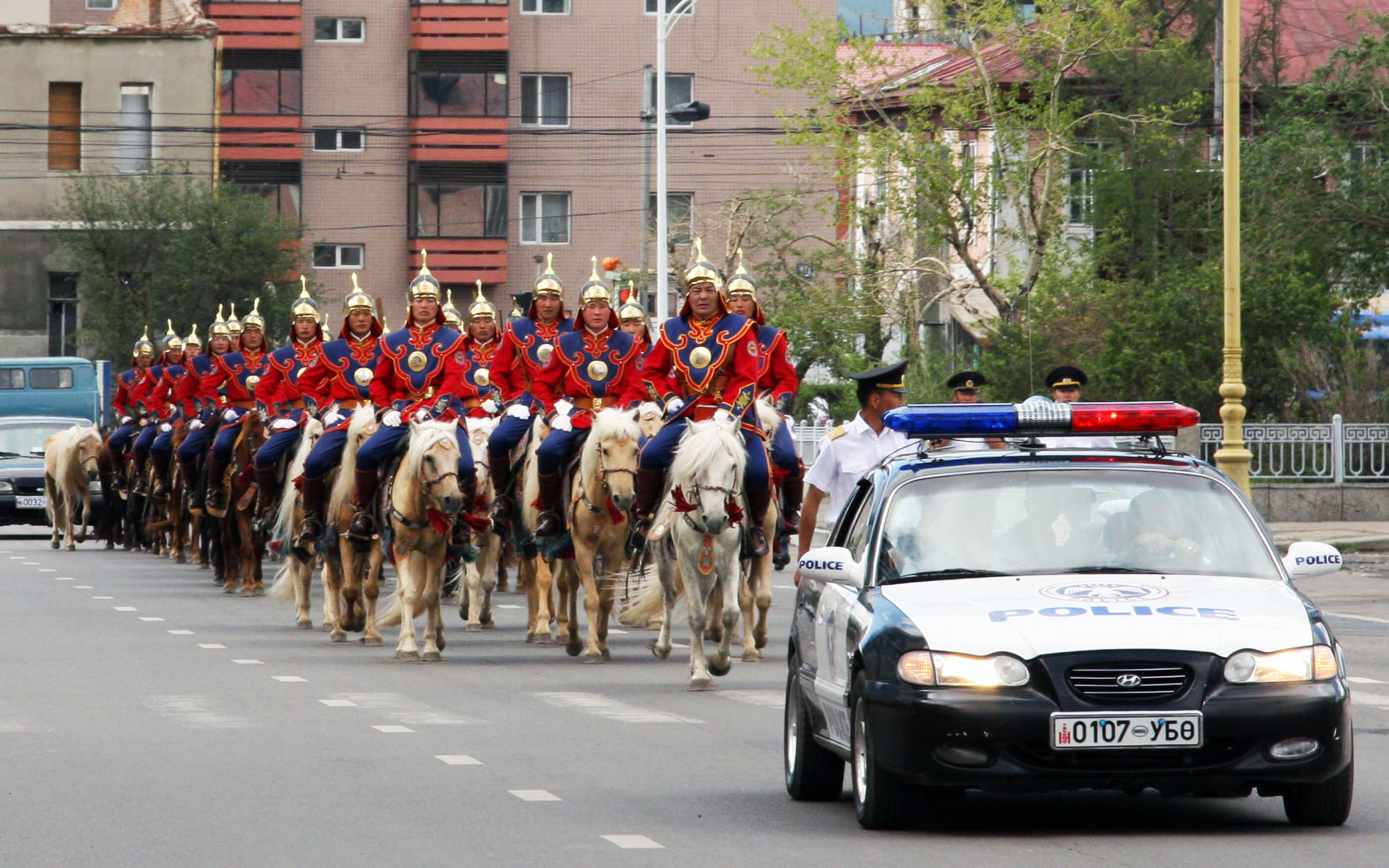
A mounted cavalry unit from the state honor guard being escorted by local police during a procession to Naadam

== History ==
It was formed in 1924, after the Mongolian People's Republic was established following the 1921 People's Revolution. It was named the Ulaanbaatar City Commandant. The unit in its current form was established on 16 August 1955 in accordance with directive No. 057 of Lieutenant General Sanjiin Bataa from the Mongolian People's Army.

On its golden jubilee in 1974, it was awarded the Order of Merit by the People's Great Khural.

In 2013, it was the winner of an inter-military contest called "Mongolia Military Glory". On 2 October 2019, President Khaltmaagiin Battulga issued a decree awarding the unit with the Order of the Red Banner for Military Valor. The award was presented by the Chief of the Presidential Office, who then delivered a welcoming speech on behalf of Battulga.

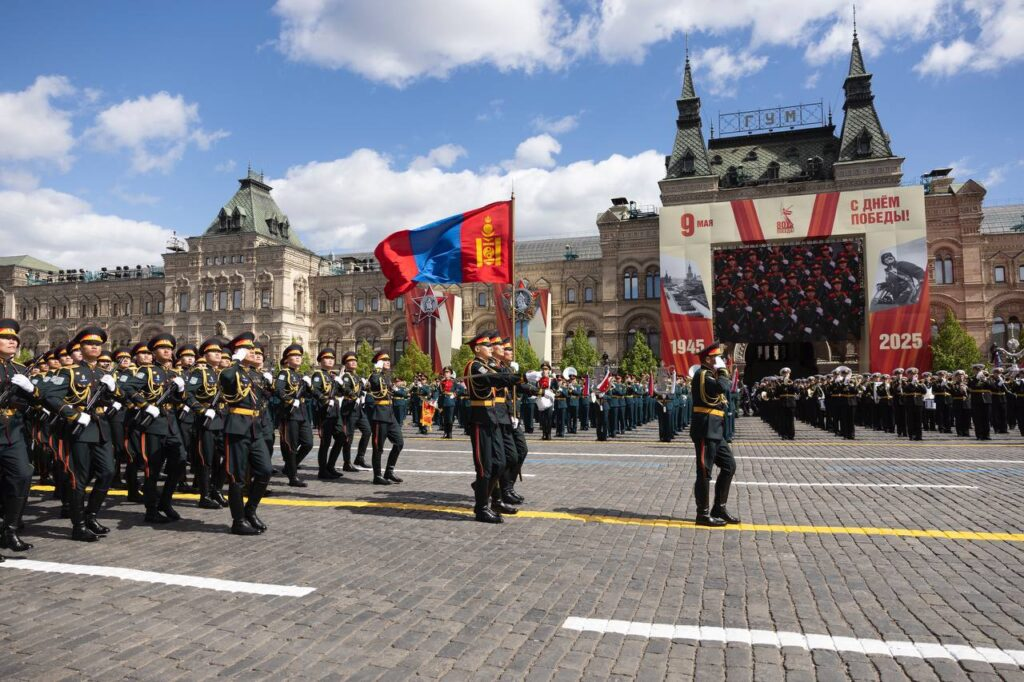
The 032nd Military Unit at the 2025 Moscow Victory Day Parade

In 2020, T.Ganbold, a senior lieutenant in the unit, served as the flag bearer for the Mongolian contingent during the 2020 Moscow Victory Day Parade on Red Square.

In 2025, the military unit participated in the 80th Victory Day Parade in Moscow, where over 1,000 troops from 13 foreign countries took part. The military contingent, led by unit commander Lieutenant Colonel E. Bilegsaikhan, consisted of 28 officers, 50 non-commissioned officers, and 2 contracted military servicemen.

== Component units ==
The composition of the battalion includes the following units:

- Mongolian State Honor Guard
- Military Police company
- Special Forces company

=== Mongolian State Honor Guard ===
The honor guard company is involved in both the welcoming and seeing off of foreign states during their official visits to Mongolia, which is among a large number of other diverse events.

=== Military police and Special forces ===
The military police and special forces companies are entrusted with protecting strategic facilities and ensuring public safety in the capital.

== See also ==
- 154th Preobrazhensky Independent Commandant's Regiment
- Kremlin Regiment
- Independent Presidential Regiment (Ukraine)
- Pyongyang Defense Command
