= Bayandalai, Ömnögovi =

District in Ömnögovi Province, Mongolia

Coordinates: 43°28′01″N 103°30′45″E

Bayandalai District Баяндалай сум ᠪᠠᠶ᠋ᠠᠨ ᠳᠠᠯᠠᠢ ᠰᠤᠮᠤ
- District
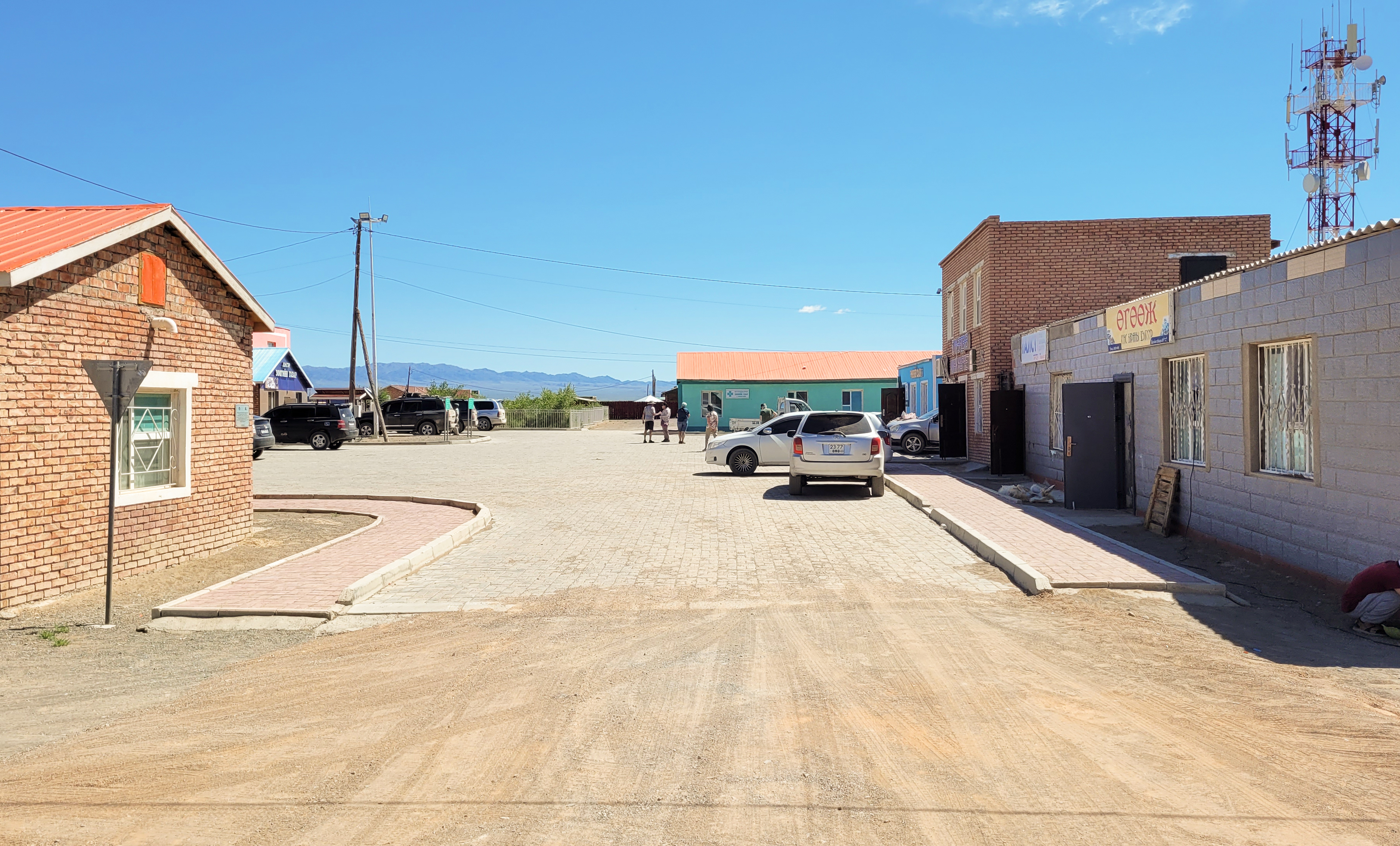

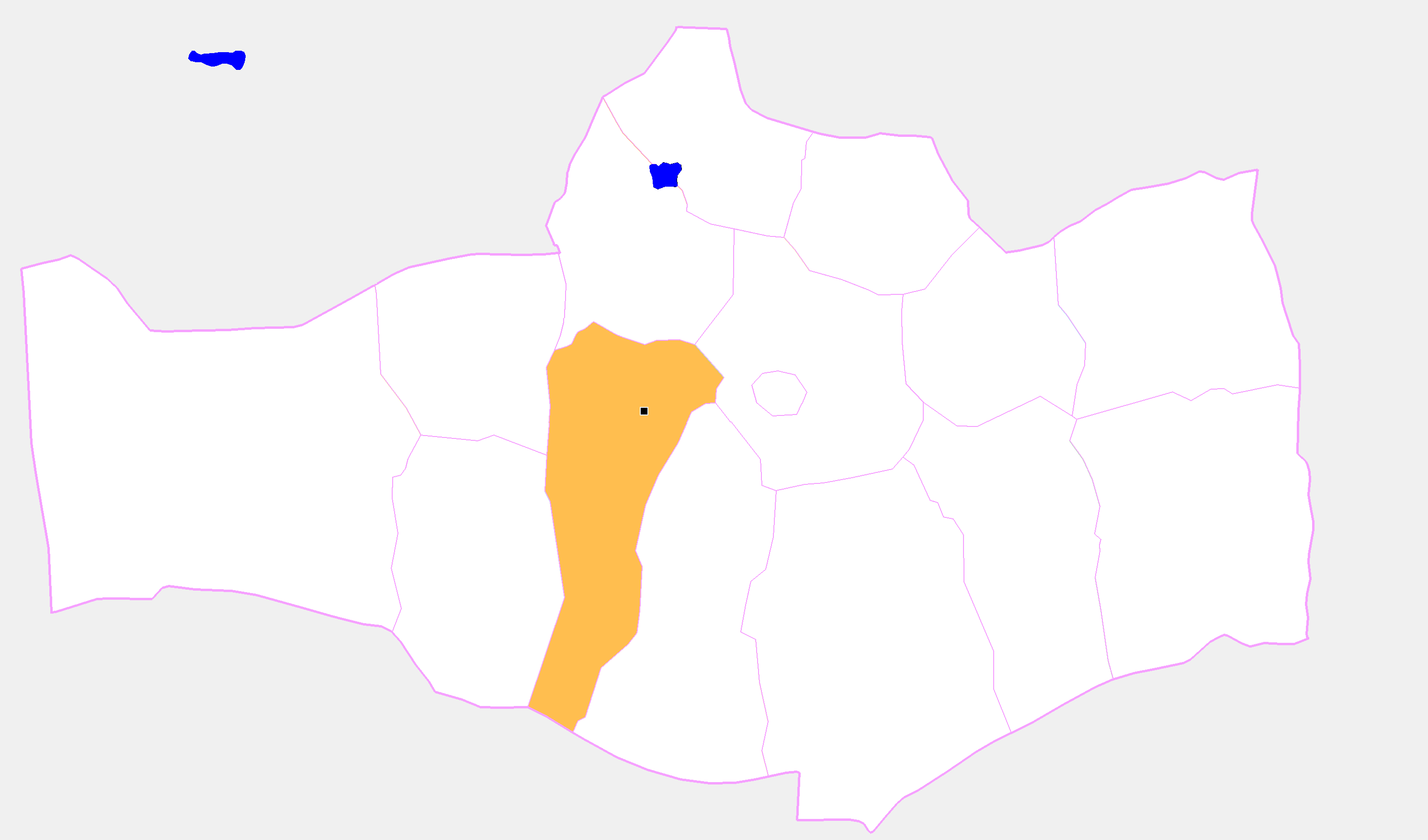
- Bayandalai District in Ömnögovi Province
- Country: Mongolia
- Province: Ömnögovi Province

Area
  - Total: 10,751 km^{2} (4,151 sq mi)
- Time zone: UTC+8 (UTC + 8)

Bayandalai (Mongolian: Баяндалай, Rich ocean) is a sum (district) of Ömnögovi Province in southern Mongolia. In 2009, its population was 2,316.

== Administrative divisions ==
The district is divided into three bags, which are:

- Bayan
- Naran
- Tukhum
