= Luvsannorovyn Erdenechimeg =

Mongolian ethnomusicologist

- Лувсанноровын Эрдэнэчимэг
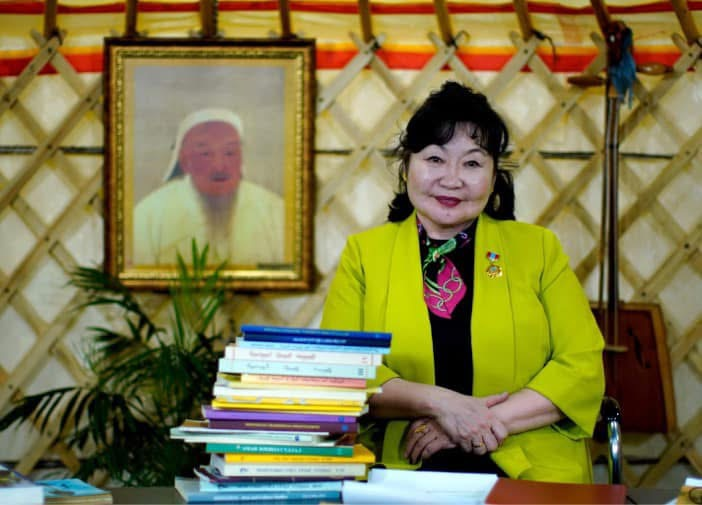
- Born: 1957 (age 68–69); Ulaanbaatar

Erdenechimeg Luvsannorov (Mongolian: Лувсанноровын Эрдэнэчимэг; born 1957) is an ethnomusicologist and researcher not to be confused with a senate member of the same name in Mongolia.

== Biography ==
Erdenechimeg was born in Ulaanbaatar, Mongolia. She descends from a family who studied in the fields of linguistics and folklore. Her research focus is ancient Asian music theory and history. Erdenechimeg was a visiting scholar at the Indiana University Department of Central Eurasian Studies from 2005 to 2008.

== Education ==
Erdenechimeg earned her bachelor's degree in Music from the Musical College in Ulaanbaatar, Mongolia in 1978. Her Bachelor's and Master's Degree's were earned at the Tchaikovsky Conservatory (with Dr. Pr. Yuri Nikolaevich Kholopov) in Moscow, Russia from 1980 to 1986. She studied Musicology at the Shanghai Conservatory (with Pr. Chen Ying Shi) from 1997 to 1999. Erdenechimeg earned two doctorate degrees, with the first dissertation titled The Consonant and Dissonant Sounds of the Harmony of the Horse-headed Fiddle at the Mongolian National University of Art in 1993 and the second, titled The Harmony of the Mongolian Meditation Guru Song, at the Mongolian Academy of Sciences in 2000. Since 2000, Erdenechimeg has been an Associate Professor in the Department of Music Theory of the Mongolian National University of Art.

== Publications ==
Erdenechimeg has written over 47 musicological and ethno-musicological books in Mongolian, several of which are also published in Chinese, Russian and English. Her book Eighteen Songs of a Nomad Flute is the first translation and commentary that translates ancient Chinese into Mongolian. This book was published in 2002 and again in 2003 after much popularity. It was eventually published in Chinese, Mongolian, and English including Erdenechimeg's focus on the interrelated aspects of the poem with instrumental music, song, art, and drama. The Mongolian composer Tsogzolyn Natsagdorj worked on an opera of this poem as a result of this book.

Erdenechimeg has also taught and presented educational courses on early Asian and European music, its folklore, literature, theory, and history. In addition, she has given countless international presentations and has written and published more than 300 scientific articles as a result of her research.

1. L. Erdenechimeg (1994), “The traditional melody of the horse-headed fiddle” 1994, UB; Mongolia, Publication by: “Shuvuun saaral” publishing company.
2. L. Erdenechimeg (1996), “The wedding songs of the Buriat minorities” 1995, UB; Mongolia, Publication by: “Choijil” publishing company; Gov Blg 20A, (Hevlelted 1996-5-16,297x210/32) OCLC 244111679
3. L. Erdenechimeg (1996), “The collection of Guru Songs” 1996, UB, Mongolia, Publication by: “Shuvuun saaral” publishing company.
4. L. Erdenechimeg (2001), “The sounds harmony of the meditation Guru Songs’ 2001, UB, Publication by: “Intersperses” publishing company; ISBN 978-99929-2-127-2.
5. L. Erdenechimeg (2002), “The Princess a Tsai Wen Ji’s eighteen songs of a nomadic flute” 2003, UB; Publication by: “Edmon” publishing company; “Admon” Publishing Company, 2002, (21xx), UB, Mongolia, ISBN 978-99929-0-127-4.
6. L. Erdenechimeg (2003), The yang and ying twelve microtones from the horse fiddle" 2003, UB, Mongolia, Publication by: “Sod press” Publishing Company; (10.1xx), 176x250, ISBN 978-99929-56-87-8.
7. L. Erdenechimeg (2004), ”Western composers of the XXth century” 2004, UB, Mongolia, Publication by: “Sukhbaatar” Publishing Company; OCLC 244015394

== Professional societies ==
Erdenechimeg is a member of the Mongolian Composers Union (1997), the International Nomadic Institute (2000) and the Chinese Traditional Musical Association (2002).

== Awards and distinctions ==
- "Top Writer of the Year" from Il Tovchoo (Open Chronicle) newspaper (1992)
- Korean Youth Federation Award (1994)
- Mongolian University Consortium Award (1995)
- Distinguished Cultural Worker Award (1996)
- Mongolian Composer's Union Award (1997)
- An award from the Federation of American Mongolians in 1997 for best presentation in the international conference
- The Mongolian Science Academy Award (2002)
- Two awards from the British Buddhist Association (2002 and 2003)
- The "Altan Gadas" (Order of the Polar Star) medal from the government of Mongolia (2004)
- President of the Mongolian Wind Instrument Association (2003), the Mongolian International Musicological Association (2004), the International Traditional Musicological Association (2004) and Mongolian Society at Indiana University (2005)
