= Jarantyn Avkhia =

Mongolian politician and military figure (1923-1992)

Jarantyn Avkhia Жарантайн Авхиа

Minister of Defense of the Mongolian People's Republic
- In office 1978–1982
- Preceded by: Batyn Dorj
- Succeeded by: Jamsrangijn Jondon

Personal details
- Born: 1923
- Died: 1992 (aged 68–69)
- Party: Mongolian People's Party

Jarantyn Avkhia (Mongolian: Жарантайн Авхиа; 1923-1992) was a Mongolian politician and military figure who served as Minister of Defense of the Mongolian People's Republic from 1978 to 1982. Prior to that he served as Prosecutor General.
