= Volgograd Honour Guard =

Ceremonial unit of the Russian armed forces

Volgograd Honour Guard Russian: Рота почётного караула Волгограда
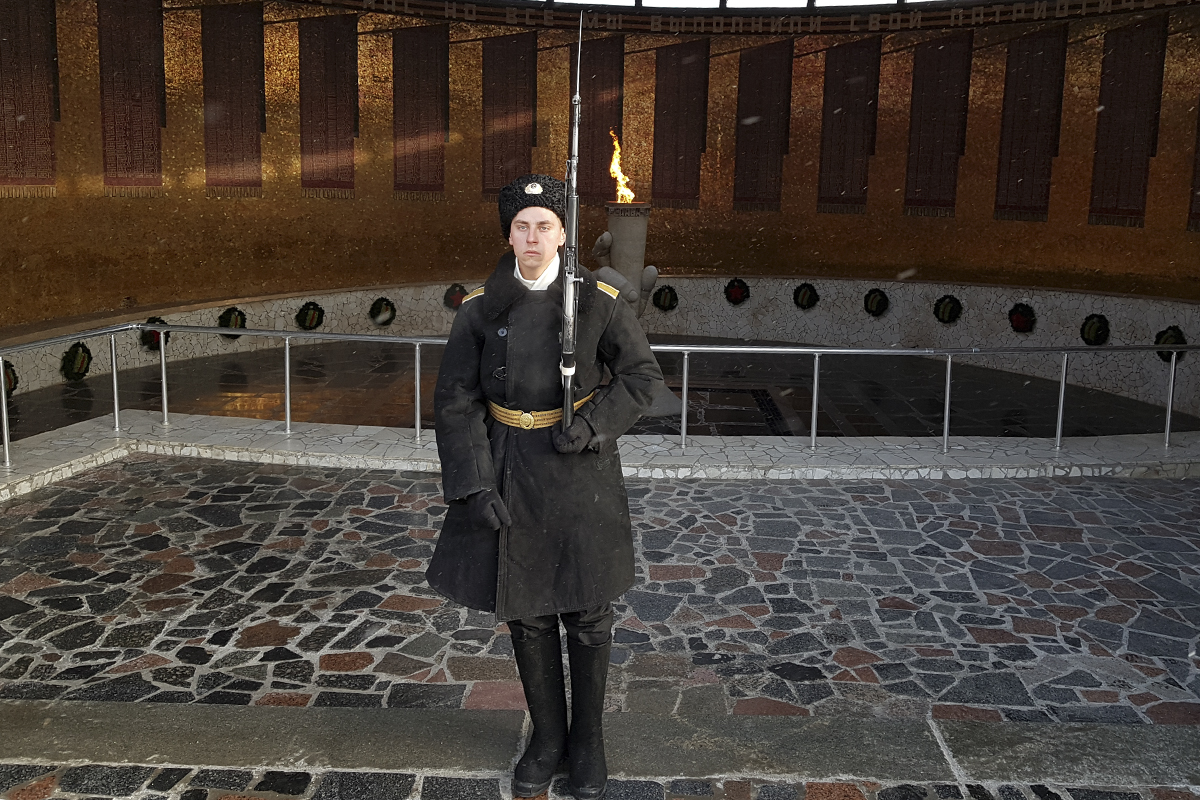
- A soldier of the company
- Active: 29 January 1968; 58 years ago
- Country: Russia
- Branch: Russian Armed Forces
- Role: Memorial affairs, ceremonies and special events
- Size: 100
- Part of: 20th Guards Motor Rifle Brigade
- Garrison/HQ: Volgograd
- Nickname: Silent Drill Platoon
- Anniversaries: January 28

Commanders
- Current commander: Major Igor Danilov

The Volgograd Honour Guard (Russian: Рота почётного караула Волгограда), officially known as the Honour Guard Company of the 20th Separate Guards Motor Rifle Brigade (Russian: Рота почётного караула 20-й отдельной гвардейской мотострелковой бригады) is a ceremonial guard unit of the Russian Armed Forces that is subordinate to the 20th Guards Motor Rifle Brigade of the Southern Military District. Its main task is to guard the Mamayev Kurgan Memorial Complex from 9 AM to 8 PM and to participate in the escorting of special guests to Volgograd. In addition, the personnel of the company take part in commemorations and events held in the Southern Military District. All 100 members of the company have to be at least 180 cm (5 ft 11 in). The company uses uniforms from the 154th Preobrazhensky Independent Commandant's Regiment, though not directly associated with it.

From its formation on January 29, 1968, to its transfer to the 20th Guards Motor Rifle Brigade on December 1, 2010, the company was designated as the 46th Separate Honour Guard Company and directly subordinate to the district headquarters.

== Gallery ==
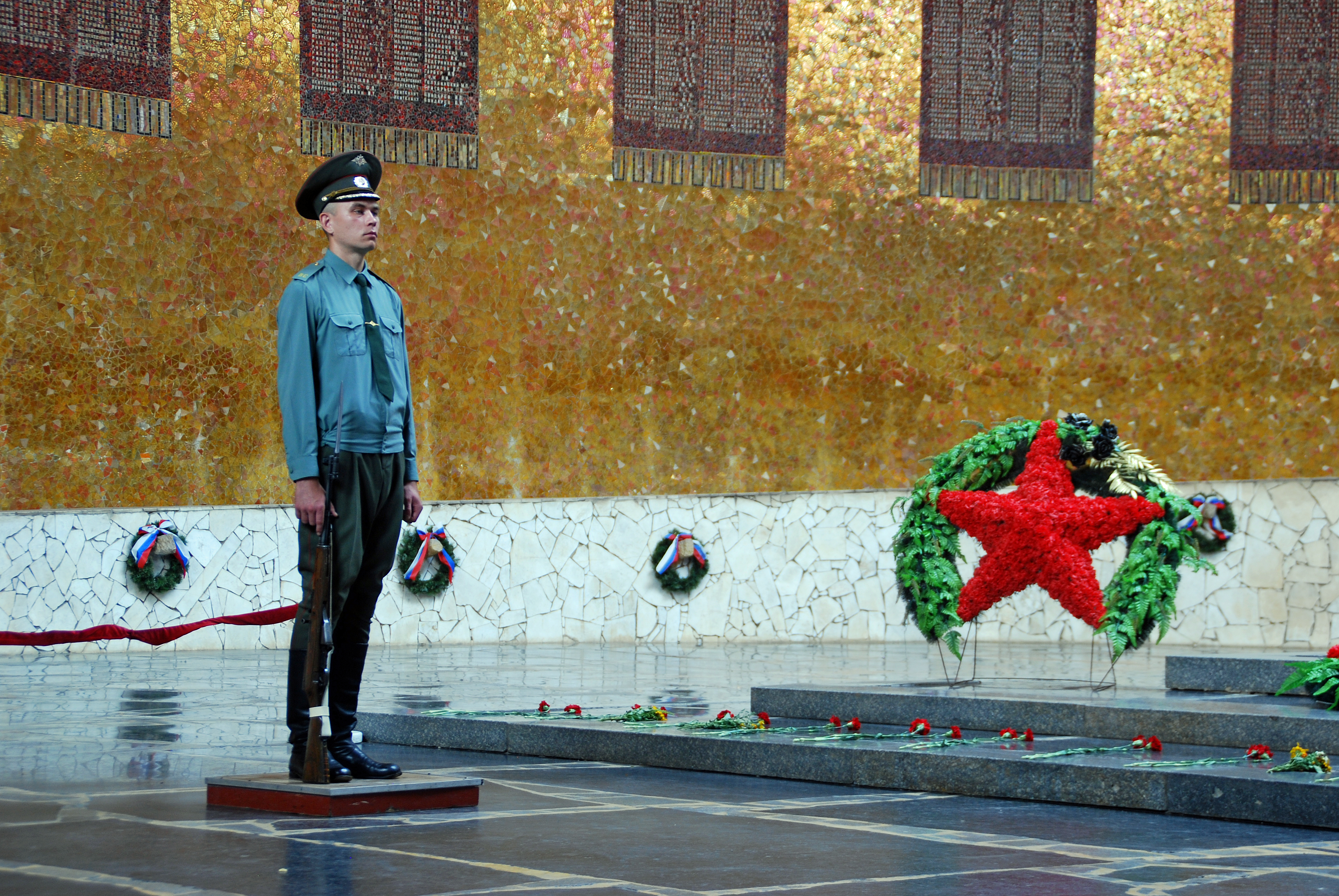
The unit's summer uniform.

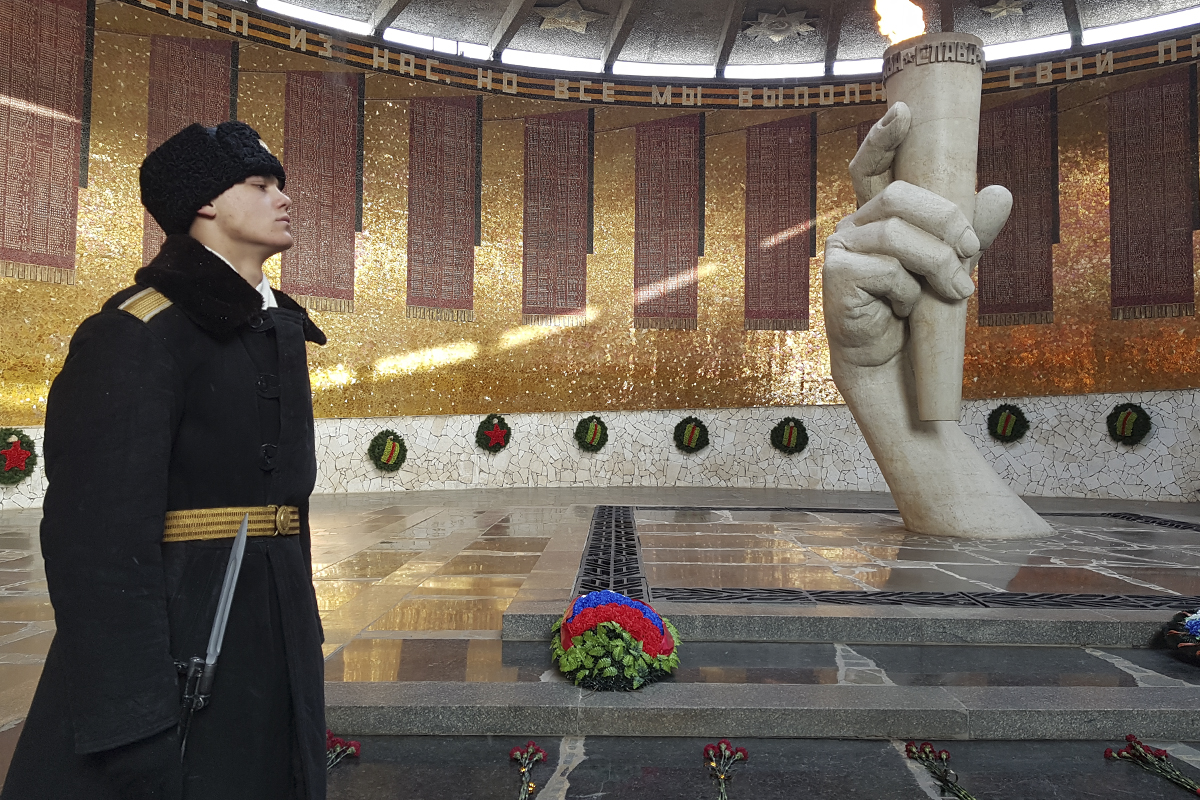
The unit's winter uniform.

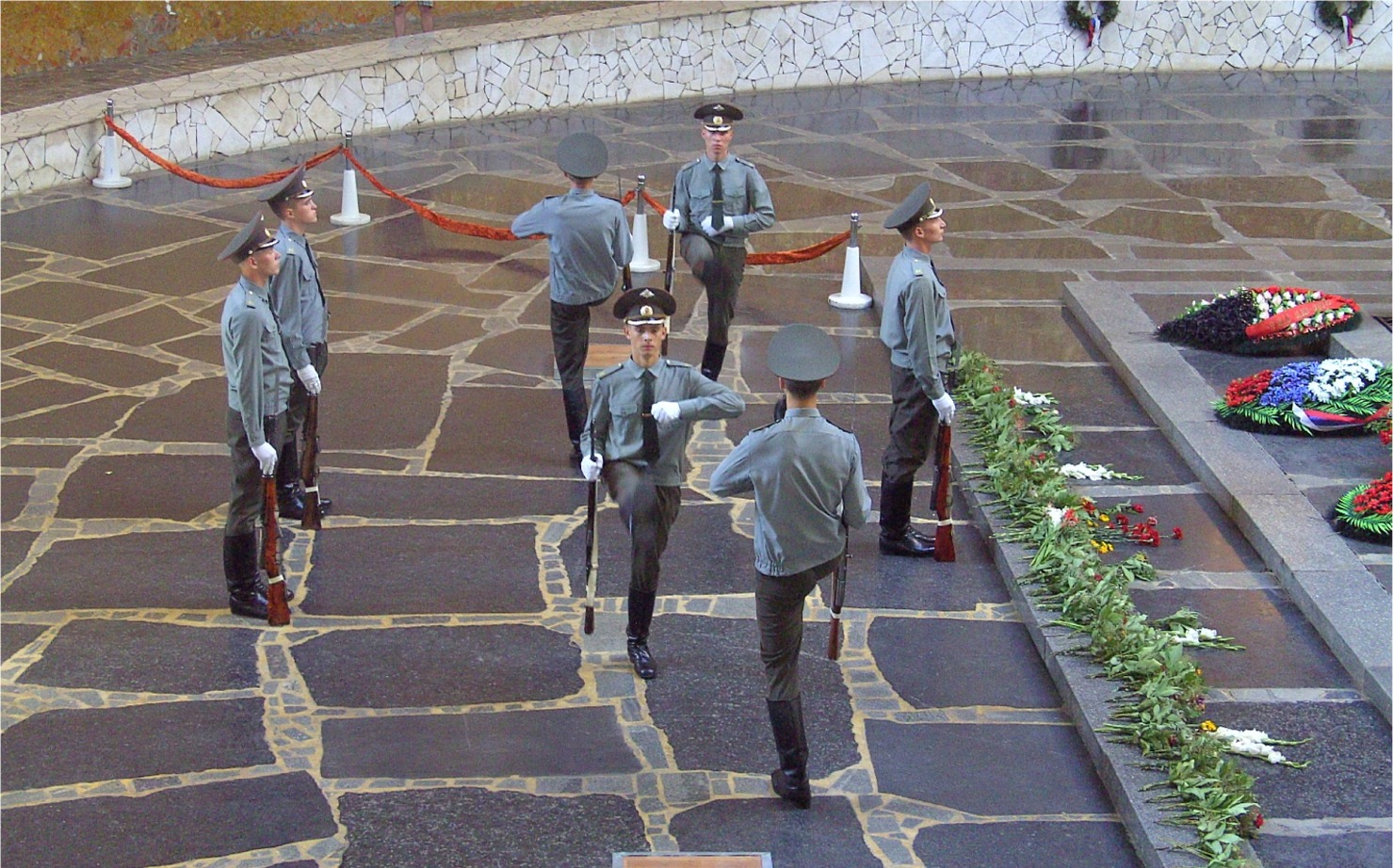
The changing of the guards in the summer uniform

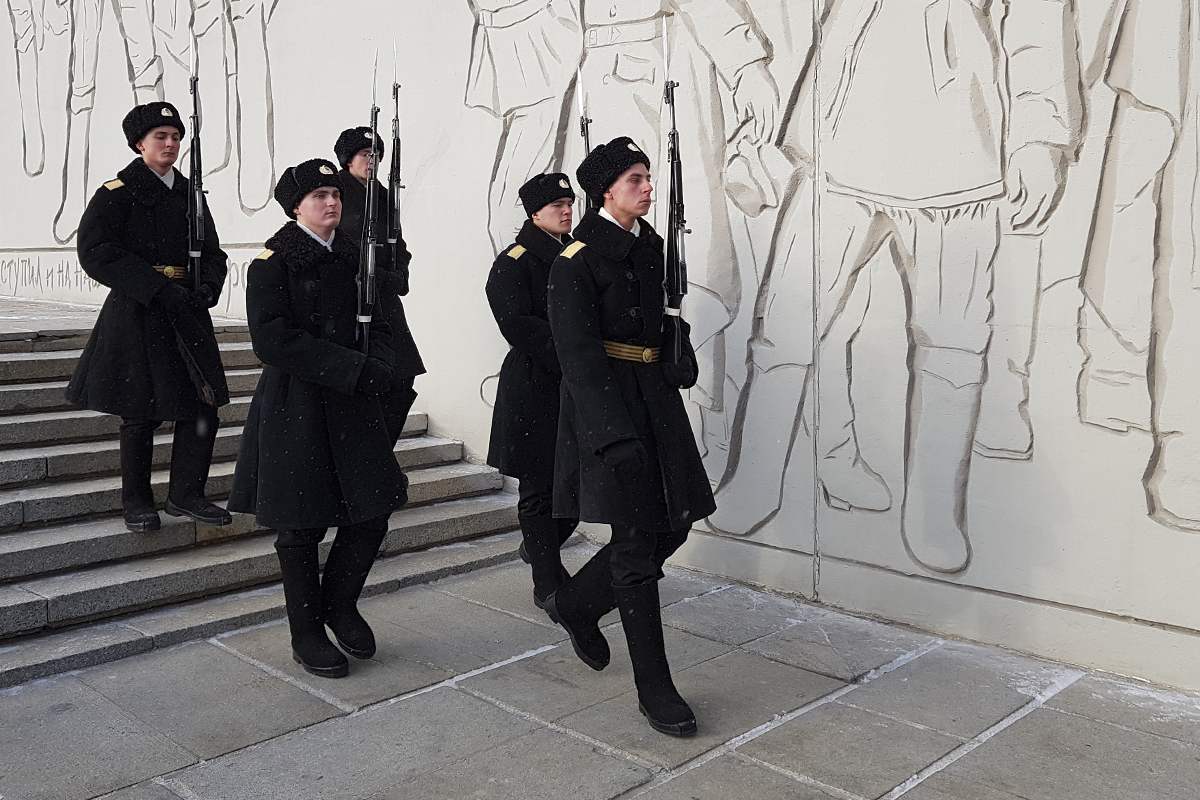
The changing of the guards in the winter uniform

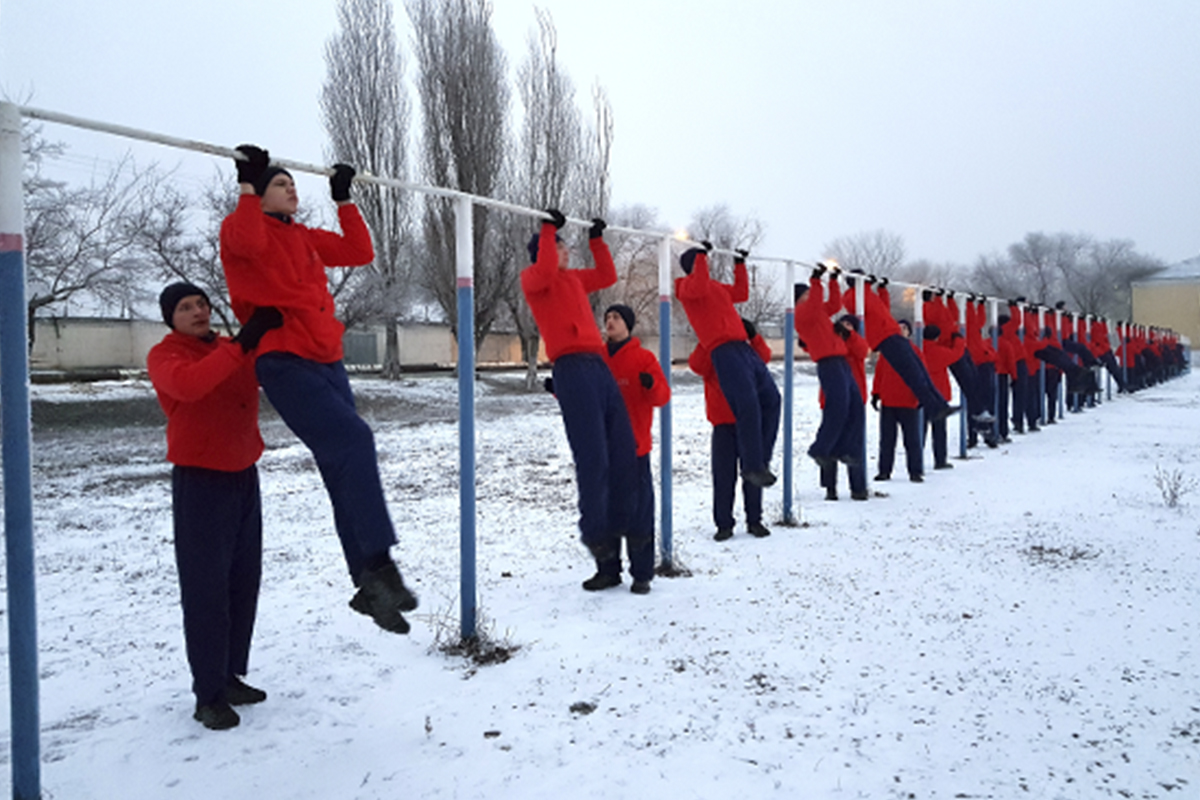
The soldiers training

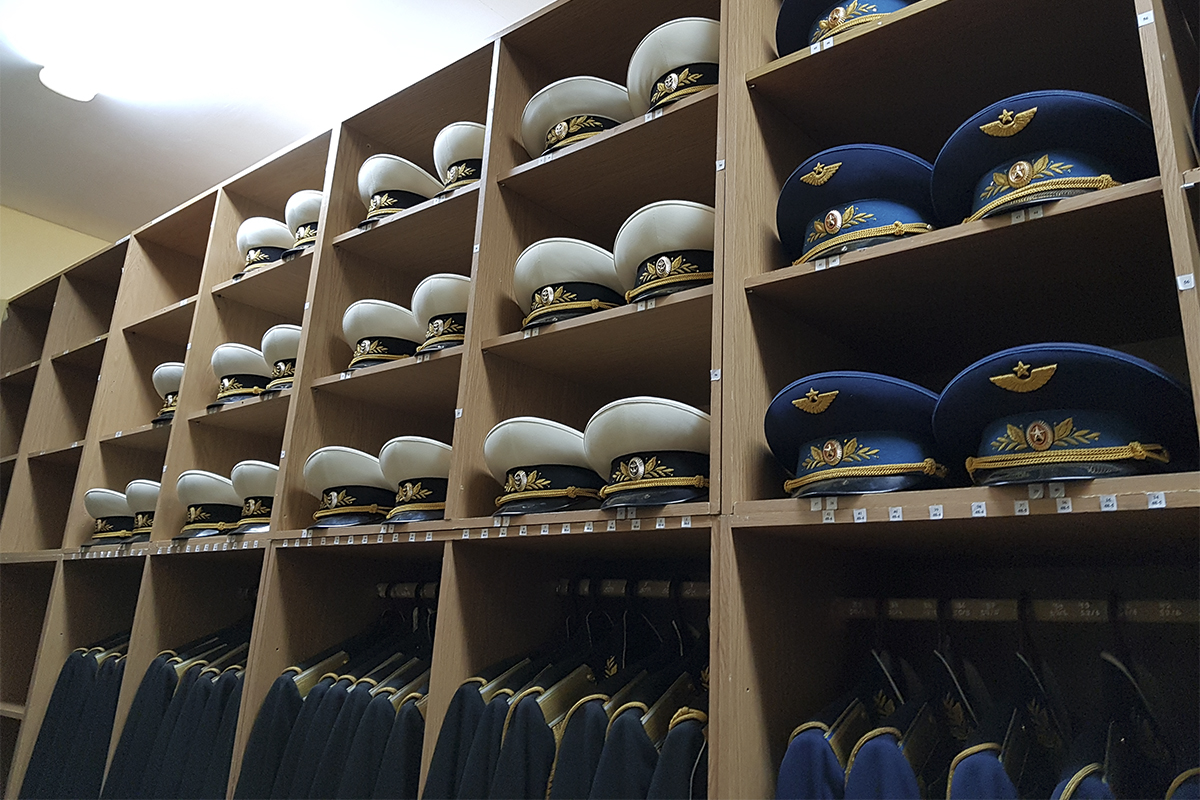
The unit's uniform collection

== See also ==
- 154th Preobrazhensky Independent Commandant's Regiment
- Kremlin Regiment
- Guard of honour
