= General Staff of the Mongolian Armed Forces =

- Монгол Улсын Зэвсэгт хүчний Жанжин штаб
- Emblem of the General Staff

- Flag of the General Staff

Agency overview
- Formed: 1992 (current form)
- Preceding agency: General Staff of the Armed Forces of the Mongolian People's Republic
- Headquarters: Peace avenue 51, Bayanzürkh, Ulaanbaatar
- Minister responsible: Member of Parliament, Member of Cabinet and Minister of Defense, Mr Byambatsogt Sandar, Minister for Defense
- Agency executives: Lieutenant General Sünreviin Ganbyamba, Chief of the General Staff of the Armed Forces; Brigadier General Jargalsaikhany Ösökhbayar, First Deputy Chief of the General Staff; Brigadier General Baljidiin Baatar, Deputy Chief of the General Staff
- Website: www.gsmaf.gov.mn

The General Staff of the Armed Forces of Mongolia (Mongolian: Зэвсэгт хүчний жанжин штаб) is a permanent military body in Mongolia. According to the Law on the Armed forces, General Staff is the professional managing body and the headquarters for the Mongolian Armed Forces and operates independently from the Ministry of Defense, its parent body. It serves as the highest decision making body in the armed forces outside of the government controlled defense ministry and provides the armed forces with integrated military management as well as participates in the development of defense policy and the planning and organizing of the military. It also informs and consults with the National Security Council on defense matters. It is led by the Chief of the General Staff who is the professional head of the military, being the equivalent to the American Chairman of the Joint Chiefs of Staff and the Russian Chief of the General Staff. The current Chief of the General Staff is Lieutenant General Ganbyamba Sunrev. The headquarters of the General Staff is located in Ulaanbaatar.

== History ==
In March 1921, the Mongolian People's Party Military Administration Department was established with five members and was renamed the "Headquarters". A Military Council also existed, functioning with a General Staff that was exclusively led by Soviet specialists. The source of the modern General Staff was the People's General Staff, established in 1921. It became the General Staff of the Mongolian People's Revolutionary Army in 1924, and was renamed in 1955 to the General Staff of the Mongolian People's Army. It was renamed before it was finally given the named of General Staff of the Armed Forces in January 1980. After the Mongolian Revolution of 1990, the General Staff became disassociated with the MPA in July 1991, and has since June 2002 been operating under its current name. From 1956 to 1990, the General Staff played a key role in strengthening the State Defense Forces and expanding the Armed Forces. organized short-term staffing.

== Structure ==
The GSMAF consists of 12 directorates and departments, the Land Forces Command, the Air Force Command, The Special Forces Command, Cyber Security Command and Military Construction Engineering Authority. The following are departments that make up the general staff main body:

- Policy and Strategic Planning Directorate
- Operational Directorate
- Material Equipment and Supply Management Directorate
  - Military Medical Service
    - Central Military Hospital
- Military Intelligence Directorate
- Command and Communication-Information Security Directorate
  - Cyber Security Center of the Mongolian Armed Forces
- Peace Support Operations and Military Cooperations Department
- General Inspectorate

These departments are led by directors (in the lattermost case a Chief Inspector General) who supervise and manage these departments. These positions are collectively part of the General Staff leadership. The Military Intelligence Directorate is directly subordinated to the Office of the Prime Minister of Mongolia. The Operational Directorate descends from the Political Department of the Ministry of Defense of the MPA (established on May 16, 1921). In the early 2000s, the Peacekeeping Operations Office (PKOO) of the General Staff was founded to operate peacekeeping units in the country.

== Separate assets ==
Separately, the First Deputy Chief of Staff is concurrent to the post of Chief of the Ulaanbaatar Garrison (Улаанбаатар гарнизоны дарга), and is responsible for military discipline, parades, ceremonies, and the reception of foreign guests.

== Current leaders ==
- Chief of the General Staff – Lt Gen Sunreviin Ganbyamba
- First Deputy Chief of the General Staff – Br.Gen Jargalkhaihanii Usukhbayar
- Deputy Chief of the General Staff – Br. Gen Baljidiin Baatar

== See also ==
- Chief of the General Staff
- General Staff of the Armed Forces of the Russian Federation
- Joint Staff Department of the Central Military Commission
- Military Band of the General Staff of the Armed Forces of Mongolia
