= Order of Sukhbaatar =

State decoration of Mongolia

Order of Sukhbaatar Сүхбаатарын одон
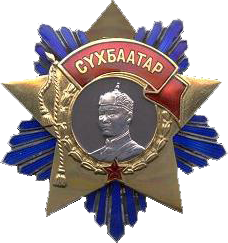
- Breast star of the Order

Awarded by the President of Mongolia
- Type: Order
- Established: 16 May 1941
- Eligibility: Mongolian citizens and foreign nationals
- Awarded for: "special services to defenses, economic and cultural construction of the People's Republic of Mongolia, and also for acts of heroism in the struggle against external and internal enemies"
- Status: Still awarded
- Mongolian People's Republic (1941–92); Mongolia (since 1992)
- Grades: One

The Order of Sukhbaatar (or Order of Suche Bator, Mongolian: Сүхбаатарын одон, romanized: Sükhbaataryn odon) is a state decoration of Mongolia, originally instituted on 16 May 1941 (however, some sources date this to 27 September 1945). It is awarded to Mongolians and foreigners "for special services to defenses, economic and cultural construction of the Mongolian People's Republic, and also for acts of heroism in the struggle against external and internal enemies". It was named after the Mongolian national hero, Damdin Sükhbaatar.

It is still conferred today and was the highest state order from 1992 to 2005 (when it was surpassed by the Order of Chinggis Khaan), awarded by the decree of the President of Mongolia.

== Order description ==
This medal is worn on the left side of the brooch before or at the beginning of other medals. He is also awarded the title of Hero of Mongolia and Hero of Labor.

Order bar before 1961	Order bar after 1961

The number of awards with the order, according to Herfurt, is 1700. Recipients of the Order received a number of civic privileges. Those awarded with the order have the right to free visits to museums, exhibitions, lectures, reports and all other cultural and social events. A payment of money is made by the State Bank.

== Records in number of times awarded ==
- Marshal Yumjaagiin Tsedenbal (6 times)
- Colonel General Butochiyn Tsog (5 times)
- Marshal Khorloogiin Choibalsan (3 times)
- Marshal Georgy Zhukov (3 times)

== Recipients ==
=== People ===
- Sergey Akhromeyev
- Anatoly Alexandrov (physicist)
- Natsagiin Bagabandi
- Ivan Bagramyan
- Pavel Batitsky
- Jambyn Batmönkh
- Pavel Batov
- Pavel Belyayev
- Lavrentiy Beria
- Filipp Bobkov
- Leonid Brezhnev
- Josip Broz Tito
- Gonchigiin Bumtsend
- Vasily Chuikov
- Vladimir Dolgikh
- Vladimir Dzhanibekov
- Ivan Fedyuninsky
- Maidarjavyn Ganzorig
- Andrei Getman
- Viktor Gorbatko
- Sergey Gorshkov
- Jügderdemidiin Gürragchaa
- Ho Chi Minh
- Gustáv Husák
- Alexi Ivanov
- Semyon Ivanov
- Henryk Jabłoński
- Wojciech Jaruzelski
- Mikhail Katukov
- Nikita Khrushchev
- Kim Il Sung
- Leonid Kizim
- Dinmukhamed Kunaev
- Ivan Konev
- Vladimir Kovalyonok
- Viktor Kulikov
- Semyon Kurkotkin
- Pavel Kurochkin
- Pavel Kutakhov
- Vladimir Lyakhov
- Ivan Lyudnikov
- Rodion Malinovsky
- Igor Moiseyev
- Andriyan Nikolayev
- Nikolai Ogarkov
- Vasily Petrov (marshal)
- Issa Pliyev
- Alexander Pokryshkin
- Konstantin Rokossovsky
- Nikolai Rukavishnikov
- Viktor Savinykh
- Sergey Sokolov (marshal)
- Souphanouvong
- Joseph Stalin
- Vladimir Sudets
- Valentina Tereshkova
- Gherman Titov
- Yumjaagiin Tsedenbal
- Butochiyn Tsog
- Dmitry Ustinov
- Aleksandr Vasilevsky
- Nikolay Voronov
- Kliment Voroshilov
- Alexei Yepishev
- Todor Zhivkov
- Georgy Zhukov
- Tôn Đức Thắng

=== Locations ===
- Bulgan Province
- Kyakhta (Buryatia, Russia)

=== Public institutions ===
- Mongolian Revolutionary Youth League
- Sukhe Bator Mongolian Pioneers Organization (twice)
- Newspaper "Unen" ("Truth") of the Central Committee of the MPRP
- Union of Mongolian Writers
- University of Finance and Economics

=== Military units/Institutions ===
- Military Academy of the General Staff of the Armed Forces of Russia
- 112th "Revolutionary Mongolia" Tank Brigade
- National Defense University
- Army Newspaper "Ulaan Od" ("Red Star")
- Soviet-Mongolian Friendship Society
- Lomonosov Moscow State University

== See also ==
- Orders, decorations, and medals of Mongolia
