= Order of the Red Banner (Mongolia) =

Order of the Red Banner for Military Valor
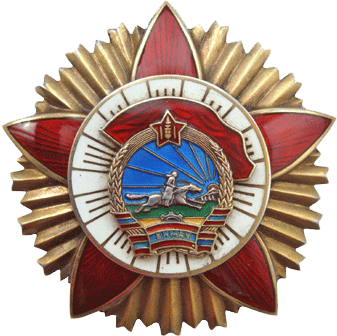
- Type: single-grade order
- Awarded for: Heroism in combat
- Presented by: Mongolian People's Republic
- Eligibility: Mongolian and foreign citizens, military units and formations, military schools, and institutions
- Formerly called: Order of the Red Banner
- Status: active
- Established: 1926

Highlights
- Total: ~10,000
- Ribbon of the award from 1926 to 1961
- Related: Order of the Red Banner (Soviet)

The Order of the Red Banner (Mongolian: «Цэргийн гавьяаны улаан туг» одон) is a military decoration of Mongolia, originally established as the "Order for Military Merit" of the People's Republic of Mongolia. The medal is awarded to citizens as well as foreigners and institutions for services to the state.

Renamed in 1945 as simply the "Order of the Red Banner", the design of the medallion has been changed several times, and in 1961 the ribbon bar of was changed before it was renamed to the "Order of the Red Banner for Military Valor" (or Military Merit) in 1993.

== Recipients ==
=== People ===
- Yumjaagiin Tsedenbal
- Batyn Dorj
- Jamsrangijn Jondon
- Lavrentiy Beria
- Georgy Zhukov (1939, 1942)
- Dmitry Ustinov (1983)
- Wojciech Jaruzelski (1983)
- Ivan Konev (1945)
- Ivan Kozhedub
- Ivan Bagramyan
- Grigory Shtern (1939)
- Viktor Gorbatko
- Sergei Shoigu (2018)
- Alexander Pokryshkin

=== Units/Formations ===
- Military Logistics Academy (1978)
- 032 Military Unit
- 014 Construction Unit
- 112th "Revolutionary Mongolia" Tank Brigade
- Army Newspaper "Ulaan Od" ("Red Star")
- Mongolian Arat squadron
- 17th Army (Soviet Union)
- S. M. Kirov Military Medical Academy (1978)

== Gallery ==
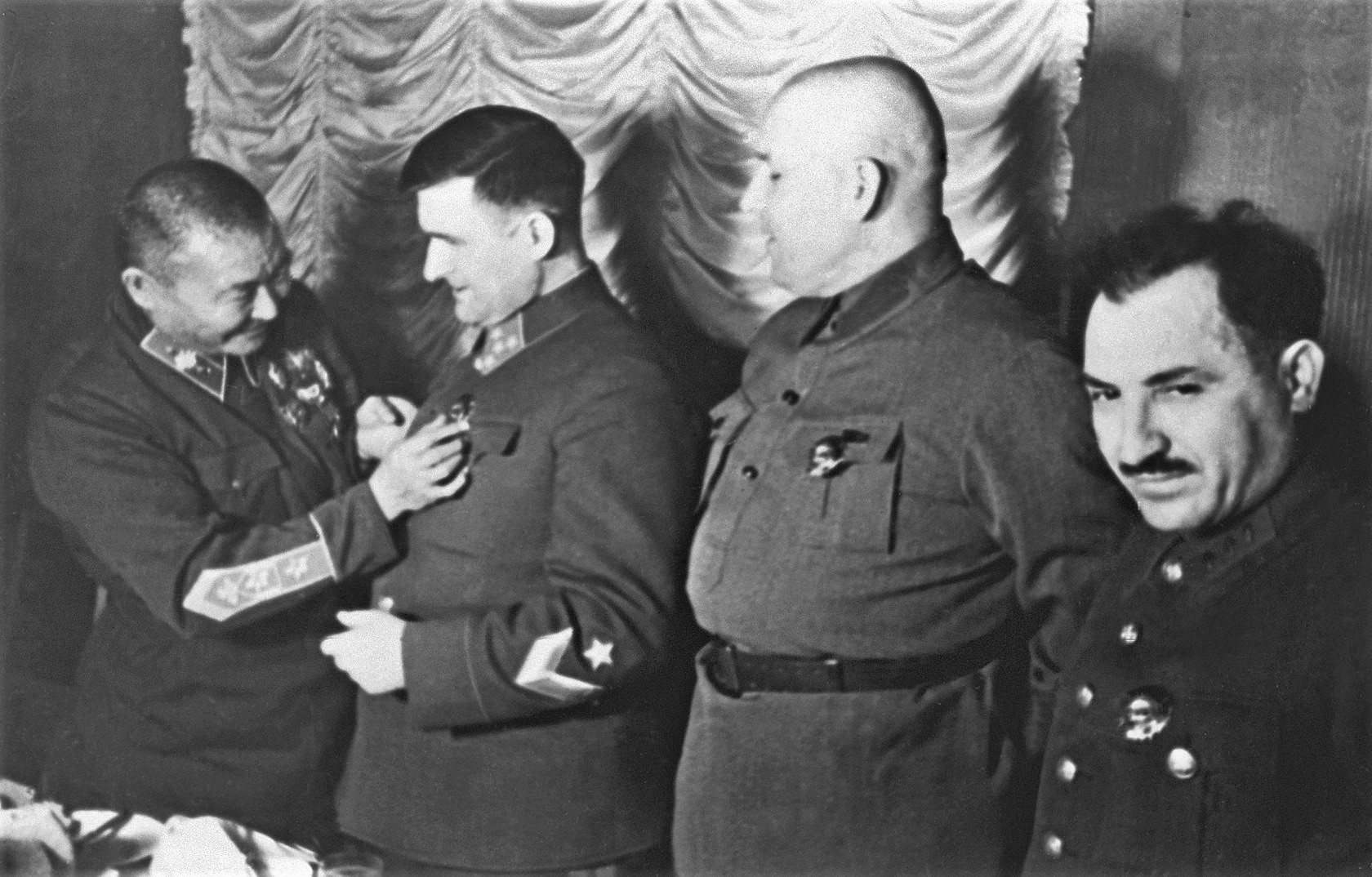
A ceremony of awarding the Order of the Red Banner by Khorloogiin Choibalsan to General Vasily Sokolovsky.

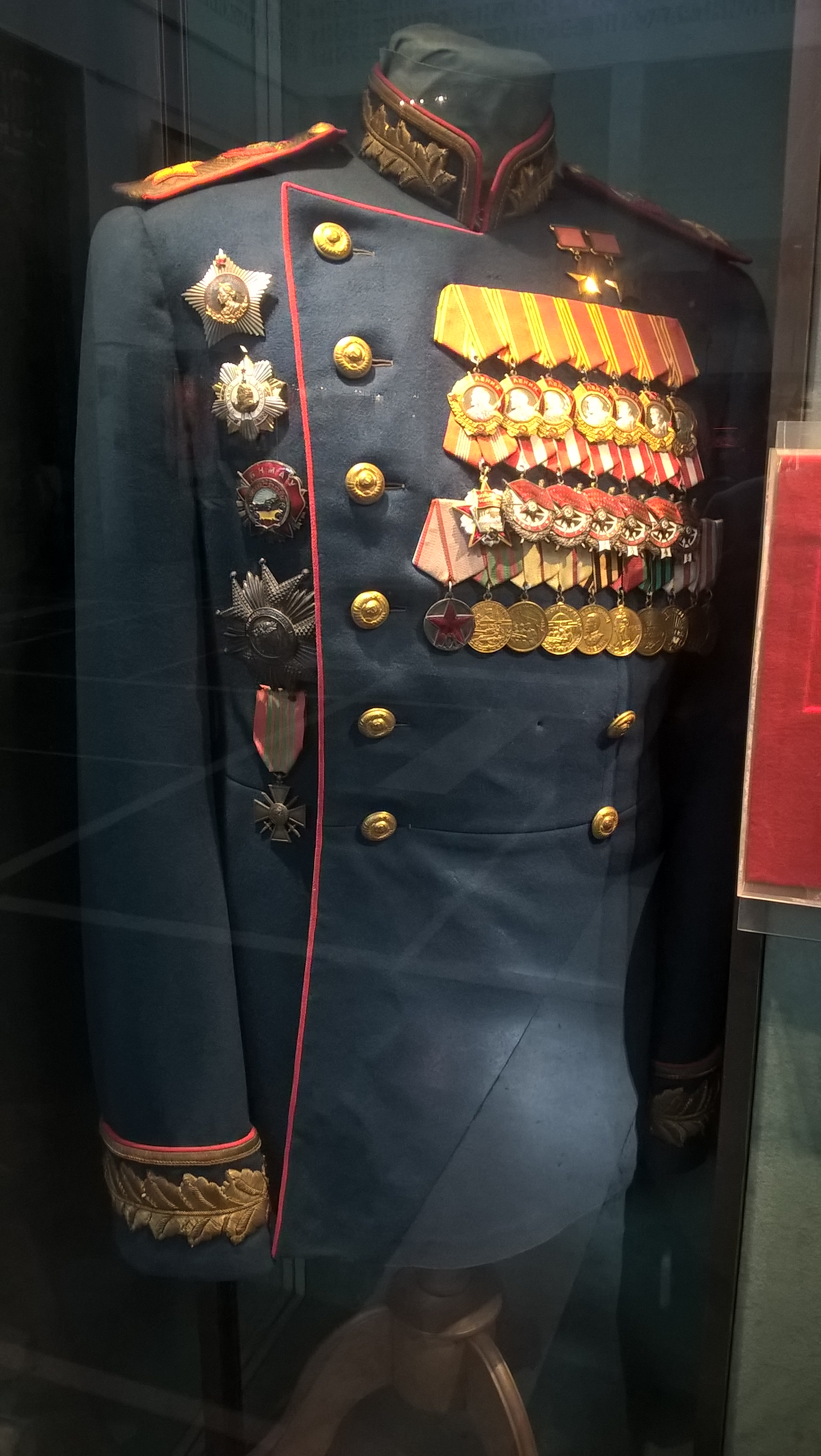
Order of the Red Banner of Mongolia (II type) on the ceremonial jacket of Marshal Rokossovsky
