= Mongolia in World War II =

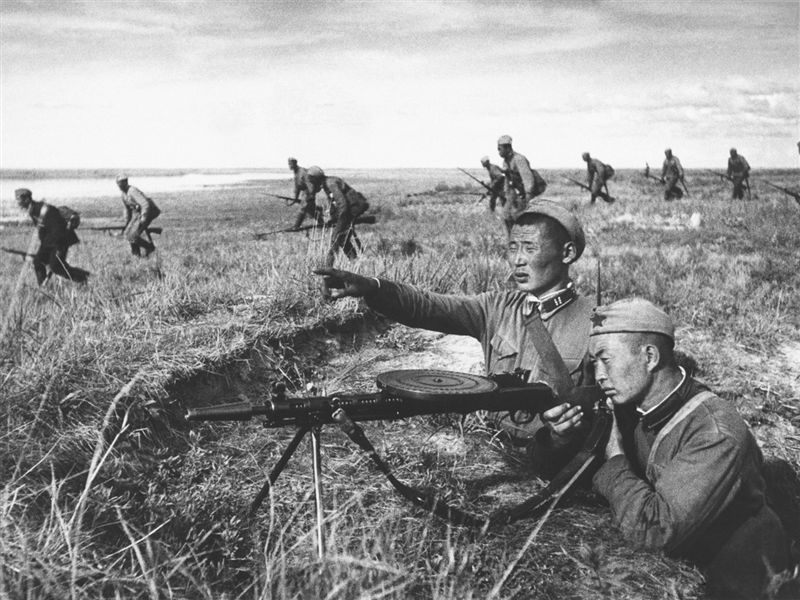
Mongolian People's Army soldiers at Khalkhin Gol, 1939

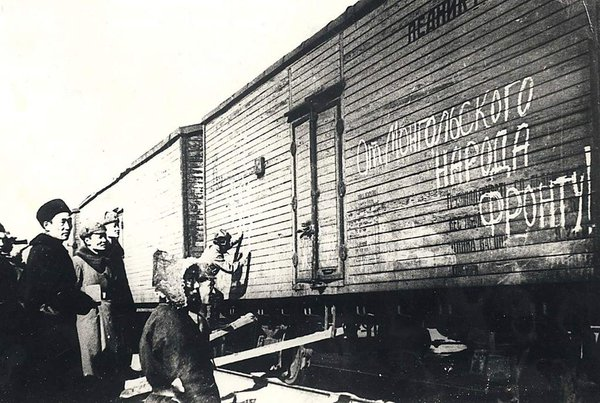
Mongolian horses being shipped to the USSR. The slogan translates as "From the Mongolian people—for the front!".

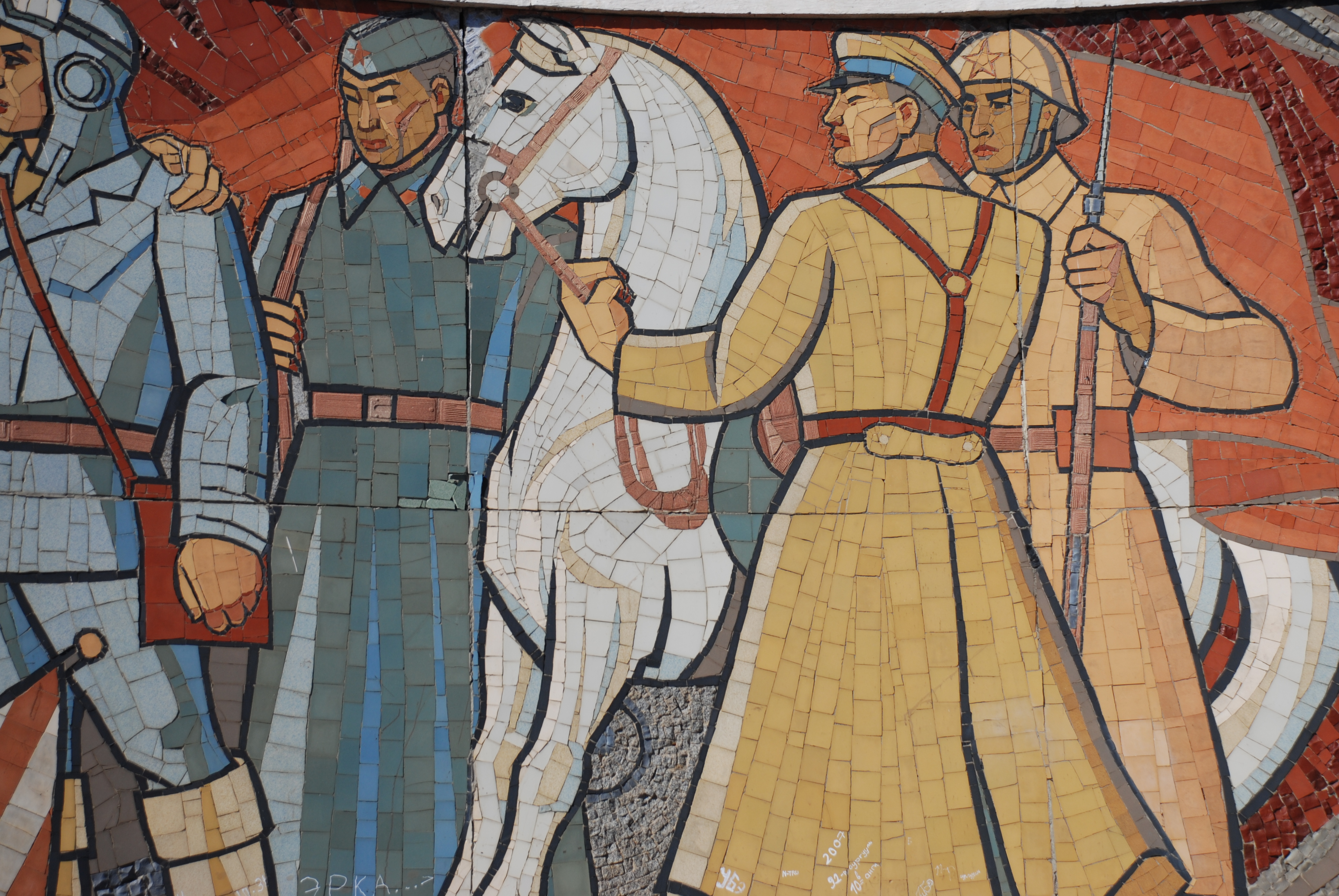
A detail from Ulaanbaatar's Zaisan Memorial

Outer Mongolia — officially the Mongolian People's Republic — was ruled (1930s to 1952) by the communist government of Khorloogiin Choibalsan during the period of World War II and had close links with the Soviet Union. Most countries regarded Mongolia, with its fewer than a million inhabitants, as a breakaway province of the Republic of China. Throughout the 1941–1945 war between Germany and the Soviet Union, Mongolia provided the Soviets with economic support—such as livestock, raw materials, money, food and military clothing—violating Mongolian neutrality in favor of the Allies. Mongolia was one of two Soviet satellite states not generally recognised as sovereign states at the time, along with the Tuvan People's Republic; both of these republics participated in World War II.

== Pre-war Soviet–Mongolian alliance against Japan ==
Soviet–Mongolian relations were governed by a "gentlemen's agreement" from 27 November 1934, which was formalised in a mutual assistance pact on 12 March 1936. This treaty created a mutual defensive military alliance, and also pledged both parties to remove troops from the territory of the other when the need for military assistance had passed. These agreements were directed at Japan, which had occupied Manchuria and advanced into Inner Mongolia, and had as their object the protection of the Soviet Trans-Siberian Railway.

On 13 August 1937, as part of their effort to support China in its war with Japan, the Soviets decided to station troops along Mongolia's southern and southeastern frontiers. To obtain the Mongolian government's consent, elaborate Japanese invasion plans were forged. On 24 August the Soviet deputy minister of defence, Pyotr Smirnov, and a small staff arrived in Mongolia to oversee the transfer of the Soviet 17th Army. The arrival of the Soviet army coincided, as planned, with a series of intensified terrors and purges (the "Great Terror"). In his address to the Third Session of the Supreme Soviet on 31 May 1939, Foreign Commissar Vyacheslav Molotov declared that "we shall defend the frontiers of the Mongolian People's Republic just as resolutely as our own border."

Mongolia was heavily involved in the Soviet–Japanese border conflicts, most notably the four-month-long Battles of Khalkhin Gol (May–September 1939). Most of these happened along Mongolia's eastern borders and are often seen as an important prelude to the Second World War.

== World War II ==
=== War against Germany ===
Mongolia reportedly signed an agreement with the Japanese puppet state of Manchukuo on 18 July 1940. In the Soviet–Japanese Neutrality Pact of April 13 1941, the two powers recognised the neutrality of Mongolia and its place within the Soviet sphere of influence. Its geographical situation meant that it served as a buffer between Japanese forces and the Soviet Union. In addition to keeping around 10% of the population under arms, Mongolia provided supplies and raw materials to the Soviet military, and financed several units, for example the "Revolutionary Mongolia" Tank Brigade and "Mongolian Arat" Squadron and half a million military horses. Also, more than 300 Mongolian volunteer military personnel fought in the Eastern front.

=== War against Japan ===
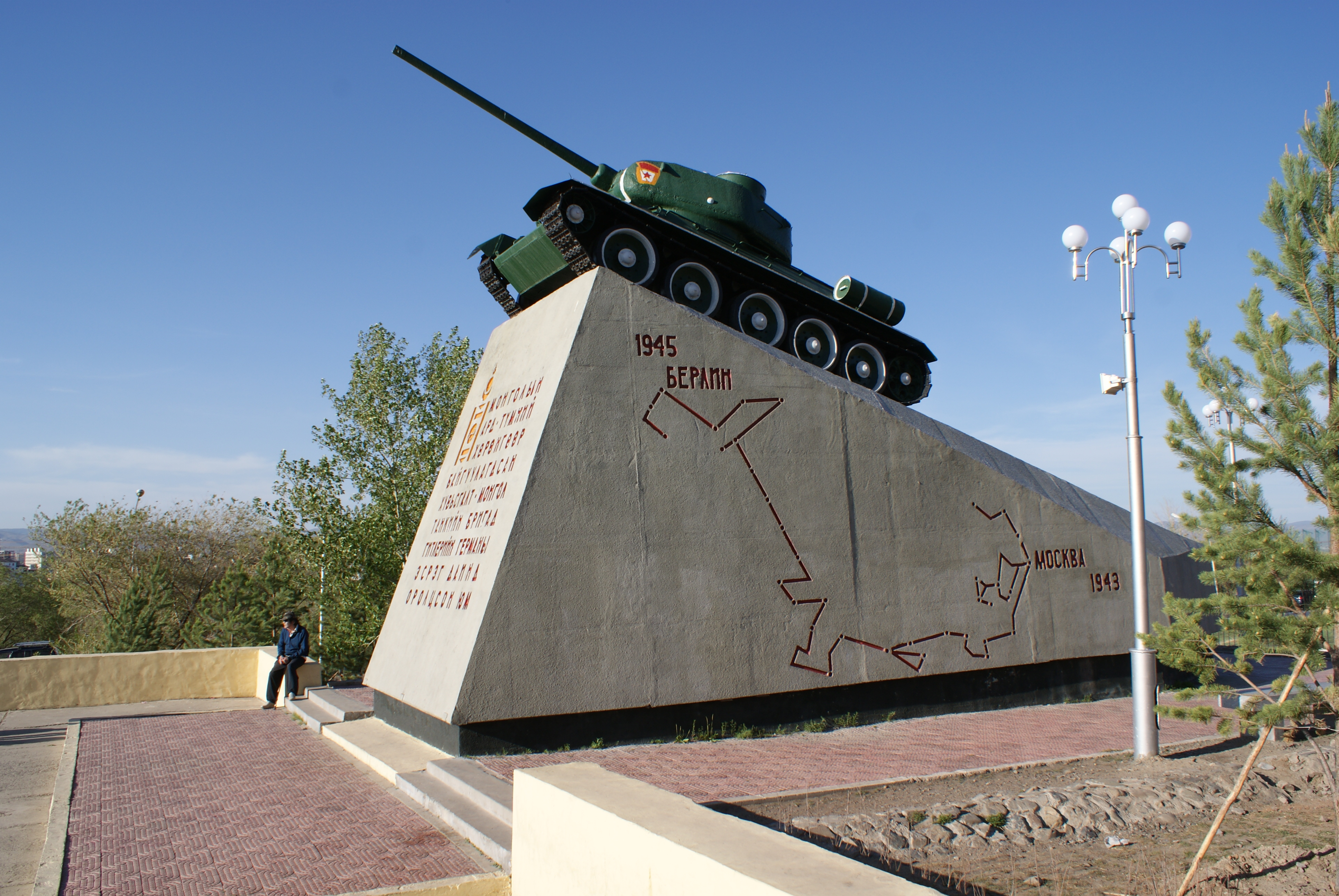
A World War II memorial in Ulaanbaatar, featuring a T-34/85 tank.

Mongolian troops took part in the Soviet invasion of Manchuria in August 1945, although as a small part in Soviet-led operations against Japanese forces and their Manchu and Inner Mongolian allies. During the 1945 campaign, the Mongolian troops were attached to the Soviet–Mongolian Cavalry Mechanized Group under Colonel General I. A. Pliev. The Mongolian units were the 5th, 6th, 7th and 8th Mongolian Cavalry Divisions, the 7th Motorized Armored Brigade, the 3rd tank special regiment and the 3rd Artillery Regiment and also Mongolian aviation mixed division . On 10 August 1945, over twenty-four hours after the first Mongolian troops in the company of their Soviet allies had crossed the border into Japanese-occupied China, the Little Khural, the Mongolian parliament, issued a formal declaration of war against Japan.

Today, the Zaisan Memorial in the southern area of the Mongolian capital of Ulaanbaatar honors the Mongolian and Soviet soldiers killed in World War II.

== See also ==
- World War II by country
- Mengjiang, a Japanese satellite state created in Inner Mongolia
