= Morets =

Morets Морец
- Selo
- Location within Volgograd Oblast Location within Russia
- Coordinates: 51°01′N 44°01′E
- Country: Russia
- Region: Volgograd Oblast
- District: Yelansky District
- Time zone: UTC+4:00

Morets (Russian: Морец) is a rural locality (a selo) and the administrative center of the Moretskoye Rural Settlement, Yelansky District, Volgograd Oblast, Russia. The population was 652 as of 2010. The settlement consists of 9 streets.

== Geography ==
Morets is located on Khopyorsko-Buzulukskaya Plain, on the bank of the Vyazovka River, 28 km northeast of Yelan (the district's administrative centre) by road. Shchelokovka is the nearest rural locality.
