= Iosif Gusakovsky =

Belarusian Soviet military leader (1904–1995)

Iosif Iraklievich Gusakovsky
- Russian: Иосиф Ираклиевич Гусаковский; Belarusian: Іосіф Іракліевіч Гусакоўскі
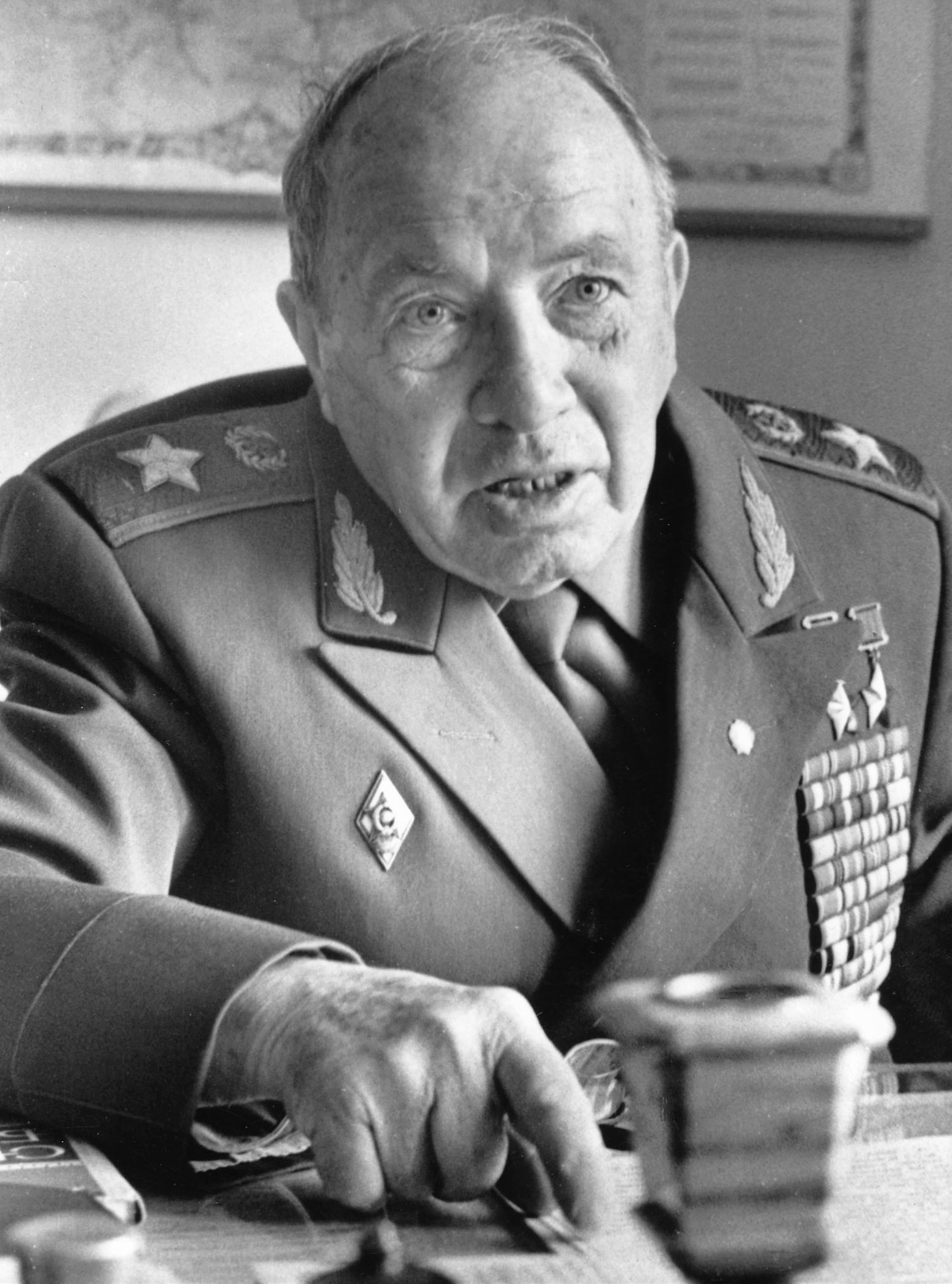
- Gusakovsky in 1984
- Born: 25 December [O.S. 12 December] 1904; Vorodkovo village, Mogilev Governorate, Russian Empire
- Died: 20 February 1995 (aged 90); Moscow, Russian Federation
- Military career
- Allegiance: Soviet Union
- Branch: Red Army
- Service years: 1928–1937; 1941–1992
- Rank: General of the army
- Conflicts: World War II
- Awards: Hero of the Soviet Union (twice)

Iosif Iraklievich Gusakovsky (Russian: Иосиф Ираклиевич Гусаковский, Belarusian: Іосіф Іракліевіч Гусакоўскі; 25 December [O.S. 12 December] 1904 – 20 February 1995) was a Soviet military leader during World War II who was twice awarded the title Hero of the Soviet Union during World War II for his command of the 44th Guards Tank Brigade. He remained in the military after the war and in 1968 became a General of the Army.

== Early life ==
Gusakovsky was born to a large peasant family of Belarusian ethnicity in the agricultural village of Vorodkovo in the Cherikovsky Uyezd of Mogilev Governorate (now Krychaw District in Belarus) over a decade before the formation of the Soviet Union. In 1912 his family moved to the city of Mogilev where his father worked, but they lived on the outskirts of the city. In 1921 they moved to the city of Shaevka, where he completed school before he began working.

== Pre World War II ==
After voluntarily joining the Red Army in 1928, he graduated from the Leningrad Higher Cavalry School in 1931. That year in April he became a platoon commander in the 59th Cavalry Regiment based in Kirsanov, and in October 1932 after completing further training in Zhytomyr he became the commander of the training platoon in the 14th Mechanized Regiment. He later became a squadron commander in the regiment before entering short-term command staff courses in Moscow, after which he became the assistant chief of staff of the 12th Mechanized Regiment.

During the Great Purge, allegations were made that he came from a kulak family; he was kicked out of Communist Party in May 1937 and in June he was dismissed from the Army on charges of withholding his origin. However, because he was not immediately arrested after his dismissal, he was able to survive the purge by fleeing to Donbass where he worked as an inspector at a local consumer union and later at a coal mine. Once the scale of the terror decreased, he applied for permission to rejoin the party and was accepted in July 1938; in April 1941 he was reinstated into the Army and appointed as the adjutant of a tank battalion in the 147th Separate Tank Regiment of the 103rd Motorized Division.

== World War II ==
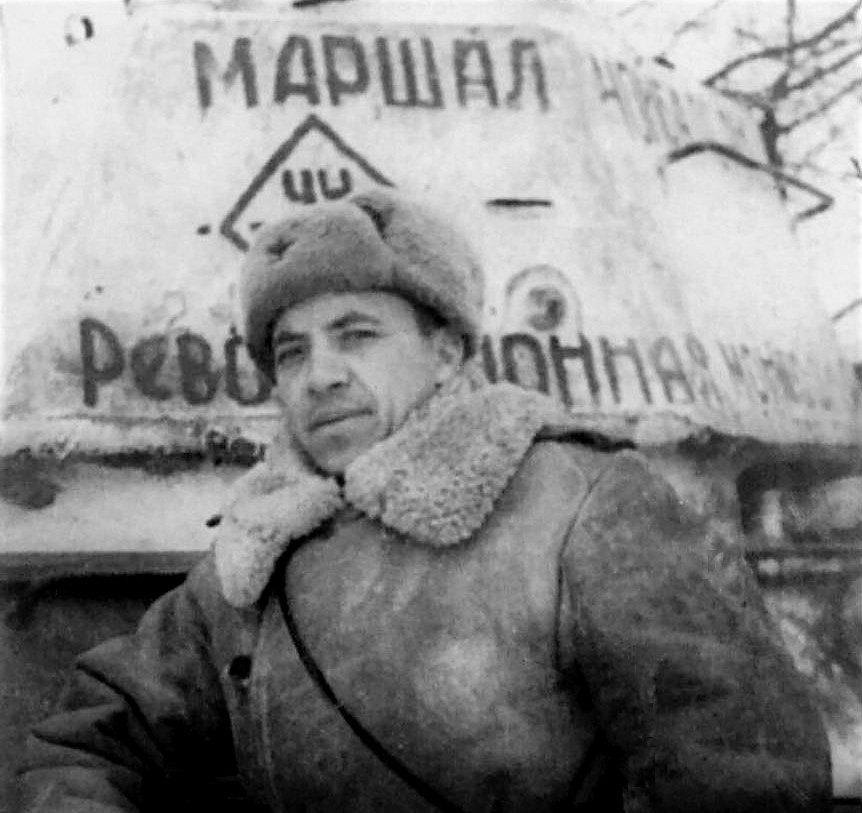
Gusakovsky as a lieutenant colonel in World War II.

Upon the German invasion of the Soviet Union, the 103rd Motorized Division was quickly deployed to the Western front. In July Gusakovsky had his baptism by fire while part of an infantry unit. In August he became the chief of staff of a tank regiment, and in September he was made the chief of staff of the 688th Motorized Rifle Regiment. When the regiment was disbanded in November he was reassigned to the 131st Separate Tank Battalion of the 50th Army. There he participated in battles for Smolensk, Yelnya, Moscow, Tula, and Yukhnov. In February 1942 he was promoted to becoming the deputy chief of operations, and in April he became the chief of staff of the 112th Tank Brigade. When the commander of the brigade was killed during the Battle of Kursk in August 1943, Gusakovsky took command and the unit was soon awarded the Guards designation and renamed the 44th Guards Tank Brigade for its accomplishments in battle. On 12 August 1943 he was wounded for the first time. Having been officially made the brigade's commander in September, he led the unit in the offensive for the Western Bug in July 1944. On 23 September 1944 he was awarded the title Hero of the Soviet Union for his role in the Lvov–Sandomierz Offensive.

During the Vistula-Oder Offensive his brigade maintained a bridgehead on the Pilitsa River. On 17 January 1945 they expelled German forces from Łowicz. They continued to advance through Eastern Europe, taking 10 axis tanks, 59 armored vehicles, 43 guns, 12 self-propelled guns, and 6 warehouses. 4000 Axis soldiers were either killed or captured in the process. He was again awarded the title Hero of the Soviet Union on 6 April 1945 for his leadership during the offensive. On 27 April 1945 he was wounded during the Battle for Berlin. Having entered the war as a senior lieutenant, Gusakovsky was a colonel in commanded of a decorated brigade by the end of the war.

== Postwar ==
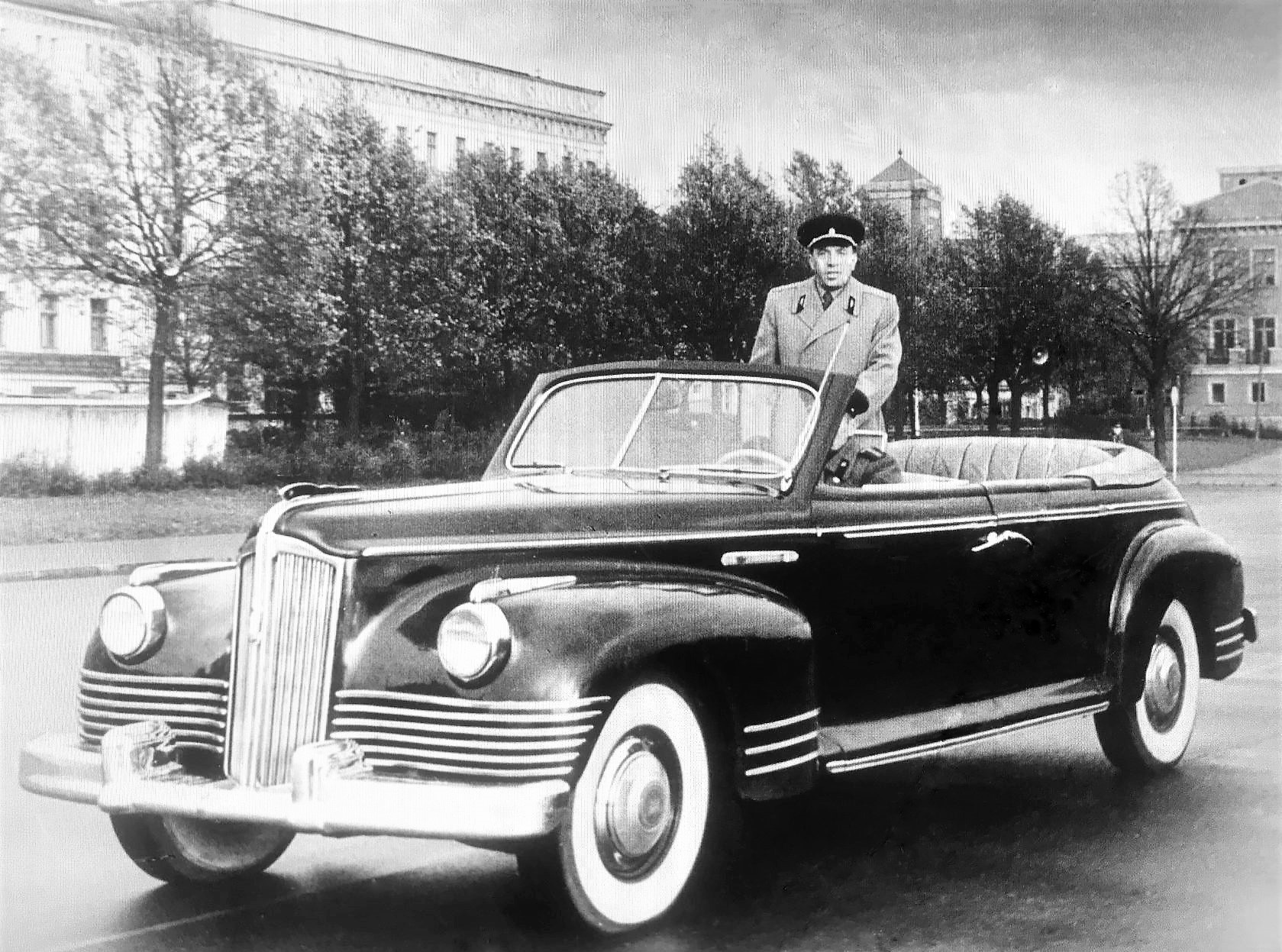
Guaskovsky at a military parade in Riga, 1959.

Guaskovsky remained in command of his brigade for one year after the end of the war, after which he went on to hold a variety of command posts and graduated from the prestigious K.E.Voroshilov Military Academy. In 1968 he became a General of the Army, and in 1970 he became a military inspector. Having retired in 1992, he died in 1995 and was buried in the Novodevichy cemetery.

== Awards and honors ==
=== Soviet ===
- Twice Hero of the Soviet Union
- Four Order of Lenin
- Order of the October Revolution
- Four Order of the Red Banner
- Two Order of the Patriotic War 1st class
- Two Order of the Red Star
- Order "For Service to the Homeland in the Armed Forces of the USSR" 3rd class
- Medal "For Courage"
- campaign and commemorative medals

=== Russian ===
- Order of Friendship
- Medal of Zhukov

=== Foreign ===
- Mongolia - Order of Sukhbaatar
- Mongolia - Order of the Red Banner
- Mongolia - Order "For Military Merit"
- Poland - Virtuti Militari
- Poland - Order of Polonia Restituta 1st class
- Poland - Medal of Victory and Freedom
- East Germany - Patriotic Order of Merit 1st class
- Bulgaria - Order of 9 September 1944
- China - Medal of Sino-Soviet Friendship
