= Zaisan Memorial =

WWII memorial in Khan-Uul, Ulaanbaatar, Mongolia

Coordinates: 47°53′3″N 106°54′57″E

- Ulaanbaatar
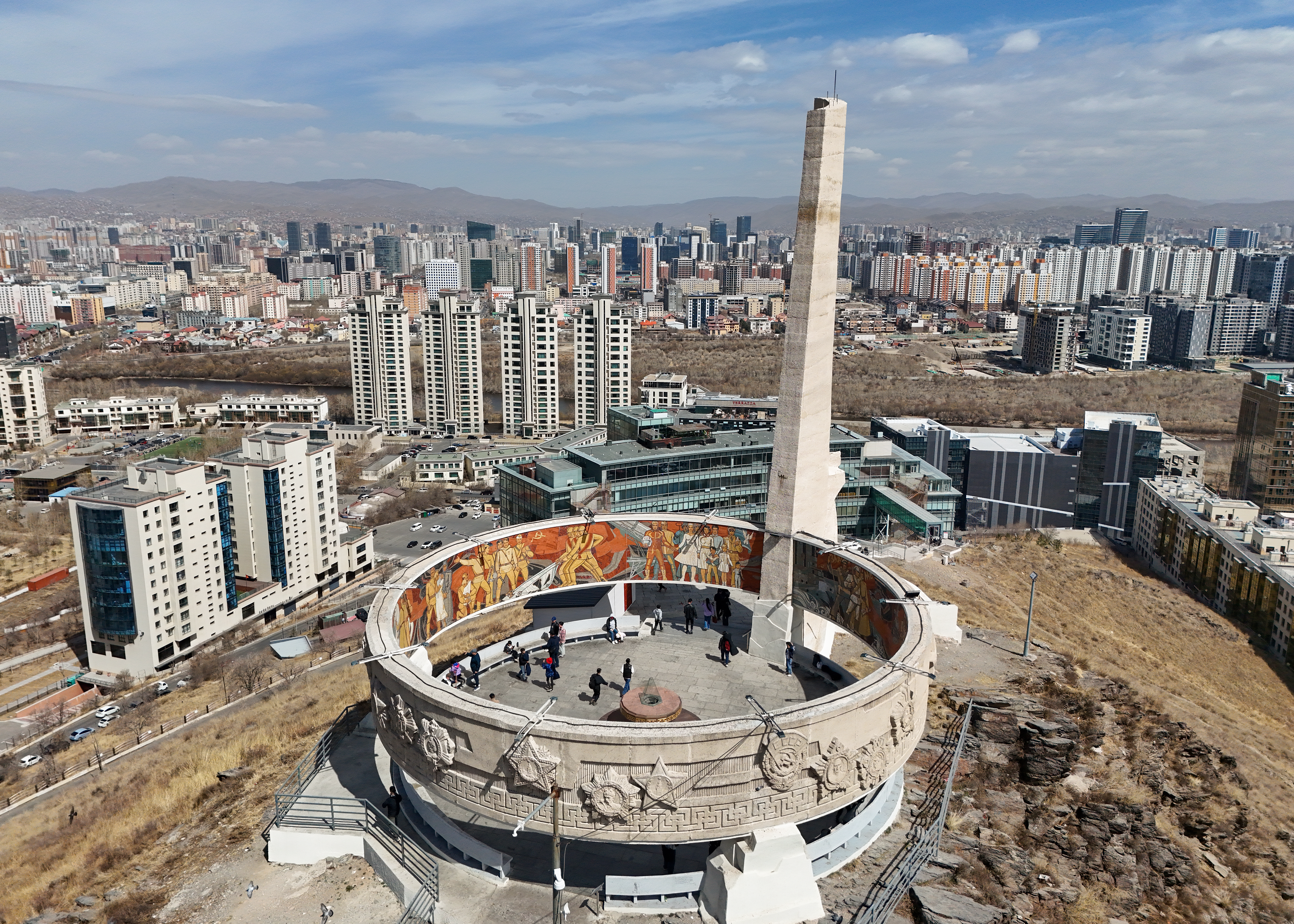
- Aerial view of the memorial
- For Mongolian and Soviet war dead of the Second World War
- Unveiled: 1971
- Location: Ulaanbaatar
- Designed by: A. Khishigt
- Алтан амь тань бидэнд бий, алдар гавьяа тань амьдралд бий; Your precious lives in us continue, your glorious deeds in life immortal

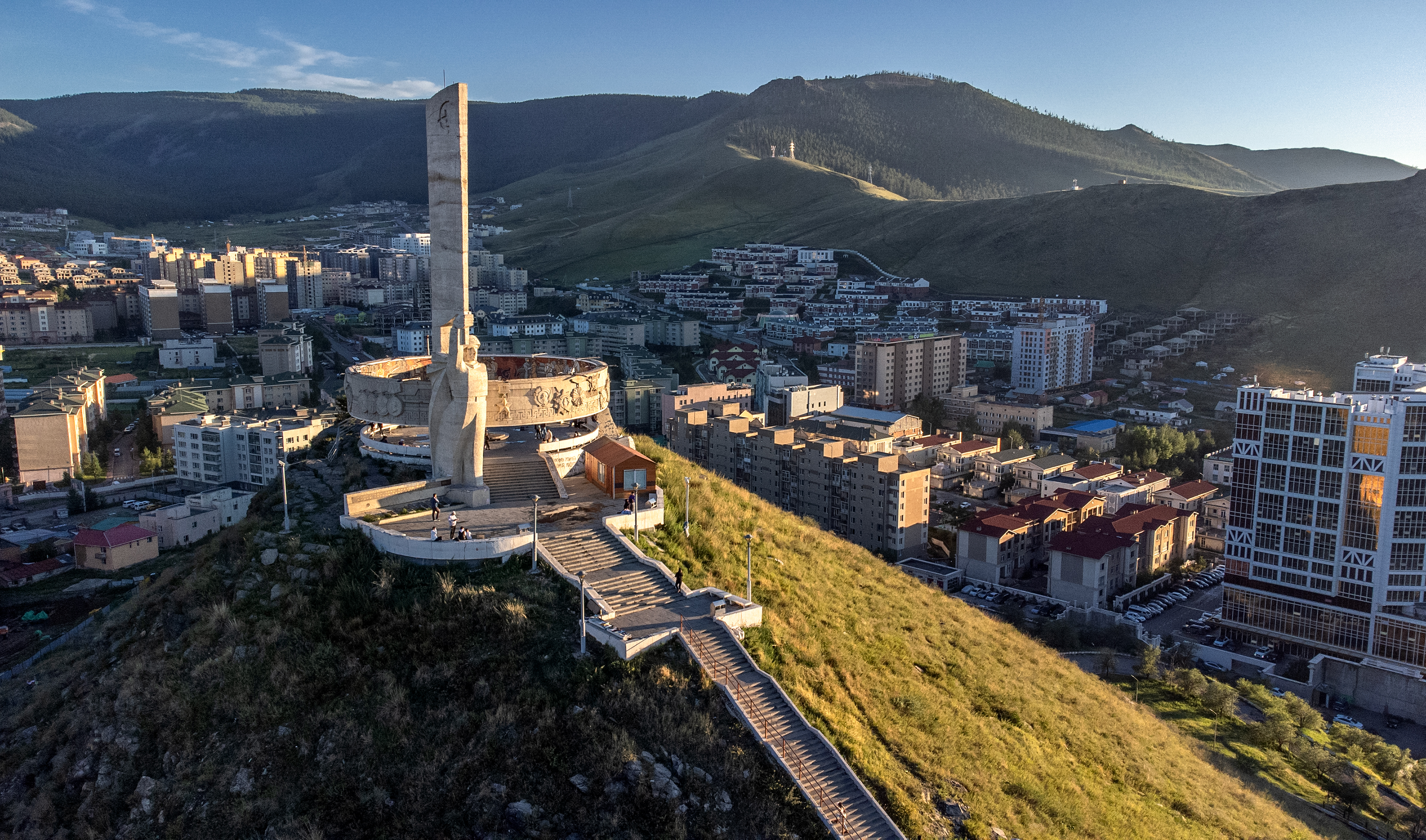
Zaisan Memorial

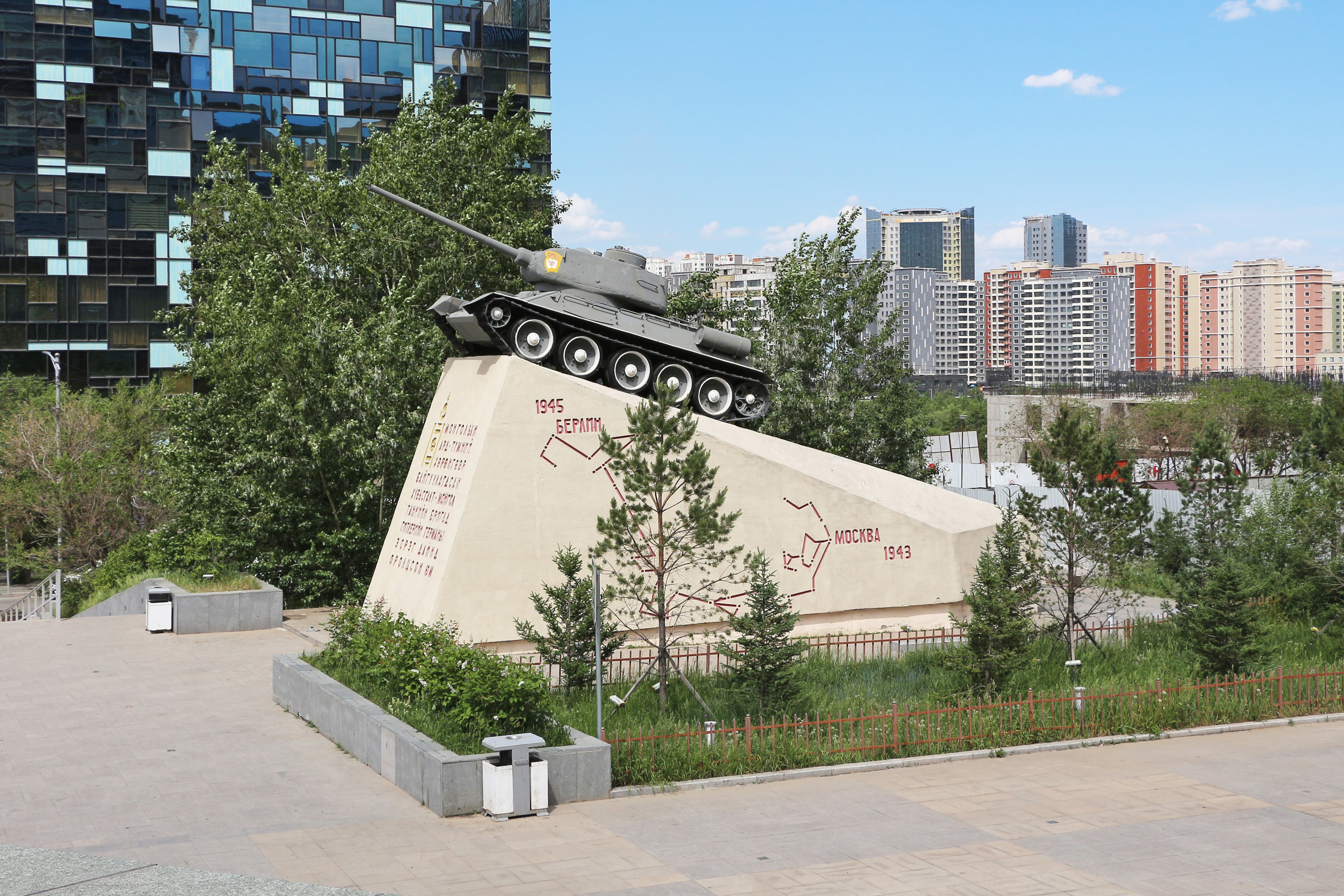
T-34 tank used by the Soviet Union, now placed below the Zaisan Memorial hill

The Zaisan Memorial (Mongolian: Зайсан толгой, romanized: Zaisan tolgoi) is a memorial in Khan-Uul, Ulaanbaatar, the capital city of Mongolia, that honors allied Mongolian and Soviet soldiers killed in World War II.

== History ==
Construction for the memorial began in 1969, led by chief architect A. Khisegt. The monument was unveiled in 1971 during the 50th anniversary of the People's Revolution of 1921.

== Design ==
The memorial, located in the southern part of Ulaanbaatar, starts with monumental symbols of two nations – the Mongolian Soyombo and the Soviet Hammer and Sickle. The wall on the plaza, on the northern foot of the hill, has the words "Here the memory of Soviet soldiers, forever enshrined, in the sky with the sun and in the soil with the fire" inscribed in copper, both in Mongolian and Russian. From here, a 612-step, 300-meter-long staircase leads to the main Heroes' Monument on top of the hill, and a 680-meter-long paved road reaches the middle section of the hill, allowing for vehicles to reach the halfway point of its total height.

The Heroes' Monument features a circular painting that depicts scenes of friendship between the people of the USSR and Mongolia. The mural depicts scenes such as the Aurora sparking the Russian Revolution in 1917, Soviet support for Mongolia's independence declaration in 1921, the defeat of the Japanese Kwantung Army by the Soviets at Khalkhin Gol on the Mongolian border in 1939, Soviet victory over Nazi Germany in 1945 and peacetime achievements such as Soviet space flights including the flight of Soyuz 39 which carried the first Mongolian into space, Jugderdemidiin Gurragchaa.

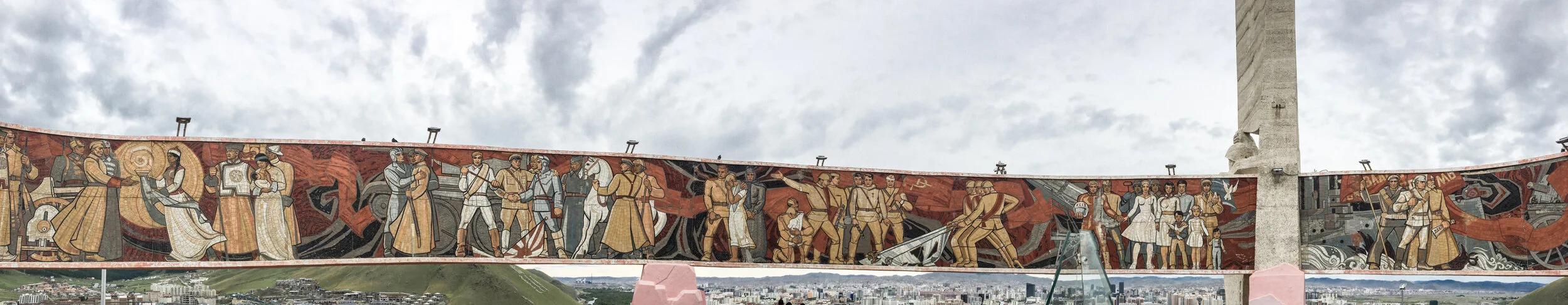
Panorama of the mural inside the Zaisan Memorial.

The monument itself resembles the Mongolian traditional fireplace, Tulga (Mongolian: Тулга), which symbolizes life. This life was brought by the sacrifice of fallen Soviet heroes, and the independence of Mongolia owes a great deal of debt to the Red Army soldiers who are epitomized by a 27-meter-tall statue holding the banner of victory in the right hand and a machine gun in the left hand. The ceremonial plaza to its side features an inscription in Mongolian, "Your precious lives in us continue, your glorious deeds in life immortal."

In place of honor rest the samples of soil from Altanbulag, the cradle of the 1921 People's Revolution, Tolbo Lake, and Khalkh River, where the two allied armies fought together in 1921 and the latter in 1939. In the center of the monument, there is a red porphyry bowl decorated with a Mongolian meander, which emanates an eternal flame.

In 2003, a T-34 tank memorial, which previously had been located on a crossroads between Zaisan and the city center, was moved to the foot of the hill. It features a Soviet tank from the 112th "Revolutionary Mongolia" Tank Brigade, paid for by the Mongolian people. The tank memorial includes a map showing the route the 112th brigade took from Moscow in 1943 to its participation in the fall of Berlin in 1945.

== Today ==
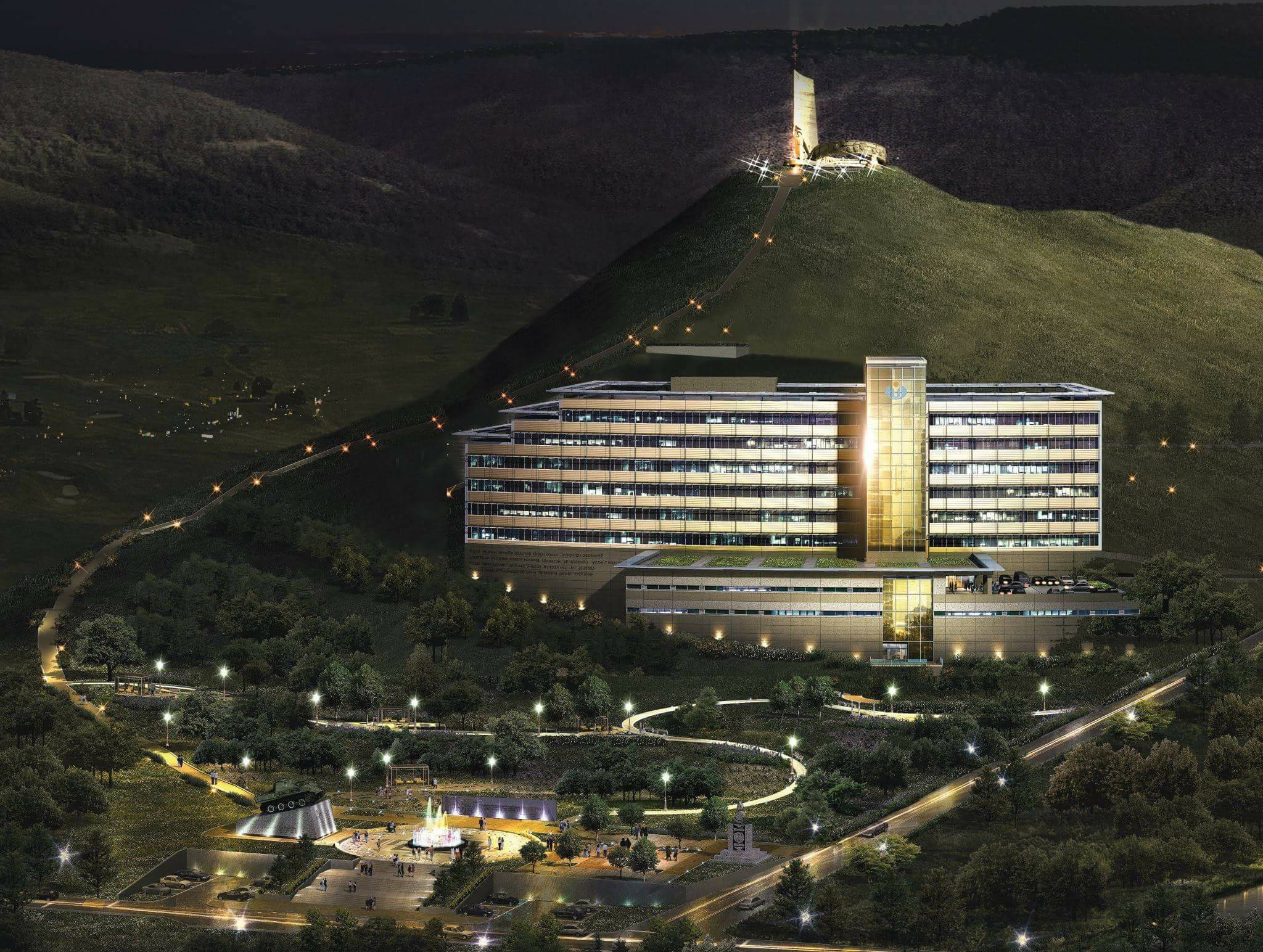
Zaisan Hill Complex

Zaisan Hill is a popular meeting point for school outings and graduation festivities due to its panoramic view of Ulaanbaatar. In recent times, more and more modern luxury housing developments have popped up near the Zaisan region, making it popular as an elite residential district.

The Zaisan Hill Complex (Mongolian: Зайсан Хилл цогцолбор), a cultural and entertainment complex, was built on the northern foot of the hill and was opened in late 2017.

In August 2024, the memorial site underwent a six-month-long renovation with the funding of Leningrad Oblast; the first major renovation to occur since its unveiling 50 years ago. The renovation was completed and the memorial was opened to the public on 26 January 2025

== Gallery ==
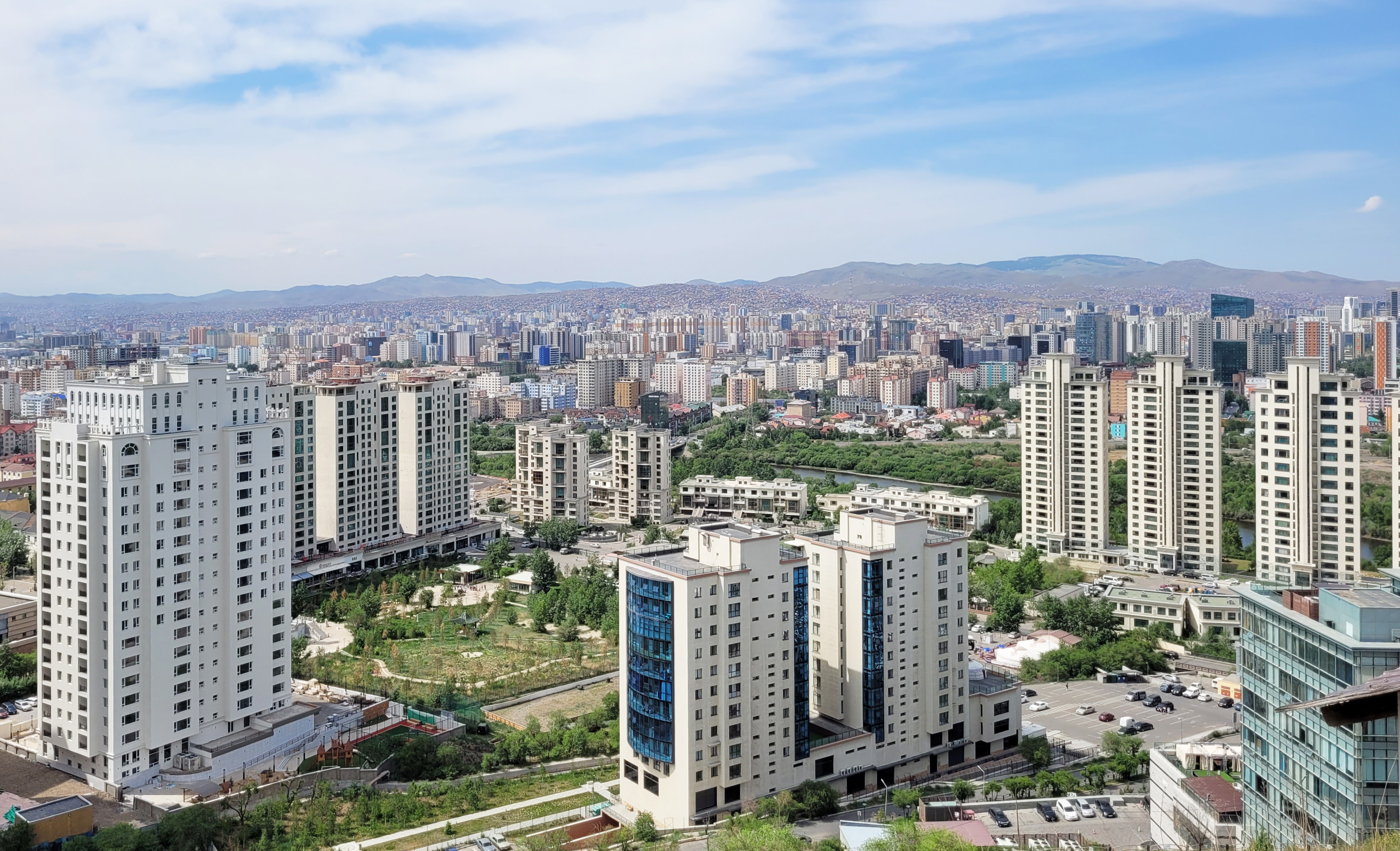
View of Ulaanbaatar from atop the Zaisan Hill Complex.

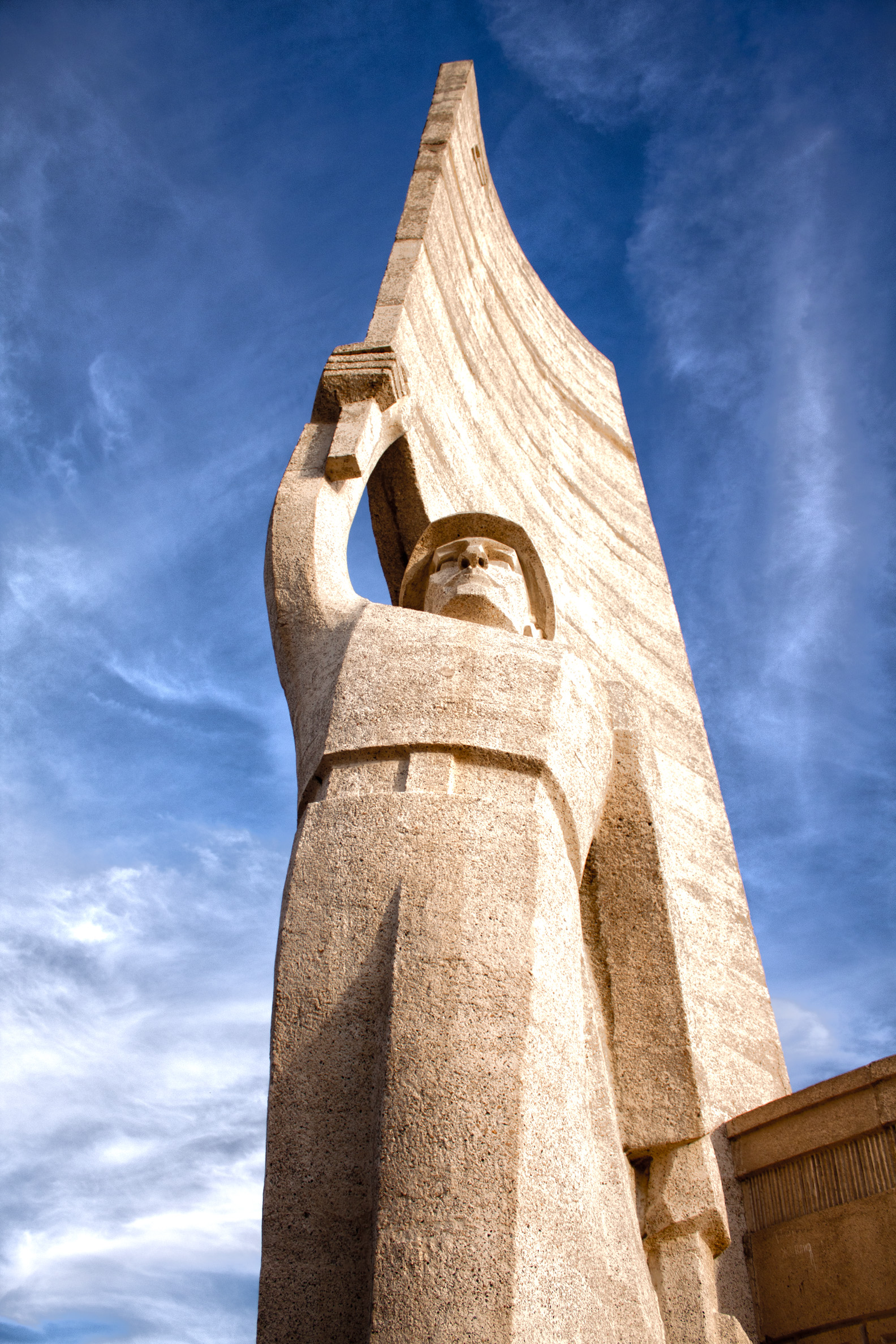
Side view of the Red Army soldier holding a victory banner

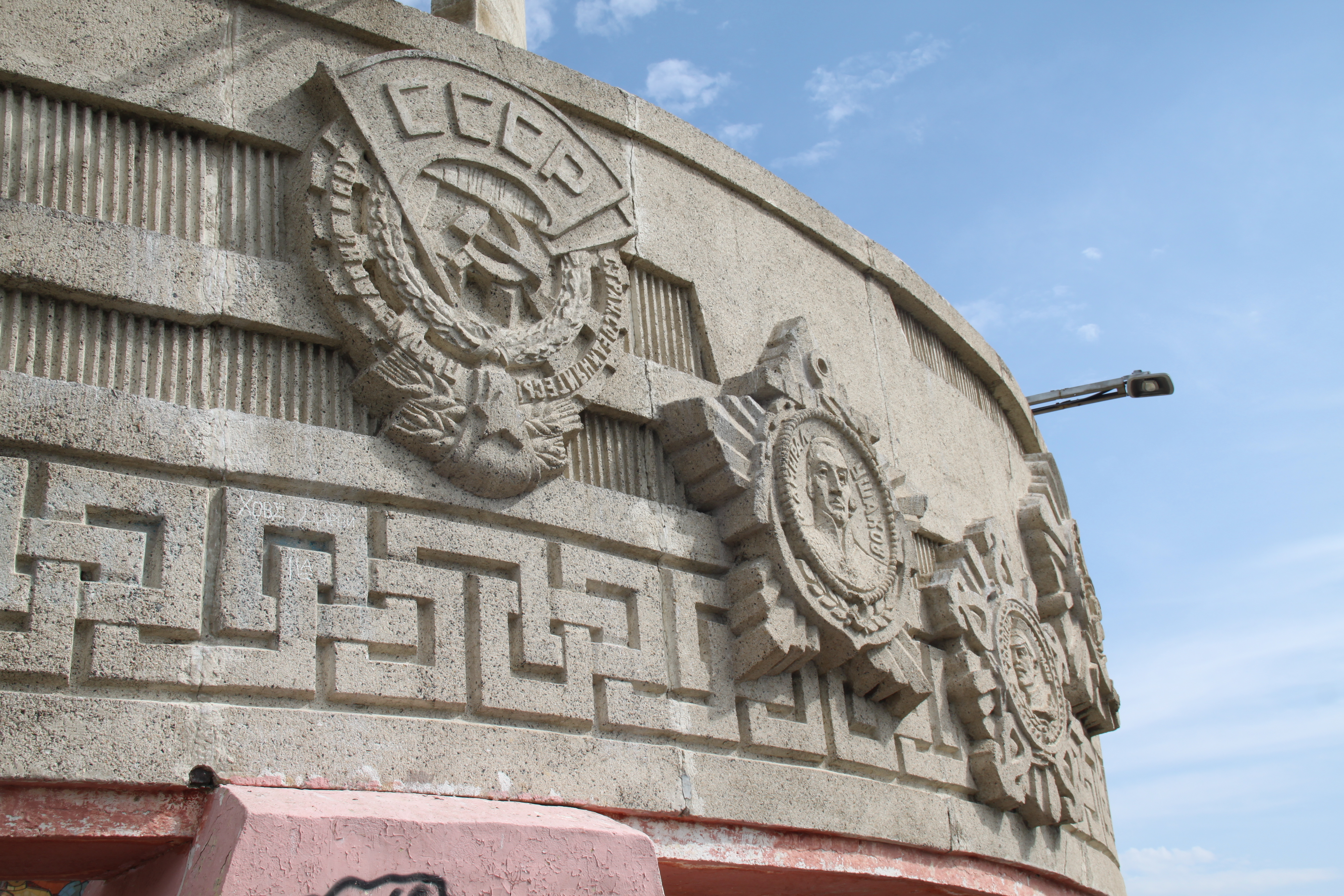
Exteriors decorated with Mongolian and Soviet awards

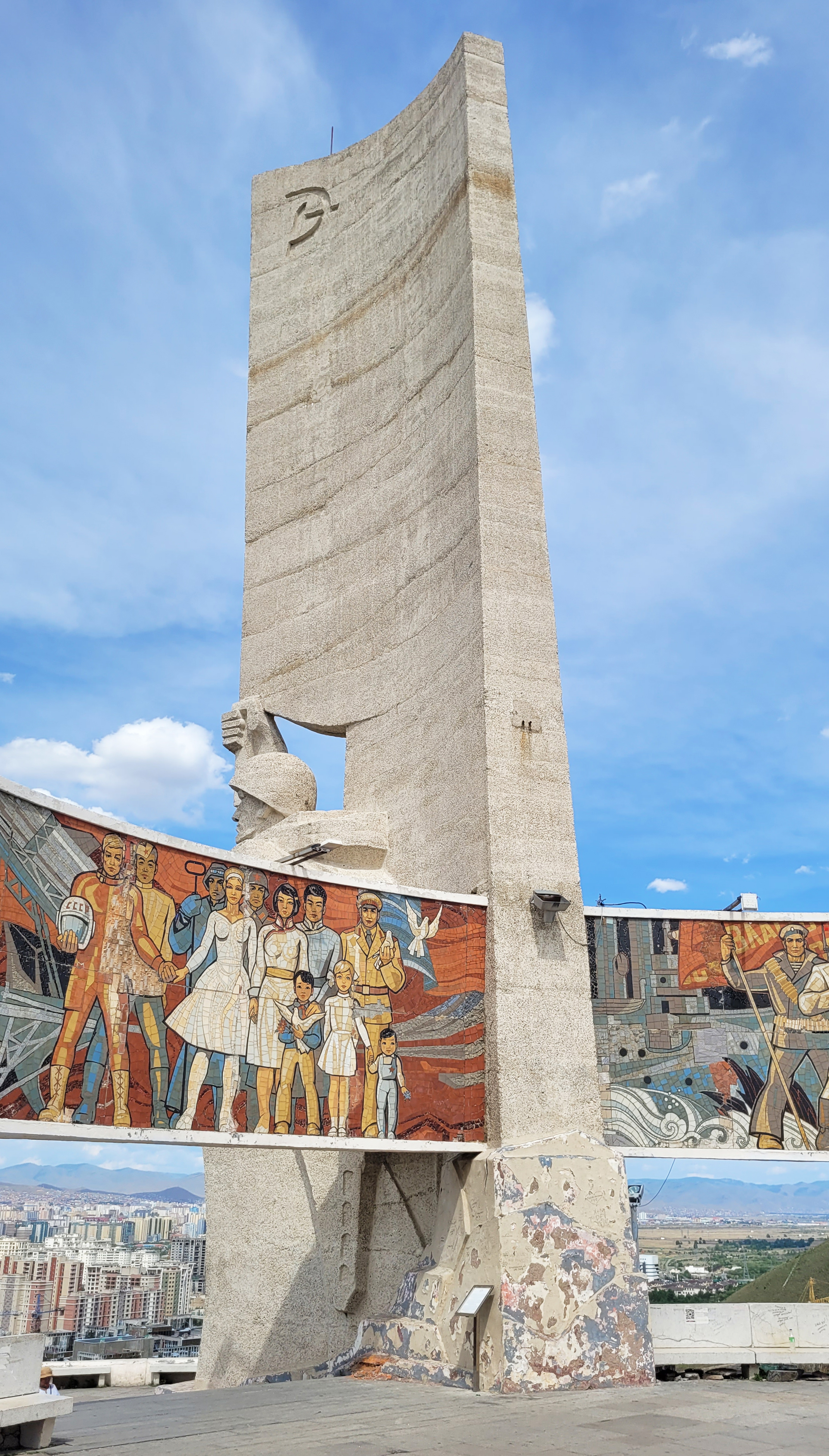
View from the inside

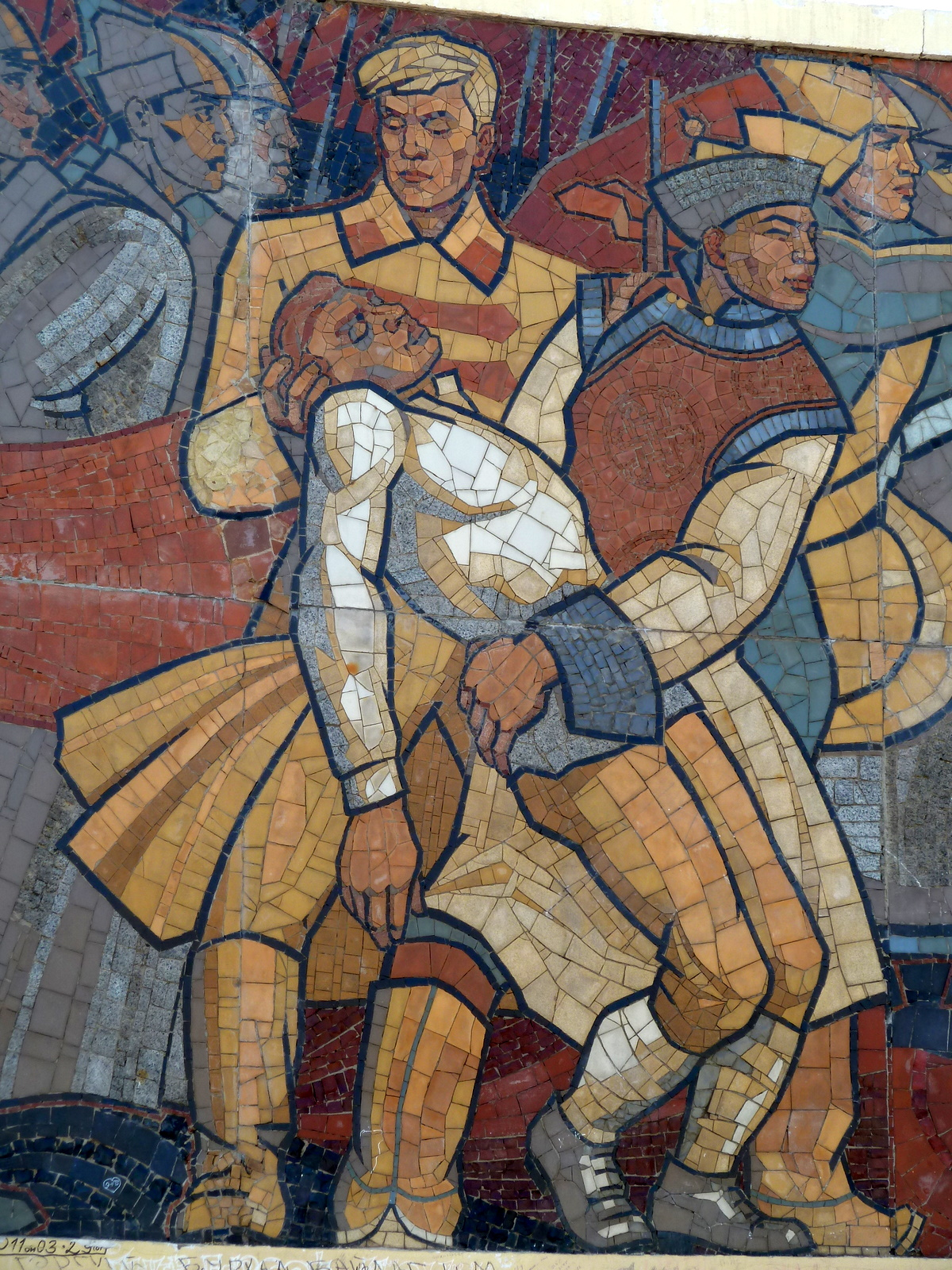
Mural in close-up

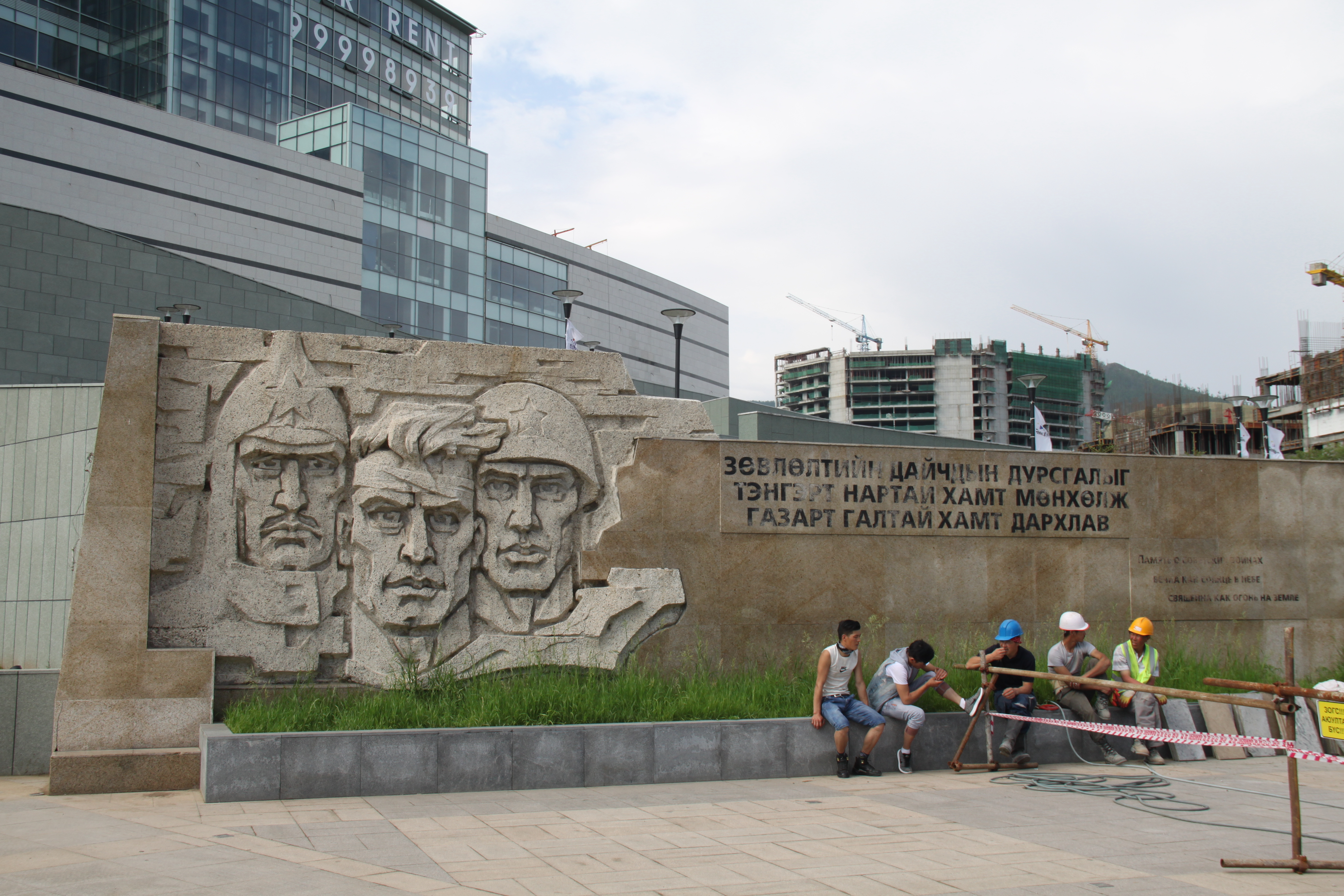
A wall in the northern slopes with the inscription "Here the memory of Soviet soldiers, forever enshrined, in the sky with the sun and in the soil with the fire"

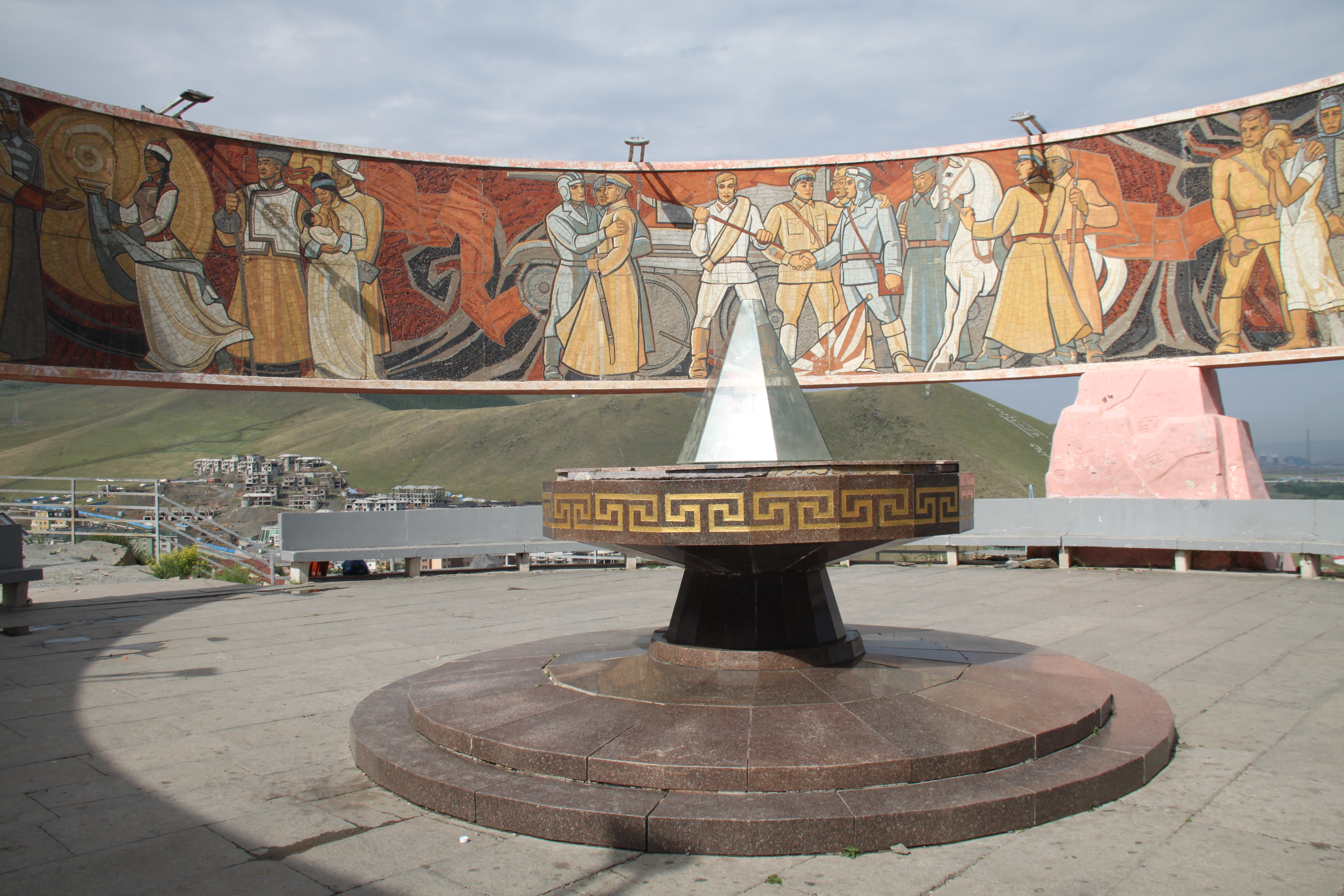
Eternal flame at the center

== See also ==
- Mongolia in World War II
- Mongolia-Soviet Union relations
