= 112th "Revolutionary Mongolia" Tank Brigade =

Soviet and Russian military unit

112th Tank Division (1941–1942) 112th Tank Brigade (1942–1943) 44th Guards Tank Brigade (1943–1946) 44th Guards Tank Regiment (1946–1993) 44th Guards Tank Training Regiment (1993–present)
- Active: 1941–present
- Country: Soviet Union (1941–1991); Russia (1991–present)
- Branch: Soviet Army (1941–1991); Russian Ground Forces (1991–present)
- Type: Armored
- Part of: 467th Guards District Training Centre
- Garrison/HQ: Vladimir
- Engagements: World War II: Battle of Moscow; Battle of Kursk; Zhitomir-Berdichev Offensive; Battle of the Korsun-Cherkassy Pocket; Lvov-Sandomierz Offensive; Vistula-Oder Offensive; East Pomeranian Offensive; Berlin Offensive
- Decorations: Order of Lenin Order of the Red Banner; Order of Suvorov 2nd class Order of Kutuzov 2nd class Order of Bogdan Khmelnitsky 2nd class Order of the Red Star; Order of Sukhbaatar Order of the Red Banner (Mongolia)
- Battle honours: Berdichev; Revolutionary Mongolia

Commanders
- Notable commanders: Andrei Getman; Iosif Gusakovsky

The 112th "Revolutionary Mongolia" Tank Brigade (Russian: 112-я танковая бригада «Революционная Монголия», romanized: 112-ya tankovaya brigade "Revolutsionnaya Mongoliya"), previously the 112th Tank Brigade, was a military formation in the Red Army, funded by contributions from the People's Republic of Mongolia, during World War II. It was originally formed as the 112th Tank Division.

== 112th Tank Division ==
The 112th Tank Division was formed in August 1941, in Primorsky Krai on the basis of the 112th Tank Regiment, 239th Motorised Division, 30th Mechanised Corps. Its order of battle was as follows:

- 124th Tank Regiment (1st, 2nd, 3rd Tank Battalions, each with 32 T-26 tanks);
- 125th Tank Regiment (1st, 2nd, 3rd Tank Battalions, each with 32 T-26 tanks);
- 112th Motorized Regiment (1st, 2nd, 3rd Battalions)
- 112th Motorized Howitzer Regiment (1st and 2nd Battalions)
- 112th Sapper Battalion
- 112th Antitank Battalion

The division's formation was entrusted to Colonel Andrei Getman, the former chief of staff of the 30th Mechanised Corps. Deputy Colonel Andrei Getman appointed Plato Y. Mikhailov, a division of profits experienced commanders: The division commissioner became regimental commissar Yefim V. Beznosov, to the post of chief of staff appointed Colonel Mikhail Leonov Trofymovych.

By mid-October 1941, the 112th Tank Division was ready to be sent to the front. On the morning of 4 November 1941, the train carrying the divisional headquarters was attacked by German aircraft between Ryazan and Moscow. Four soldiers were wounded and two were killed. On 7 November, the division was unloaded at Podolsk.

The 112th Division became part of the 6th Tank Corps of the 1st Tank Army. Western Front headquarters created a mobile mechanized cavalry group, composed of General Belov's cavalry corps and the 112th Tank Division, under the overall command of General Alexander Belov. The group was created to prevent the German capture of Tula.

=== The fighting near Moscow ===
The 112th Tank Division saw its first combat on 16 November 1941 during the Battle of Moscow. Together with other units, the division was involved in an offensive in the direction of Maleev, Vyazovka and Vysokinichi. Amid strong resistance, however, it failed to achieve substantial results. The division was also involved in combat to the west and north-west of Serpukhov soon afterwards. As a result of the action, an attack by the German XIII Corps on Serpukhov was successfully repelled. After these battles, Colonel Getman's division was urgently transferred to Kashira, where the hospitals and the front of rear services, to eliminate the German breakthrough.

Until the beginning of the counter-offensive, 112th Tank Division served as a fire brigade, conducting counter-attacks on the flanks of groups of the enemy, supporting 49th and 50th Armies' thin line of defense. From December 7 to December 10 the division was united with the 340th Rifle Division under a single command. For its performance in military operations, 112th Tank Division received the Order of the Red Banner. On 2 January 1942 the division was reorganised as the 112th Tank Brigade, maintaining its numbers and numbers of regiments, which became battalions.

== Revolutionary Mongolia (1943) ==
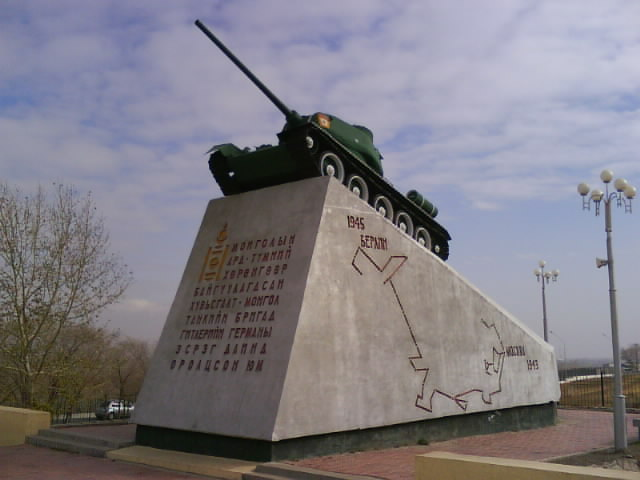
The Zaisan Memorial, created in 2003

The unit received the "Revolutionary Mongolia" title in 1943 when it was re-equipped with 34 T-34/76 and 21 T-70 tanks, funded by Gonchigiin Bumtsend. The Mongolian tanks were presented on 17 January 1943. In addition the Mongolian delegation, headed by Marshal Khorloogiin Choibalsan, supplied 237 railway wagons filled with free clothes and food: 1,000 tons of meat, 90 tons of oil, 80 tons of sausages, 150 tons of confectionery, 30,000 coats, 30,000 pairs of boots, and 30,000 fur padded jackets. One tank was presented by Marshal Choibalsan personally. The success of the unit was later followed by the creation of the Mongolian Arat squadron in the Soviet Air Force. Its commander, I. I. Gusakovii, was a double Hero of the Soviet Union. The brigade initially formed part of the 6th Tank Corps (I Formation). Subsequently, with the title "Revolutionary Mongolia" in the brigade received T-34 tanks of more advanced types.

In 1964, the unit was awarded the Order of Damdin Sükhbaatar by the Mongolian government. The Zaisan Memorial, featuring a surviving T-34 tank, was erected in 2003 to commemorate the role of the brigade.

It later became the 44th Guards Tank Brigade, then after the war the 44th Guards Tank Regiment. In 1993, it became the 44th Guards Tank Training Regiment, part of the 467th Guards District Training Centre.
