= Mongolian Arat squadron =

Soviet fighter squadron of World War II funded by Mongolia

Mongolian Arat Air Squadron
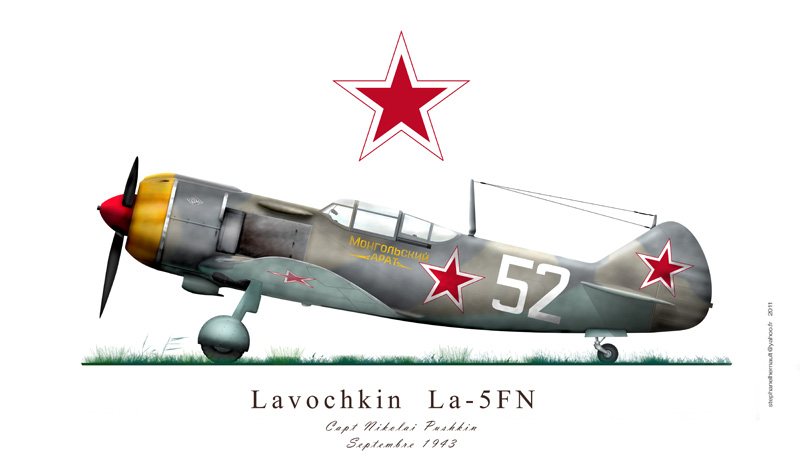
- A Lavochkin La-5F in the markings of the squadron, with the «Монгольский арат» nose art of the squadron.
- Active: 1925-1945
- Disbanded: 1945
- Country: Soviet Union
- Branch: Soviet Air Forces

The Mongolian Arat squadron (Russian: эскадрилья «Монгольский арат», romanized: Eskadrilya «Mongolski arat», lit. 'Mongolian Herdsman Air Squadron') was a fighter squadron in the Soviet Air Force, funded by contributions from the Mongolian People's Republic, that was operational during World War II. The Mongolian word "ard" (ард) means "people", but was malapropriated in Russian and other languages as "Arat" (арат) to mean a nomadic pastoralist or herdsman.

In March 1943, following the presentation of the "Revolutionary Mongolia" tank brigade to the Red Army, the Little Khural (parliament) of Mongolia, under Gonchigiin Bumtsend, announced its intention to fund a fighter squadron within the Soviet Air Force. The squadron was given 12 Lavochkin La-5 fighters in a formal ceremony and formed part of the 2nd Guards Fighter Aviation Regiment. Despite its name, the pilots and personnel of the unit were Russian rather than Mongolian.

The Squadron's commander, Aleksandr Ivanovich Maiorov, was awarded the Hero of the Soviet Union medal.

== Bibliography ==
- Sanders, Alan J. K. (2010). Historical Dictionary of Mongolia (3rd ed.). Plymouth: Scarecrow Press.
