= Vyazovka =

Vyazovka Вязовка
- Village
- Location within Bashkortostan Location within Russia
- Coordinates: 53°50′N 55°52′E
- Country: Russia
- Region: Bashkortostan
- District: Aurgazinsky District
- Time zone: UTC+5:00

Vyazovka (Russian: Вязовка) is a rural locality (a village) in Meselinsky Selsoviet, Aurgazinsky District, Bashkortostan, Russia. The population was 34 as of 2010. The village has one street.

== Geography ==
Vyazovka is located 33 km south of Tolbazy (the district's administrative centre) by road. Bolshoye Aksakovo is the nearest rural locality.
